= Kuala Lumpur Middle Ring Road 2 =

Road in Malaysia

Federal Route 28
- Kuala Lumpur Middle Ring Road 2 (MRR2)
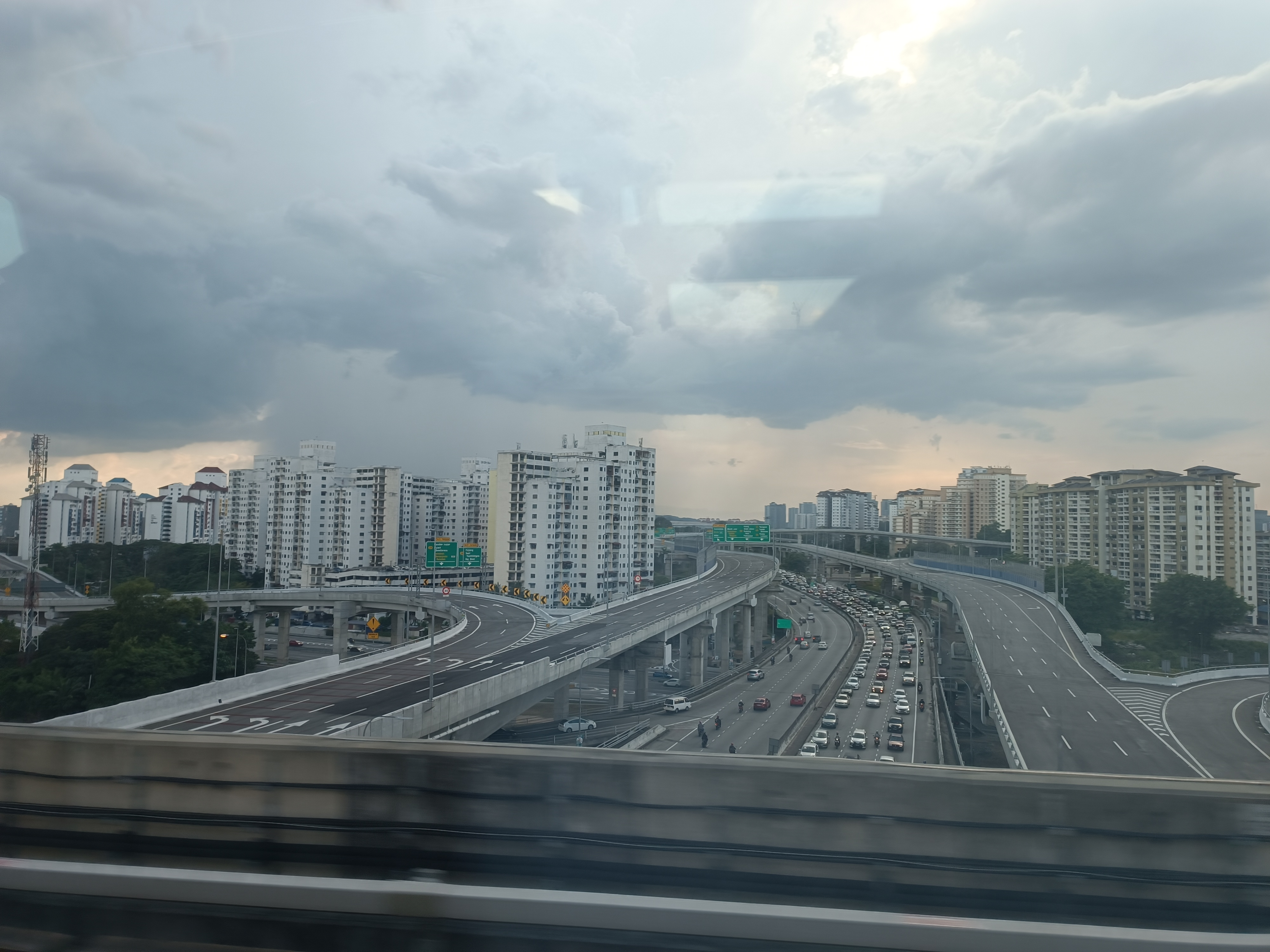

Route information
- Part of AH141 (Greenwood–Gombak North Interchange)
- Maintained by Malaysian Public Works Department
- Length: 65.0 km (40.4 mi)
- Existed: 1992–present
- History: Completed in 2002

Major junctions
- Beltway around Kuala Lumpur
- Northwest end: Bandar Sri Damansara
- FT 54 Sungai Buloh Highway; Damansara–Puchong Expressway; FT 54 Federal Route 54; B21 Kepong–Selayang Highway; FT 1 Kuala Lumpur–Rawang Highway; B22 Jalan Batu Caves; B125 Jalan Pinggiran Batu Caves Duta–Ulu Klang Expressway / FT 2 / AH141 Kuala Lumpur–Karak Expressway / FT 2 / AH141; Setiawangsa–Pantai Expressway; Sungai Besi–Ulu Klang Elevated Expressway; Ampang–Kuala Lumpur Elevated Highway; B36 Jalan Kerja Ayer Lama; B31 Jalan Ampang; Sungai Besi Expressway; FT 1 Cheras Highway; Kuala Lumpur–Seremban Expressway; Jalan Sungai Besi; Shah Alam Expressway
- Southeast end: Sri Petaling

Location
- Country: Malaysia
- Primary destinations: Kepong, Batu Caves, Gombak, Klang Gates, Taman Melawati, Ulu Klang, Ampang, Pandan Indah, Cheras, Bandar Tun Razak, Bandar Tasik Selatan, Sungai Besi

Highway system
- Highways in Malaysia; Expressways; Federal; State

Kuala Lumpur Middle Ring Road 2 (MRR2 or Kuala Lumpur Middle Ring Road 2 Scheme), Federal Route 28, is a ring road built by the Malaysian Public Works Department (JKR) to connect neighborhoods near the boundary of Federal Territory of Kuala Lumpur and Selangor. Altogether, the 65.0 km (40.4 mi) of the entire system consists of Federal Route 28, E11 Damansara–Puchong Expressway (from Sri Damansara Interchange to Sunway Interchange) and E5 Shah Alam Expressway (from Sunway Interchange to Sri Petaling Interchange). However, the Kuala Lumpur Middle Ring Road 2 is generally referred to as Route 28 since Route 28 occupies about two-thirds of the system.

== Route background ==
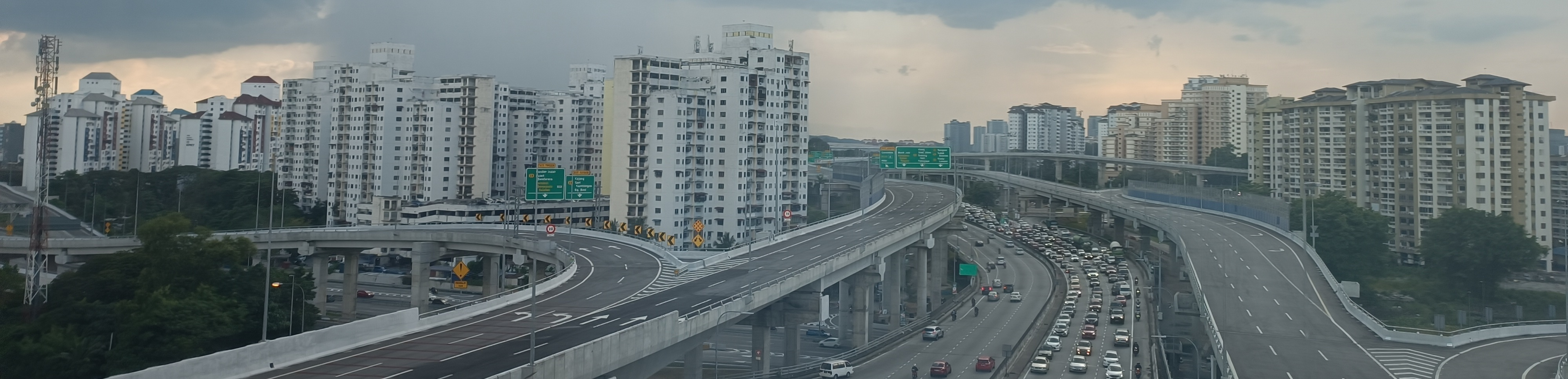
MRR2 Sri Petaling interchange with Sungai Besi Expressway, KESAS and Kuala Lumpur–Seremban Expressway including SUKE elevated on top.

The zeroth kilometre of the Kuala Lumpur Middle Ring Road 2 is located at Sri Damansara Interchange. At the first kilometre, it is connected to the Federal Route 54, Damansara–Puchong Expressway and DUKE Extension Expressway (SDL). The Kepong Flyover diverts the MRR2 from the Federal Route 54.

At Gombak, the MRR2 overlaps again with the Federal Route 2 from Greenwood Interchange to Gombak North Interchange.

The Kuala Lumpur Middle Ring Road 2, Federal Route 28, ends at Sri Petaling Interchange, where it proceeds as the Shah Alam Expressway.

== History ==
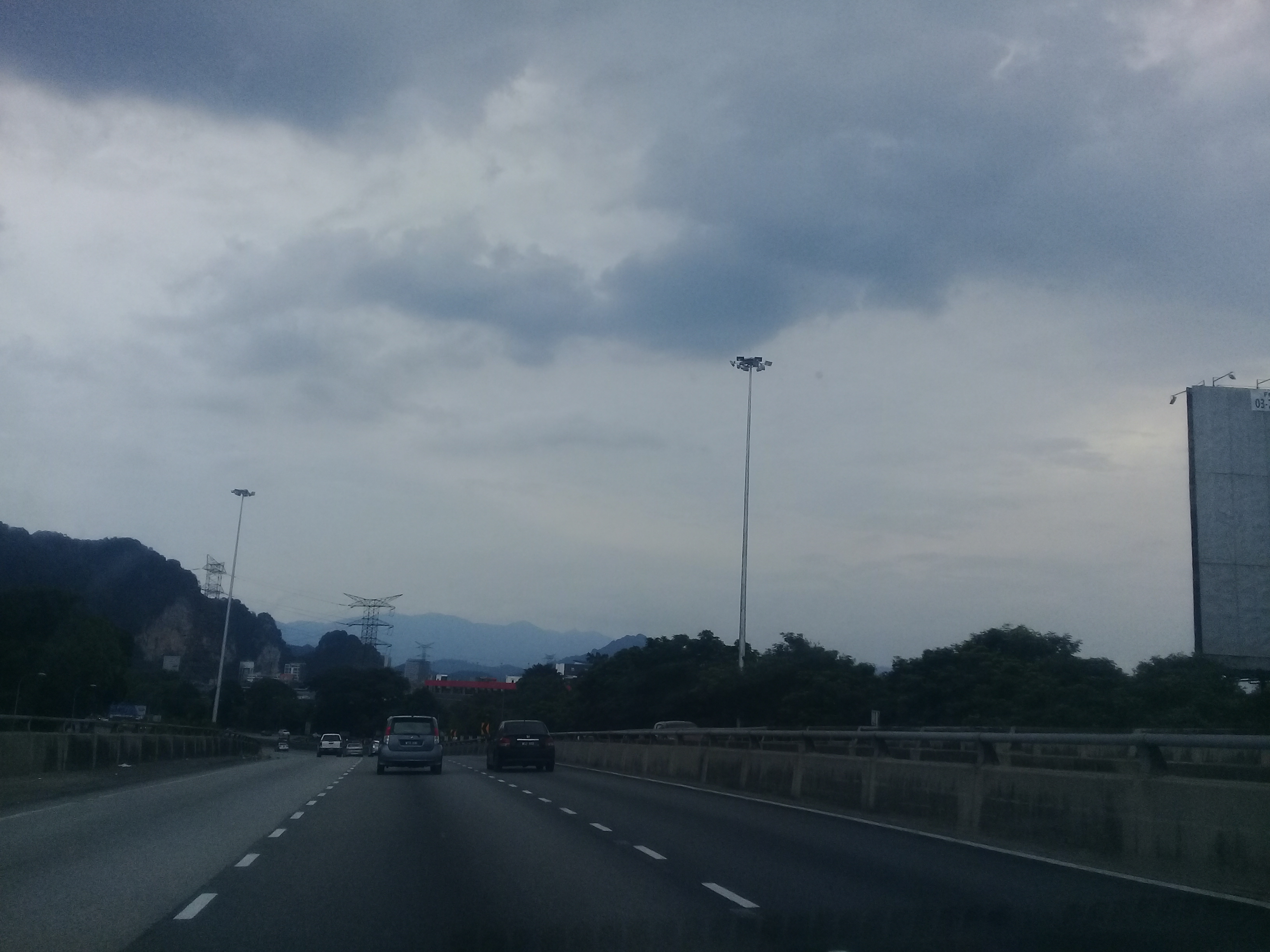
MRR2 going through Batu Caves

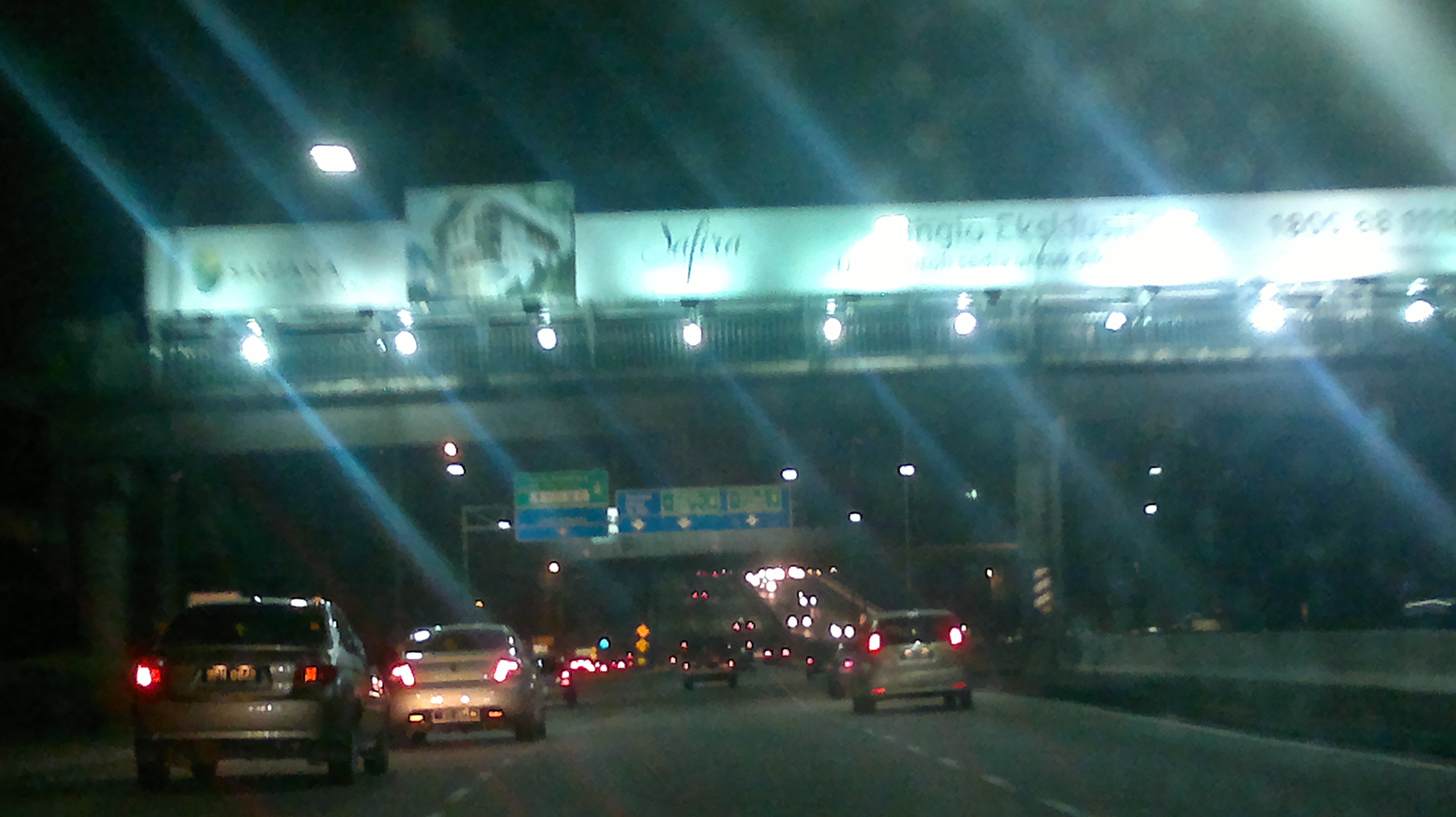
Through to Ampang Interchange in 2012 before Sungai Besi–Ulu Klang Elevated Expressway construction

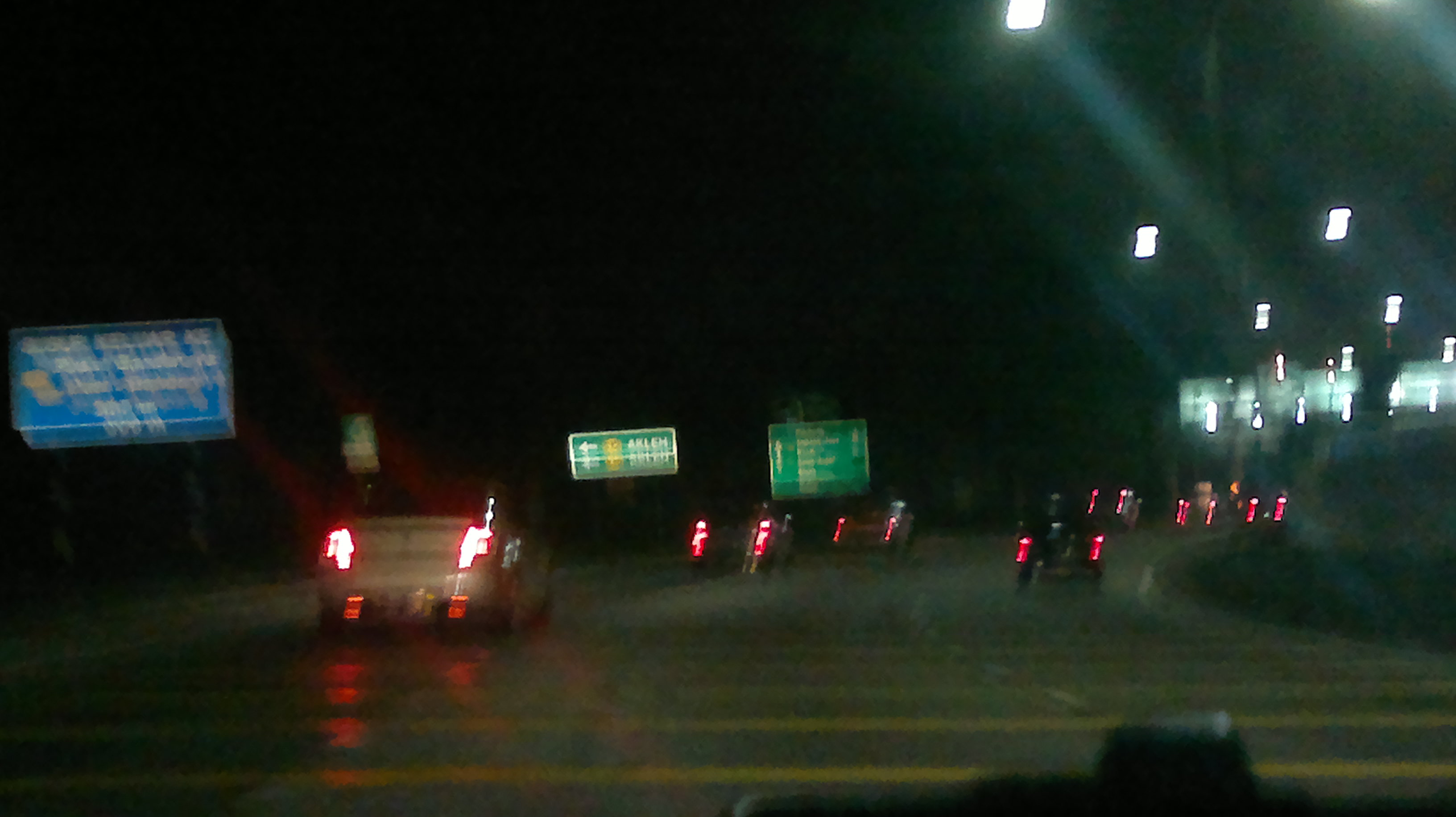
MRR2 at night before SUKE constructed

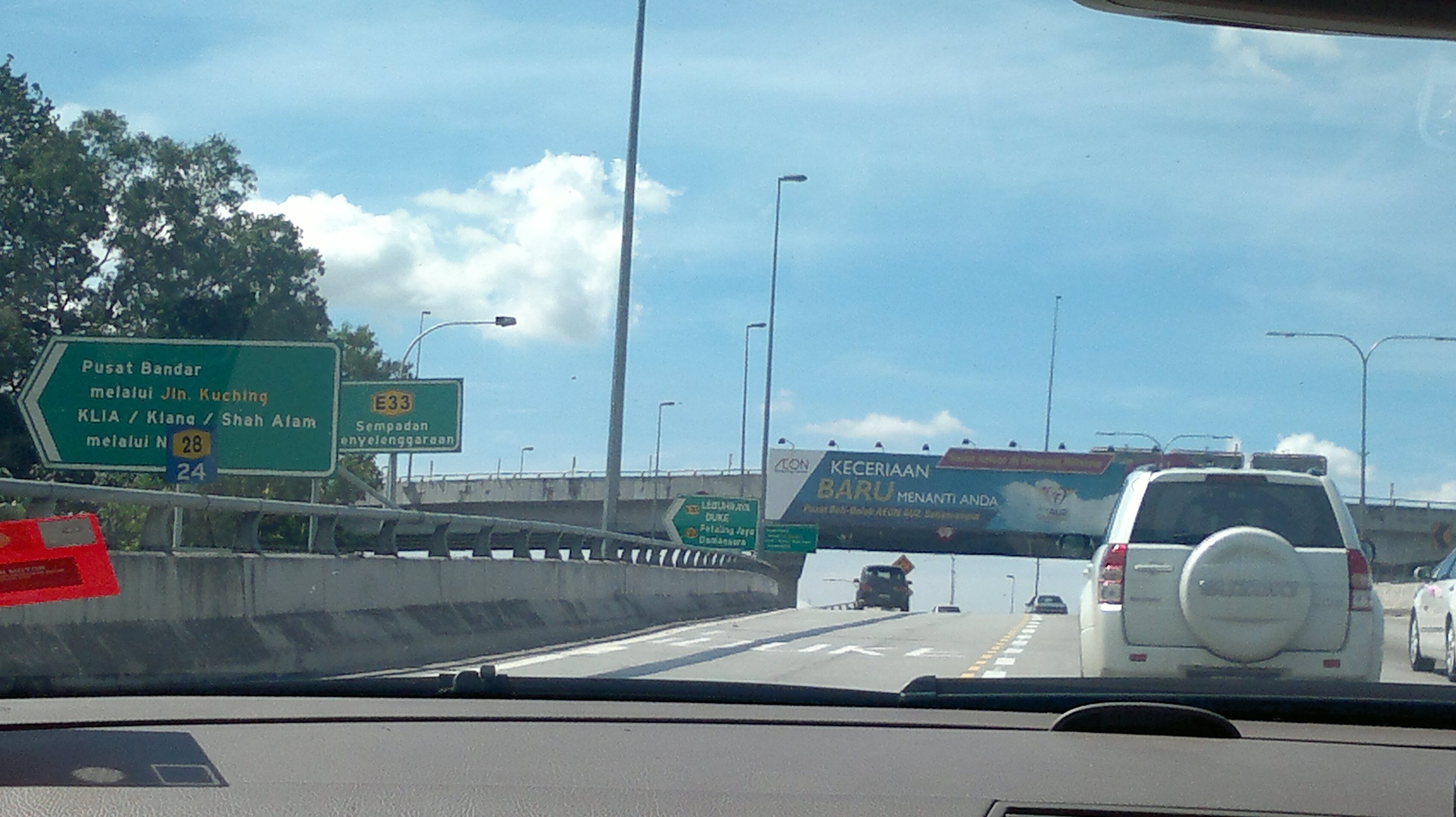
Through to DUKE-Hillview Interchange

Construction of this ring road was divided into three phases. These phases were Bandar Sri Damansara–Kepong–Batu Caves–Gombak, Gombak–Ulu Klang–Ampang and Ampang–Pandan–Cheras–Sri Petaling. It was divided into 12 packages costing RM880 million. This project was built by the JKR and the Bumi Hiway Sdn Bhd as the main contractor.

=== Pioneer routes ===
The construction of the MRR2 included the acquisition and upgrades of several major roads as follows:

Highway shield	Roads	Sections
FT 54	Jalan Sungai Buloh	Sri Damansara–Kepong
B21	Kepong–Selayang Highway	Kepong–Taman Daya
B22	Jalan Batu Caves	Batu Caves–Greenwood
FT 2	Kuala Lumpur–Karak Highway	Greenwood–Gombak North
	Jalan Taman Melati	Taman Melati–Taman Melawati
B23	Jalan Ulu Klang	Taman Melawati–Ampang
	Jalan Pandan Utama	Pandan Jaya–Pandan Indah
	Jalan Cheras Baru	Jalan Kuari–Cheras Roundabout
	Jalan Midah Utama	Cheras Roundabout–Taman Midah
	Jalan Bandar Tasik Selatan	Persiaran Mewah–Bandar Tasik Selatan

== Developments ==
=== Upgrade to LED streetlights ===
The Kuala Lumpur Middle Ring Road 2 FT28 is one of the three federal highways being included under the pioneer LED street lights installation program on federal highways; the other two highways are the Subang Airport Highway FT15 and the Federal Highway FT2, covering the total distance of 63.1 km. The pioneer LED street lights installation program was a collaboration between the Ministry of Works and Ministry of Finance, as well as the Public Works Department as the implementing agency and Philips Malaysia as the contractor. The LED street lights replacement works began in June 2011 and was scheduled to be completed in March 2012.

According to the former Works Minister, Datuk Seri Shaziman Abu Mansor, the LED street lights could provide up to 50% savings on the electricity bills of those three federal highways. As of June 2011, the federal government paid RM26 million of the electricity bills for the conventional street lights nationwide every year. However, most streetlights on the road are broken and unlikely to be replaced.

== Features ==
- Half circular ring road
- Six-lane dual carriageway
- Many flyovers along ring roads including Kepong Flyover, Batu Caves Flyover, Melawati Flyover, Ampang Flyover, Pandan Flyover, Cheras Flyover and Bandar Tun Razak Flyover.
- Kilometre and hectometre markers. It can be used for reporting accidents location. Some of them are not replaced when construction happens on the road.
- Landmarks along MRR2 such as Batu Caves temple
- The Kepong Metropolitan Park is located along MRR2 near Kepong.

== Controversial issues ==
=== Squatter area at the MRR2 construction site ===
During the construction of the MRR2. The highway was constructed at the squatter area between Ampang, Pandan Jaya, Pandan Indah and Cheras in the 1990s.

=== Lemang stalls at MRR2 ===
During the annual festival months and beyond, hawkers will set up 'lemang' stalls opposite Zoo Negara which causes dangerous traffic bottlenecks that can stretch 3 kilometers long during peak hours The Ampang Jaya Municipal Council (MPAJ) need to curb these safety hazards by relocating it elsewhere thus not affecting the traffic flow.

=== Beam cracks on the Kepong Flyover ===
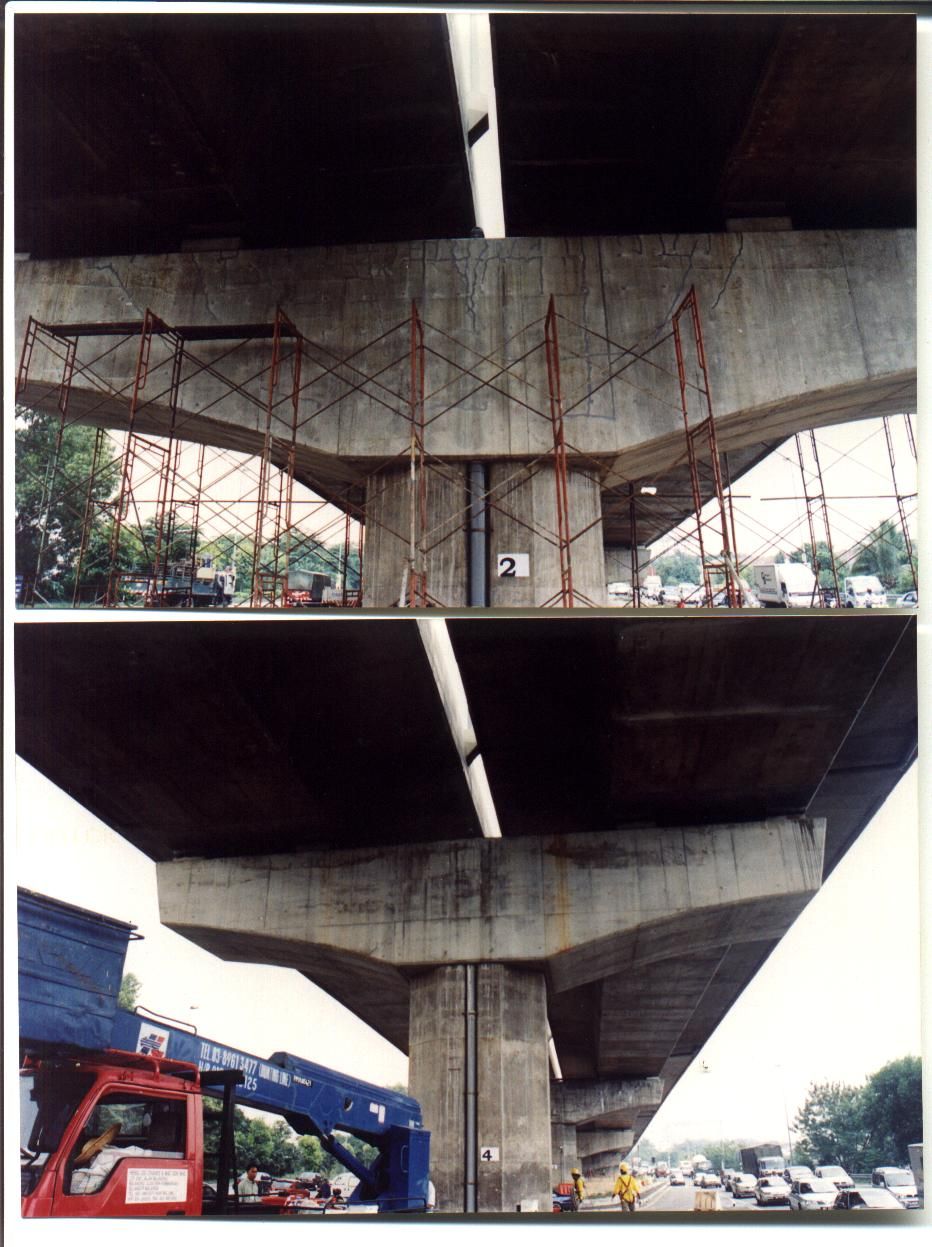
Notice that there are some strange grouted vertical cracks.

==== First closure ====
Residents of the neighborhood of Kepong expressed their fear about the safety on the Kepong Flyover which was reported to be faulty as 31 of 33 pillars supporting the flyover were reported to have obvious cracks. At some pillars and tiers, there were more than 7000 cracks detected. Public concern about the safety issues at Kepong Flyover was due to the risks faced by at least 4,300 motorists using the flyover at a time. Investigations were carried out by four different parties, namely Maunsell, Sharma & Zakaria (the designer), Köhler & Seitz Engineering Services (appointed by the contractor), Halcrow Consultants Ltd. (appointed by JKR) and Leondhardt Andrä und Partner. Meanwhile, the Kepong Flyover was closed to traffic and then reopened with only 4 out of 6 lanes. On August 10, 2004, the Works Minister, Dato' Seri S Samy Vellu, reminded the public that the cracks were not due to design flaw and "nobody can simply open their mouth and suggest it is design flaw" (Bernama 10 August 2004). However, findings from Halcrow Consultants Ltd. suggested the design did not comply with the requirement of BS5400, the improper anchoring of the column rebar to the crossbeams and the formation of ettringite (delayed ettringite formation) were responsible for the cracks and were finally accepted by the ministry.

==== Second closure ====
On 4 February 2006, the Kepong Flyover was closed to traffic from 10:30 am after serious damages on the flyover were confirmed.

Many complaints arrived about the damages on MRR2. Traffic jams also have risen due to the incompletion of the MRR2 (see right).

On 8 December 2006, the Kepong Flyover was reopened to all traffic.

==== Third closure ====
On 3 August 2008, Kepong flyover was closed to all traffic after three of the eighteen carbon fibre panels on pillar 28 had peeled off. Pillar 28 is where the German consultant Leonhardt Andrä und Partner did the repair works as a sample for Malaysian contractor to follow. This is the third time the 1.7-km MRR2 Kepong flyover has been closed because of cracks.

== Junction lists ==
The junction lists is following clockwise from Bandar Sri Damansara to Sri Petaling.

Legend:

- I/C - Interchange, I/S - Intersection, RSA - Rest and service area, OBR - Overhead bridge restaurant, R/R - Restaurant and rest plaza, L/B - Layby, V/P - Vista point, TN - tunnel, T/P - Toll plaza, BR - Bridge
- C - Cloverleaf, S - Stack, T-A - Trumpet-A, T-B - Trumpet-B, DT - Directional-T/Y, SDT - Semi-Directional-T/Y, P-Y - Partial-Y, D - Diamond, P-C - Partial cloverleaf, D-D - Diverging diamond, D-R - Direct ramp

State	District	Km	Exit	Section	Name	Destinations	Notes
Through to FT 54 Sungai Buloh Highway
Selangor	Petaling	0.0	1	Concurrent with FT 54	Sri Damansara I/C	Persiaran Utama – Bandar Sri Damansara, Kepong Industrial Area; Damansara–Puchong Expressway – Desa Park City, Damansara, Petaling Jaya, Puchong, Putrajaya, Cyberjaya, Kuala Lumpur International Airport (KLIA)	Multi-level stacked half-SPUI interchange with on-ramp from LDP
Selangor	Petaling		2A	Concurrent with FT 54	Menjalara I/C	Jalan Taman Bukit Maluri – Taman Bukit Maluri, Bandar Menjalara, Desa Park City	Diamond interchange
Selangor	Petaling		2B	Concurrent with FT 54	DUKE (Sri Damansara Link) I/C	Duta–Ulu Klang Expressway (Sri Damansara Link) – KLCC, City Centre, Ampang, Ulu Klang, Gombak, Jalan Kuching, Segambut	Elevated directional ramp interchange with u-turn from DUKE
Selangor	Gombak		BR	Kepong Flyover	Railway crossing bridge on the flyover		
Selangor	Gombak		3	Kepong Flyover	Kepong; Kepong I/C	Below flyover – Kepong Sentral station, Taman Daya; Diamond I/C; FT 54 Jalan Kepong – Kepong, Jinjang, Kuala Lumpur; Jalan Kepong Garden – Taman Kepong Garden	Diamond interchange on the below flyover only
Selangor	Gombak		4	Kepong Flyover	Taman Kepong Indah I/C	B21 Kepong–Selayang Highway – Bandar Baru Selayang, Selayang Hospital , Forest Research Institute Malaysia (FRIM)	Half diamond interchange
Kuala Lumpur				Land	Kepong Metropolitan Park	Kepong Metropolitan Park – V	Kite crossing From Batu Caves only
Kuala Lumpur			BR	Land	Jinjang River bridge		
Kuala Lumpur		6.8		Land	Kepong Landfill	Kepong Landfill, Kepong Waste Disposal Centre	Off ramp from Batu Caves only
Kuala Lumpur		8.4	5	Land	Batu Caves Roundabout I/C	FT 1 Kuala Lumpur–Rawang Highway – Ipoh, Rawang, Bandar Baru Selayang, Segambut, Sentul, Kuala Lumpur	Multi-level stacked roundabout interchange
Selangor	Gombak	9.0	BR	Land	Sungai Batu River bridge		
Selangor	Gombak	9.2	BR	Land	Railway crossing bridge		
Selangor	Gombak	9.7	6	Land	Batu Caves; Batu Caves I/C	B22 Jalan Batu Caves – Batu Caves town centre, Sungai Tua, Ulu Yam, Batu Caves temple, Batu Caves Komuter station Jalan Perusahaan – Batu Caves Industrial Area	Diamond interchange
Selangor	Gombak			Land	Batu Caves temple		
Selangor	Gombak			Batu Caves flyover	Batu Caves flyover	Taman Samudera, Taman Sri Gombak, Giant Hypermarket Batu Caves	Start/end of flyover
Selangor	Gombak	10.5	7	Batu Caves flyover	Taman Sri Batu Caves I/C	Jalan Sri Batu Caves – Taman Sri Batu Caves, Batu, Sentul Pasar, Sentul	Junctions on the below flyover only
Selangor	Gombak		8	Batu Caves flyover	Taman Samudera I/C	Taman Samudera	Junctions on the below flyover only
Selangor	Gombak	11.8	9	Land	Taman Sri Gombak I/C	B125 Jalan Pinggiran Batu Caves – Taman Bolton, Taman Sri Gombak, Pinggiran Batu Caves, Taman Gemilang, Kampung Melayu Wira Damai	Half-diamond interchange
Selangor	Gombak	12.1	10	Concurrent with FT 2 / AH141	Greenwood I/C	B22 Jalan Batu Caves – Gombak, Taman Greenwood Duta–Ulu Klang Expressway (Karak Link) / FT 2 / AH141 – Kuala Lumpur, Sentul	Multi-level stacked Diamond interchange
Selangor	Gombak	12.1	10A	Concurrent with FT 2 / AH141	Greenwood I/C	Duta–Ulu Klang Expressway (Karak Link) / FT 2 / AH141 – Kuala Lumpur, Sentul	Elevated U-turn to DUKE
Selangor	Gombak	12.6		Concurrent with FT 2 / AH141	Taman Seri Gombak	Taman Seri Gombak	Ampang bound
Selangor	Gombak	12.6		Concurrent with FT 2 / AH141	Taman Sahabat	Taman Sahab; Taman Desa Minang; Taman Berlian	Batu Caves bound
Selangor	Gombak	13.3		Concurrent with FT 2 / AH141	Sungai Gombak bridge		
Selangor	Gombak	13.8	L/B	Concurrent with FT 2 / AH141	Petronas and Shell L/B	Petronas and Shell L/B – Petronas Shell Burger King	Ampang bound
Selangor	Gombak	14.3	11A	Concurrent with FT 2 / AH141	Gombak North I/C	B38 Jalan Sungai Pusu – Kampung Sungai Pusu, Gombak, International Islamic University Malaysia (IIUM) Gombak	Off ramp from Gombak only
Selangor	Gombak	14.4	11	Concurrent with FT 2 / AH141	Gombak North I/C	Kuala Lumpur–Karak Expressway / FT 2 / AH141 – Genting Highlands, Bentong, Raub, Simpang Pelangai, Temerloh, Kuantan, Kuala Terengganu, Kota Bharu	Directional-T interchange
Selangor	Gombak		L/B	Land	Shell L/B	Shell L/B – Shell	Batu Caves bound
Selangor	Gombak	15.0	12B	Land	Terminal Bersepadu Gombak I/C	Terminal Bersepadu Gombak – 🚉 5 Gombak LRT Station (LRT Kelana Jaya Line depot/north end), 🚉East Coast Rail Link (ECRL) Gombak Station, Taman Melati, Taman Cemerlang	Directional interchange Batu Caves bound only to Terminal Bersepadu Gombak
Selangor–FT Kuala Lumpur border			BR	Land	Gombak viaduct		
Kuala Lumpur		16.2	12	Land	Taman Melati I/C	Jalan Taman Melati 1/5 – Taman Melati, Taman Ibukota; Persiaran Melati Kuarza – Taman Melati Kuarza, KL East Mall	Half diamond interchange
Kuala Lumpur				Land	Taman Melati	Jalan Taman Melati 1	LILO interchangeBatu Caves bound only
Kuala Lumpur		16.5	12A	Land	Taman Melati-SPE I/C	Setiawangsa–Pantai Expressway – Wangsa Maju, Setiawangsa, Kampung Pandan, Bandar Malaysia, Kerinchi, Petaling Jaya	Start/end of flyover entering/exiting expressway
Kuala Lumpur		17.9	13	Land	Klang Gates I/C	Jalan Kolam Air – Kampung Klang Gates, Klang Gates Recreational Park, International School of Kuala Lumpur (ISKL); FT 2 Genting Klang–Pahang Highway – Wangsa Maju, Setapak, Kuala Lumpur City Centre, Universiti Tunku Abdul Rahman (UTAR) Kuala Lumpur Campus; Setiawangsa–Pantai Expressway – Wangsa Maju, Setiawangsa, Kampung Pandan, Bandar Malaysia, Kerinchi	Diamond interchange with one ramp from FT 2 Genting Klang–Pahang Highway
Kuala Lumpur		19.0	14	Land	Wangsa Melawati I/C	Jalan 2/27A – Wangsa Melawati, Wangsa Maju	Half diamond interchange
Selangor	Gombak	20.0	15	Land	Taman Melawati I/C	Jalan Taman Melawati – Taman Melawati; Persiaran Permata – Taman Permata, Wangsa Maju, Lembah Keramat AU5, AU4	Diamond interchange
Selangor	Gombak		BR	Land	Sungai Klang bridge		
Selangor	Gombak			Land	FINAS	FINAS, Studio Merdeka, Kampung Fajar	From Taman Melawati only
Selangor	Gombak			Land	Jalan Taman Zooview; National Zoo of Malaysia (Zoo Negara)	Jalan Taman Zooview – National Zoo of Malaysia (Zoo Negara), Kampung Kemensah, Taman Zooview, Kemensah Heights, Institut Budaya Baru Melayu Selangor (IBBMS)	LILO Interchange; From Taman Melawati only
Selangor	Gombak			Land	Kampung Ulu Klang; Kampung Pasir	Jalan Haji Mokhtar – Lorong Penghulu	From Ampang only
Selangor	Gombak			Land	Sekolah Kebangsaan Ulu Klang		Towards Batu Caves only
Selangor	Gombak			Land	Masjid Jamek Ar-Ridhuan		Slip road under flyover towards Batu Caves only
Selangor	Gombak	22.0	16	Land	Ulu Klang I/C	Jalan AU4 – Lembah Keramat AU4, AU5, Wangsa Maju, Taman Permata; Jalan AU3/1 – Lembah Keramat AU3, AU2, Wangsa Maju; Jalan Ukay Perdana – Ukay Perdana, Bukit Antarabangsa; East Klang Valley Expressway – Ukay Perdana, Lembah Jaya, Hulu Langat, Bandar Mahkota Cheras, Kajang, Sungai Long	Diamond interchange
Selangor	Gombak		BR	Land	Sungai Sering bridge		
Selangor	Gombak			Land	Pinggiran Ukay	Jalan Beverly Heights 1	LILO interchange From under flyover slip road towards Ampang only
Selangor	Gombak			Land	Bukit Antarabangsa	Jalan Wangsa 1 – Bukit Antarabangsa	From Hulu Klang only
Selangor	Gombak	24.2	17A	Land	Taman Hillview I/C	Jalan Enggang – Jalan AU 3/1, Lembah Keramat AU2, AU1, Wangsa Maju, Taman Setiawangsa, Kampung Datuk Keramat; Jalan Hillview Utama – Taman Hillview	Roundabout interchange
Selangor	Gombak	24.2	17B	Land	DUKE Ulu Klang I/C	Duta–Ulu Klang Expressway (Main Link) – Sentul, Segambut, Jalan Duta, Setapak, Mont Kiara, Petaling Jaya	Stacked interchange (above flyover)
Selangor	Gombak	24.7	17C	Land	SUKE Ulu Klang	Sungai Besi–Ulu Klang Elevated Expressway – Ampang, Permai, Hulu Langat, Bukit Teratai, Cheras Hartamas, Cheras, Kajang, Alam Damai, Sungai Besi	Ramp entering/exiting expressway Ramp entering towards Ampang only
Selangor	Gombak–Hulu Langat district border		BR	Land	Sungai Ampang bridge		
Selangor	Hulu Langat	26.1	18A	Land	Ampang-AKLEH I/C	Ampang–Kuala Lumpur Elevated Highway – Kuala Lumpur, KLCC, Jalan Tun Razak, Jalan Sultan Ismail	From Ampang only
Selangor	Hulu Langat	26.3	18B	Ampang flyover	Jalan Kerja Ayer Lama I/C	B36 Jalan Kerja Ayer Lama – Taman Tun Razak, Ukay Heights, Kelab Darul Ehsan, International School of Kuala Lumpur (ISKL); Ampang–Kuala Lumpur Elevated Highway – Kuala Lumpur, KLCC, Jalan Tun Razak, Jalan Sultan Ismail	Junctions below flyover
Selangor	Hulu Langat	26.7	18C	Ampang flyover	Ampang I/C (Pekan Batu Ampat Ampang)	Below flyover – Ampang Town; B31 Jalan Ampang – Desa Pahlawan, Taman Tasik Ampang Hilir, Kuala Lumpur, KLCC, Pekan Ampang, 3 P&R Ampang LRT station, Lembah Jaya, Bandar Baru Ampang, Hulu Langat	Multi-level stacked interchange
Kuala Lumpur				Ampang flyover	Jalan Ampang Putra Exit	Jalan Ampang Putra – Taman Putra Sulaiman, Taman Ampang Utama, Taman Dagang	LILO interchange From Ampang only
Selangor	Hulu Langat		BR	Pandan Flyover	Desa Pandan viaduct		
Selangor	Hulu Langat	28.0	19A	Pandan Flyover	Desa Pandan	Jalan Kanan 1 – Desa Pandan, Kampung Pandan	Towards Batu Caves only
Selangor	Hulu Langat			Pandan Flyover	Dataran Pandan Prima	Lotus's Ampang, Dataran Pandan Prima, Taman Pandan Prima, Petronas L/B with Burger King	Towards Batu Caves only
Selangor	Hulu Langat	29.2	19B	Pandan Flyover	Taman Cempaka I/C	Sungai Besi Expressway – Pandan Indah, Pekan Ampang, Kuala Lumpur, Salak South, Sungai Besi, Putrajaya, Petaling Jaya; Jalan Pandan 1 – Pandan Jaya, Taman Maluri, Kampung Pandan, Jalan Tun Razak; Jalan Cempaka – Taman Cempaka, Taman Dagang	Directional interchange
Selangor	Hulu Langat		BR	Pandan Flyover	Railway crossing bridge		
Selangor	Hulu Langat	29.8	20A	Land	Pandan Indah I/C	Sungai Besi Expressway (Jalan Pandan Indah) – Pandan Indah, Ampang Hospital, 3 Pandan Indah LRT station	Directional diamond interchange
Selangor	Hulu Langat		20B	Land	Jalan Pandan Utama Exit	Jalan Pandan Utama – Pandan Indah, Hospital Ampang	From Ampang only
Selangor	Hulu Langat		BR	Land	Sungai Kerayong bridge		
Selangor	Hulu Langat			Land	Elevated U-Turn	U-Turn – Pandan Indah, Ampang, Batu Caves, Kuantan; Sungai Besi Expressway – Kuala Lumpur, Salak South, Sungai Besi, Putrajaya, Petaling Jaya	From Ampang only
Selangor	Hulu Langat		21	Land	Taman Kencana I/C	Jalan Bunga Raya – Taman Kencana, Taman Lembah Maju, Taman Mawar, Taman Seraya, Taman Putra, Taman Seri Raya, Taman Saga, Taman Bukit Teratai, Taman Mega Jaya, Hulu Langat	Half diamond interchange
Selangor	Hulu Langat			Land	Pandan Perdana	Jalan Perdana 6/2 – Pandan Perdana	From Cheras only
Kuala Lumpur			22	Land	Jalan Kuari I/C	Jalan Kuari – Cheras Christian Cemetery, Cheras DBKL Crematorium, Jalan Semerah Padi, 9 Taman Pertama MRT station, Kampung Cheras Baru, Taman Rakyat, Taman Cheras Utama, Ketumbar Hill, Bukit Pandan, Taman Muda, Taman Lembah Maju, Taman Mawar, Taman Seraya, Taman Putra, Taman Seri Raya, Taman Saga, Taman Bukit Teratai, Taman Mega Jaya, Cheras, Ampang, Hulu Langat	Roundabout interchange
Kuala Lumpur		33.5	23A	Cheras flyover	Taman Cheras I/C	Taman Cheras	Junctions below flyover
Kuala Lumpur		33.7	23	Cheras flyover	Billion Roundabout I/C	FT 1 Cheras Highway – Kuala Lumpur, Bandar Tun Razak, Lotus's Cheras, 9 Taman Midah MRT station, Taman Tasik Permaisuri, 9 Taman Mutiara MRT station, Ampang, Kajang, Seremban	Multi-level stacked roundabout interchange
Kuala Lumpur		35.7	24A	Bandar Tun Razak flyover	Taman Connaught Exit	Below flyover – Taman Connaught, Taman Taynton, Chinese cemetery East–West Link Expressway – Kajang, Cheras	Off ramp from Cheras only Start/end of flyover
Kuala Lumpur		36.0	BR	Bandar Tun Razak flyover	Bandar Tun Razak flyover		
Kuala Lumpur		37.0	24B	Bandar Tun Razak flyover	Bandar Tun Razak I/C	Bandar Tun Razak – Bandar Tun Razak Industrial Area; East–West Link Expressway – Salak South, Seputeh, Bangsar, Petaling Jaya; Cheras–Kajang Expressway / FT 1 – Kajang, Cheras, Taman Connaught	Half diamond Interchange; Start/end of flyover
Kuala Lumpur		37.1	25	Land	Bandar Tasik Selatan	Jalan Tasik Selatan 1 – Bandar Tasik Selatan, Kem Sungai Besi, National Defence University of Malaysia (UPNM)	From Ampang only
Kuala Lumpur		38.0	26	Land	Terminal Bersepadu Selatan I/C	Terminal Bersepadu Selatan – Arrival/Departure; P&R Bandar Tasik Selatan station – KTM ETS 1 7 4 U-Turn	Interchange; Elevated U-Turn
Kuala Lumpur		39.2	27	Land	Sungai Besi I/C	Jalan Sungai Besi – Sungai Besi town Sungai Besi Expressway – Kuchai Lama, Petaling Jaya, Pandan Indah. Seri Kembangan, Putrajaya, Mines Resort City, Kajang	Directional Interchange
Kuala Lumpur		39.7	516	Land	Sri Petaling I/C	Kuala Lumpur–Seremban Expressway – Kuala Lumpur, Petaling Jaya; North–South Expressway Southern Route – Bangi, Kuala Lumpur International Airport, Seremban, Malacca, Johor Bahru	Interchange
Through to Shah Alam Expressway

== See also ==
- Kuala Lumpur Inner Ring Road
- Kuala Lumpur Middle Ring Road 1
- North-South Expressway Central Link
- Jalan Tuanku Abdul Halim
