= Taman Saujana Rawang =

Township in Gombak District, Malaysia

Coordinates: 3.3420662°N 101.5085183°E

Saujana Rawang is a township in Gombak District, Selangor, Malaysia. It is a 345 acres (140 ha) self-contained township development by Glomac Berhad that was originally launched in 2006.

== Geography ==
Saujana Rawang's development are divided into smaller residential phases namely Zara, Botania, Camelia, Alcedo, Aquila, Amoda, Ardea, Egreta, Amana and Divya. New residential in progress Taman M Aruna. The township is accessible through two main entrances. One through Taman Desa Mas and the other that directly connects the township to the Jalan Rawang-Bestari Jaya (B27).

=== Connectivity ===
The township is located approximately 11 km from PLUS Rawang exit, 9 km from LATAR Kundang exit and 11 km from PLUS upcoming Sg. Serai exit. The PLUS and LATAR expressways also connects the township to the GUTHRIE CORRIDOR expressway linking it to Shah Alam. There are two nearby train stations which are the KTM Rawang station (10 km) and KTM Kuang station (17 km). Saujana Rawang is located 30 km away from Skypark Terminal, Sultan Abdul Aziz Shah Airport and 82 km away from Kuala Lumpur International Airport (KLIA).

== Places ==
=== Leisure ===
There are two main parks in Saujana Rawang each with its own lakes that is surrounded by jogging tracks. They are the Saujana Lake and Southern Lake. The township also has its own basketball and futsal courts situated at one of the park. There are two nearby equestrian centre which are the 3Q Equestrian Centre (12 km) and Ar Raudhah Equine Centre (17 km).

Saujana Rawang is also located approximately 15 km away from Taman Rimba Komanwel and Kanching Templer's Park Jungle Waterfall. Other interesting places around the area are Tasik Biru Kundang (12 km), Kuala Selangor (43 km), Genting Highlands (60 km), Sekinchan (68 km) Fraser's Hill (81 km), Cameron Highlands (182 km) and Pangkor Island (225 km).

There are also four golf and recreation clubs nearby which are the Tasik Puteri Golf & Country Club (11 km), Kundang Lakes Country Club (10 km), Templer Park Country Club (18 km) and Bukit Beruntung Golf & Country Club (27 km)

=== Commercial ===
There is a commercial centre built inside the township itself known as Saujana Square. The shop lots currently house F&B outlets, mini markets, convenient store, baking supply shop, laundries, pet store, auto workshops, tuition centres, hardware store and printing shop. Other prominent commercial areas would be AEON Anggun Rawang (5 km), Anggun City (5 km), The Maisons Rawang (4 km), NSK Supermarket (7 km), TESCO Rawang (13 km), Giant Rawang Mall (10 km) and Parkson Rawang (10 km)

=== Healthcare ===
Currently there are two main hospitals which are located nearby Saujana Rawang. They are KPJ Rawang Specialist (10 km) and Hospital Sungai Buloh (20 km). Coming soon in December 2022 Selgate Hospital. The Selgate Hospital is located near the Aeon Store in Rawang.
