= Taman Greenwood =

Township in Gombak, Selangor, Malaysia

Greenwood
- Township
- Taman Greenwood
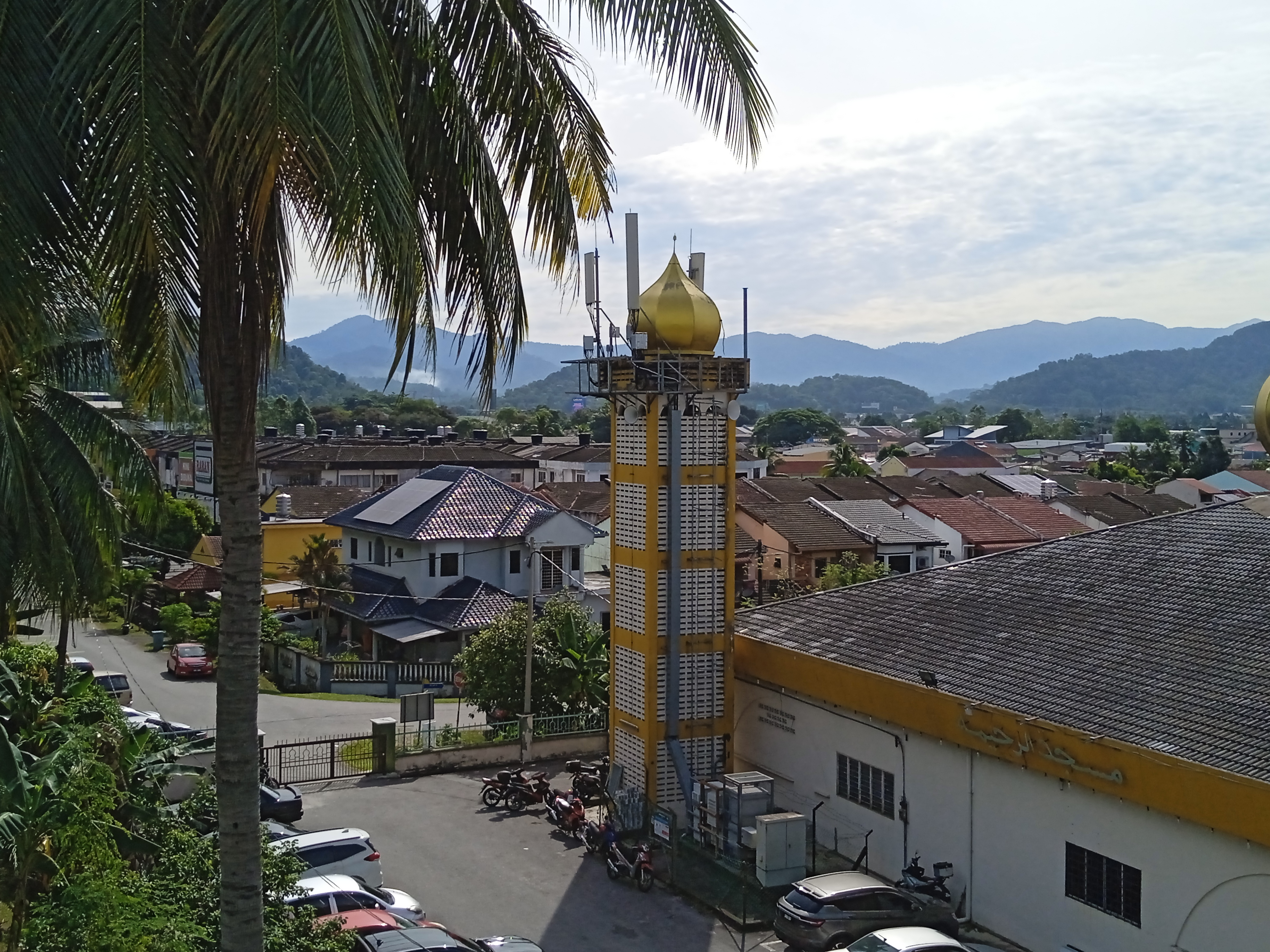
- Taman Greenwood skyline

- Greenwood in Selangor, Malay Peninsular and Malaysia Greenwood (Peninsular Malaysia) Greenwood (Malaysia)
- Coordinates: 3°14′1″N 101°42′15″E
- Country: Malaysia
- State: Selangor
- District: Gombak
- Time zone: UTC+8 (MYT)
- Postal code: 68100

Taman Greenwood is a neighborhood in Gombak District, Selangor, Malaysia.

== Location ==
It is located halfway between Batu Caves and Gombak town. Taman Greenwood is sandwiched between the MRR2's interchanges with Duta–Ulu Klang Expressway and East Coast Expressway, at Greenwood Interchange (Persimpangan Greenwood in Malay, or Interchange 3310).

== Public transportation ==
The nearest railway station from Taman Greenwood are Batu Caves station on Batu Caves–Pulau Sebang Line of KTM Komuter service and Gombak station on LRT Kelana Jaya Line.

The area is also accessible by Rapid KL bus route 170 (Hab Wira Damai–Sogo KL) along Duta–Ulu Klang Expressway, and 202 (Hab Wira Damai–BSN Lebuh Ampang) along Selangor State Route B22 (Jalan Batu Caves).

Rapid KL LRT feeder bus route T202 (LRT Taman Melati–Taman Melawar) serve as the first-last mile connectivity in neighbourhood of Taman Greenwood to Taman Melati LRT station of LRT Kelana Jaya line.

== Infrastructure ==
SMK Seri Gombak is a national secondary school (Sekolah Menengah Kebangsaan) in Taman Greenwood.

Masjid Ar-Rahimah is a mosque in Taman Greenwood, located at Jalan 14.

== Gallery ==
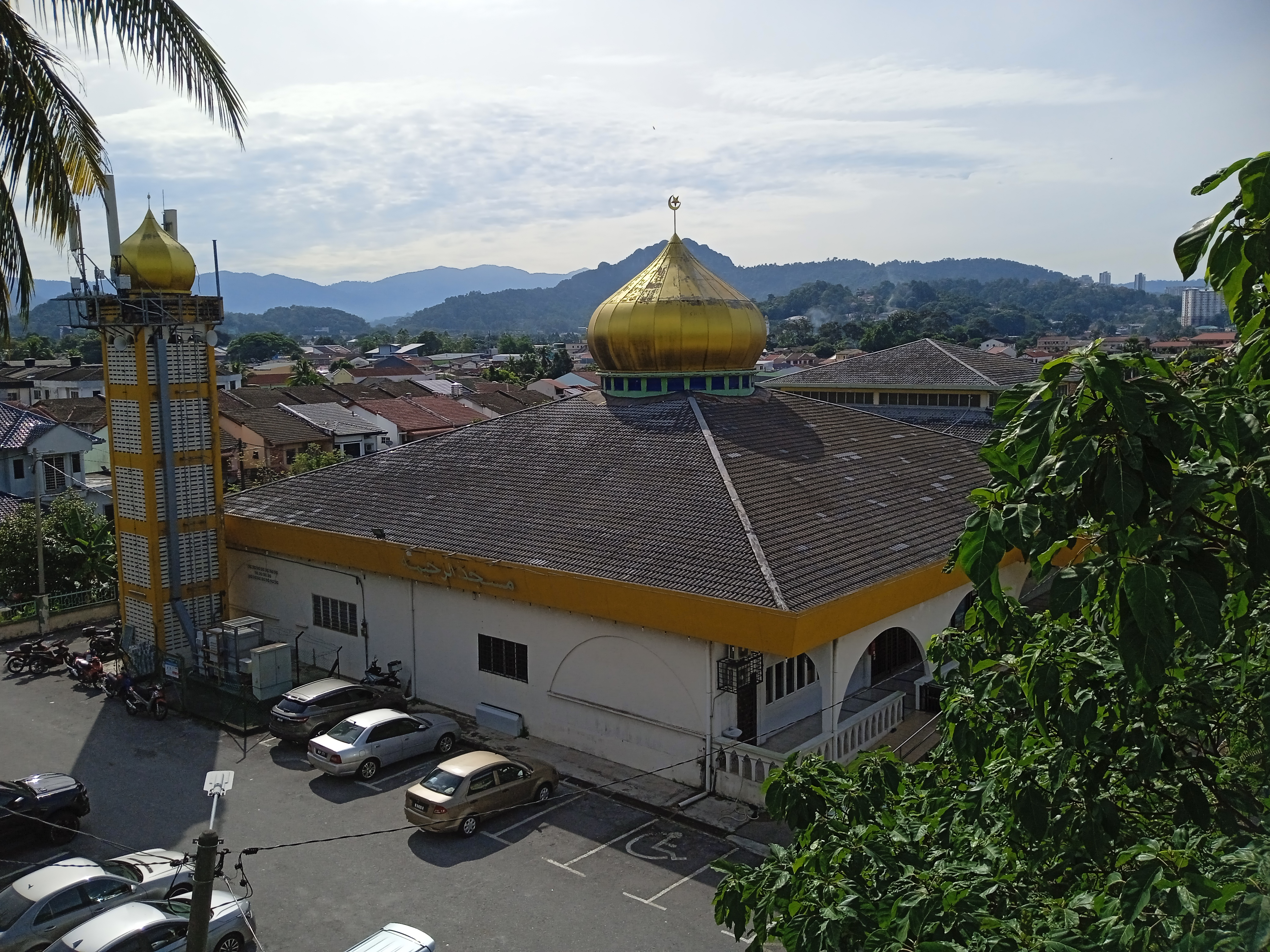
Masjid Ar-Rahimah building at Taman Greenwood

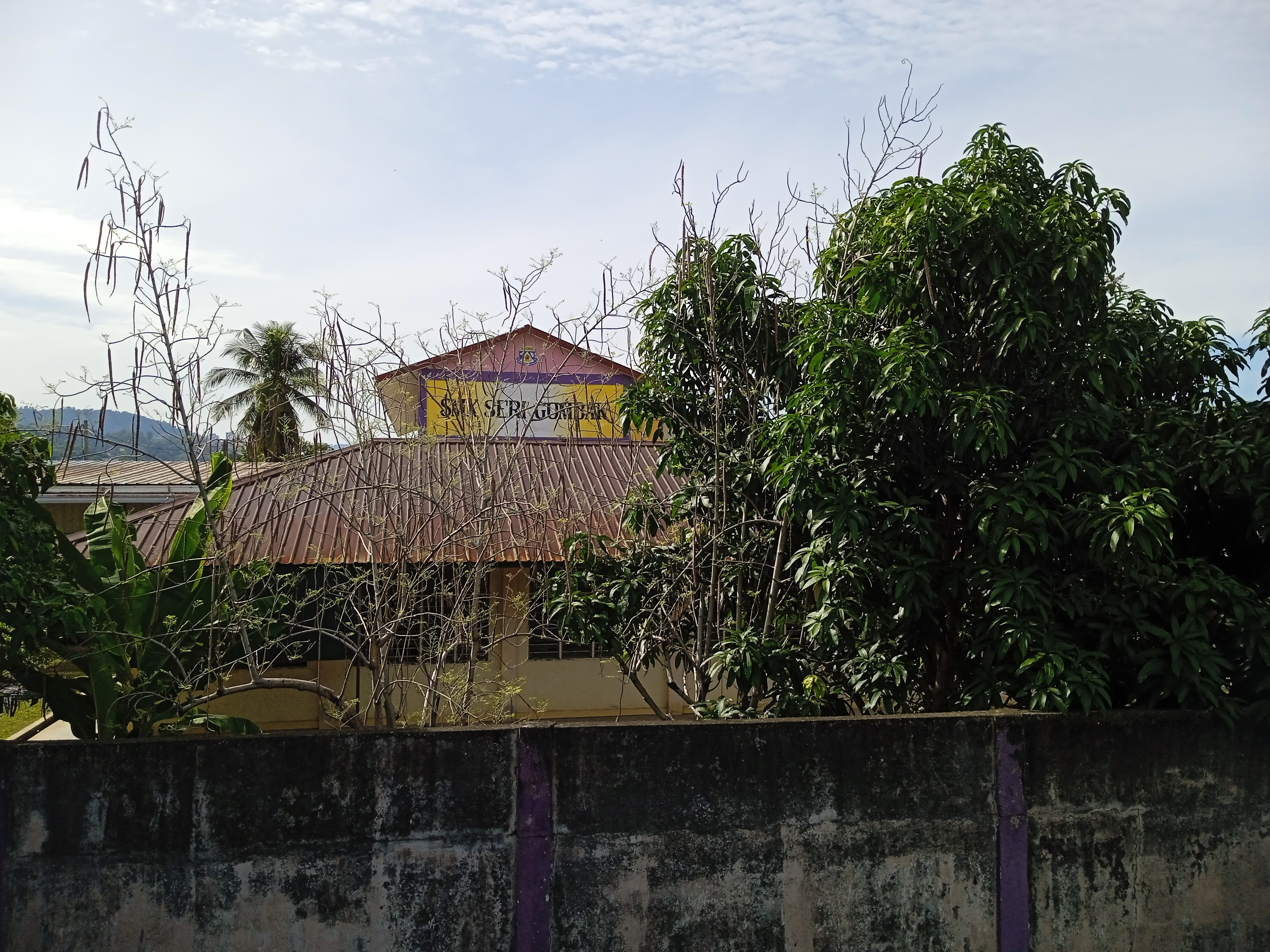
SMK Seri Gombak building from DUKE

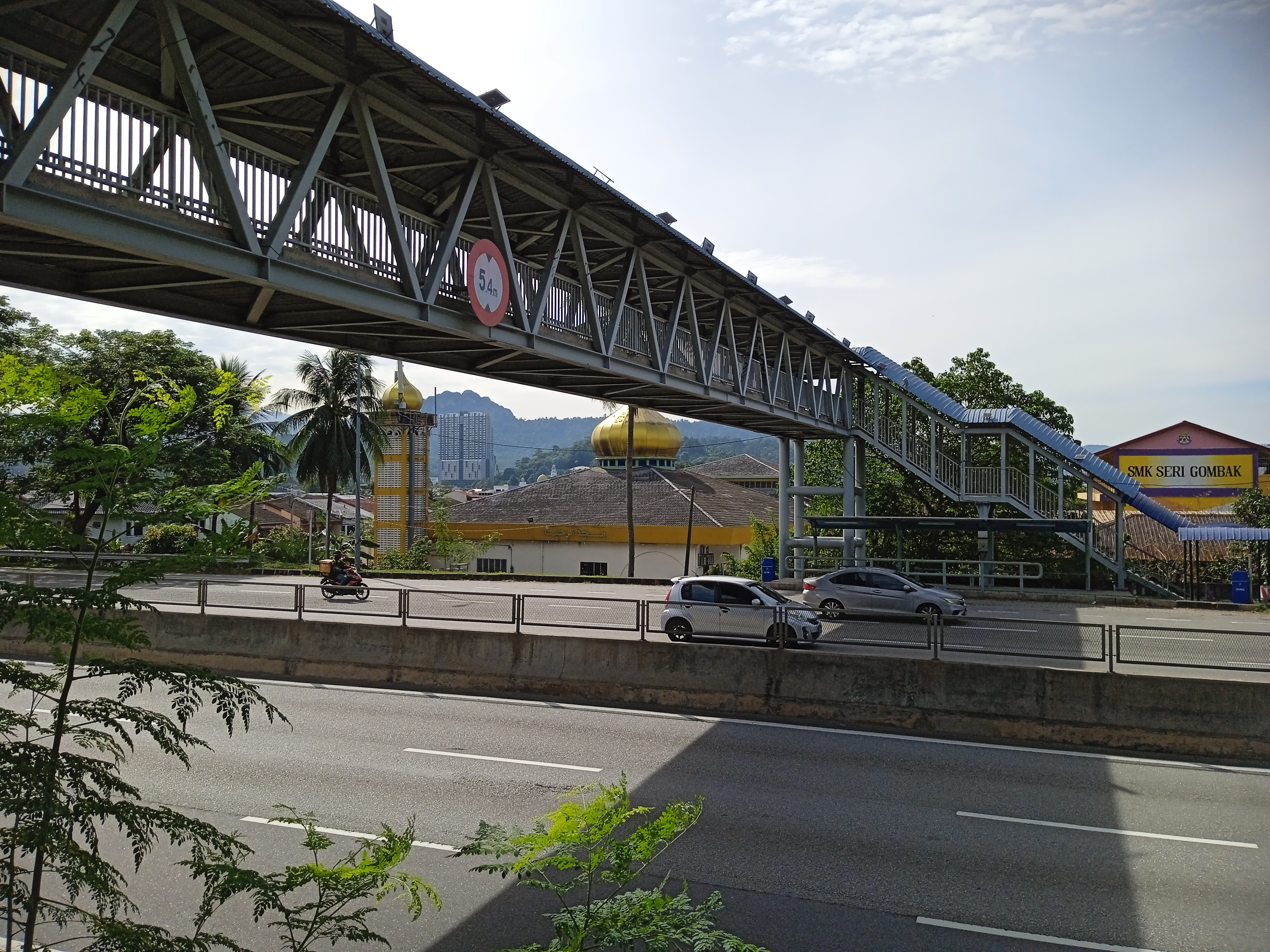
Taman Samudera—Taman Greenwood pedestrian bridge across over DUKE, looking towards Taman Greenwood from Taman Samudera

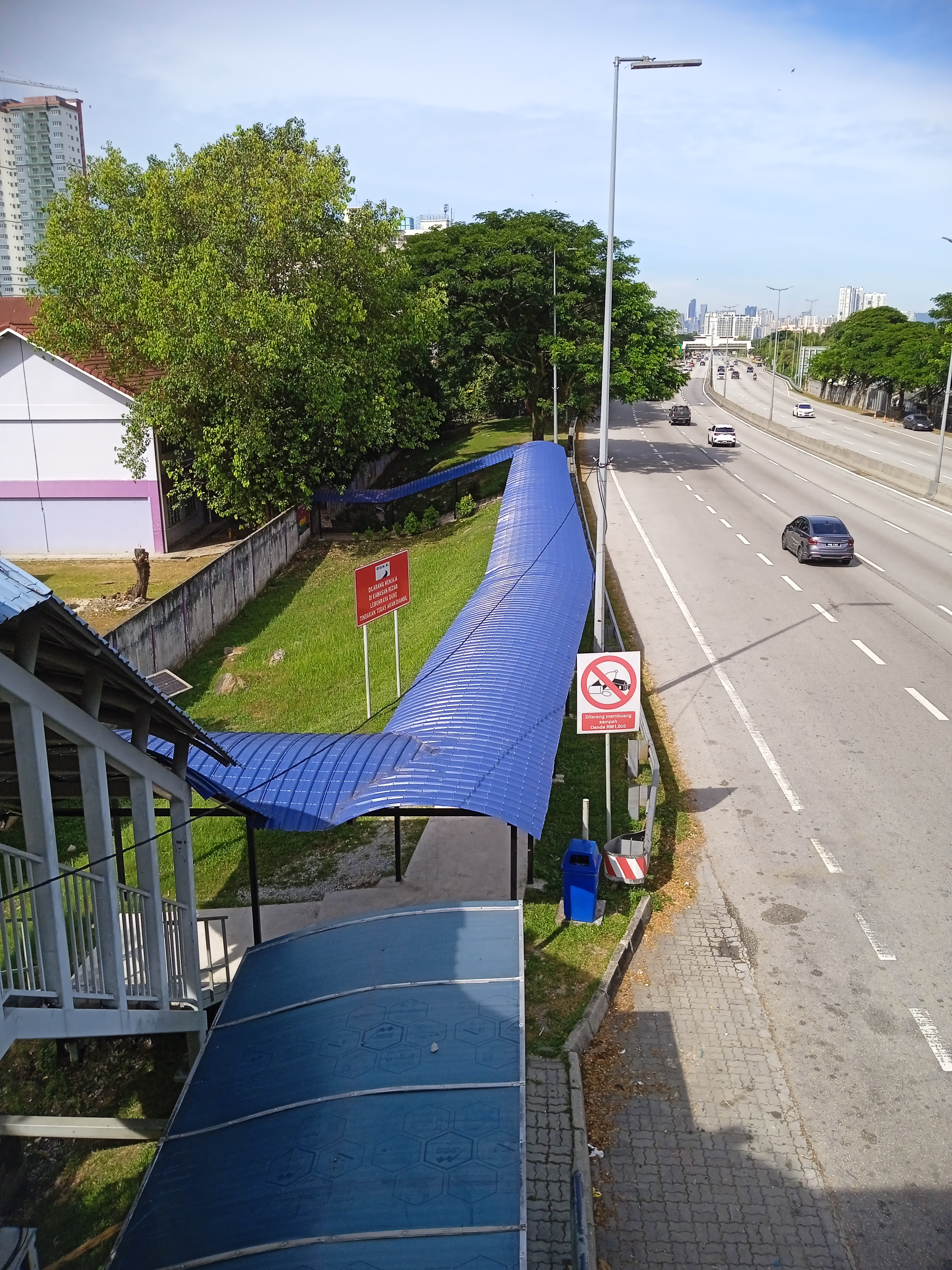
Masjid Ar-Rahimah stop (SL470) serve Taman Greenwood with Rapid KL bus route 170 from Hab Wira Damai to BSN Lebuh Ampang
