= Taman Bukit Maluri =

Coordinates: 3.201943°N 101.6321559°E

- Suburb
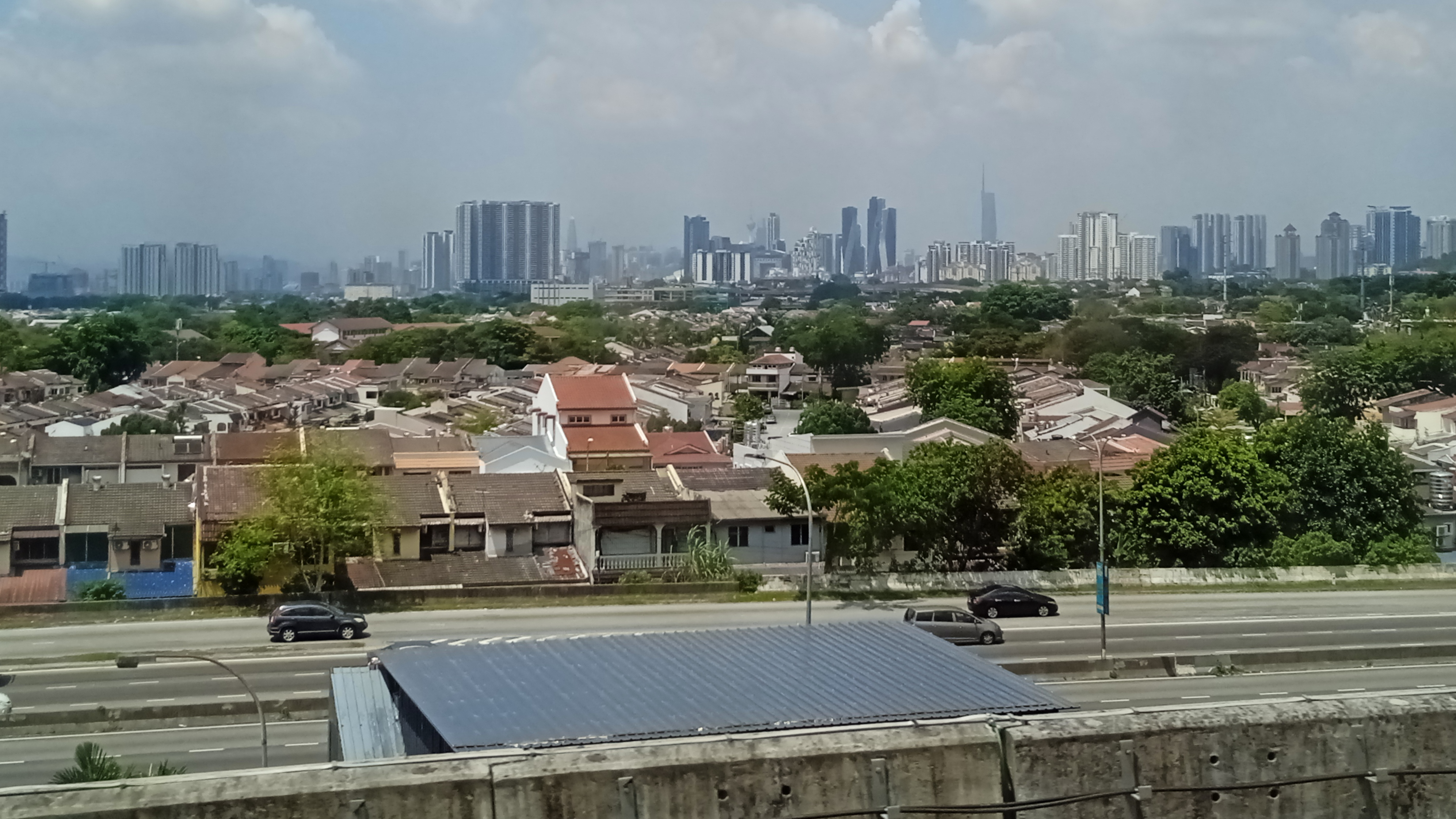
- Taman Bukit Maluri

- Location within Malaysia
- Country: Malaysia
- State: Federal Territory of Kuala Lumpur
- Constituency: Segambut

Government
  - Local Authority: Dewan Bandaraya Kuala Lumpur
  - Mayor: Kamarulzaman Mat Salleh
- Time zone: UTC+8 (MST)

Taman Bukit Maluri is a township in Segambut constituency, Kuala Lumpur, Malaysia. This township is located in Kepong adjacent to Menjalara to the south and Segambut to the east.

Taman Bukit Maluri is a matured estate within the developed township of Kepong. Located just off Kepong–Selayang Highway, this suburb is surrounded by neighboring communities like Menjalara and Kepong Baru, all interconnected. Taman Bukit Maluri was developed by Tun Daim bin Zainuddin and his company, Maluri Syarikat Sdn Bhd in the year 1971. Since then, it has transformed from a small-scale rubber plantation into a flourishing housing estate.

Taman Bukit Maluri consists of a mixed development, from residential to commercial and industrial properties. There has been much development in recent years, including the upgrading and addition of major highways connecting in and out of Kepong. The Damansara–Puchong Expressway (LDP), Jalan Kuching, MRR2 and Jalan Ipoh are amongst the main roads that connect through Kepong and via Jalan Taman Bukit Maluri into the neighborhood. The Kuala Lumpur city centre is only about 7 km (4.3 mi) away, while Petaling Jaya is less than 10 km (6.2 mi) away.

There are also primary and secondary schools to be found within walking distance to terrace houses. The Kepong Komuter station is also within walking distance of the schools. The nearest malls are Lotus's Kepong and AEON Metro Prima. Within the Kepong township itself, there are also plenty of recreational places that are frequented by the residents like Taman Rekreasi Bandar Menjalara just five minutes away, with the 90-hectares Kepong Metropolitan Park and FRIM slightly further away. Moreover, there is also a morning wet market in the streets of Taman Bukit Maluri. Much greenery can be found throughout the area. There is a high school, SMK Taman Bukit Maluri and a primary school adjacent to it, SK Taman Bukit Maluri in Taman Bukit Maluri.
