= Sungai Buloh Highway =

Road in Malaysia

Federal Route 54
- Sungai Buloh Highway
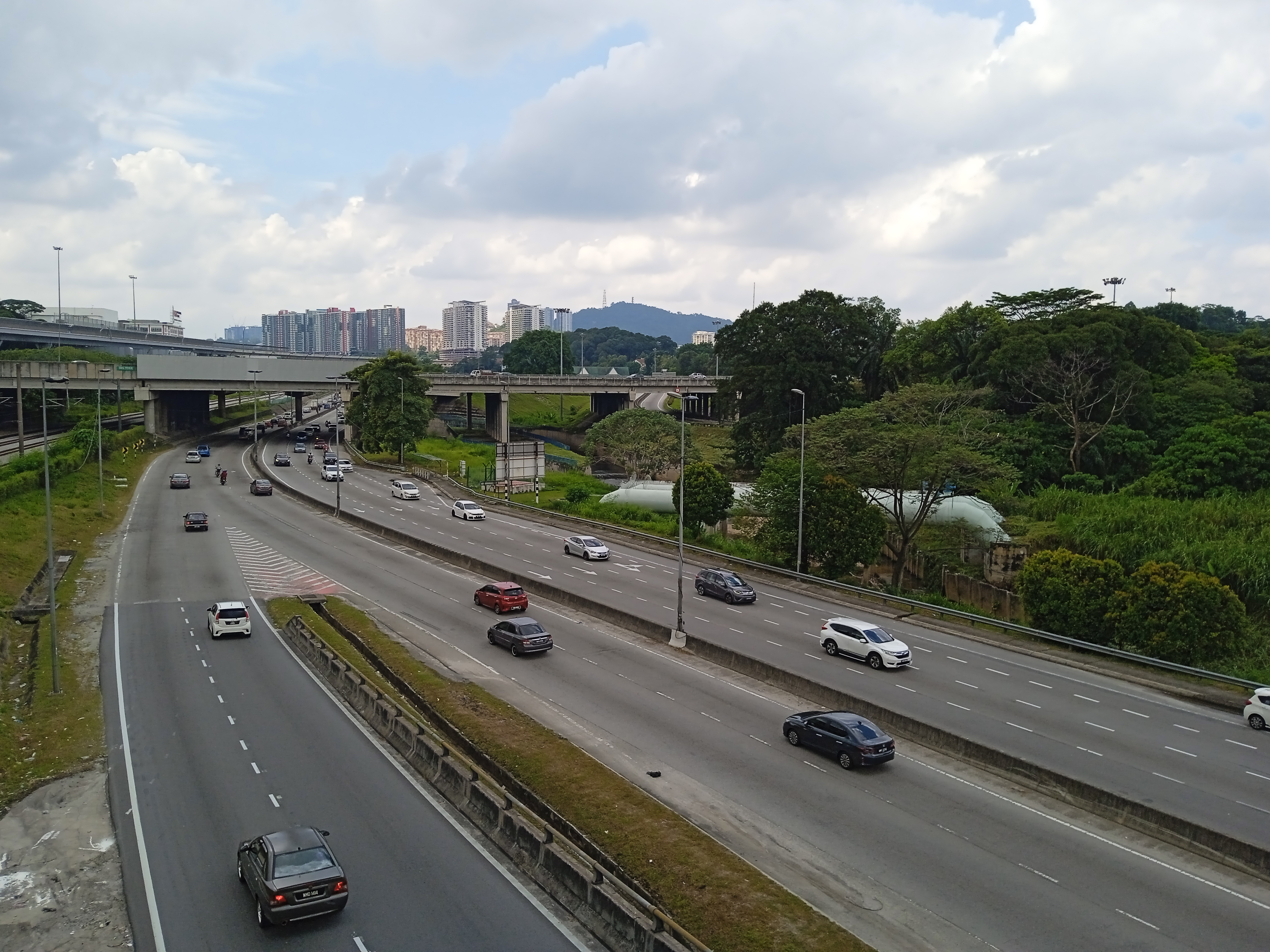

Route information
- Maintained by Malaysian Public Works Department
- Existed: 2004–present
- History: Completed on 2007

Major junctions
- West end: Bukit Rahman Putra Interchange
- FT 54 Federal Route 54; B9 Jalan Hospital; FT 15 B9 Jalan Subang; North–South Expressway Northern Route / AH2; Damansara–Puchong Expressway; FT 28 Kuala Lumpur Middle Ring Road 2
- East end: Sri Damansara Interchange

Location
- Country: Malaysia
- Primary destinations: Kuala Selangor, Paya Jaras, Sungai Buloh, Damansara Damai, Bandar Sri Damansara, Segambut, Jalan Kuching, Kepong, Kuala Lumpur, Petaling Jaya

Highway system
- Highways in Malaysia; Expressways; Federal; State

Sungai Buloh Highway or Jalan Sungai Buloh, Federal Route 54, is a major highway in Klang Valley region, Selangor state, Malaysia. The highway has now been upgraded into six-lane carriageway on 22 June 2007.

== History ==
The highway was upgraded by the Malaysian Public Works Department (JKR) and the two main contractor, Melati Ehsan Holdings Berhad and Desa Purnama Sdn Bhd on 22 June 2007.

The project involved upgrading and expanding the Federal Road 54, this connects to Jalan Kepong, Damansara–Puchong Expressway and to various residential areas at Sungai Buloh, Selangor such as Sierramas, Damansara Damai, and Bandar Sri Damansara. The project involves the construction of new bridges, road upgrades, drainage and utility relocation and two new interchanges.

The Federal Route 54 Upgrading Project is part of the Northern Kuala Lumpur Traffic Dispersal System implemented by the Federal Government to alleviate the chronic traffic congestion along the route. The area surrounding and straddling this section of the route have witnessed rapid growths both in terms of population and traffic.

The project has been divided into two packages with 'Package 1', awarded to Konsortium Melati Ehsan – Desa Purnama. Package 1 involves upgrading a four-km section of Federal Route 54 between the Damansara–Puchong Expressway (LDP) Interchange near Bandar Sri Damansara and the Sungai Buloh-NSE Toll Plaza of the North–South Expressway Northern Route.

== Scope of work ==
The scope of work involved can be summarized as follows:

- Construction of a three-lane dual carriageway road, including drainage, geotechnical works and construction of four bridges including:
  - Elevated U-Turn West Bound and U-Turn East Bound.
  - Directional Ramps from Damansara Damai.
  - Bridge over Sungai Buloh at Kampung Desa Aman.
  - Landscaping, road furniture and street lighting at specified locations.
  - Relocation of public utilities and services where required.

== Interchange lists ==
The entire route is located in Petaling District, Selangor.

Legend:

- I/C - Interchange, I/S - Intersection, RSA - Rest and service area, OBR - Overhead bridge restaurant, R/R - Restaurant and rest plaza, L/B - Layby, V/P - Vista point, TN - tunnel, T/P - Toll plaza, BR - Bridge
- C - Cloverleaf, S - Stack, T-A - Trumpet-A, T-B - Trumpet-B, DT - Directional-T/Y, SDT - Semi-Directional-T/Y, P-Y - Partial-Y, D - Diamond, P-C - Partial cloverleaf, D-D - Diverging diamond, D-R - Direct ramp

Km	Exit	Name	Destinations	Notes
Through to FT 54 Malaysia Federal Route 54
		Bukit Rahman Putra I/C	Persiaran Bukit Rahman Putra 1 – Bukit Rahman Putra	Half-diamond interchange
		Sungai Buloh Army Camp and Arsenal	Sungai Buloh Army Camp and Arsenal	
		Jalan Hospital I/C	B9 Jalan Hospital – Sungai Buloh Hospital, Kampung Batu 13 Sungai Buloh, Sungai Buloh Industrial Park, Sungai Buloh station North–South Expressway Northern Route / AH2 – Bukit Kayu Hitam, Ipoh, Rawang	Trumpet interchange
		Jalan Subang I/C	FT 15 / B9 Malaysia Federal Route 15 – Kota Damansara, Subang, Subang Airport, Subang Jaya, Shah Alam	Half-diamond junctions
		Sungai Buloh-NSE I/C	Jalan Sierramas Utama – Sierramas, Bandar Valencia, Sungai Buloh Hospital; North–South Expressway Northern Route / AH2 – Bukit Kayu Hitam, Ipoh, Rawang, Kuala Lumpur, Klang, Shah Alam, Kuala Lumpur International Airport (KLIA), Johor Bahru, Singapore	Diamond interchange
		Damansara Damai I/C	Jalan PJU 10/1 – Damansara Damai, Prima Damansara	Diamond interchange
		Jalan PJU 10/9 Exit	Jalan PJU 10/9	LILO exit
		Persiaran Industri Exit	Persiaran Industri	LILO exit
		Elevated U-turn	Elevated U-turn – Sungai Buloh; Damansara Damai, Prima Damansara	
		Bandar Sri Damansara I/C	Persiaran Perdana – Bandar Sri Damansara	Trumpet interchange
		Sri Damansara Interchange I/C	Persiaran Utama – Bandar Sri Damansara, Kepong Industrial Area; Damansara–Puchong Expressway – Desa Park City, Damansara, Petaling Jaya, Puchong, Putrajaya, Cyberjaya, Kuala Lumpur International Airport (KLIA)	Half-SPUI interchange with ramp to MRR2
Through to FT 28 (Kuala Lumpur Middle Ring Road 2) / FT 54
