= Imam Al Ghazali Mosque =

Mosque in Kuala Lumpur, Malaysia

Coordinates: 3°11′47.0″N 101°37′41.3″E

- Masjid Imam Al Ghazali

Religion
- Affiliation: Sunni Islam

Location
- Location: Bandar Manjalara, Kuala Lumpur, Malaysia
- Interactive map of Imam Al Ghazali Mosque

Architecture
- Type: Mosque
- Minaret: 1

The Imam Al Ghazali Mosque (Malay: Masjid Imam Al Ghazali) is a mosque in Kuala Lumpur, Malaysia. This mosque is located at Bandar Manjalara and was named after Imam Al-Ghazali, a Muslim philosopher.

== See also ==
- Islam in Malaysia
