= Mohd Ikhmil Fawedz Mohd Hanif =

Malaysian swimmer

Personal information
- Born: November 21, 1974 (age 51) Gombak, Selangor, Malaysia

Sport
- Sport: Swimming

Mohd Ikhmil Fawedz Mohd Hanif (born 21 November 1974) is a Malaysian solo long-distance swimmer, from Gombak, Selangor. Aged 42, he broke the Malaysian record for longest open water swim (previously held by Dato Abdul Malik Mydin) on 2 and 3 May 2015 in Sabah when he swam from Kuala Penyu to Tanjung Aru in 24 hours and 30 minutes.
