= Bandar Kundang =

Town in Gombak, Selangor, Malaysia

Kundang Kundang
- Town
- Kundang
- Interactive map of Kundang
- Coordinates: 3°20′28″N 101°31′21″E
- Country: Malaysia
- District: Gombak
- Time zone: MST (UTC+8)
- Area code: 03

Kundang is a town in Gombak District, Selangor, Malaysia. This town is also known as Rawang by the locals due to its close proximity to nearby Rawang town. The town is governed by the Selayang Municipal Council (MPS), which also governs other areas of the Gombak district such as Selayang, Rawang, Kundang, Gombak Setia, Kuang, Batu Arang (part of Batu Arang), Sungai Buloh (part of Sungai Buloh), and Hulu Kelang (part of Hulu Kelang).
