= Bandar Menjalara =

Township in Kuala Lumpur, Malaysia

Menjalara
- Township
- Bandar Menjalara
- Location within Kuala Lumpur
- Coordinates: 3°11′38″N 101°37′49″E
- Country: Malaysia
- Federal Territory: Kuala Lumpur
- Constituency: Kepong (federal constituency)

Government
  - City council: Kuala Lumpur City Hall (DBKL)
- Postcode: 52200

Bandar Menjalara, often just called Menjalara, or sometimes spelled Manjalara, is a major township in Kuala Lumpur, Malaysia. It is located between Kepong and Sri Damansara. Menjalara is situated adjacent to Taman Bukit Maluri, Desa ParkCity, Bandar Sri Damansara, and Taman Sri Bintang. Previously known as Desa Sri Makhota, it is now named after Paduka Seri Cik Menjalara (Makche Menjalara), the mother of the first Prime Minister of Malaysia, Tunku Abdul Rahman. It was called Edinburgh Estate before its establishment in the 1980s.

Menjalara is located adjacent to the Damansara–Puchong Expressway (LDP). Bandar Menjalara Community Hall is located beside the Menjalara Lake Park, both of which are owned by Kuala Lumpur City Hall (DBKL).

A ramp for the Duta–Ulu Klang Expressway are located at the intersection between Bandar Menjalara and Taman Bukit Maluri. Menjalara is also accessible via Kuala Lumpur Middle Ring Road 2 (MRR2). There is a MRT Feeder Bus Route for Bandar Menjalara (T108) which comes from the Sri Damansara Sentral MRT Station.

== Education ==
- SMK Manjalara
- Sekolah Menengah Agama Kuala Lumpur
- Sekolah Rendah Jenis Kebangsaan (Cina) Kepong 3
- Seri Stamford College

== Facilities ==
- Imam Al Ghazali Mosque
- Dewan Komuniti Bandar Menjalara
- Lotus's Kepong
- Menjalara Lake Park (Malay: Taman Tasik Menjalara, Area: 10.5 hectares)
