= Jalan Pinggiran Batu Caves =

Road in Malaysia

Major junctions
- North end: Pinggiran Batu Caves
- FT 28 Kuala Lumpur Middle Ring Road 2
- South end: Taman Sri Gombak on Kuala Lumpur Middle Ring Road 2

Location
- Country: Malaysia
- Primary destinations: Taman Bolton, Taman Sri Gombak, Taman Gemilang, Kampung Melayu Wira Damai

Highway system
- Highways in Malaysia; Expressways; Federal; State

Jalan Pinggiran Batu Caves is a major roads in Klang Valley region, Selangor, Malaysia.

== Junction list ==
Location	km	mi	Name	Destinations	Notes
Pinggiran Batu Caves			Pinggiran Batu Caves	Kampung Melayu Wira Damai, Pinggiran Batu Caves, Taman Gemilang	
Pinggiran Batu Caves			Kuala Lumpur panoramic view		
Taman Sri Gombak			Taman Sri Gombak	Taman Sri Gombak	
Taman Sri Gombak			Taman Bolton	Taman Bolton	
Taman Sri Gombak			Taman Sri Gombak-MRR2	FT 28 Kuala Lumpur Middle Ring Road 2 – Taman Samudera, Batu Caves, Kuala Lumpur, Ipoh, Kepong, Sungai Buloh, Petaling Jaya, Gombak, Sentul, Kuantan, Genting Highlands, Ulu Klang, Ampang	Half diamond interchange
1.000 mi = 1.609 km; 1.000 km = 0.621 mi
