= Selangor State Route B21 =

Road in Malaysia

Selangor Route 21
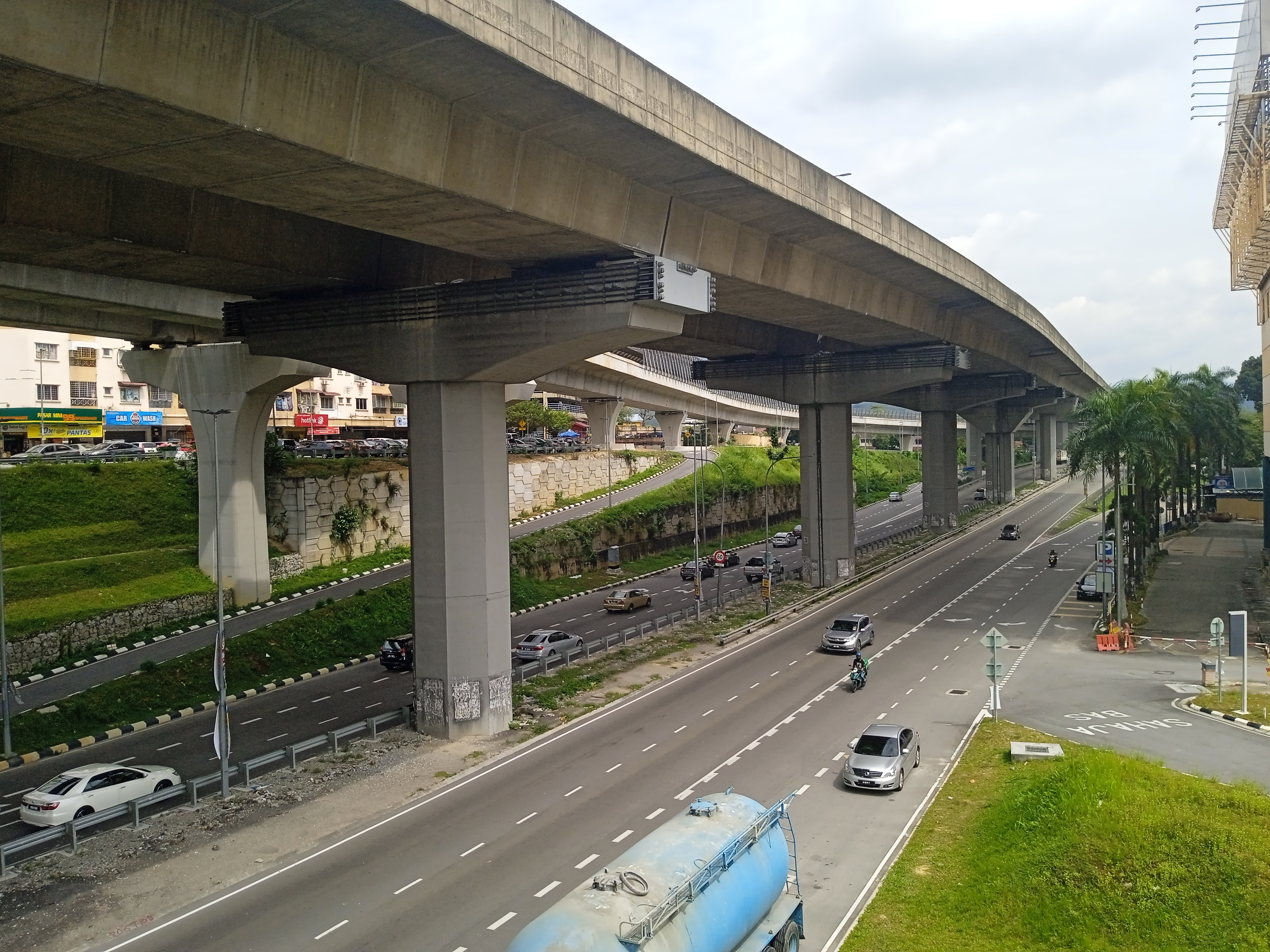

Major junctions
- Northeast end: Bandar Baru Selayang
- FT 1 Kuala Lumpur–Rawang Highway; Jalan Taman Bidara; FT 28 Kuala Lumpur Middle Ring Road 2
- Southwest end: Kepong

Location
- Country: Malaysia
- Primary destinations: Rawang

Highway system
- Highways in Malaysia; Expressways; Federal; State

Selangor State Route B21, Kepong–Selayang Highway is a major highway in Klang Valley region, Selangor, Malaysia. It is also a shortcut route to Rawang from Kepong and Sungai Buloh.

== Junction lists ==
The entire route is located in Gombak District, Selangor.

Legend:

- I/C - Interchange, I/S - Intersection, RSA - Rest and service area, OBR - Overhead bridge restaurant, R/R - Restaurant and rest plaza, L/B - Layby, V/P - Vista point, TN - tunnel, T/P - Toll plaza, BR - Bridge
- C - Cloverleaf, S - Stack, T-A - Trumpet-A, T-B - Trumpet-B, DT - Directional-T/Y, SDT - Semi-Directional-T/Y, P-Y - Partial-Y, D - Diamond, P-C - Partial cloverleaf, D-D - Diverging diamond, D-R - Direct ramp

Location	km	mi	Name	Destinations	Notes
Kepong			Kepong; Taman Kepong Indah-MRR2	FT 28 Kuala Lumpur Middle Ring Road 2 – Kepong, Kuala Lumpur, Petaling Jaya, Sungai Buloh, Batu Caves, Gombak, Kuantan, Genting Highlands, Ulu Klang, Ampang	Diamond interchange
Kepong			Taman Daya		
Kepong			Jalan Ehsan Utama-Taman Kepong Indah	Jalan Ehsan Utama – Taman Ehsan, Taman FRIM Kepong, Forest Research Institute Malaysia (FRIM); Jalan 7/1a – Taman Kepong Indah	
Bandar Baru Selayang			Taman Industri Selayang		
Bandar Baru Selayang			Taman Selayang Utama		
Bandar Baru Selayang			Jalan Taman Bidara	Jalan Taman Bidara – Taman Bidara, Rawang, Ipoh	
Bandar Baru Selayang			Taman Selayang Jaya	Jalan Taman Selayang Jaya – Taman Selayang Jaya	
Bandar Baru Selayang			Selayang Hospital	Selayang Hospital	Half diamond interchange
Bandar Baru Selayang			Taman Seri Melati		
Bandar Baru Selayang			Kuala Lumpur–Rawang Highway	FT 1 Kuala Lumpur–Rawang Highway – Rawang, Ipoh, Selayang, Batu Caves, Kuala Lumpur	Diamond interchange
Bandar Baru Selayang			Bandar Baru Selayang	Persiaran 1 – Bandar Baru Selayang Industrial Park, Selayang Municipal Council (MPS) main headquarters, MPS Stadium, Malaysian Examination Council (MPM), Gombak district and land office	Roundabout
1.000 mi = 1.609 km; 1.000 km = 0.621 mi
