= Gombak LRT station =

Train station in Gombak, Selangor, Malaysia

Coordinates: 3°13′52.4″N 101°43′27.9″E

KJ1 Gombak
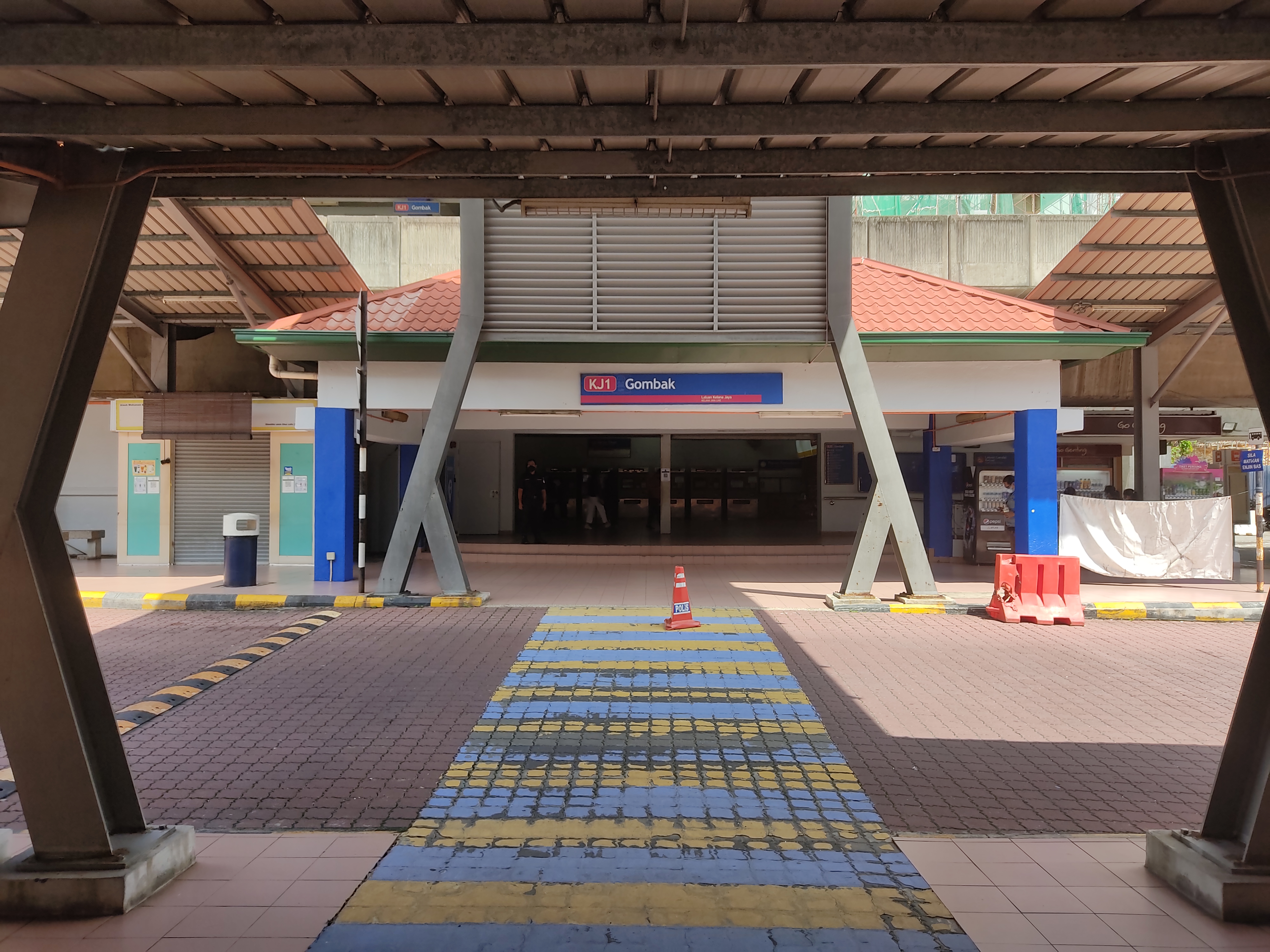

General information
- Other names: Malay: ڬومبق (Jawi); Chinese: 鹅唛; Tamil: கோம்பாக்
- Location: Jalan Terminal Putra, Taman Melati; 53100 Selangor; Malaysia
- System: Rapid KL
- Owner: Prasarana Malaysia (LRT); Malaysia Rail Link Sdn Bhd (ECRL)
- Operator: Rapid Rail
- Line: 5 Kelana Jaya Line
- Platforms: 1 island platform
- Tracks: 2

Construction
- Structure type: Elevated
- Parking: Available with payment. 1439 total parking bays. (with 24 disabilities parking bays and 155 women parking bays)
- Accessible: Yes

Other information
- Station code: KJ1

History
- Opened: 1 June 1999; 27 years ago (LRT)
- Opening: 12 December 2026; 19 days' time (ECRL)
- Former names: Terminal PUTRA

Services
Preceding station		Following station
Terminus	Kelana Jaya Line	Taman Melati towards Putra Heights
Future development
Preceding station	Malaysia Rail Link	Following station
Terminus	East Coast Rail Link	Gombak Utara towards Kota Bharu
Location

The Gombak LRT station is a major Malaysian interchange station located in the Gombak District of the state of Selangor, Malaysia. It is the northern terminus of the LRT Kelana Jaya Line. The station mainly consist of the elevated LRT station, integrated with the Terminal Bersepadu Gombak (TBG) bus terminal complex and connected to the future East Coast Rail Link (ECRL) station.

There is a ticket counter for buses to Genting Highlands, with buses departing to the Genting Skyway station every half-hour. These buses are operated by Genting Malaysia Berhad. This station is normally utilised by residents of Kuala Lumpur, especially those living around the Setapak area when they are going to Genting.

The Gombak toll plaza, the beginning of the East Coast Expressway, is one kilometre north from this station.

== Lines ==
=== LRT Kelana Jaya Line ===
An elevated light rapid transit (LRT) station is the base of this station complex, along with a multi-storey parking lot building. Both the station, then known as Terminal PUTRA, opened in 1999 as the northeastern terminus of the Kelana Jaya Line (then known as the PUTRA LRT).

This station contains two levels: The access point, ticket machines and concourse are all on street level, while the platforms are on the first and only elevated level. All levels are linked via stairways, escalators and elevators designated for physically challenged passengers. The station uses a single island platform between two tracks, both tracks for trains travelling in the direction of Putra Heights, and is entirely sheltered by a gabled roof supported by latticed frames.

==== Terminal stabling sidings ====
Beyond the passenger platforms, the station includes a terminal stabling area used for parking Kelana Jaya Line trains at the end of the line. The stabling area originally had four parking sidings.

The stabling area was expanded in phases. In 2014, two additional parking sidings were added on the western side of the stabling area. A roof structure and platform were also constructed during this upgrade to support the stabling of parked trains. In 2016, another siding was added on the eastern side, increasing the total number of parking sidings from four to seven.

Each siding is generally able to accommodate either two 2-car trainsets or one 4-car trainset, depending on the train formation being stabled.

=== East Coast Rail Link (ECRL) ===
A train station that will be served by the East Coast Railway Link (ECRL) is currently under construction near the LRT station. Once completed, it will be integrated with the LRT station and the Terminal Bersepadu Gombak (TBG) bus hub. The station is situated on the Gombak spur line of the railway line, with the station serveing as the terminus of the spur line.

It will have a side platform and an island platform, which will serve trains up to Kota Bharu, Kelantan and the East Coast region of Peninsular Malaysia, as well as the northwestern and western sides of the state of Selangor such as Puncak Alam and Port Klang.

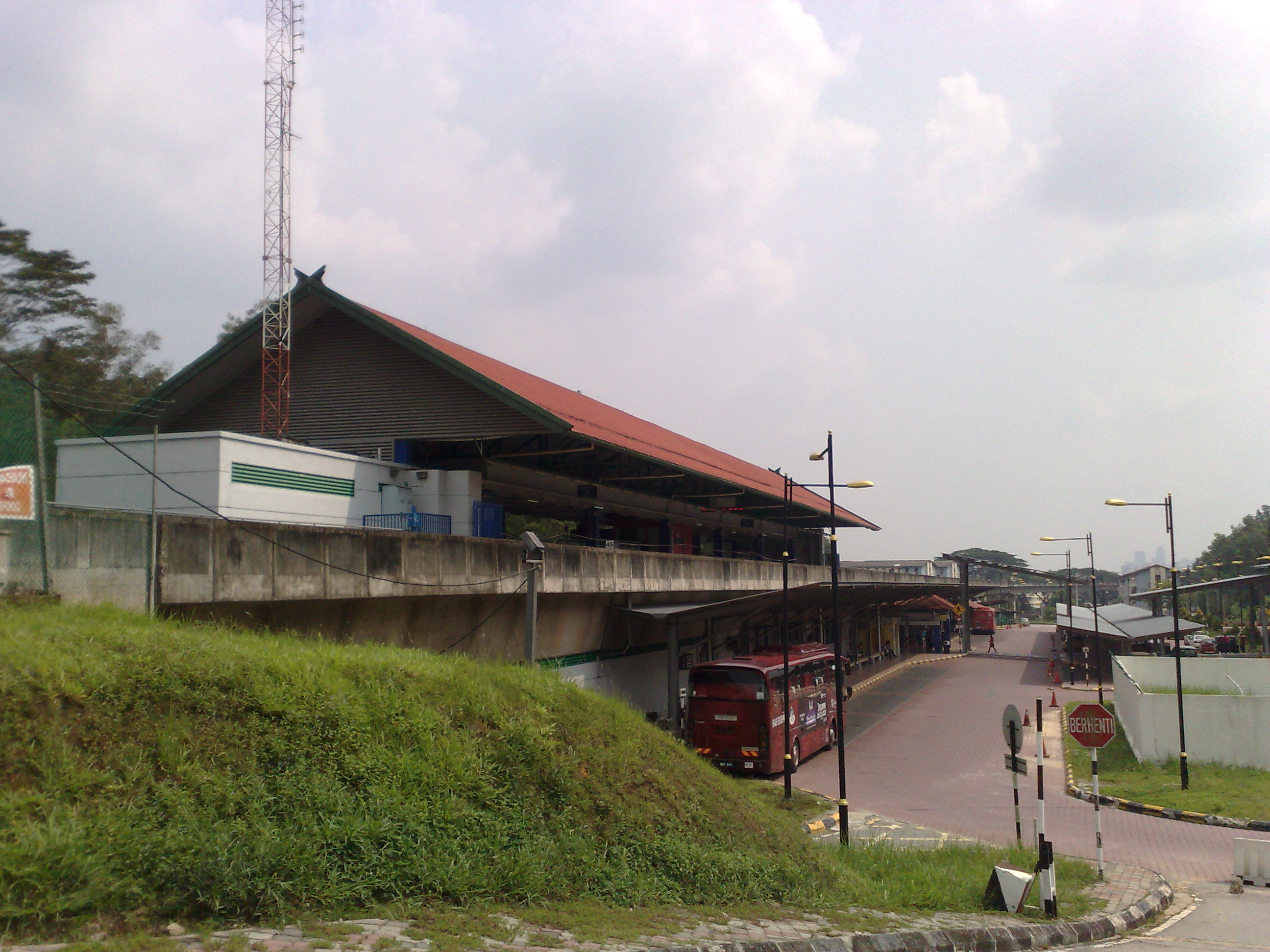
Gombak LRT station

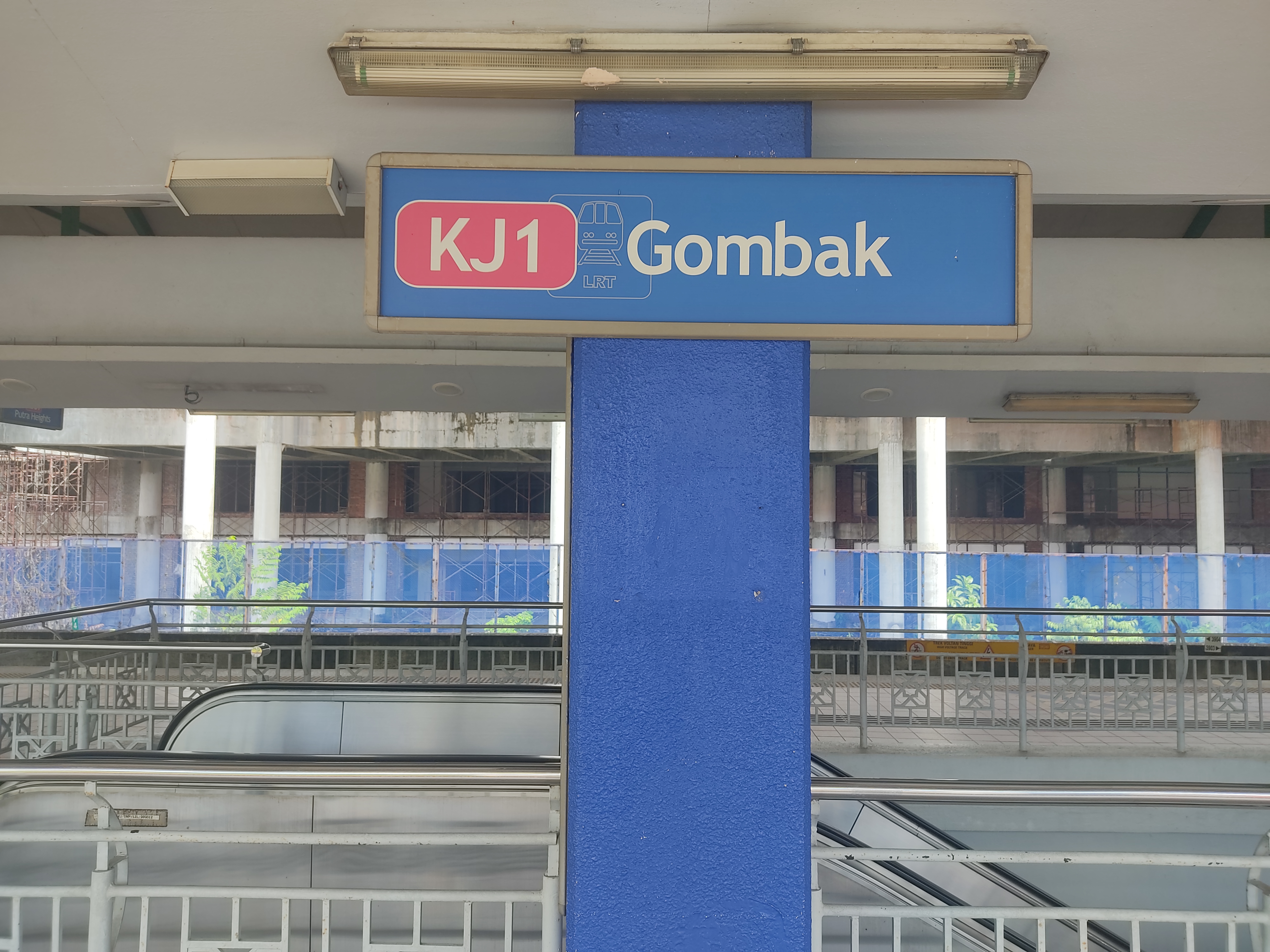
LRT station signboard

== Terminal Bersepadu Gombak ==
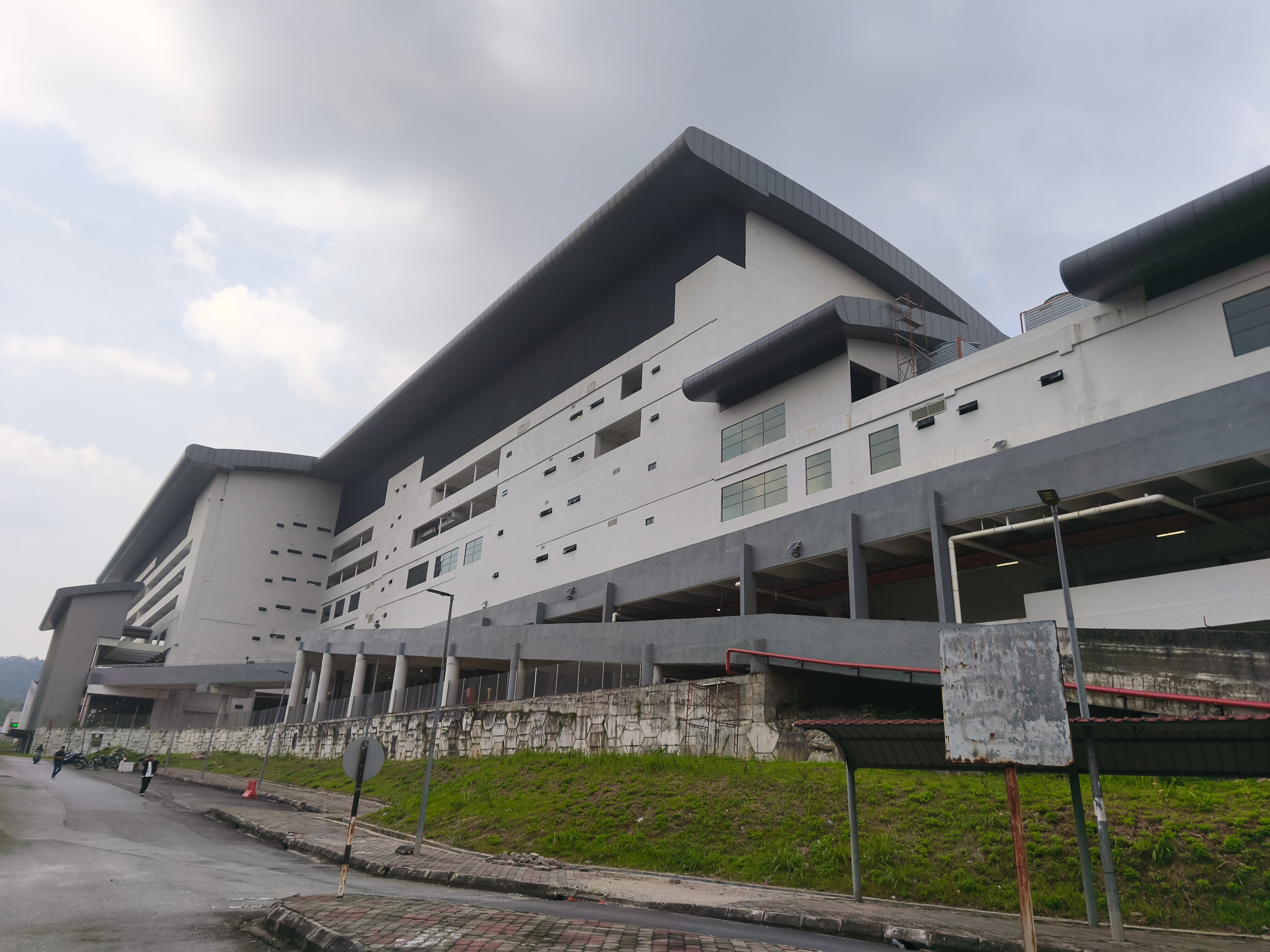
Gombak Integrated Terminal

Terminal Bersepadu Gombak (TBG; lit. ' Gombak Integrated Terminal'), also known as ITT Gombak, is a major long-distance bus terminal located behind and is physically connected to the Gombak LRT station via a covered pedestrian walkway.

TBG is one of the three planned Integrated Transport Terminals (ITT) in Greater Kuala Lumpur, part of the decentralisation strategy for public transport alongside Terminal Bersepadu Selatan (TBS; lit.: Southern Integrated Terminal) for the south and the planned Sungai Buloh ITT for the north. It serves as the principal hub for express buses heading to the East Coast of Peninsular Malaysia (Pahang, Terengganu and Kelantan).

=== History ===
The terminal was conceived to modernise express bus services and relieve congestion in the city centre. Originally, East Coast-bound buses operated from the Pekeliling Bus Terminal near Titiwangsa station or TBS.

==== Construction and Delays ====
Construction of the terminal, initially named Terminal Bersepadu Timur (Eastern Integrated Terminal), began near the Gombak LRT station with an original opening target of 2020. The project faced significant delays, most notably due to a structural collapse incident on 23 May 2019, which resulted in the deaths of five workers.

==== Opening ====
The project, which totaled a cost of RM307.4 million, eventually commenced operations in phases in March 2025:

- 15 March 2025: Opened for bus arrivals.
- 22 March 2025: Opened for bus departures.

The ceremonial official opening was officiated by Prime Minister Anwar Ibrahim on 29 September 2025.

=== Location and facilities ===
The terminal is strategically sited next to the Kuala Lumpur Middle Ring Road 2 (MRR2) and the Kuala Lumpur–Karak Expressway, allowing East Coast buses to bypass the heavy traffic of Kuala Lumpur city centre.

Facilities include a Centralised Ticketing System (CTS) to eliminate touting, 60 bus platforms, 150 taxi bays, and park-and-ride facilities.

== Connections ==
Route No.	Via	Connecting to	Reachable
T200	Jalan Taman Melati 1/5; FT 28 Kuala Lumpur Middle Ring Road 2 (MRR2); Lingkaran UIA	200	IIUM
T201	Jalan Taman Melati 1/5; FT 28 Kuala Lumpur Middle Ring Road 2 (MRR2); Lebuh Utama Sri Gombak; Jalan Makmur; Jalan Lintang; Jalan Permai; Jalan Gombak Permai 2	170; 171; 202; BET17	Al-Khairiah Mosques(Taman Seri Gombak); Sri Gombak Commercial Centre; SMK Hillcrest; Taman Prima Sri Gombak
MPS1	Jalan Taman Melati 1/5; FT 28 Kuala Lumpur Middle Ring Road 2 (MRR2); Jalan Sungai Pusu; Jalan Gombak; KC05 Batu Caves; Jalan Sungai Tua; Selayang Baru; Kepong–Selayang Highway; Bandar Baru Selayang	151	SBP Integrasi Gombak; SK Gombak Utara; SK Sungai Pusu; Gombak Vocational College; Sri Gombak Commercial Centre; Giant Hypermarket Batu Caves; Sungai Chinchin Mosques
Genting Express	East Coast Expressway and Kuala Lumpur-Karak Expressway	Awana Skyway	Genting Highlands; Chin Swee Caves Temple; Genting Highlands Premium Outlets
509	East Coast Expressway and Kuala Lumpur-Karak Expressway	Terminal Bas Ekspres Raub	Bukit Tinggi; Bentong

== See also ==
- LRT Kelana Jaya Line
- MRL East Coast Rail Link
- Klang Valley Integrated Transit System
- Rail transport in Malaysia
