= Bukit Rahman Putra =

Township in Selangor, Malaysia

Coordinates: 3.217409°N 101.5563771°E

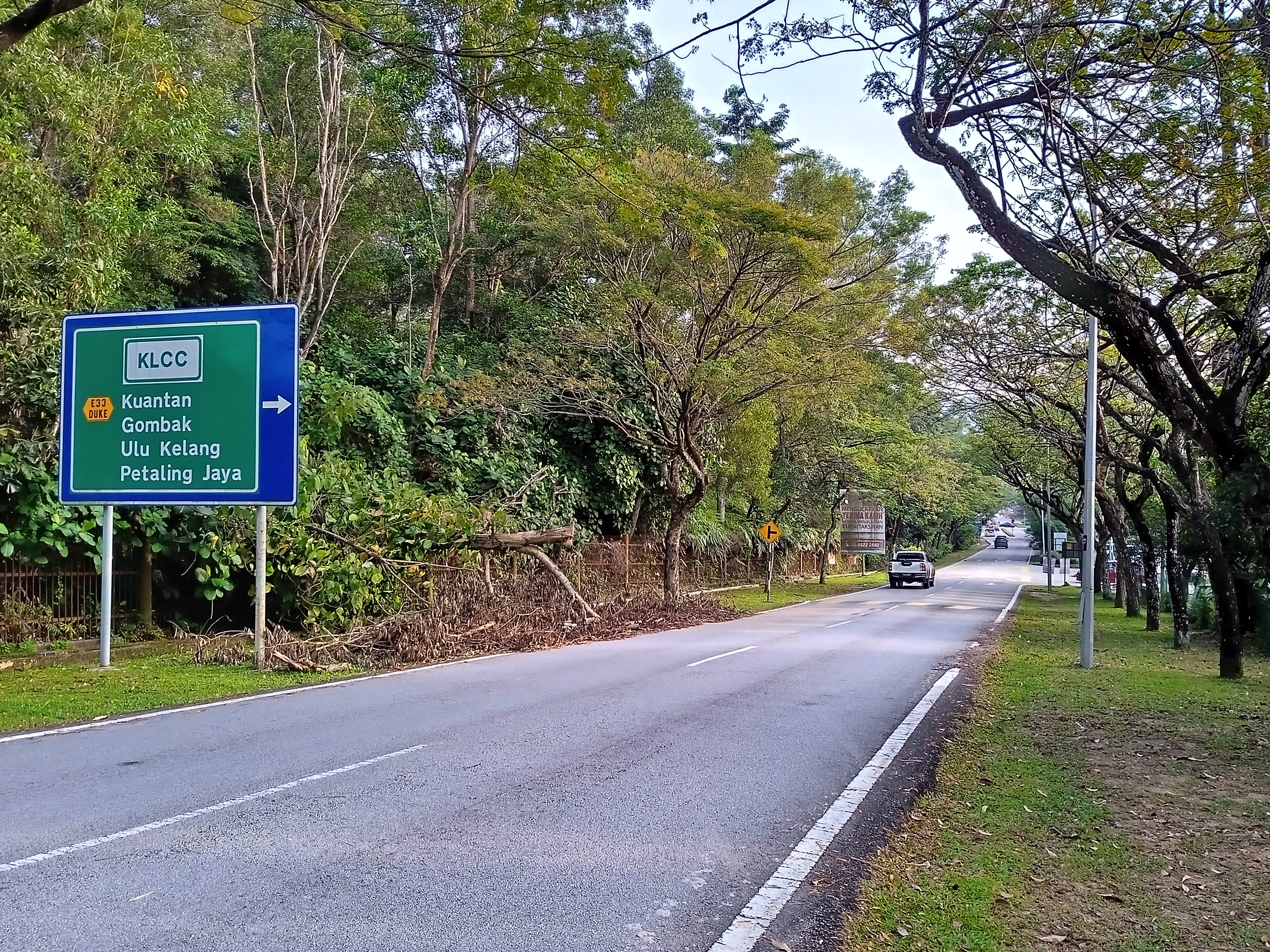
Bukit Rahman Putra

Bukit Rahman Putra is a township in Sungai Buloh, Selangor, Malaysia. The township was established in 1994 by Sabna Corporation, a private Bumiputra-owned company, and was named after the first Malaysian prime minister, Tunku Abdul Rahman Putra Al-Haj.

Along with Bukit Rahman Putra as the residential development project, the township also include the Rahman Putra Golf Club, a 36-hole golf course which opened in January 1993, and Putra Industrial Park.

== History ==
The terraced homes sold in Bukit Rahman Putra in 1994 were at RM 148,888, rising to RM 500,000 in 2020.

A Ducati showroom opened in the township in October 2024, covering 1,500 square feet (140 m^{2}) and built at a cost of RM 2.5 million.

== Transportation ==
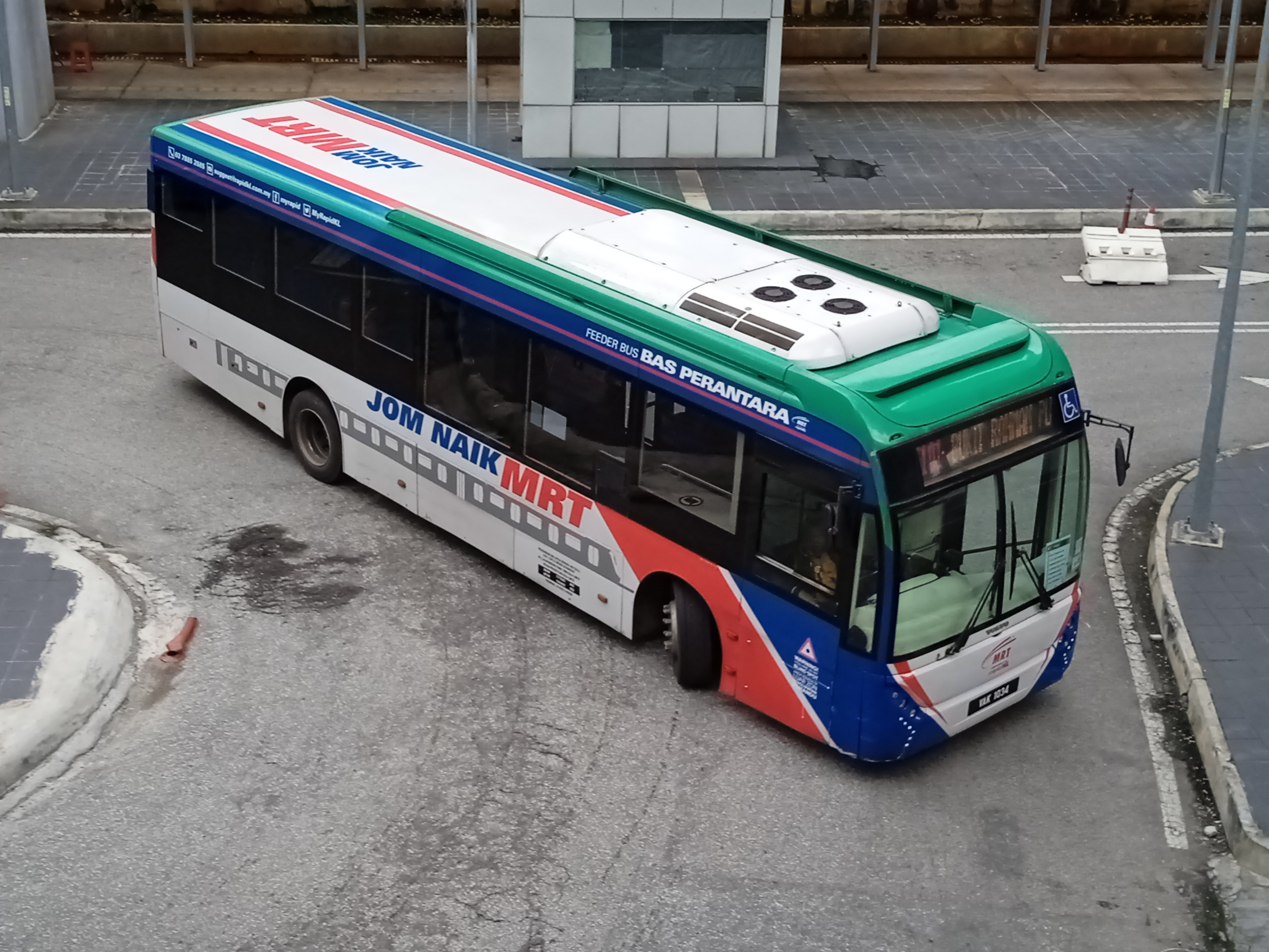
Rapid KL bus route T101 at Sungai Buloh MRT Station, 2023.

The area is accessible by Rapid KL MRT feeder bus (Bas Perantara MRT) route T101 from Sungai Buloh MRT station to Bukit Rahman Putra.

== Religion ==
- Bukit Rahman Putra Mosque
