= Tasik Biru Seri Kundang =

Lake in Gombak, Selangor, Malaysia

- Location within Selangor
- Location: Kampung Melayu Sri Kundang, Rawang, Selangor, Malaysia
- Coordinates: 3.2501292°N 101.5235633°E

Tasik Biru Seri Kundang is a recreational lake located at Kampung Melayu Sri Kundang, Rawang, Selangor, Malaysia, a village near to Sungai Buloh. It is an ex-mining lake that used to be developed long time ago during the British colonial time. During its olden days, the lake was used to be the biggest mining area in Rawang district, and one of the biggest in Selangor as well. It is about 25 km to the north from Kuala Lumpur.

After the colonial time, Tasik Biru is set to be a water sports and recreation centre for the local and foreign tourists. The area surrounding the lake, encompassing about 32 hectares (80 acres) would be upgraded with a recreation area and a jogging track around the lake.

== History ==
Tasik Biru or literally means 'The Blue Lake' is said to have the name due to its blueish colour that caused by the depth of the lake itself. Some said, the colour is greenish as well. The lake has an island in the middle of the lake, make it different as any other recreational area in Selangor. For the local folks, there is a story saying that the island is floating by itself. Most of the people believe it is just a mystic.

== Activities ==
Tasik Biru is also a well-known recreational area among locals and tourists, especially those who love jet-skiing, picnicking and sometimes canoeing. The lake is also famous with its status as a multipurpose area, from a place for water activities, to a film shooting site. One of the famous film that used Tasik Biru as its location was Bara, a film by Datuk Yusuf Haslam. It is also a popular weekend hangout from people from surrounding area, with families coming for picnic and fishing.

Fishing is quite popular among the visitors, despite the low success rate. Main target species is probably the exotic peacock bass (Cichla ocellaris), the rare giant snakehead and the locally called "diamond fish". Due to the lake's location which is close to Kuala Lumpur and surrounding area, the first two species receives heavy pressure from bait casters and fly fishers.

== Transportation ==
To visit Tasik Biru (The Blue Lake) people may take buses or taxis (bus runs during peak periods only - morning, mid-day and evening after work), and it is advisable to come with private transport or carpool. While those who come from Kuala Lumpur may choose to take the Rawang Interchange EXIT 116 from the North-South Expressway, the Guthrie Corridor Expressway from Rawang South Interchange EXIT 115, the road from Batang Berjuntai or the trunk road to Rawang. As recently as 1 September 2014, Exit 2505 to Jalan Kundang was officially opened on LATAR highway, which is about 2 km from the lake.

As an alternative way, one can take MRR2 or LDP heading towards Kepong and take the signboard to Sungai Buloh or Kuang. People who come by commuter train, may drop by at Sungai Buloh, Kuang or Rawang station and take taxis to the lake.

== See also ==
- List of lakes of Malaysia
