= Bandar Baru Selayang =

- Town and district capital
- Motto: Mampan, Progresif, Sejahtera ('Sustainable, Progressive, Prosperous')
- Interactive map of Bandar Baru Selayang
- Coordinates: 3°14′46.7″N 101°39′17.1″E
- Country: Malaysia
- State: Selangor
- District: Gombak
- Established: 1997
- Time zone: UTC+8 (Malaysian Standard Time)

Bandar Baru Selayang is the capital of Gombak District, Selangor, Malaysia. The capital moved from Rawang to Bandar Baru Selayang in 1997. The capital is named after Selayang, a town located 2 km southeast of Selayang Newtown.

Bandar Baru Selayang is also a major residential area in Selayang with a number of neighbourhoods and apartment complexes.

== Neighbourhoods ==
1. Dataran Templer
2. Pinggiran Templer
3. Sungai Tua

== Apartment complexes ==
1. Kenanga
2. Teratai
3. Dahlia (A) and (B)
4. Cempaka
5. Seroja
6. Julia
7. Melor
8. Kipark
9. Bomba
10. Mas Merah
11. Mas Ayu

Bandar Baru Selayang also has a multi-purpose stadium, a public library, mosque, court and three primary schools.

== Schools ==
1. Sekolah Kebangsaan Bandar Baru Selayang
2. Sekolah Kebangsaan Bandar Baru Selayang (2)
3. Sekolah Agama Rendah Al-Furqan

== Clinic and hospital ==
1. Hospital Selayang
2. Klinik Kesihatan Selayang Baru

== Transport ==
=== Bus services ===
Bandar Baru Selayang is accessible from Kuala Lumpur by Rapid KL buses 151, MRT Feeder bus T114 from Metro Prima MRT station and Smart Selangor free bus MPS1 (to Gombak LRT Station) and MPS4 (to Wangsa Permai, Kepong).
