= Gombak District =

- District of Selangor
- Daerah Gombak
- Interactive map of Gombak District
- Location of Gombak District in Malaysia
- Coordinates: 3°16′27.3″N 101°34′14.6″E
- Country: Malaysia
- State: Selangor
- Seat: Bandar Baru Selayang
- Local area government(s): Selayang Municipal Council (West); Ampang Jaya Municipal Council (East)

Government
  - District officer: Amirul Azizan Abdul Rahim
  - Sultan's Representative: Wan Mahmood Pawanteh

Area
  - Total: 650.08 km^{2} (251.00 sq mi)

Population (2020)
  - Total: 942,336
  - Density: 1,449.6/km^{2} (3,754.4/sq mi)
- Time zone: UTC+8 (MST)
  - Summer (DST): UTC+8 (Not observed)
- Postcode: 48000 (Rawang); 48010 (Bandar Sungai Buaya Rawang); 48020 (Bandar Tasik Puteri, Kundang); 48050 (Kuang, Gamuda Gardens); 48100 (Batu Arang); 52100 (Kepong-Selangor, mainly at FRIM, Desa Aman Puri and Taman Ehsan); 52200 (Wangsa Permai, KIP Industrial Park); 53100 (Melawati, Klang Gates, Sungai Pusu, Gombak Utara); 53300 (Taman Permata); 54200 (Keramat AU1-AU5); 68000 (Kemensah Heights, Bukit Antarabangsa, Ukay Perdana); 68100 (Batu Caves, Bandar Baru Selayang)
- Calling code: +6-03-41, +6-03-60, +6-03-61, +6-3-62
- Vehicle registration plates: B

The Gombak District is an administrative district located in the eastern-central part of the state of Selangor, Malaysia. The district was created on February 1, 1974, the same day when Kuala Lumpur was declared a Federal Territory.

== History ==
Gombak district was formed by combining portions of the former Greater Kuala Lumpur district and Rawang in February 1974. Until 1997, Rawang was the district capital; the capital has been moved to Bandar Baru Selayang.

Gombak (town) also refers to as a locality (town/area/suburb) in the northern and central portion of the Setapak subdistrict (both in Gombak and Kuala Lumpur). Before 1974, Gombak was a town before it became a district. Gombak was home to the settlements of the first Minangkabau immigrants in the 1800s and was established soon after. Old mosques in the Gombak area such as the Masjid Lama Batu 6 Gombak are still standing to this day. Today, Gombak can be referred to both the town and district itself but the locals usually refers Gombak as the town, not the district.

== Geography ==
Gombak borders the Federal Territory of Kuala Lumpur to the south, the Ulu Selangor district to the north, Kuala Selangor District to the west, Petaling District to the southwest, Ulu Langat District to the southeast, and the State of Pahang to the east. Both Gombak and Kuala Lumpur, along with some other districts in Selangor, are situated within the Klang Valley. Other localities in Gombak district include Batu Arang, Kuang, Rawang, Kundang, Gombak town, Selayang, Batu Caves and Hulu Kelang.

Gombak River starts from this district and merges with the larger Klang River in Kuala Lumpur. The meeting place of the two rivers is the symbolic birthplace of Kuala Lumpur. At the center of the confluence is the elegant Masjid Jamek.

=== Administrative divisions ===

Gombak District is divided into 4 mukims, which are:

- Batu
- Rawang
- Setapak
- Ulu Klang

=== Government ===
Gombak is partly administrated by two different local governments completely within it, which fall under the state jurisdiction, not the district:

- Ampang Jaya Municipal Council (Among Mukim Ulu Kelang of the district)
- Selayang Municipal Council (Most part of district except Mukim Ulu Kelang area)

== Demographics ==
Historical population
Year	Pop.	±%
1991	352,649	—
2000	537,525	+52.4%
2010	668,694	+24.4%
2020	942,336	+40.9%

The following is based on Department of Statistics Malaysia 2010 census.

Ethnic groups in Gombak, 2010 census
Ethnicity	Population	Percentage
Bumiputera	396,012	62.9%
Chinese	147,488	23.4%
Indian	76,773	12.2%
Others	9,698	1.5%
Total	629,971	100%

Gombak has one of the largest Hui Muslim Communities in Malaysia. Nearly 60% of Hui Chinese live in Gombak.

== Education ==
The main campus of the International Islamic University Malaysia (IIUM/UIAM) is located in Gombak town.

National education is under the purview of the Gombak District Education Office. As of 2014, there were 53 national type primary schools, eight national type (Chinese) primary schools, seven national type (Tamil) primary schools, 30 national type secondary schools (SMK), two national type secondary boarding schools (SM Berasrama Penuh), two national type secondary Islam religious school (SM Agama), Pirvate schools and two national type secondary vocational schools (Kolej Vokasional).

== Tourist attractions ==
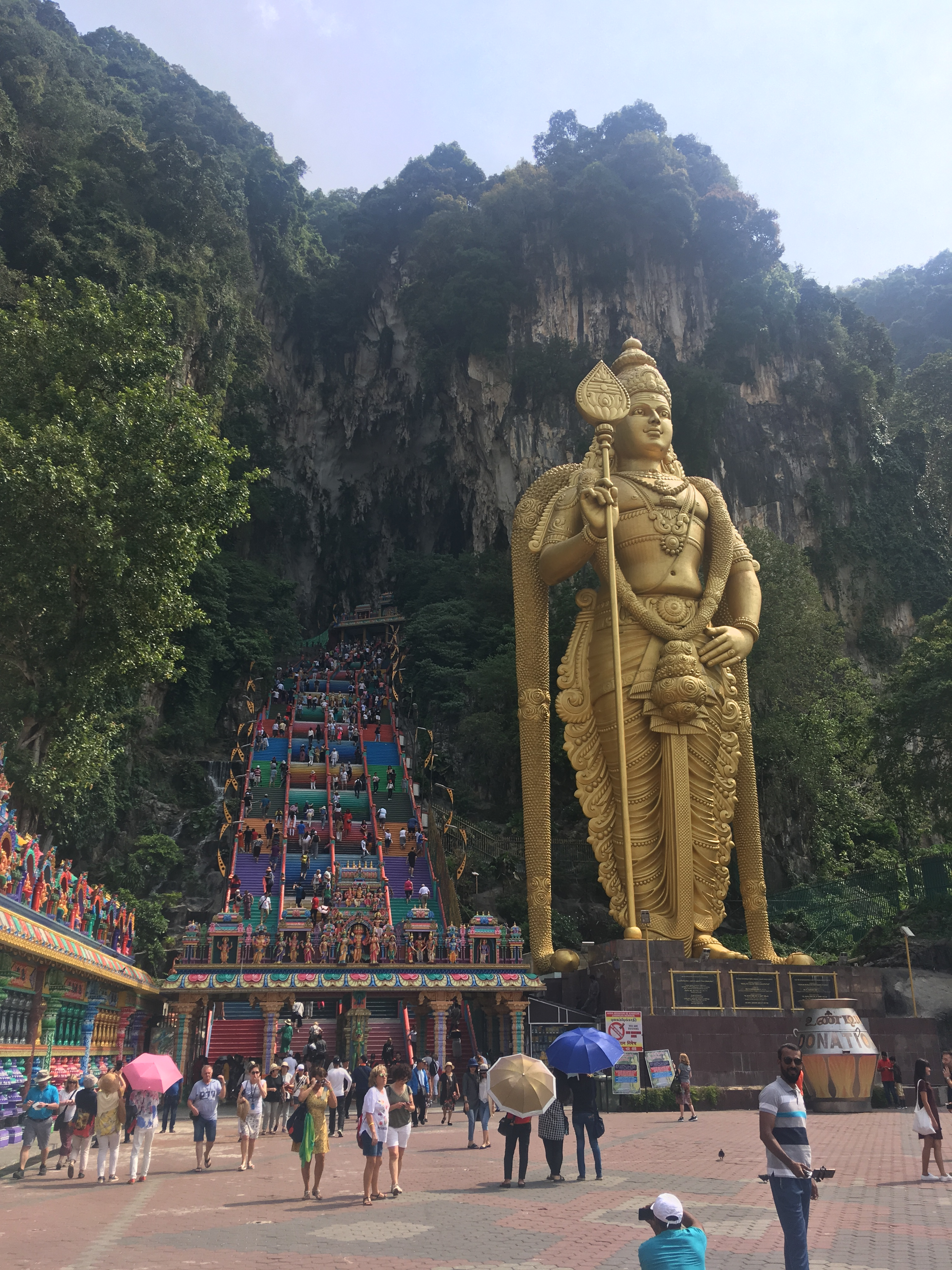
Statue of Murugan at Batu Caves

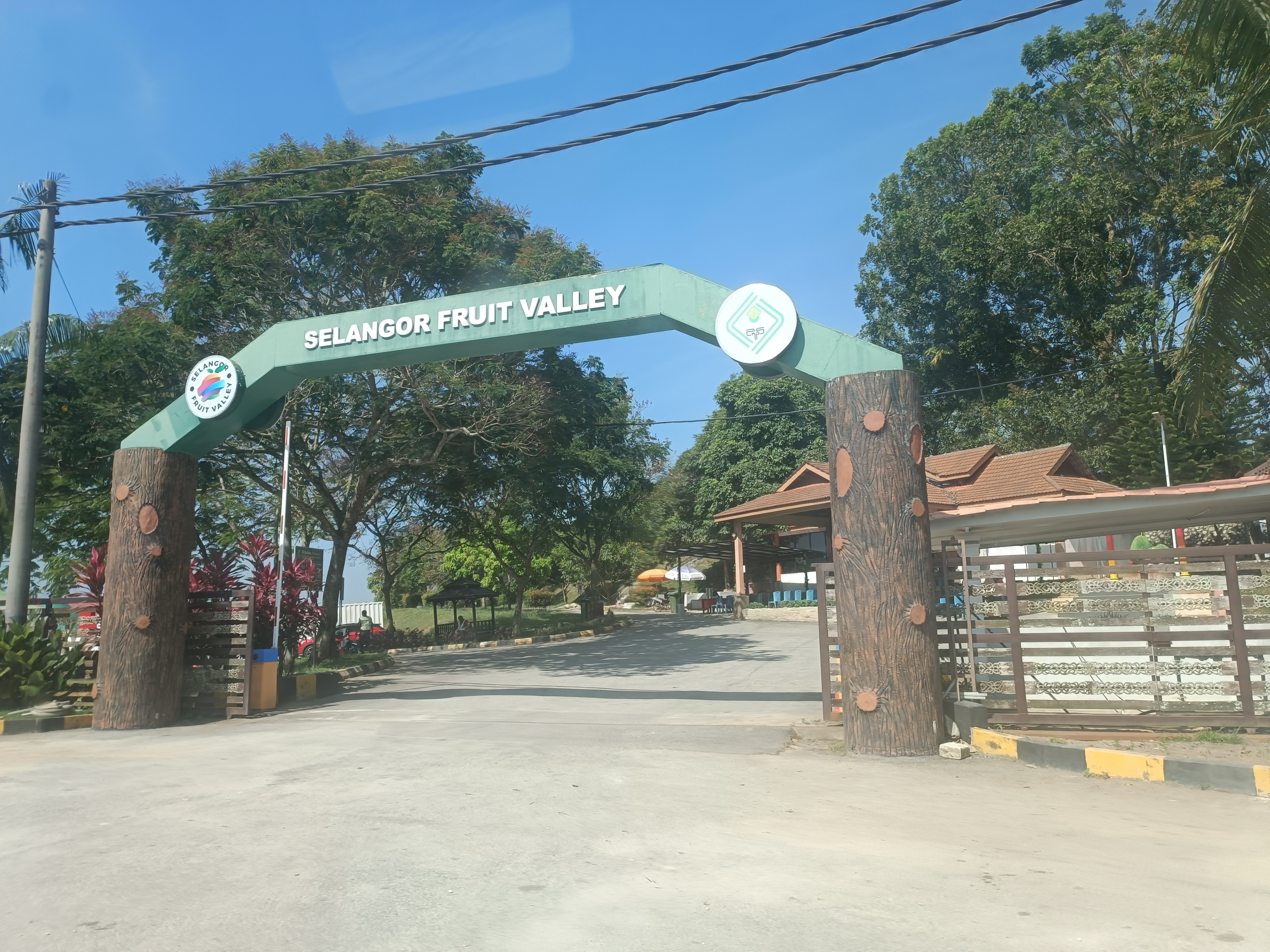
Selangor Fruit Valley at Batu Arang

Gombak has a large amount of recreational area and tourist attraction.

1. Batu Caves
2. Forest Research Institute Malaysia
3. Batu Dam, Batu Caves
4. Gua Damai Extreme Park, Batu Caves
5. Batu Arang Heritage Town
6. Orang Asli Museum, Gombak
7. Hutan Lipur Bukit Lagong, Selayang
8. Hutan Lipur Sungai Tua, Selayang
9. Kancing Forest Park, Rawang
10. Selayang Hot Spring, Selayang
11. Commonwealth Forest Park, Rawang
12. Templer Park, Rawang
13. Tasik Biru Kundang, Kundang
14. National Zoo of Malaysia
15. Klang Gates Dam
16. Batu Asah Waterfall, Hulu Kelang
17. Ampang Forest Reserve, Hulu Kelang
18. Selangor Fruit Valley, Batu Arang

== Federal Parliament and State Assembly Seats ==
List of Gombak district representatives in the Federal Parliament (Dewan Rakyat)

Parliament	Seat Name	Member of Parliament	Party
P97	Selayang	William Leong Jee Keen	Pakatan Harapan (PKR)
P98	Gombak	Amirudin Shari	Pakatan Harapan (PKR)
P99	Ampang	Rodziah Ismail	Pakatan Harapan (PKR)
P106	Damansara	Gobind Singh Deo	Pakatan Harapan (DAP)
P107	Sungai Buloh	Ramanan Ramakrishnan	Pakatan Harapan (PKR)

List of Gombak district representatives in the State Legislative Assembly (Dewan Undangan Negeri)

Parliament	State	Seat Name	State Assemblyman	Party
P97	N13	Kuang	Mohd Rafiq Mohd Abdullah	Perikatan Nasional (BERSATU)
P97	N14	Rawang	Chua Wei Kiat	Pakatan Harapan (PKR)
P97	N15	Taman Templer	Anfaal Saari	Pakatan Harapan (AMANAH)
P98	N16	Sungai Tua	Amirudin Shari	Pakatan Harapan (PKR)
P98	N17	Gombak Setia	Muhammad Hilman Idham	Perikatan Nasional (BERSATU)
P98	N18	Hulu Kelang	Mohamed Azmin Ali	Perikatan Nasional (BERSATU)
P99	N19	Bukit Antarabangsa	Mohd Kamri Kamaruddin	Pakatan Harapan (PKR)
P99	N20	Lembah Jaya	Syed Ahmad Syed Abdul Rahman Alhadad	Pakatan Harapan (PKR)
P106	N37	Bukit Lanjan	Pua Pei Ling	Pakatan Harapan (PKR)
P107	N38	Paya Jaras	Ab Halim Tamuri	Perikatan Nasional (PAS)

== Transportation ==
=== By rail ===
- KTM Komuter (commuter rail services):
  - Batu Caves-Pulau Sebang Line:
    - Batu Caves
  - Tanjung Malim-Port Klang Line:
    - Kepong Sentral
    - Sungai Buloh
    - Kuang
    - Rawang
- KTM ETS (inter-city rail services):
  - Kepong Sentral
  - Sungai Buloh
  - Rawang
- Rapid KL (rapid transit):
  - LRT Kelana Jaya Line
    - Gombak
  - MRT Putrajaya Line
    - Sungai Buloh
    - Sri Damansara Barat

=== By car ===
The Gombak district is served by the following expressways:

- Federal Route 1 is the main thoroughfare going through Rawang town, Selayang and Batu Caves.
- Federal Route 68, also known as Jalan Gombak, runs through here before terminating in Bentong, Pahang.
- North-South Expressway Northern Route runs through Gombak district, providing exits to 114 Sungai Buloh North, 115 Rawang South and 116 Rawang.
- East Coast Expressway and Kuala Lumpur–Karak Expressway are the district's main gateway to the east coast states of Pahang, Terengganu and Kelantan.
- Kuala Lumpur-Kuala Selangor Expressway connects Ijok near Kuala Selangor to Templer's Park near Rawang with exits to 2505 Kundang, 2506 Kuang and 2508 Templer Park are runs through Gombak district.
- Guthrie Corridor Expressway also runs through Gombak district, providing exits to 115 Rawang South and 3501 Kuang.

=== Notable people ===
- Mohd Ikhmil Fawedz Mohd Hanif

== See also ==
- Districts of Malaysia
