= Genting Sempah–Genting Highlands Highway =

Road in Malaysia

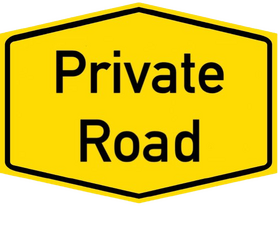
Genting Sempah–Genting Highlands Highway

Route information
- Length: 17.6 km (10.9 mi)
- Existed: 1965–present
- History: Access road completed in 1969, with further construction during 2001–2005

Major junctions
- Summit end: Genting Highlands
- Kuala Lumpur–Karak Expressway / FT 2 / AH141; FT 68 Federal Route 68; B66 Jalan Batang Kali–Genting Highlands; FT 433 Jalan Gunung Ulu Kali
- Downhill end: Genting Sempah

Location
- Country: Malaysia
- Primary destinations: Genting Highlands, Gohtong Jaya, Institut Aminuddin Baki, Genting Sempah, Batang Kali, Ulu Yam

Highway system
- Highways in Malaysia; Expressways; Federal; State

The Genting Sempah–Genting Highlands Highway (also called Genting Highway) is the main highway from Genting Sempah to Genting Highlands, Malaysia, a mountain resort and entertainment park. This is a private highway owned by Genting Berhad. The speed limit of the highway is 50 km/h (31 mph).

== Route background ==
The Genting Sempah–Genting Highlands Highway begins at the downhill Genting Sempah near EXIT 803 on E8 Kuala Lumpur–Karak Expressway (kilometre 17.6). Its terminus (kilometre zero) is at Genting Highlands summit. Climbing the Titiwangsa Range around 600 m (2,000 ft) at Genting Sempah to Genting Highlands with an altitude of 1,600 m (5,200 ft) above sea level, can resulting a steep road gradient, ranging between 10% and 16%, with some hit 12%. Road sections also configured as a dual carriageway (2+2).

== History ==
The Genting Sempah–Genting Highlands Highway used to be a private highway owned by Genting Highlands Resort. Construction of the access road to Genting Highlands began on 18 August 1965 and took four years to complete from Genting Sempah to Mount Ulu Kali's peak. The access road finally opened on 31 March 1969 in conjunction with the official laying of the foundation stone for the Genting Hotel (the then Highlands Hotel) by the then-Prime Minister Tunku Abdul Rahman Putra Al-Haj. In 2001, a new bypass Chin Swee Bypass was designed as a downhill route from the summit to the downhill Chin Swee Caves Temple was constructed and completed in 2005. The construction of the new bypass was regarded as one of the most astonishing engineering projects in Malaysia.

In 2021 and 2022, Genting Sempah was closed due to landslides caused by heavy rains that were exacerbated by climate change.

=== Notable events ===
- 18 August 1965 – Construction of the access road to Genting Highlands began.
- 31 March 1969 – The access road to Genting Highlands was opened.
- 30 June 1995 – 20 people were killed in a landslide at the Genting Highlands slip road near the Kuala Lumpur–Karak Highway.
- 16 July 1996 – A bus, ferrying a group of factory workers and their families on a holiday excursion, plunged into a 120-metre-deep ravine at km 1 near the Genting Highlands Resort, killing 17 of them. Six were children.
- 5 June 2004 – A retired businessman was killed when the bus he was skidded overturned and crashed at km 16 near Sri Layang roundabout.
- 31 March 2005 – A bus negotiating the sharp corner at km 18 at Gohtong Jaya roundabout skidded, hit the divider and landed on its side while coming down Genting Highlands. Fifteen passengers were injured.
- 13 April 2006 – A landslide occurred at 11 p.m. at km 3.8. The landslide at the new Chin Swee Bypass to Genting Highlands two days ago caused soil and boulders to cover the road, making it inaccessible to traffic. No one was apparently hurt.
- 22 September 2009 – Genting Malaysia Berhad has announced that soil erosion occurred at km 3.3 of a downhill road at the Genting Highlands Resort at 3.20 am. No one was apparently hurt.
- 29 October 2010 – Seven people were killed and more than 20 injured when the bus they were travelling in crashed at the slip roads for the Kuala Lumpur–Karak Expressway near Genting Sempah.
- 21 October 2011 – A man suffered light injuries when a landslide hit the front of his car at km 13.9 near Genting Highlands
- 21 August 2013 – At least 37 people were killed and 16 others injured when the bus carrying 53 passengers crashed into ravine at Km 3.5 of the Genting Sempah–Genting Highlands Highway near Chin Swee Caves Temple, Genting Highlands, Pahang. It was one of the worst road disasters in Malaysian history.
- 18 November 2014 – A landslide, caused by heavy rain, forced the closure of km 4.2 heading towards Genting Highlands.

== Features ==
=== Dangerous curves ===
At least six spots along the 18 km road leading down from Genting Highlands have recorded horrific accident area involving buses and other heavy vehicles since 1989. 10% steep gradients, sharp bends and less-than-ideal road conditions can make it difficult for heavy vehicles to manoeuvre, and odds of losing control, skidding off the road and crashing, are high.

=== Separated one-way roads ===
The one-way road (formerly original dual-carriageway highway) from Chin Swee Temple was constructed as a climbing route to the summit. The other one-way road from the summit was designed as a downhill route to Chin Swee Temple.

=== Emergency escape ramp ===
Emergency escape ramps are also provided, especially on the one way downhill Genting Sempah bound lanes. An emergency escape ramp enables vehicles that are having braking problems to stop safely. It is typically a long, sand or gravel-filled lane adjacent to a road with a steep grade, and is designed to accommodate large, heavy vehicles. The deep gravel allows the heavy vehicle's momentum to be dissipated in a controlled and relatively harmless way, allowing the operator to stop it safely.

=== Viaducts at Chin Swee Bypass ===
Viaducts at the downhill road of Chin Swee Bypass leading Genting Sempah bound.

=== Le Tour de Langkawi ===
Genting Highlands serve as the finish point of a stage in the Tour de Langkawi cycling race. It is one of the longest (30 km) climbs featured in a cycling event.

=== Kilometre and Hectormetre markers ===
Kilometer and Hectormetre markers are placed along the road. It can be used for reporting accident locations.

== Junction lists ==
The entire route is located in Bentong District, Pahang.

Legend:

- I/C - Interchange, I/S - Intersection, RSA - Rest and service area, OBR - Overhead bridge restaurant, R/R - Restaurant and rest plaza, L/B - Layby, V/P - Vista point, TN - tunnel, T/P - Toll plaza, BR - Bridge
- C - Cloverleaf, S - Stack, T-A - Trumpet-A, T-B - Trumpet-B, DT - Directional-T/Y, SDT - Semi-Directional-T/Y, P-Y - Partial-Y, D - Diamond, P-C - Partial cloverleaf, D-D - Diverging diamond, D-R - Direct ramp

=== Original route ===
Location	km	mi	Exit	Name	Destinations	Notes
Genting Sempah			1	Genting Sempah; Genting Sempah A Roundabout; 600m above sea level	Kuala Lumpur–Karak Expressway / FT 2 / AH141 – Kuala Lumpur, Gombak, Ipoh, Klang, Ulu Klang, Seremban	Interchange; To Kuala Lumpur only
Genting Sempah			2	Genting Sempah; Genting Sempah B I/C; 648m above sea level	FT 68 Malaysia Federal Route 68 – Bukit Tinggi, Janda Baik, Gombak, Genting Sempah RSA Kuala Lumpur–Karak Expressway / FT 2 / AH141 – Bentong, Raub, Gua Musang, Kota Bharu, Kuantan, Kuala Terengganu	Interchange; Westbound only
Genting Sempah			Police post 1; 684m above sea level			
Gohtong Jaya			–	Hydrophonic farm 797m above sea level		Genting Sempah bound
Gohtong Jaya			–	Roundabout; 956m above sea level		Roundabout; Genting Sempah bound
Gohtong Jaya			Vista Point -- m above sea level			
Gohtong Jaya			–	U-Turn; 861m above sea level	U-Turn	
Gohtong Jaya			3	Gohtong Jaya South I/C; 870m above sea level	Gohtong Jaya; Town Centre; Goh Tong's Villa (Lim Goh Tong's private residence); Genting Skyway cable car stations	Interchange with one ramp underpass to Gohtong Jaya from Genting Highlands
Gohtong Jaya			–	U-Turn; 861m above sea level	U-Turn	
Gohtong Jaya			–	Genting Permai Resort; 888m above sea level	Genting Permai Resort – Highlands International Boarding	From Genting Highlands
Gohtong Jaya	18.0	11.2	4	Gohtong Jaya Roundabout; 925m above sea level	B66 Jalan Batang Kali–Genting Highlands – Batang Kali, Ulu Yam, Ipoh, Genting Skyway cable car stations Jalan Sri Layang – Institut Aminuddin Baki, Sekolah Kebangsaan Sri Layang	Roundabout
Genting Highlands	17.9	11.1	Genting Highlands main entrance Police post 2; 930m above sea level			
Genting Highlands			–	Gohtong Memorial Park; 966m above sea level	Gohtong Memorial Park – Lim Goh Tong's grave	
Genting Highlands	16.0	9.9	-- m above sea level			
Genting Highlands	15.3	9.5	5	Awana Roundabout; 1,045m above sea level	Awana Skyway cable car stations, Genting Highlands Premium Outlets V, Mohamed Noah Foundation Mosque, Awana Genting Highlands Golf & Country Resort	Roundabout
Genting Highlands	12.9	8.0	–	UPM Field Station; 1,227m above sea level		Genting Sempah bound
Genting Highlands			Vista Point (Genting Sempah bound) -- m above sea level			
Genting Highlands			–	Chin Swee Caves Temple Separation; 1,275m above sea level	Genting Highlands Summit Bound – Genting Highlands (One-way Genting Highlands bound)	One-way separated carriageway Genting Sempah bound
1.000 mi = 1.609 km; 1.000 km = 0.621 mi: Incomplete access

=== Genting Highlands Climbing Route ===
(Climbing route, One-way Genting Highlands bound)

Location	km	mi	Exit	Name	Destinations	Notes
Genting Highlands			Vista Point -- m above sea level Start of the one-way bound			
Genting Highlands			6A	Chin Swee Caves Temple Exit; 1,446m above sea level	Chin Swee Caves Temple – Lim Goh Tong's statue, Chin Swee Temple's Awana Skyway cable car stations V	RIRO exit
Genting Highlands			Vista Point -- m above sea level			
Genting Highlands			–	Cradle Rock -- m above sea level	Cradle Rock V	
Genting Highlands			–	Heliport; 1,485m above sea level	Heliport – Open car park	
Genting Highlands	1.0	0.62	Vista Point -- m above sea level			
Genting Highlands			–	Ria Apartments; 1,671m above sea level	Ria Apartments	
Genting Highlands			–	Genting Highlands police stations 1,708m above sea level	Genting Highlands police stations	
Genting Highlands	0.1	0.062	–	Genting Highlands; Genting Highlands Summit; Kayangan Apartments I/S; 1,728m above sea level	Genting Highlands Summit – Kayangan Apartments, Genting Highlands fire stations, Genting Highlands staff quarters	End of the one-way bound Junctions
Genting Highlands	0.0	0.0	–	Genting Highlands; Genting Highlands Summit; 1,760m above sea level	Genting Highlands – Genting Grand, First World Hotel, Maxims Hotel, Resort World Hotel, Theme Park Hotel, Maxims Hotel, Crockfords Hotel, First World Plaza, Sky Avenue Mall, Skytropolis Funland, Casino de Genting, SkyCasino, Genting Highlands International Convention Centre, Genting International Showroom, 20th Century Fox World	
1.000 mi = 1.609 km; 1.000 km = 0.621 mi

=== Chin Swee Bypass ===
(Downhill route, One-way Genting Sempah bound)

Location	km	mi	Exit	Name	Destinations	Notes
Genting Highlands	0.0	0.0	–	Genting Highlands; Genting Highlands Summit; 1,760m above sea level		
Genting Highlands			Start of the one-way bound -- m above sea level			
Genting Highlands			Petron L/B; 1,682m above sea level			
Genting Highlands			–	Pelangi Hotel one way 1,679m above sea level	Pelangi Hotel – Genting Highlands Hotel, Casino de Genting, Genting Highlands International Convention Centre, First World Plaza, First World Hotel, Genting Theme Park, 20th Century Fox World	One way directional Y junctions
Genting Highlands			Start/End of the single carriageway -- m above sea level			
Genting Highlands			–	Heliport -- m above sea level	Heliport – Open car park	
Genting Highlands			TNB substation 1,656m above sea level			
Genting Highlands			Start/End of the single carriageway 1,650m above sea level			
Genting Highlands	1.0	0.62	7	Mushroom Park Roundabout; 1,652m above sea level	FT 433 Jalan Gunung Ulu Kali – Gunung Ulu Kali, Mushroom Park, Batik Centre	Roundabout
Genting Highlands	1.6	0.99	Emergency escape ramp 1,634m above sea level			
Genting Highlands			Viaduct -- m above sea level			
Genting Highlands			Emergency escape ramp 1,606m above sea level			
Genting Highlands			6B	Chin Swee Caves Temple Exit; 1,445m above sea level	Chin Swee Caves Temple – Lim Goh Tong's statue, Chin Swee Temple's Awana Skyway cable car stations V	RIRO exit
Genting Highlands			Viaduct -- m above sea level			
Genting Highlands	3.4	2.1	Emergency escape ramp 1,296m above sea level			
Genting Highlands	4.0	2.5	Viaduct -- m above sea level			
Genting Highlands			–	Chin Swee Caves Temple Separation; 1,282m above sea level	Continued to the original route	End of the one-way bound One-way separated carriageway
1.000 mi = 1.609 km; 1.000 km = 0.621 mi
