= Malaysia Federal Route 68 =

Road in Malaysia

Federal Route 68
- Jalan Gombak

Route information
- Maintained by Malaysian Public Works Department
- Length: 59.89 km (37.21 mi)
- Existed: 1915–present

Major junctions
- West end: Setapak, Kuala Lumpur
- FT 2 Genting Klang–Pahang Highway; Duta–Ulu Klang Expressway; FT 2 Jalan Kampung Bandar Dalam; B22 Jalan Batu Caves Kuala Lumpur–Karak Expressway / FT 2 / AH141; B38 Jalan Sungai Pusu; Genting Sempah–Genting Highlands Highway; C7 Jalan Janda Baik; FT 121 Jalan Sambung Kuala Lumpur/Karak–Bentong; FT 8 Federal Route 8
- East end: Ketari near Bentong, Pahang

Location
- Country: Malaysia
- Primary destinations: Padang Balang, Gombak, Genting Sempah, Janda Baik, Bukit Tinggi

Highway system
- Highways in Malaysia; Expressways; Federal; State

Federal Route 68, also known as Jalan Gombak or Jalan Karak Lama, is a federal road in Malaysia that links the city of Kuala Lumpur to Bentong, Pahang. Before Kuala Lumpur–Karak Expressway E8/FT2 was built, the road was used to be a part of Kuala Lumpur–Kuantan Road FT2; however, due to its sharp corners, narrow roadway and lack of safety features, a replacement highway known as the Kuala Lumpur–Karak Highway FT2 (now Kuala Lumpur–Karak Expressway E8/FT2) was built, causing the former Kuala Lumpur–Bentong section to be re-gazetted as the Federal Route 68.

== Route background ==
Jalan Gombak begins at Setapak Interchange, where it intersects with Jalan Pahang FT2 and Jalan Genting Klang. Jalan Gombak still holds the FT2 designation until Kampung Bandar Dalam Intersection, where the FT2 route is detoured to Jalan Kampung Bandar Dalam FT2 while Jalan Gombak route number changes to FT68.

The section from its beginning at Setapak Interchange to Mile 8 Intersection is a dual-carriageway with the speed limit of 60 km/h. After Mile 8 Intersection, the FT68 becomes a single-carriageway road but retains the 60 km/h speed limit due to its narrower condition. After Kampung Sungai Rumput, the Jalan Gombak FT68 becomes more winding, causing the speed limit to be reduced to 50 km/h. At that point, Jalan Gombak FT68 begins ascending the Titiwangsa Range until the Selangor–Pahang state border where it joins Genting Sempah–Genting Highlands Highway and overlaps it until the Genting Sempah Roundabout that links the FT68 road with the Kuala Lumpur–Karak Expressway E8/FT2.

From Genting Sempah, Jalan Gombak FT68 descends the Titiwangsa Range, passing the town of Bukit Tinggi along the way. 7 km before the road ends, the FT68 was linked to the Kuala Lumpur–Karak Expressway E8/FT2 for the last time via a short 400-m spur road. Jalan Gombak FT68 ends at Ketari Intersection near Bentong, where it is linked to the Federal Route 8.

== History ==
Jalan Gombak FT68 used to be a part of the Kuala Lumpur–Kuantan Road FT2. It was constructed in 1915. However, the road's very sharp corners, deep ravines, narrow roadway and lack of safety features made it dangerous. Therefore, in the 1970s, a replacement segment for the narrow and winding Jalan Gombak from Kuala Lumpur to Karak was constructed. The replacement section was known as the Kuala Lumpur–Karak Highway FT2, featuring the 914.4-m Genting Sempah Tunnel. The 75.2-km toll highway was constructed at the cost of RM136.4 million and was opened to traffic on 7 January 1978. As a result, the old Jalan Gombak was re-gazetted as the Federal Route 68.

The Kuala Lumpur–Karak Highway FT2 was then upgraded to a full controlled-access expressway in 1994 and was completed four years later. However, unlike the Kuala Lumpur–Seremban Expressway E37/E2 project where the old Federal Route 1 section from Kuala Lumpur to Seremban was rehabilitated as part of the project, no such rehabilitation was done towards Jalan Gombak FT68 during the Kuala Lumpur–Karak Expressway E8/FT2 upgrading project. As a result, very few road users are willing to use the FT68 road due to its dangerous nature, even when the Kuala Lumpur–Karak Expressway E8/FT2 becomes badly congested during festive seasons.

The section of Jalan Gombak FT68 from Taman Ibu Kota intersection to Mile 8 Gombak intersection and Jalan Sungai Pusu B38 up to the entrance of the International Islamic University Malaysia (IIUM) Gombak were upgraded to a dual-carriageway as an Eighth Malaysia Plan (RMK-8) project to provide better access to the university from Kuala Lumpur. The upgrading works began on 1 November 2001 and were completed on 18 August 2005.

== Junction lists ==
Legend:

- I/C - Interchange, I/S - Intersection, RSA - Rest and service area, OBR - Overhead bridge restaurant, R/R - Restaurant and rest plaza, L/B - Layby, V/P - Vista point, TN - tunnel, T/P - Toll plaza, BR - Bridge
- C - Cloverleaf, S - Stack, T-A - Trumpet-A, T-B - Trumpet-B, DT - Directional-T/Y, SDT - Semi-Directional-T/Y, P-Y - Partial-Y, D - Diamond, P-C - Partial cloverleaf, D-D - Diverging diamond, D-R - Direct ramp

State/territory	District	Location	km	mi	Name	Destinations	Notes
Kuala Lumpur	N/A	Setapak	0.0	0.0	Setapak	FT 2 Genting Klang–Pahang Highway – Klang Gates, Ulu Klang, Sentul, City Centre, Seremban, Petaling Jaya	Trumpet interchange Western terminus of concurrency with FT2.
Kuala Lumpur	N/A	Setapak			Jalan Gombak-DUKE I/C	Duta–Ulu Klang Expressway (Sentul Pasar–Jalan Gombak Link) / AH141 – Duta–Sentul Pasar–Ulu Klang Link (Main Link), Jalan Sultan Yahya Petra (Jalan Semarak), Setiawangsa, Ulu Klang, Ampang, City Centre, Kepong, Ipoh, Petaling Jaya	Trumpet interchange
Kuala Lumpur	N/A	Setapak			Wisma Ekovest		
Kuala Lumpur	N/A	Setapak			Taman P Ramlee (Taman Forlong)	Jalan 1/50 – Taman P Ramlee (Taman Forlong), P. Ramlee Memorial	T-junctions
Kuala Lumpur	N/A	Setapak			Jalan Kampung Bandar Dalam; Kampung Padang Balang	FT 2 Jalan Kampung Bandar Dalam – Sentul, Batu Caves, Kuantan	T-junctions; Eastern terminus of concurrency with FT2.
Kuala Lumpur	N/A	Gombak (Kuala Lumpur side)			Pasar Besar Gombak (Wet Market)		
Kuala Lumpur	N/A	Gombak (Kuala Lumpur side)	8.0	5.0	Zaid bin Haritsah Mosque		
Kuala Lumpur	N/A	Gombak (Kuala Lumpur side)			Taman Ibukota	Jalan Taman Ibukota – Taman Ibukota, Wangsa Maju	T-junctions
Selangor	Gombak	Gombak (Selangor side)			Taman Gombak Jaya		
Selangor	Gombak	Gombak (Selangor side)			Masjid As Syakirin, Gombak		
Selangor	Gombak	Gombak (Selangor side)			Taman Kamariah		
Selangor	Gombak	Gombak (Selangor side)			Jalan Dewan	Jalan Dewan – Taman Gombak Setia, Taman Melati	T-junctions
Selangor	Gombak	Gombak (Selangor side)			Masjid Lama Gombak		
Selangor	Gombak	Gombak (Selangor side)			Jalan Batu Caves	B22 Jalan Batu Caves – Batu Caves, Kuantan	Half-diamond interchange
Selangor	Gombak	Gombak (Selangor side)			Bentong bound Maximum height limit 4.5 m		
Selangor	Gombak	Gombak (Selangor side)			Kampung Sungai Pusu		
Selangor	Gombak	Gombak (Selangor side)			Kampung Sungai Chinchin		
Selangor	Gombak	Gombak (Selangor side)			Setapak bound Maximum height limit 4.5 m		
Selangor	Gombak	Gombak North			Gombak North	B38 Jalan Sungai Pusu – Kampung Sungai Pusu, International Islamic University Malaysia (IIUM) Gombak Kuala Lumpur–Karak Expressway / FT 2 / AH141 – Kuala Lumpur, Ampang	T-junctions
Selangor	Gombak	Gombak North			Gombak North		
Selangor	Gombak	Gombak North			Sungai Chinchin bridge		
Selangor	Gombak	Gombak North			Gombak North		
Selangor	Gombak	Gombak North			Taman Permai Jaya		
Selangor	Gombak	Gombak North			Kampung Sungai Salak		
Selangor	Gombak	Gombak North			Mimaland	Mimaland	Abandoned T-junctions
Selangor	Gombak	Gombak North			Kampung Batu Sebelas		
Selangor	Gombak	Gombak North			Kampung Batu Dua Belas Gombak		
Selangor	Gombak	Gombak North			Orang Asli Museum	Orang Asli Museum	
Selangor	Gombak	Gombak North			Kampung Sungai Rumput		
Selangor	Gombak	Gombak North			Taman Rimba Klasik Sendayu; 650m above sea level	Taman Rimba Klasik Sendayu	
Selangor–Pahang border					648m above sea level		
Pahang	Bentong	Genting Sempah			Genting Sempah; 648m above sea level	Genting Sempah–Genting Highlands Highway – Genting Highlands, Gohtong Jaya, Institut Aminuddin Baki	
Pahang	Bentong	Genting Sempah			Kampung Genting Sempah; 647m above sea level	Kampung Genting Sempah – Remember 126 Chinese Seafood Restaurant V	
Pahang	Bentong	Genting Sempah			ANIH Berhad Genting Sempah Tunnel Monitoring and Maintenance Centre; 645m above sea level	ANIH Berhad Genting Sempah Tunnel Monitoring and Maintenance Centre	Authorized personnel only
Pahang	Bentong	Genting Sempah			Genting Sempah; 600 m above sea level	Kuala Lumpur–Karak Expressway / FT 2 / AH141 – Kuala Lumpur, Gombak, Ipoh, Seremban, Johor Bahru, Bukit Tinggi, Bentong, Kuantan, Kuala Terengganu	Roundabout
Pahang	Bentong	Genting Sempah			MTD Prime section maintenances office 600m above sea level		Authorized personnel only
Pahang	Bentong	Genting Sempah			Taman Rimba; 600m above sea level		
Pahang	Bentong	Genting Sempah			Genting Sempah RSA; 600m above sea level	Genting Sempah RSA – Petronas McDonald's	T-junctions
Pahang	Bentong	Bukit Tinggi			Kampung Janda Baik; 598m above sea level	C7 Jalan Janda Baik – Kampung Janda Baik	T-junctions
Pahang	Bentong	Bukit Tinggi			Kampung Bukit Tinggi; 590m above sea level	Kampung Bukit Tinggi	T-junctions
Pahang	Bentong	Bukit Tinggi			Kampung Sungai Tanglir; 585m above sea level		
Pahang	Bentong	Bentong			Bentong Hot Springs	Bentong Hot Springs	
Pahang	Bentong	Bentong			Kampung Lentang		
Pahang	Bentong	Bentong			Kampung Temiang		
Pahang	Bentong	Bentong			Kampung Lubuk Mandi		
Pahang	Bentong	Bentong			Kampung Rasia		
Pahang	Bentong	Bentong			Jalan Sambung Kuala Lumpur/Karak–Bentong	FT 121 Jalan Sambung Kuala Lumpur/Karak–Bentong Kuala Lumpur–Karak Expressway / FT 2 / AH141 – Karak, Kuantan, Kuala Terengganu	T-junctions
Pahang	Bentong	Bentong			Kampung Sirai		
Pahang	Bentong	Bentong			Kampung Tambai		
Pahang	Bentong	Bentong			Taman Kolej		
Pahang	Bentong	Bentong			Taman Wangi		
Pahang	Bentong	Bentong			Taman Orkid		
Pahang	Bentong	Bentong			Taman Kilat		
Pahang	Bentong	Bentong			Taman Sri Tanjung		
Pahang	Bentong	Bentong			Taman Ketari		
Pahang	Bentong	Bentong	59.8	37.2	Bentong; Ketari	FT 8 Malaysia Federal Route 8 – Bentong, Raub, Kuala Lipis, Gua Musang, Kota Bharu Kuala Lumpur–Karak Expressway / FT 2 / AH141 – Kuala Lumpur, Genting Highlands, Karak, Kuantan, Kuala Terengganu	Junctions
1.000 mi = 1.609 km; 1.000 km = 0.621 mi: Closed/former; Concurrency terminus; Incomplete access
