= Karak, Pahang =

Karak
- Town

Other transcription(s)
  - Jawi: کارق
  - Chinese: 加叻; Jiālè (Hanyu Pinyin)
  - Tamil: காராக் Kārāk (Transliteration)
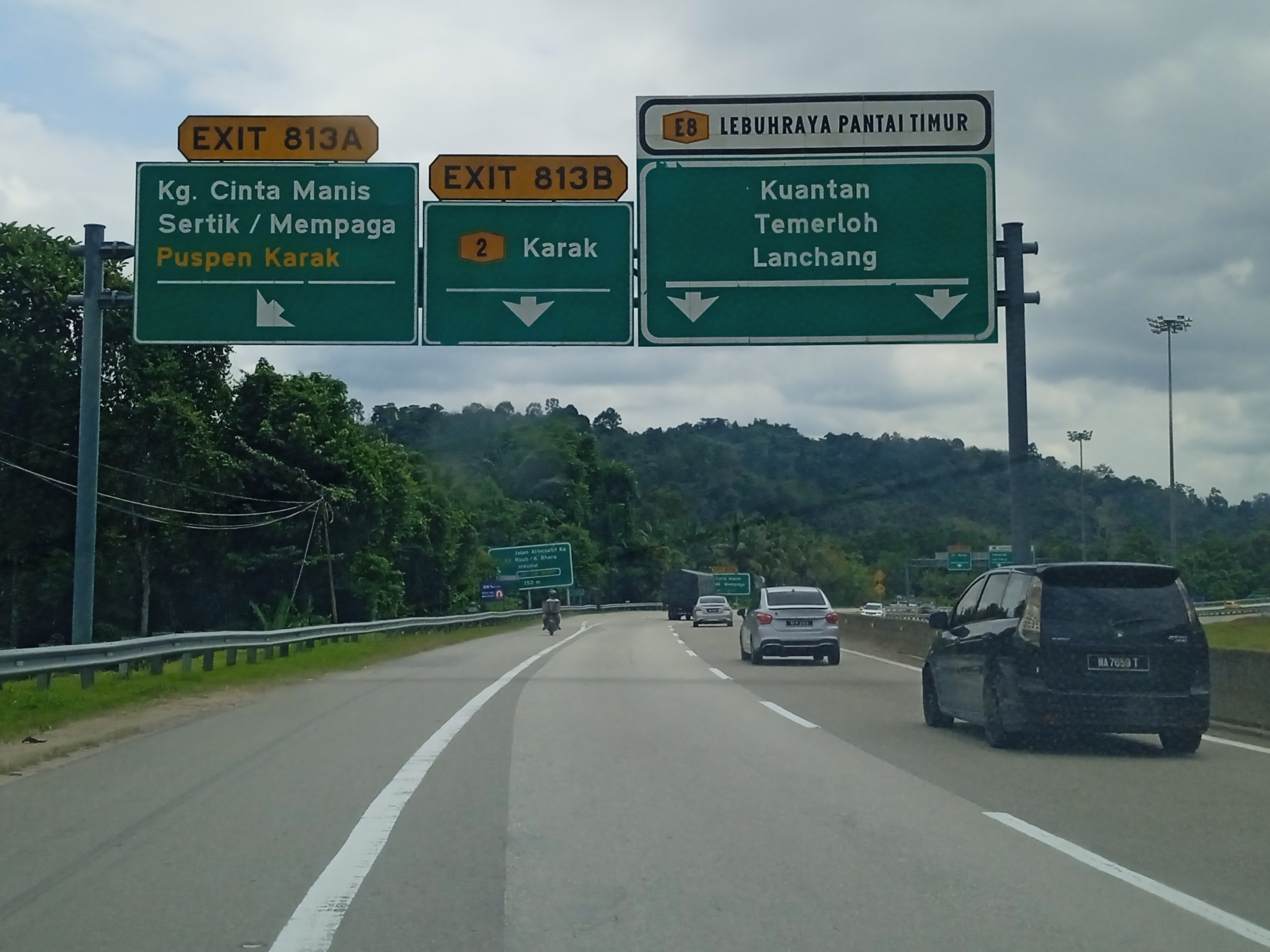
- Interactive map of Karak
- Karak in Pahang Karak (Malaysia) Karak (Southeast Asia)
- Coordinates: 3°24′55.44″N 102°01′59.88″E
- Country: Malaysia
- State: Pahang Darul Makmur
- District: Bentong District
- Federal seat: Bentong
- State seat: Sabai

Government
  - Type: Municipal council
  - Body: Bentong Municipal Council
  - Yang Dipertua: Dato' Hajah Aida Munira Binti Abdul Rafar
  - Member of Parliament: Young Syefura Othman
  - State Assembly Representative: V Arumugam
- Time zone: UTC+8 (MST)
- Postcode: 28600
- Telephone area code: +6-09231XXXX
- Vehicle registration: C
- Police: Karak Police Station
- Fire: Karak Fire and Rescue Station
- Website: www.mpbentong.gov.my/en

Karak is a small town in Bentong District, Pahang, Malaysia. Located at the foothills of Malaysia's Titiwangsa Mountain Range, it is well known as a rest town along the Federal Route 2 from Kuala Lumpur to Kuantan and lends its name to the Karak Highway, or the Kuala Lumpur-Karak Expressway linking it to the country's capital of Kuala Lumpur.

== Town ==
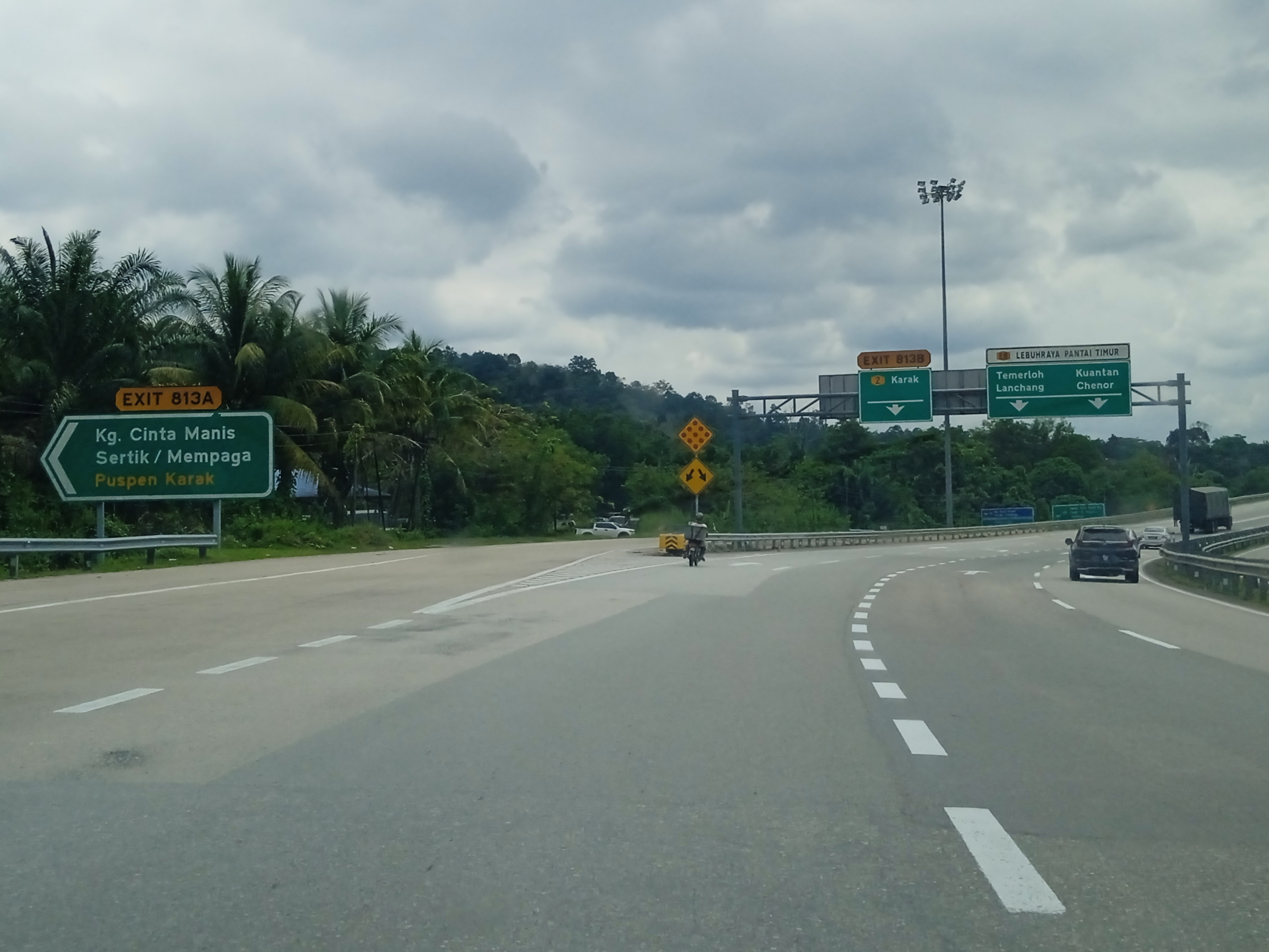
Karak Highway

The town of Karak and its outlying areas are located about 20 km southeast of the region's municipal capital of Bentong, at an elevation of 72 metres, with several outlying villages within the area's outskirts, including Kampung Cinta Manis, Kampung Jambu Rias, Kampung Karak Setia, Kampung Sungai Dua, and Taman Seri Bentong, all located within the town's sub-district outskirts.

The town's exact population is unknown, however a 2020 census by the Department of Statistics placed the Pahang state assembly seat of Sabai (which Karak is a part of) at 21,543 people.

Much of the town is located along the main Jalan Lama Bentong-Karak (Old Bentong-Karak road in English) trunk road coming from the municipal capital of Bentong, with a fork in the road on its eastern outskirts bound for the village of Lanchang in the east and the village of Telemong in the south.

The town can be accessed via Exit 813 just off the eastern end of the Karak Highway and the beginning of the East Coast Expressway East Coast Expressway, both managed by the highway concessionaire ANIH Berhad. The expressway runs parallel to the Federal Route 2 trunk road, which cuts through the town linking it to Gombak, Selangor.

Considered a small but growing town by modern Malaysian standards, Karak is home to several residential areas, a police station, a fire department, a government clinic, several national as well as Chinese and Tamil vernacular schools in and around the town, and two local community colleges: the Kolej Yayasan Pahang Advanced Skills and the Malaysian Technical Skills Academy.

It is also home to several places of worship, including three mosques: the Masjid Jamek Bandar Karak in the town's limits, as well as two more on the town's eastern outskirts, the Masjid Karak Setia and the Masjid Al-Ihsan Kg. Jambu Rias, the Karak Chinese Methodist Church, the Sri Bala Subramaniar Hindu temple, two Chinese temples, including a temple hall within the town's limits and the Ti Mu temple on the town's outskirts.

There are three petrol stations, two banks, a post office, and several commercial shoplots placed throughout the town. The shoplots include restaurants, vehicle workshops, convenience stores, mini-markets, and various other businesses.

== History ==
The area known as Karak is believed to have been named after the Karak River located on the outskirts of the town by travelers from Sumatra, Indonesia who settled there in ages past. It began to gain prominence during Malaya's British colonial era, as Pahang was one of the four states administered by British Residents under the federation of the Federated Malay States.

=== British colonial era ===
Foreign-run rubber plantations were then sited across Pahang, with the British-based Karak Rubber Company formed in 1907 acquiring 2,000 acres of forest area in the Bentong district, which was held on a lease from the Resident-General of the Federated Malay States. The company was first poised to develop the land by planting 1,000 acres with rubber over the next three years, with 100 acres already cleared, and the rest to follow suit.

Progress was slow at first, though the Karak estate's manager E. H. Bratt found while the soil was "very good", the only lacking was manpower. Up to early 1911, the estate had been employing Tamilian Indian and local Malay labourers, and had just begun to see new Chinese workers come in.

The estate first started to tap on their rubber trees in September 1912, with some 4,379 lbs of rubber harvested by the end of the year. The harvesting of the crop picked up over 1913, with 36,501 lbs of rubber produced, as a factory equipped with machinery was built and a motor lorry bought. Some 662 acres of the company's reserve land, deemed of no use to the company, was then surrendered to the government.

Rubber output in Karak grew immensely over the years with 247,091 lbs in 1917 up to 521,417 lbs in 1930 as it confirmed a total planted acreage of 1,173 acres by the end of 1935.

Roads linking the town to other population centers, such as one to Mentakab in 1924, were also built. In 1939, the town of Karak was listed as a "smaller commercial centre" with a population of about 300 people.

The town was also visited in January 1928 by Hugh Clifford, the Governor of the Straits Settlements and British High Commissioner in Malaya, where he served from 1927 until 1929, during a tour of Pahang over the new year. A former British Resident of Pahang from 1896 to 1900, he stopped in Karak on January 10 to have tea with the local Penghulu chief of the Sabai mukim (sub-district), and was escorted under a royal yellow umbrella upon his arrival. He then inspected the town's Malay School, before he was greeted by the manager of the Karak Rubber Estate and its labour force.

Mining activities were also prevalent in the area, with the Karak Tin Company sited next to the Bentong river, though the mine closed in 1957, the year of the country's independence.

=== The Malayan Emergency ===
In the years following the Second World War, the town and the area around it became a hotbed of communist activity perpetrated by pro-independence fighters of the Malayan National Liberation Army (MNLA), with the road from Bentong to Karak described as "at one time the most dangerous in the Federation".

Even prior to a state of emergency being declared in June 1948, police found a weapons cache near Karak in 1947, discovering 27 grenades, several firearms and cases of explosives after a three-hour search. The cache was believed to have come from a Royal Air Force drop for the Malayan Peoples' Anti-Japanese Army during the Japanese occupation of Malaya.

Soon after hostilities broke out in 1948, MNLA fighters (termed by the government as "bandits") began to emerge from the jungle, ambushing patrols by security forces. On May 25, 1949, they ambushed two trucks heading to Karak from the village of Manchis escorted by seven Nepali Gurkhas soldiers, killing one and wounding five others, before leaving behind the bodies of two Chinese. The two bodies were later identified as Kuomintang members from the village who were abducted from their house on May 24, tied up and later killed.

Two months later on July 3, the government imposed a strict curfew in 18 towns in Negeri Sembilan and Pahang including Karak, to last from 7.30pm to 5.30am every day, with all persons to remain indoors unless they had an official permit.

Passenger buses heading to and from Karak were also frequently attacked, and those that didn't escape were ordered to stop, were set on fire and their occupants robbed with their identity cards seized.

MNLA fighters also found their way into the town of Karak to carry out attacks. In one case on October 27, 1949, a hand grenade was thrown into a shop owned by Teh Eng Suan, a member of the Bentong Town Board and a leader of the local Chinese community in Bentong, exploding at the side of his desk. The blast killed three women instantly, and wounded three adults and four children, including Teh and his 10-year-old son. Police immediately screened the town and detained three suspects.

In another instance on June 19, 1950, fighters entered the town and robbed a shop there, and were about to burn down a bus but escaped when police quickly arrived.

The MNLA was also responsible for sabotaging telephone wires, destroying infrastructure, ambushing and killing local civilians An indigenous Orang Asli woman and her two children were also killed by Chinese bandits on May 16, while three people escaped with the woman's youngest son. At least two Europeans were also killed by fighters in the area.

Attacks on military convoys and security forces continued in the area. On June 19, 1950, two policemen were killed and three others were wounded in an ambush.

Security forces responded with raids, arresting suspected MNLA fighters and supporters.

In response to the fighting, locals from the town of Karak volunteered as auxiliary volunteer police forces to defend themselves from the MNLA. Most of the volunteers were Chinese. The 33 men formed three platoons of home guards. This blunted efforts by fighters to take over the area. About 80 indigenous Orang Asli were also resettled near the Karak police post after they were moved away from their original homes four miles from the town.

A Nepalese Gurkha soldier, Corporal Dhanbahadur Rai of the 1/10th Gurkha Rifles was responsible for leading his unit to kill seven MNLA fighters in the area over two months in 1951, and was awarded the Distinguished Conduct Medal for gallantry. Later on February 25, 1952, the Royal Air Force dropped 48 1,000-pound bombs on a group of 40 communists trapped in the hills next to Sungei Rolok near Karak by security forces, with authorities combing the area in the days after.

=== The Disappearance of Brigadier M. D. Erskine ===
During the Malayan Emergency, an Auster aircraft bound for Kuala Lumpur from Mentakab carrying Brigadier M. D. Erskine, Commander of the Second Guards Brigade and his pilot Captain John Churcher went missing near Karak It was last seen circling the area as if trying to land, and was believed to have crashed in the jungle.

Erskine, then aged 44, had served as a brigade major during the Dunkirk evacuation in France during the Second World War, and later commanded the first and second Battalions of the Scots Guards. He also served in North Africa and Italy, and received the Distinguished Service Order in May 1943 at the end of the African campaign.

Authorities then proceeded to search the countryside for a sign of the aircraft, which was believed to have made a forced landing due to stormy conditions and did not find the plane until nearly five years later on August 3, 1954 along with Erskine's service ribbons.

A foot patrol then came across some scattered wreckage and human bones, along with a few fragments of medal ribbon, determining that the victim was the missing Erskine.

=== Communist insurgency (Malaysia) ===
After the end of the Malayan Emergency in 1960, the MNLA began to operate again around Karak during the country's second insurgency in the 1970s, though fighting was lighter compared to the late 40s and 50s.

In 1974, security forces killed two fighters in clash in the Karak area, finding several firearms, ammunition and food supplies, with police claiming there was still communist activity in the area by late 1976.

In 1977, police and security forces hunting an MNLA leader known as Chai Kar Leong (nicknamed "Robin"), catching him and his wife near Karak in the Telemong Forest on April 2. Police then launched a series of operations codenamed Operation Kelong to flush out a communist unit that had been operating in the area.

They first arrested two communist fighters who identified as Ah Hon (nicknamed "Batman") and Tien Chen, who then agreed to work with police to persuade a band of 14 comrades in a Telemong jungle camp to surrender.

On May 14, a group of 29 police and military personnel entered the Telemong Forest with the two ex-communists entering the camp first to convince their comrades to give up. Their efforts were successful, and the next day, all the 14 surrendered and handed over their weapons, items and cash worth 177,000 ringgit before they were airlifted out by helicopter.

The successful operation prevented the communists in the area from moving to the country's south, as police launched two more operations codenamed Operation Kelong II and III to hunt for remaining fighters, including Chai's former deputy Pang Kuan.

After a number of missions in the area, two more communists were arrested by police in front of the Grand cinema in the nearby town of Mentakab on November 7 that year.

In 1978, police found that Pang Kuan had returned to Karak with seven fighters in January, and was even visited by Chong Chor, the commander of the Malayan Communist Party's 6th Assault Unit in Pahang, during the March–April period that year, who was there in an effort to increase the communist presence in the area.

Police then launched their fourth and last operation in Karak known as Operation Kelong IV, killing a fighter on April 17 and coming across a nearby camp capable of housing 20 to 30 people the next day. It was found to have been vacated for a period of six to eight months, though authorities found a weapons cache of 29 grenades, ammunition and explosive materials.

Patrols in the coming days also saw another two fighters shot dead by security forces in two separate firefights. Authorities suffered no casualties during Operation Kelong IV except for a policeman suffering after stepping on a jungle snare. The operation ended on May 25 after no more fighters were found in the area, with security forces arresting 18 MNLA fighters and killing another three.

=== On to Independence and after ===
The town began to see more development as the Emergency eased in much of the country, with the opening of a court in the town in 1953 to deal with crime, adding it to a list of seven courts in the state's western region at the time. A country club was launched a year later, and was opened by the-then Pahang Sultan Abu Bakar.

In 1955, the town saw an outbreak of swine fever. It caused the deaths of 120 pigs there. Authorities found that the pathogen was brought in by pigs smuggled in from Siam that were sold by black market dealers in the Bentong area. The disease spread to Mentakab, where 20 pigs died.

The years that followed Malaya's independence in 1957 saw steady development in and around the town, with the building of a cinema in 1961, two community halls, and a national school that could cater for 200 students in 1962. A government clinic with dental services was built in 1963, with one of seven Korean doctors under a three-year contract with the Malaysian government, arriving in Karak to work in a rural health centre in the area. Malaysia's then-Deputy Prime Minister Tun Abdul Razak visited the town in 1967 to open a $90,000 mosque. The country's education minister Khir Johari opened a secondary school in Karak in 1967, and thanked the Canadian government for providing $6 million in aid to build secondary schools in the state.

=== Kampung Baru Karak 2021 fire ===
The town suffered its worst fire in its history on 1 October 2021 when the conflagration tore through the Kampung Baru Karak housing area, destroying 53 houses and eight shops. The authorities believed that the blaze started in an empty barber shop that had "wiring issues", before it spread to burn down the brick-and-wooden buildings that were over 50 years old. There were no casualties reported. The incident made 162 people homeless.

== Politics ==
In the 1955 Malayan general election, Karak being under the Bentong district was included in the Semantan federal seat, which was won by Abdul Razak Hussein of the United Malays National Organisation(UMNO), beating Mohd Yassin Mohd Salleh of the Pan-Malaysian Islamic Party by a majority of 12,095 votes. Abdul Razak later became the country's first Deputy Prime Minister and later its second Prime Minister.

The Sabai state seat of the Pahang State Legislative Assembly was later created for the 1959 Malayan general election, and contested by UMNO's Abu Bakar Ahmad (b. 1922 - d. 1981) who beat independent candidate Leong Thee Cheok by a majority of 1,997 votes. Abu Bakar was the eldest son of Kampung Karak Setia's first village chief Ahmad Dollah and one of the founders of UMNO's Sabai branch that was formed in 1949. He stayed on as the Sabai assemblyman and became a Pahang State Executive Council member for two terms, but did not contest the 1974 elections after a traffic accident in Kuantan.

Karak also saw participation in local council elections that were contested by various locals until local polls were suspended by the country's federal government in 1965.

A branch of the Malayan Chinese Association was also formed in the town in 1962.

From 2018 to 2022, Karak's current Member of Parliament was Bentong's Wong Tack from the Democratic Action Party, while the Sabai state seat is currently held by Kamache Doray Rajoo, also from the DAP.

After the 2022 Malaysian general election, voters elected Young Syefura Othman from the Democratic Action Party as Bentong's new Member of Parliament, with the Sabai state seat held by V Arumugam of the Malaysian Indian Congress.

Members of the Legislative Assembly for Sabai
Assembly	Years	Name	Party
Constituency created
1st	1959-1964	Abu Bakar Ahmad	Alliance (UMNO)
2nd	1964-1969	Abu Bakar Ahmad	Alliance (UMNO)
	1969-1971	Assembly dissolved	
3rd	1971-1974	Abu Bakar Ahmad	Alliance (UMNO)
Constituency abolished
Constituency recreated
9th	1995-1999	R. Sinnathamby	BN (MIC)
10th	1999-2004	Davendran Murthy	BN (MIC)
11th	2004-2008	Davendran Murthy	BN (MIC)
12th	2008-2013	Davendran Murthy	BN (MIC)
13th	2013-2018	Kamache Doray Rajoo	DAP
14th	2018-2022	Kamache Doray Rajoo	DAP
15th	2022-	V Arumugam	BN (MIC)
