= Pahang State Route C7 =

Road in Malaysia

Pahang Route 7
- Jalan Janda Baik

Major junctions
- West end: Bukit Tinggi
- FT 68 Federal route 68
- East end: Janda Baik

Location
- Country: Malaysia

Highway system
- Highways in Malaysia; Expressways; Federal; State

Jalan Janda Baik (Pahang state route C7) is a major road in Pahang, Malaysia. The highway connects Bukit Tinggi with the hill‑village of Janda Baik and intersects with Federal Route 68, which links Kuala Lumpur to Bentong.

The area along the road is well-known for its pine forests, eco‑resorts, and hill‑residential developments popular among visitors from Kuala Lumpur.

== List of junctions ==
Km	Exit	Junctions	To	Remarks
		Bukit Tinggi	North; Kampung Bukit Tinggi West; FT 68 Gombak; FT 68 Genting Sempah; FT 68 Genting Highlands; East Coast Expressway FT 2 AH141 Kuala Lumpur–Karak Expressway; Kuala Lumpur; Kuantan East; FT 68 Bentong	Junctions
		Janda Baik gateway arch		
		Elektrisola		
		Conifer forest recreational park		
		Kampung Sum Sum	East; Jalan Sum Sum Hilir; Seri Pengantin Resort	T‑junctions
		Kebun Rimba		
		Tanarimba Janda Baik	Southwest; Jalan Tanahrimba; Tanarimba Janda Baik	T‑junctions
		Kampung Ceringin Hulu		
		Janda Baik	North; Jalan Sum Sum Hilir; Masjid Janda Baik; Janda Baik waterfalls D' Ark Resort	T‑junctions
		Kampung Bertam	Kampung Bertam; Kampung Cemperuh	
