= Malaysia Federal Route 121 =

Road in Malaysia

Federal Route 121
- Jalan Sambung Kuala Lumpur/Karak–Bentong

Route information
- Maintained by Malaysian Public Works Department
- Length: 0.40 km (0.25 mi; 1,300 ft)

Major junctions
- North end: Jalan Gombak
- FT 68 Federal Route 68 Kuala Lumpur–Karak Expressway / FT 2 / AH141
- South end: Bentong West Interchange

Location
- Country: Malaysia
- Primary destinations: Bentong, Raub, Kuala Lipis

Highway system
- Highways in Malaysia; Expressways; Federal; State

Jalan Sambung Kuala Lumpur/Karak–Bentong, Federal Route 121, is a continuous federal road in Pahang, Malaysia.

At most sections, the Federal Route 121 was built under the JKR R5 road standard, allowing the maximum speed limit of up to 90 km/h.

== Junction lists ==
The entire route is located in Bentong District, Pahang.

Legend:

- I/C - Interchange, I/S - Intersection, RSA - Rest and service area, OBR - Overhead bridge restaurant, R/R - Restaurant and rest plaza, L/B - Layby, V/P - Vista point, TN - tunnel, T/P - Toll plaza, BR - Bridge
- C - Cloverleaf, S - Stack, T-A - Trumpet-A, T-B - Trumpet-B, DT - Directional-T/Y, SDT - Semi-Directional-T/Y, P-Y - Partial-Y, D - Diamond, P-C - Partial cloverleaf, D-D - Diverging diamond, D-R - Direct ramp

Location	km	mi	Name	Destinations	Notes
Bentong			Jalan Gombak	FT 68 Malaysia Federal Route 68 – Gombak, Bukit Tinggi, Bentong, Raub, Kuala Lipis	T-junctions
Bentong			Sungai Benus bridge		
Bentong			Bentong West-KLKE	Kuala Lumpur–Karak Expressway / FT 2 / AH141 – Karak, Kuantan, Kuala Terengganu	LILO
1.000 mi = 1.609 km; 1.000 km = 0.621 mi: Incomplete access
