= Selangor State Route B38 =

Road in Malaysia

Selangor Route 38
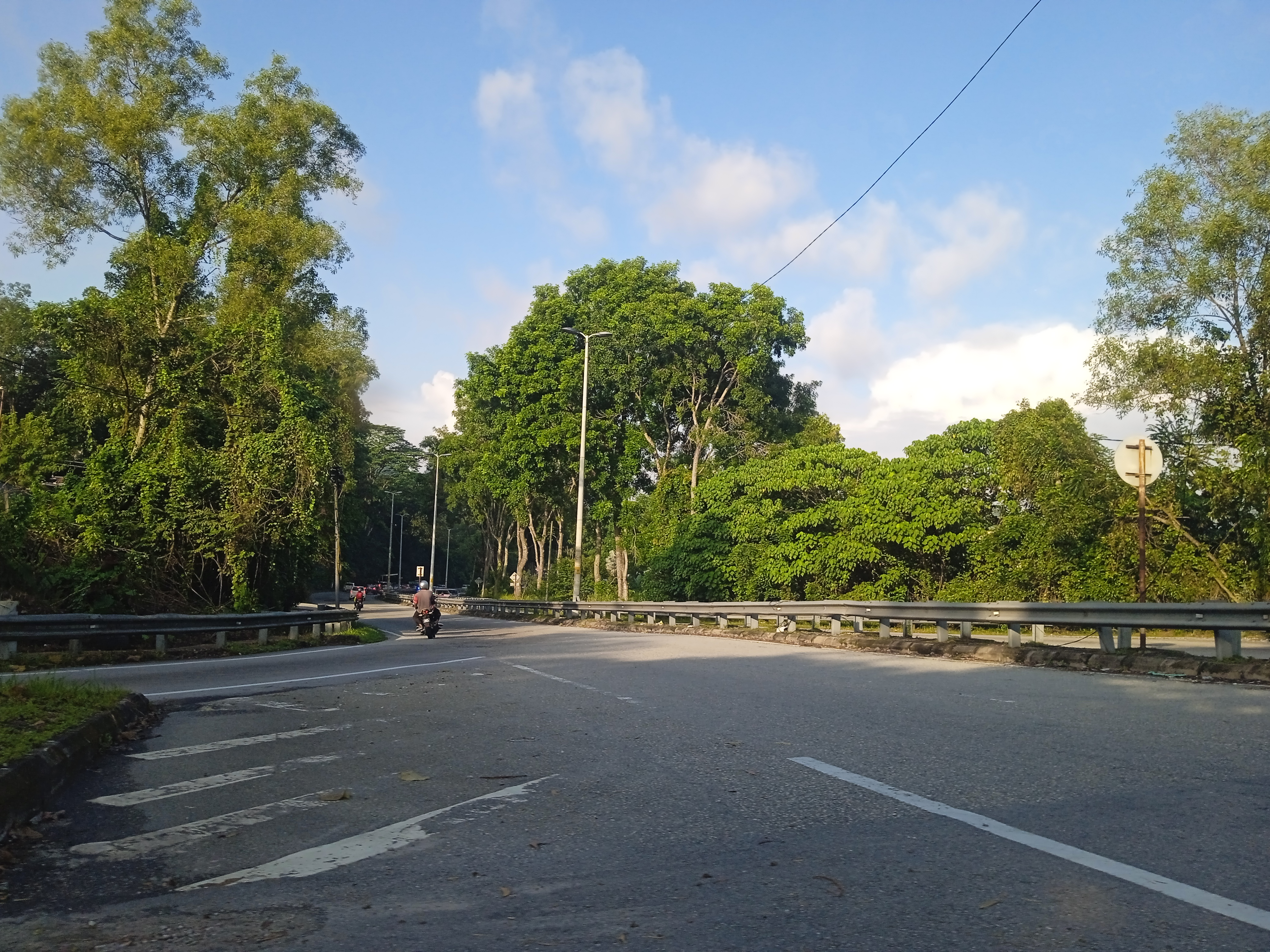

Major junctions
- West end: Gombak
- FT 68 Federal Route 68; East Coast Expressway FT 2 AH141 Kuala Lumpur–Karak Expressway
- East end: Kampung Sungai Pusu

Location
- Country: Malaysia
- Primary destinations: International Islamic University Malaysia (IIUM) Gombak

Highway system
- Highways in Malaysia; Expressways; Federal; State

Jalan Sungai Pusu (Selangor state route B38) is a major road in Klang Valley region, Selangor, Malaysia

== List of junctions ==
| Km | Exit | Junctions | To | Remarks |
|---|---|---|---|---|
| | | Gombak | Northeast; FT 68 Hulu Gombak; FT 68 Bentong; Orang Asli Museum Southwest; FT 68 Setapak; FT 68 Kuala Lumpur (Maximum height limit 4.5 m) | T-junctions |
| | | Sekolah Berasrama Penuh Integrasi (SBPI) Gombak | | |
| | | International Islamic School Kuala Lumpur | | |
| | | British-Malaysian Institute | | |
| | | Sekolah Menengah Islam Al-Amin Gombak | | |
| | | Sekolah Menengah Teknik (SMT) Gombak | | |
| | | Gombak North-Kuala Lumpur Karak Expressway | | T-junctions; No entry |
| | | International Islamic University Malaysia (IIUM) Gombak | International Islamic University Malaysia (IIUM); Main Campus; Sultan Ahmad Shah Mosque | T-junctions |
| | | Gombak North-Kuala Lumpur–Karak Expressway | Southwest; East Coast Expressway FT 2 AH141 Kuala Lumpur–Karak Expressway; Kuala Lumpur; Batu Caves; Kepong; Petaling Jaya; Ampang; Cheras; Shah Alam; Seremban; Kuala Lumpur International Airport (KLIA) | T-junctions |
| | | Kampung Sungai Pusu Muslim Cemetery | | |
| | | Kampung Sungai Pusu | Pusat Rawatan Islam Al-Hidayah | T-junctions |
