= Jalan Kampung Bandar Dalam =

Road in Malaysia

Federal Route 2
- Jalan Kampung Bandar Dalam

Route information
- Maintained by Malaysian Public Works Department

Major junctions
- West end: Sentul
- Jalan Sentul Pasar; Jalan Sentul Duta–Ulu Klang Expressway / FT 2 / AH141; FT 68 / FT 2 Federal Route 68
- East end: Gombak

Location
- Country: Malaysia
- Primary destinations: Batu Caves, Kuantan

Highway system
- Highways in Malaysia; Expressways; Federal; State

Jalan Kampung Bandar Dalam, Federal Route 2 is a single carriageway federal road in Kuala Lumpur, Malaysia. It is a hidden route to Kuantan via Kuala Lumpur–Karak Highway. It is also one of the roads that remain the original apperarance of Federal Route 2.

== Junction lists ==
The entire route is located in Kuala Lumpur.

Legend:

- I/C - Interchange, I/S - Intersection, RSA - Rest and service area, OBR - Overhead bridge restaurant, R/R - Restaurant and rest plaza, L/B - Layby, V/P - Vista point, TN - tunnel, T/P - Toll plaza, BR - Bridge
- C - Cloverleaf, S - Stack, T-A - Trumpet-A, T-B - Trumpet-B, DT - Directional-T/Y, SDT - Semi-Directional-T/Y, P-Y - Partial-Y, D - Diamond, P-C - Partial cloverleaf, D-D - Diverging diamond, D-R - Direct ramp

Location	km	mi	Name	Destinations	Notes
Sentul			Sentul	Jalan Sentul Pasar – Sentul Pasar, Batu; Jalan Sentul – Sentul, City Centre, Petaling Jaya	T-junctions
Sentul			Kampung Chubadak		
Sentul			Sungai Chubadak bridge		
Kampung Bandar Dalam			Bandar Dalam-DUKE I/C	Duta–Ulu Klang Expressway (Greenwood–Sentul Pasar Link (Karak Link)) / FT 2 / AH141 – Batu Caves, Genting Highlands, Kuantan, Seremban, KLCC, City Centre, Pahang Roundabout, Sentul, Ulu Klang, Ampang, Jalan Duta, Petaling Jaya, Ipoh	Diamond interchange
Kampung Bandar Dalam			Kampung Bandar Dalam		
Gombak			Sungai Gombak bridge		
Gombak			Gombak	FT 68 Malaysia Federal Route 68 – Bentong, Genting Highlands, Gombak town centre, Taman Ibukota, Setapak, City Centre	T-junctions
1.000 mi = 1.609 km; 1.000 km = 0.621 mi
