= 1990 Kuala Lumpur–Karak Highway crash =

Road incident in Malaysia

Coordinates: 3.27°N 101.65°E

1990 Kuala Lumpur–Karak Highway Crash

Details
- Date: 28 February 1990
- Location: Gombak, Selangor, Malaysia

Statistics
- Deaths: 17

The 1990 Kuala Lumpur–Karak Highway crash was a highway pile-up took place in Gombak District, Selangor, Malaysia on 28 February 1990. About 17 people were killed when the passenger bus collided with a tanker lorry, FRU riot police vehicles, a lorry, two taxis and six cars at kilometre 30.9 of the Kuala Lumpur–Karak Highway about 5 km from Genting Sempah Tunnel at Selangor–Pahang border. 11 FRU riot police personal were killed too. Many vehicles to and from Kuala Lumpur were trapped in a massive jams for five hours. This was the worst highway disaster in Malaysia since Kuala Lumpur–Karak Highway was opened to traffic in 1979.

== See also ==
- List of Royal Malaysian police officers killed in the line of duty
- List of road accidents
