= Jalan Gunung Ulu Kali =

Road in Malaysia

Coordinates: 40.81931°N 22.17761°E

Federal Route 433
- Jalan Gunung Ulu Kali

Route information
- Maintained by Malaysian Public Works Department
- Length: 3.22 km (2.00 mi)

Major junctions
- South end: Genting Highlands
- Genting Sempah-Genting Highlands Highway
- North end: Gunung Ulu Kali

Location
- Country: Malaysia

Highway system
- Highways in Malaysia; Expressways; Federal; State

Jalan Gunung Ulu Kali, Federal Route 433 is a federal road in Genting Highlands, Pahang, Malaysia.

The Kilometre Zero is located at Mushroom Park roundabout.

At most sections, the Federal Route 433 was built under the road standard, with a speed limit of 90 km/h.

== List of junctions ==
Km	Exit	Junctions	To	Remarks
FT 433; 0		Genting Highlands; Mushroom Park roundabout	Genting Sempah-Genting Highlands Highway Summit; Genting Highlands Hotel; Casino de Genting; Genting Highlands International Convention Centre; First World Plaza; First World Hotel; Genting Theme Park Genting Sempah Bound (Downhill Route); Chin Swee Bypass; Genting Sempah; Kuala Lumpur; Chin Swee Temple	Roundabout
		Mushroom Park		
		Batik Centre		
FT 433; 3				
3.2		Gunung Ulu Kali; 1,772m above sea level	Gunung Ulu Kali; Microwave stations	
