= Janda Baik =

Village in Pahang, Malaysia

Janda Baik Jando Baék
- Village

Other transcription(s)
  - Jawi: جندا باءيق
  - Chinese: 贞德拜 (Simplified) 贞德拜 (Traditional)
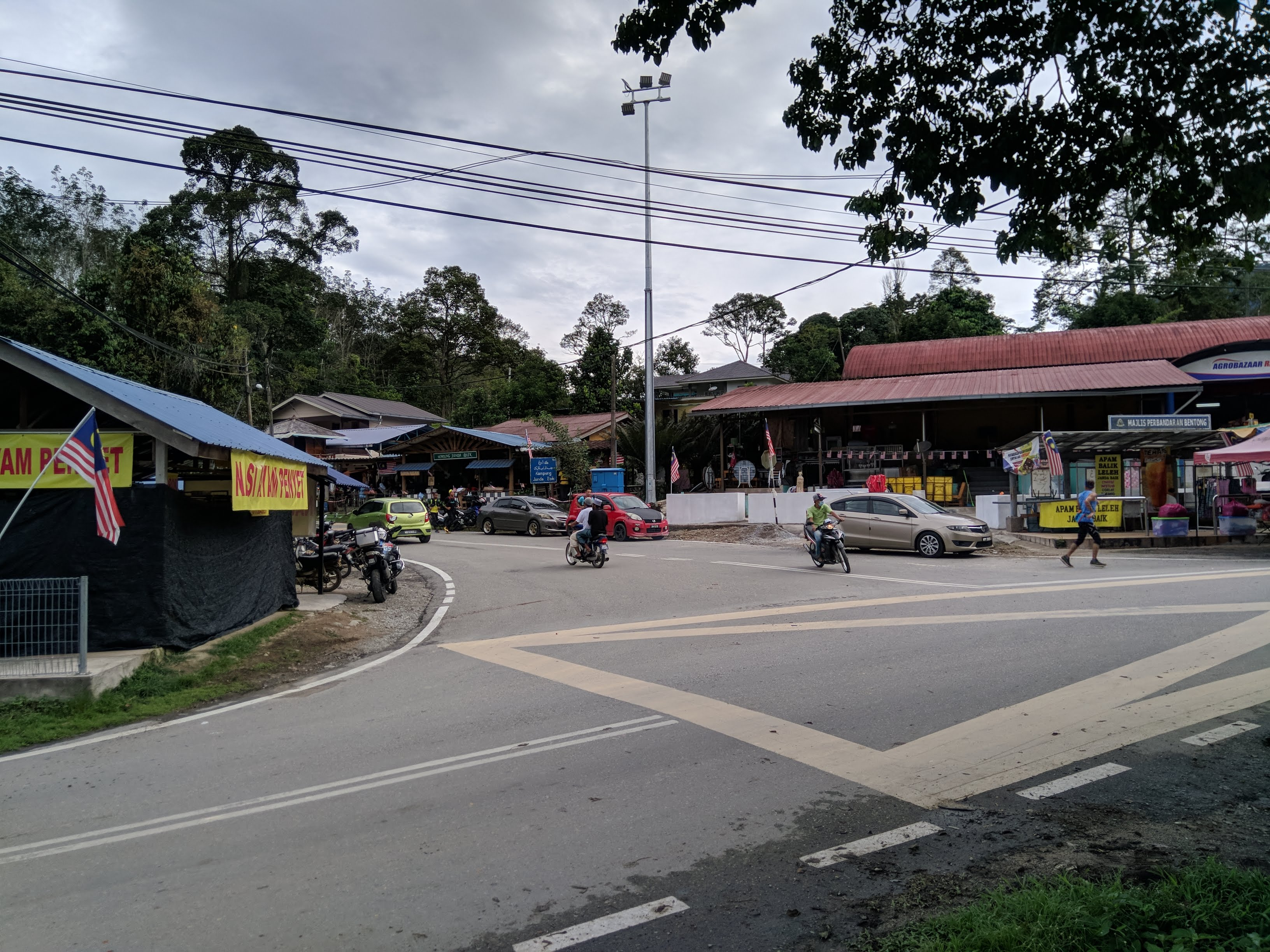
- Central Janda Baik in the morning
- Etymology: Malay: Janda Baik ("the divorcee returns" or "good widow")
- Location within Malaysia Location within Pahang
- Coordinates: 3°19′40.3″N 101°51′21.8″E
- Country: Malaysia
- State: Pahang Darul Makmur
- District: Bentong District
- Village established: 1930 (as Kampung Tiga Haji)
- Elevation: 800 m (2,600 ft)

Population (2019)
  - Total: 2,820
- Time zone: UTC+08:00 (MST)
- Postcode: 28750
- Telephone area code: +60-9

Janda Baik (Bentong Malay: Jando Baék) is a village in Bentong District, Pahang, Malaysia. It is situated about 45 km (28 mi) east of Kuala Lumpur and 800 m (2,600 ft) above sea level. As of 2019, the village had an estimated population of 2,820.

Janda Baik was first settled by three Bentong villagers in 1930 following severe flooding in Bentong in 1926. Over the decades, the settlement expanded and frequently served as a highland retreat for the Sultan of Pahang.

Historically focused on agriculture, Janda Baik has expanded its economy into electronics manufacturing and ecotourism. However, rapid agricultural and tourism development has raised local concerns over deforestation, river erosion, and threats to traditional village life, leading to environmental protests by residents.

== History ==
=== Foundation and etymology ===
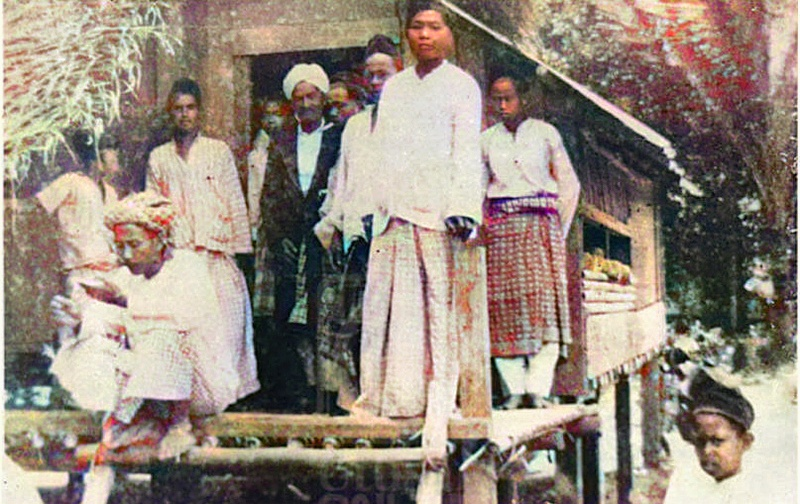
Villagers in front of Janda Baik's first mosque in 1933. Haji Yasir (in black) was one of the three original founders.

Prior to its establishment in 1930, the area was primarily inhabited by Orang Asli indigenous tribes. The village was founded when floodwaters devastated Bentong in 1926, prompting several families to move to higher ground. The early pioneers—Haji Deris, Haji Kadir, and Haji Yasir—built a temporary hut and resided in the area for nearly a week before other settlers joined them. The settlement was initially named Kampung Tiga Haji in honor of its three founders.

The growing settlement attracted the attention of Sultan Abu Bakar of Pahang, who first visited the village in 1932. The Sultan expressed dissatisfaction with the name Kampung Tiga Haji and requested a change.

According to local accounts, a dispute between the Orang Asli chief, Tok Batin Wok, and his wife, Siah, led to a month-long separation. Following their reconciliation, Bentong District Officer Henry Peacock suggested renaming the village "Janda Baik" (literally "good divorcee" or "reconciled widow" in Malay), referencing the mended relationship between the chief and his wife. The village was officially renamed Janda Baik on 19 September 1936. An alternative folk etymology attributes the name to an act of kindness by a local widow who treated injured Pahang soldiers returning from the Selangor Civil War.

The village formerly featured an islet named Pulau Santap in the middle of a large stream running through the settlement. It was used as a royal picnic site by the Sultan of Pahang (the royal honorific santap refers to dining). The islet eventually eroded due to riverbank development.

=== Post-independence ===
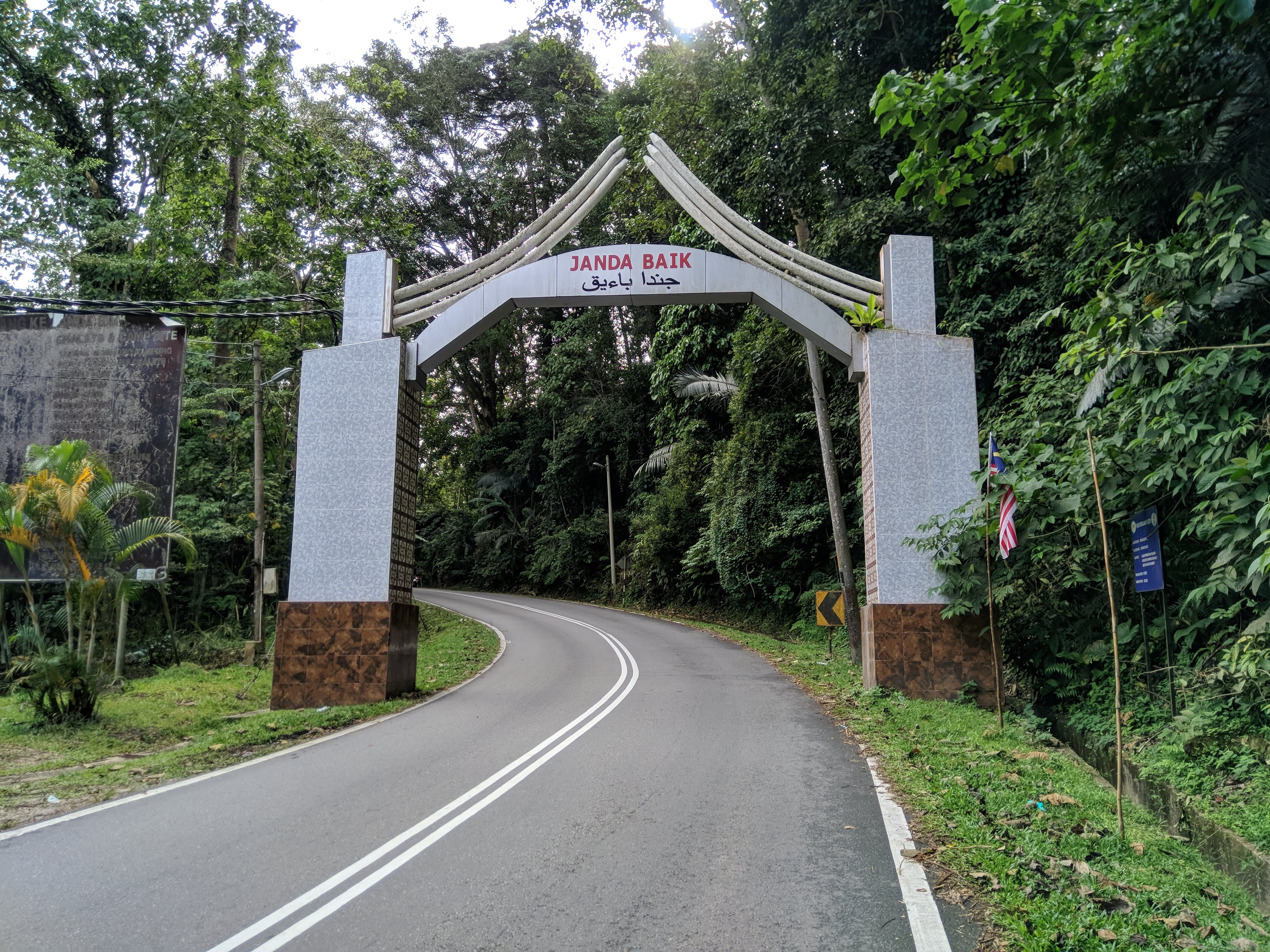
Archway marking the main entrance to Janda Baik

Janda Baik gained national prominence following an aviation incident on 11 January 1982 involving Tan Sri Muhammad Ghazali Shafie, then the Foreign Affairs Minister of Malaysia. Ghazali survived a Cessna 206 crash in the dense Janda Baik forest while en route to a political meeting in Kuala Lipis. He sustained minor injuries, though his co-pilot and bodyguard perished.

In 1990, during the selection of a site for Malaysia's new federal administrative capital (Putrajaya), Janda Baik was among six shortlisted locations. The government ultimately selected Perang Besar in Selangor.

In August 2019, local residents organized protests against unannounced commercial ecotourism projects, expressing concerns that rapid commercialization would degrade traditional village culture, increase traffic congestion, and pollute local rivers.

== Geography ==
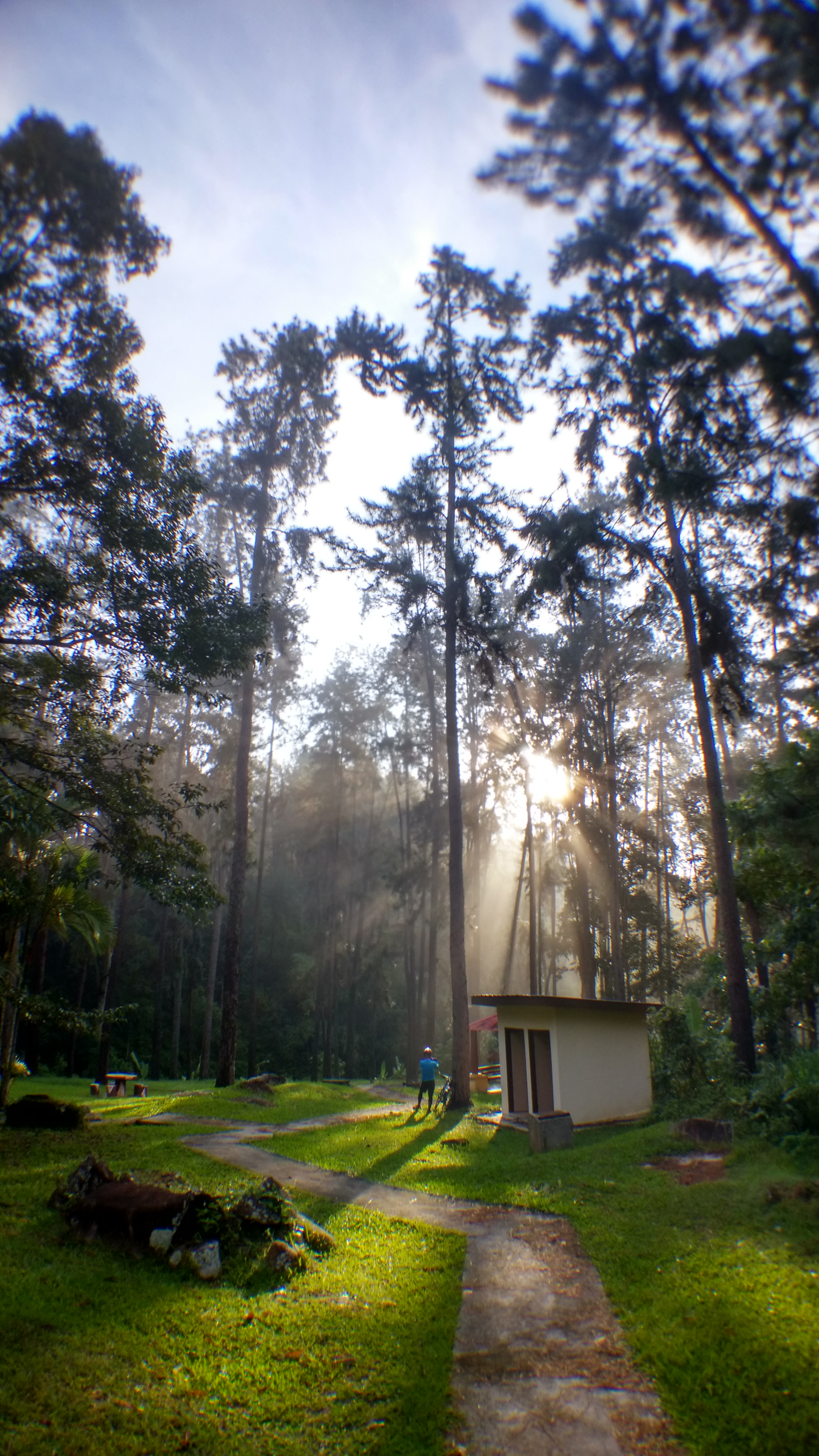
Coniferous and hill dipterocarp forest around Janda Baik

Janda Baik is situated on the Titiwangsa Range at elevations ranging from 600 m (2,000 ft) to 800 m (2,600 ft) above sea level. The surrounding geography consists of rugged mountainous terrain covered by hill dipterocarp and tropical coniferous forests.

The region faces deforestation pressures from expanding agricultural plots and infrastructure development. A proposed high-voltage Tenaga Nasional (TNB) transmission tower line was cancelled in 2015 following public opposition over river erosion risks. In December 2017, the Sultan Ahmad Shah Environment Trust (SASET) launched a reforestation drive targeting former logging sites. The Janda Baik Wildlife Fauna Breeding and Research Facility operates in the area, conducting research on montane wildlife species such as the siamang gibbon and the Indian whistling duck.

=== Climate ===
Janda Baik experiences a tropical rainforest climate (Af under the Köppen climate classification), moderated by its high elevation. Average daytime temperatures range between 23 °C (73 °F) and 28 °C (82 °F), occasionally dropping to 22 °C (72 °F) at night. Annual rainfall averages 2,938 mm (115.7 in), with November being the wettest month (average 391 mm (15.4 in)) and July the driest (average 132 mm (5.2 in)).

Climate data for Janda Baik
Month	Jan	Feb	Mar	Apr	May	Jun	Jul	Aug	Sep	Oct	Nov	Dec	Year
Mean daily maximum °C (°F)	32.4 (90.3)	33.3 (91.9)	33.3 (91.9)	33.6 (92.5)	33.8 (92.8)	33.6 (92.5)	33.0 (91.4)	32.8 (91.0)	32.7 (90.9)	32.8 (91.0)	32.3 (90.1)	31.8 (89.2)	32.9 (91.3)
Daily mean °C (°F)	27.3 (81.1)	27.7 (81.9)	27.7 (81.9)	27.9 (82.2)	28.4 (83.1)	28.7 (83.7)	28.3 (82.9)	28.2 (82.8)	27.9 (82.2)	27.8 (82.0)	27.3 (81.1)	27.1 (80.8)	27.9 (82.1)
Mean daily minimum °C (°F)	23.7 (74.7)	23.7 (74.7)	23.6 (74.5)	23.9 (75.0)	24.2 (75.6)	24.4 (75.9)	24.2 (75.6)	24.4 (75.9)	24.2 (75.6)	24.3 (75.7)	24.2 (75.6)	23.9 (75.0)	24.1 (75.3)
Average precipitation mm (inches)	241 (9.5)	211 (8.3)	295 (11.6)	328 (12.9)	198 (7.8)	137 (5.4)	132 (5.2)	198 (7.8)	208 (8.2)	284 (11.2)	391 (15.4)	315 (12.4)	2,938 (115.7)
Average rainy days	38	35	43	48	33	23	24	29	35	43	59	45	455
Average relative humidity (%)	74.1	72.3	76.3	76.9	74.2	71.8	71.5	72.4	73.3	75.6	79.4	78.8	74.7
Source: championtraveler.com

== Economy ==
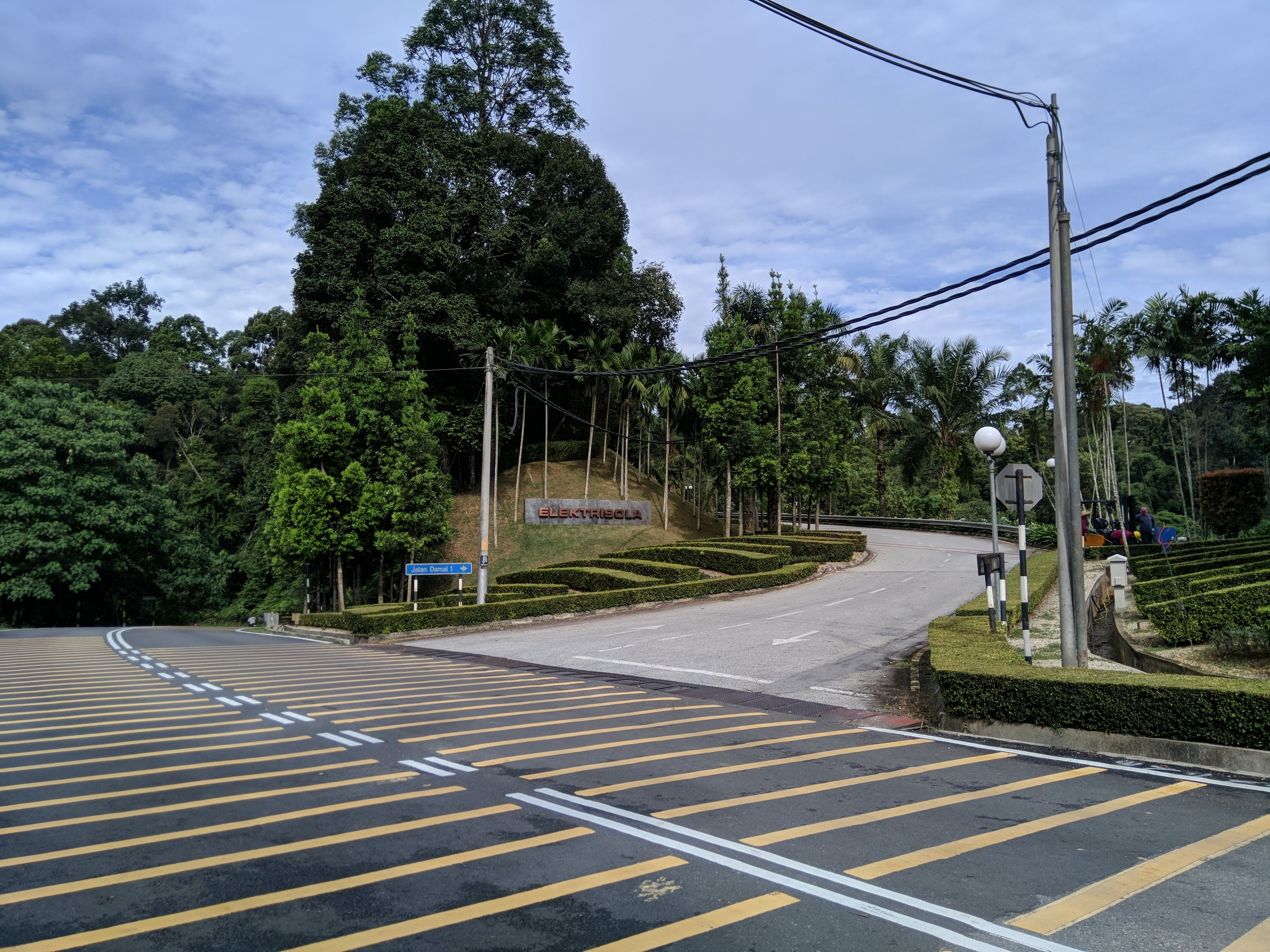
Entrance to the Elektrisola magnet wire factory in Janda Baik

Early settlers engaged primarily in smallholder rubber tapping and paddy cultivation utilizing local stream networks. Paddy yields declined due to lack of irrigation maintenance, leading to field abandonment and weed invasion by Imperata cylindrica. By 2001, approximately 55% of working residents identified as agricultural workers.

In recent decades, commercial organic vegetable farming, agrotourism, and fig cultivation have grown in economic importance.

Industrial activity is centered around Elektrisola, a German multinational manufacturer of fine magnet wires and litz wires. Opened in 1990, the factory employs approximately 1,000 workers from Janda Baik and neighboring settlements, exporting over 90% of its output to Asian, European, and Latin American markets.

== Transport ==
Janda Baik is connected by road via the Kuala Lumpur–Karak Expressway (E8) and Federal Route 68 (the old Kuala Lumpur–Bentong trunk road).

Public transportation is provided by regional stage bus operator Sri Jengka (Bus Route 105), which operates regular daily scheduled services connecting Janda Baik directly with Bentong town terminal via Bukit Tinggi village.

== Sports and recreation ==
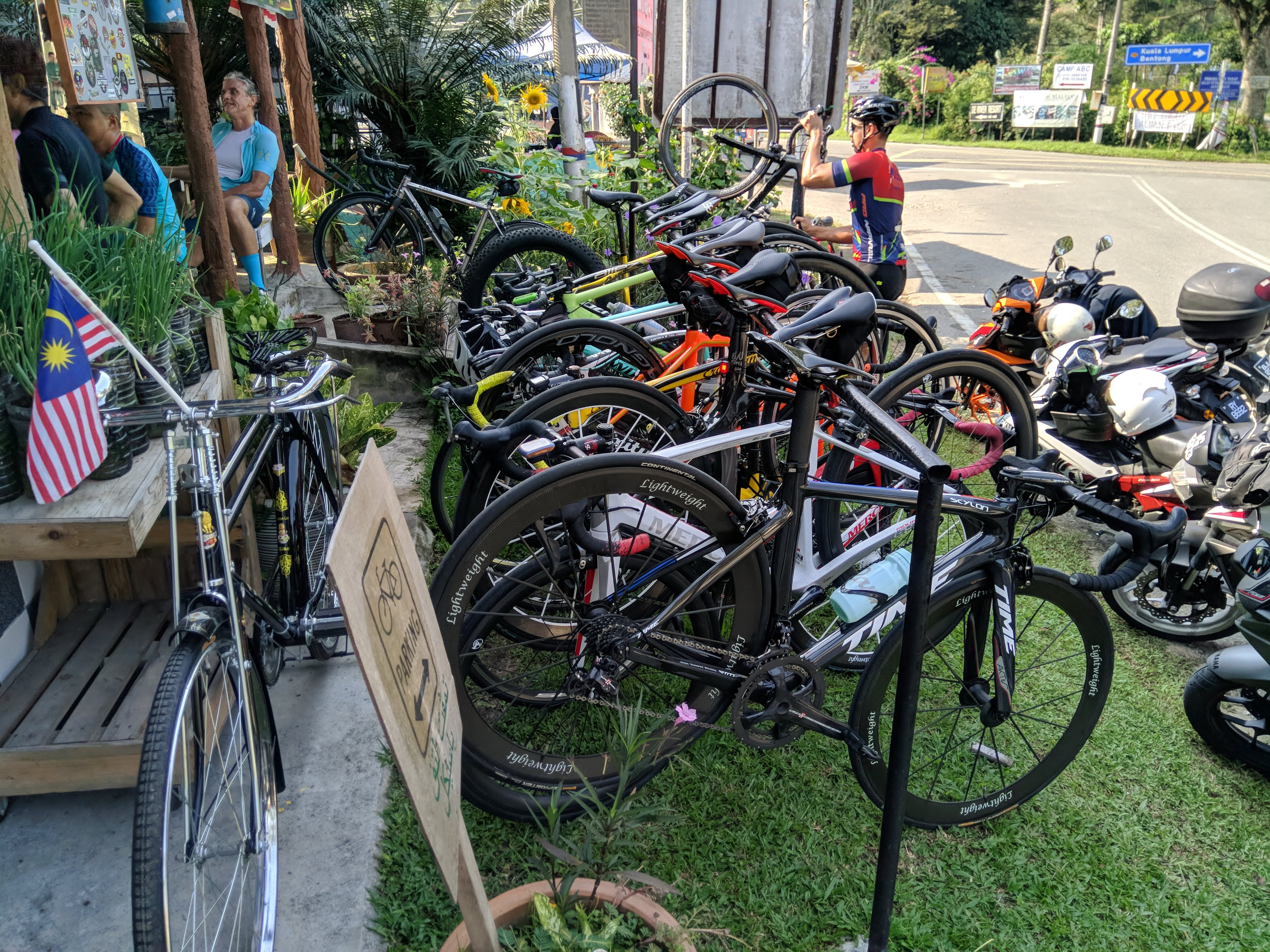
Road bicycles parked at a local cafe

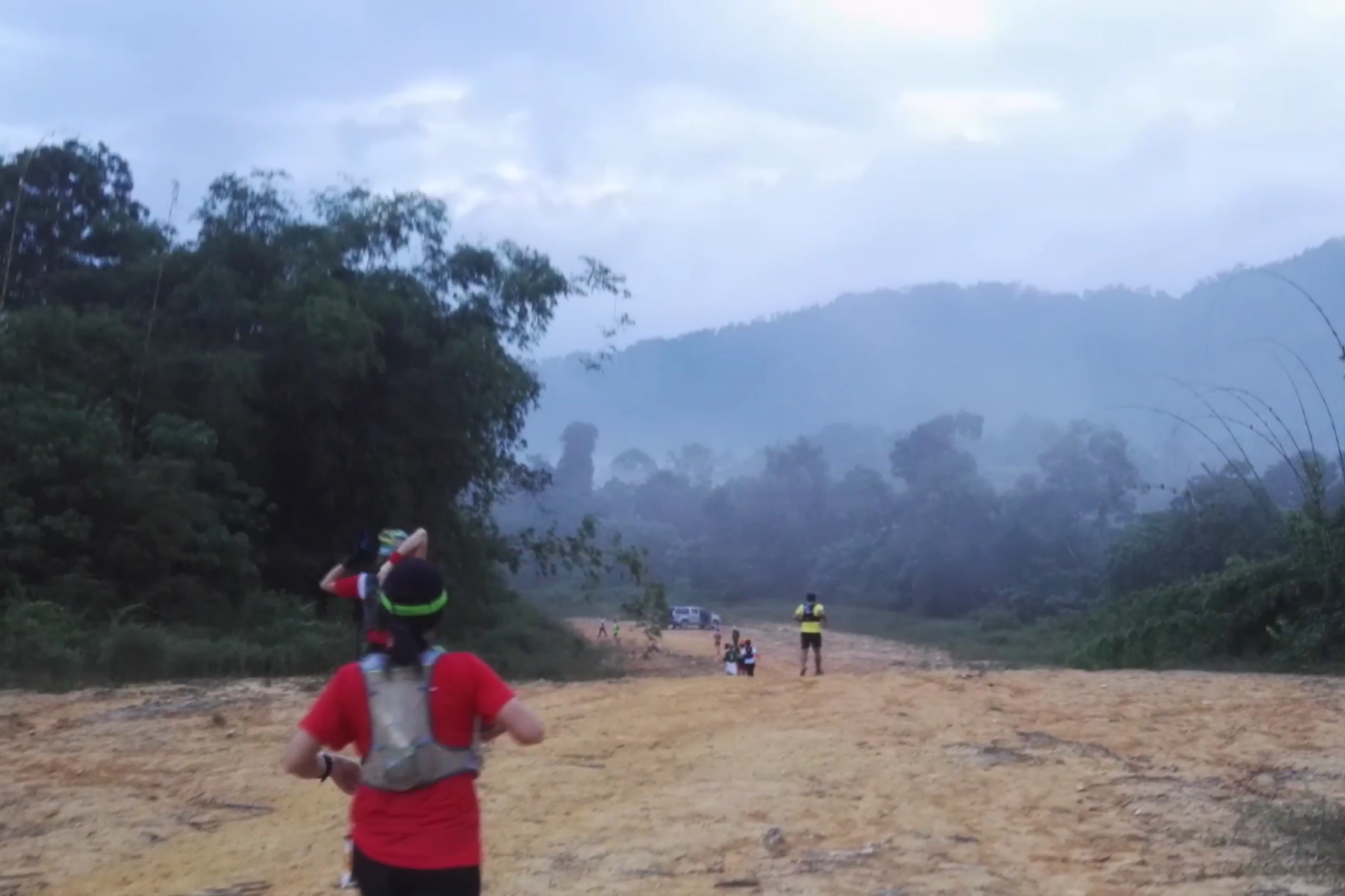
Trail running event in Janda Baik

Recreational activities in Janda Baik

Due to its undulating terrain, mild climate, and scenic roads, Janda Baik is a popular weekend destination for road cyclists, trail runners, and outdoor enthusiasts from the Klang Valley. The village also offers paintball arenas, ATV trail riding, and river tubing resorts.

== Bibliography ==
- Brookfield, Harold (2001). Exploring Agrodiversity. New York City: Columbia University Press. ISBN 9780231501125.
