= Zaid bin Haritsah Mosque =

Mosque in Kuala Lumpur, Malaysia

Zaid bin Haritsah Mosque Masjid Zaid bin Haritsah

Religion
- Affiliation: Islam
- Rite: Shafi‘i

Location
- Location: Kuala Lumpur, Malaysia
- Interactive map of Zaid bin Haritsah Mosque; Masjid Zaid bin Haritsah
- Coordinates: 3°12′40.1″N 101°42′20.3″E

Architecture
- Completed: 1991

Zaid bin Haritsah Mosque or Masjid Zaid bin Haritsah formerly known as Masjid Jamek Sungai Mulia is a mosque in Kuala Lumpur, Malaysia. This mosque is located at kilometre 8 of Jalan Gombak and it was opened in 1991.

== See also ==
- Islam in Malaysia
