= Ketari =

Coordinates: 3°30′N 101°55′E

Ketari is a small town in Bentong District, Pahang, Malaysia. The old Shell petrol station and the Tengku Sulaiman Mosque are two of the oldest landmarks in this town.
