= Manchis =

Place in Pahang, Malaysia

Coordinates: 3°12′N 102°10′E

Manchis is located Bentong District, Pahang, Malaysia. It is 5 km from the border of State of Pahang and Negeri Sembilan and has approximately 200 households. The town and its main road, Jalan Manchis, were damaged by the December 2021 Malaysian floods.
