= Aminuddin Baki Institute =

Educational management institute in Malaysia

Aminuddin Baki Institute Institut Aminuddin Baki

Location
- Malaysia

Aminuddin Baki Institute (Malay: Institut Aminuddin Baki, IAB) is the main educational management institute in Malaysia which trains people to be in the school top management. The main campus is located in Bandar Enstek, Labu, Negeri Sembilan. IAB also have four branches in Genting Highlands (Pahang), Jitra (Kedah), Kota Kinabalu (Sabah) and Kuching (Sarawak). Institut Aminuddin Baki is a member of ANTRIEP, the Asian Network of Training And Research Institutions in Educational Planning.
