= Kuala Lumpur–Karak Expressway =

Controlled-access highway in Peninsular Malaysia

Expressway 8
- Kuala Lumpur–Karak Expressway; Lebuhraya Kuala Lumpur–Karak
- Route map

Route information
- Part of AH141
- Maintained by ANIH Berhad
- Length: 60 km (37 mi)
- Existed: 1974–present
- History: Completed in 1979

Major junctions
- Southwest end: FT 28 Kuala Lumpur Middle Ring Road 2 at Gombak, Selangor
- FT 68 Jalan Gombak–Bentong; Genting Sempah–Genting Highlands Highway; FT 121 Jalan Sambung Kuala Lumpur/Karak–Bentong; FT 8 Kuala Lumpur–Kota Bharu Highway; FT 34 Central Spine Road; FT 2 Jalan Kuantan–Kuala Lumpur
- Northeast end: East Coast Expressway at Karak, Pahang

Location
- Country: Malaysia
- Primary destinations: Gombak, Genting Highlands, Bukit Tinggi, Bentong, Karak

Highway system
- Highways in Malaysia; Expressways; Federal; State

The E8 Kuala Lumpur–Karak Expressway is a 60-kilometre (37 mi) interstate controlled-access highway in Peninsular Malaysia. It runs between the town of Gombak in Selangor to the southwest and Karak in Pahang to the northeast. The expressway was previously a single-carriageway trunk road forming part of Federal Route 2; this designation has been kept after the upgrade in 1997. It shares its designation with the East Coast Expressway proper that succeeds it.

The highway has many hairpin bends and many stretches pass through remote forested terrain. Vehicular crashes, many of them fatal, have often occurred on the highway. Because of its remoteness and high number of crashes, the expressway has been recorded as one of the most dangerous routes in Malaysia.

== Route description ==
The expressway begins at Gombak, Selangor and its interchange with the Kuala Lumpur Middle Ring Road 2. Next, the expressway passes the Titiwangsa Range and the Genting Sempah Tunnel towards Genting Sempah at the border with Pahang.

The section between Bentong and Karak is the sole route from Kuala Lumpur to Kuantan and vice versa, as Jalan Gombak, which serves as the toll-free alternative for the expressway, ends at Ketari, Bentong. At Karak, route 2 splits off, heading southeast towards the town proper while the expressway heads northeast to meet the East Coast Expressway.

== History ==
=== Two-lane federal highway ===
Kuala Lumpur–Karak Highway was originally built in the 1970s by the government of Malaysia as an alternative for the winding, narrow route 68 which runs from Gombak in Kuala Lumpur to Bentong, Pahang. The highway is also a part of route 2. The highway included a 900-metre tunnel at Genting Sempah, which became Malaysia's first highway tunnel ever constructed. It was officially opened in 1979 by the former Minister of Works and Communications, Abdul Ghani Gilong.

However, the cost of the construction of this highway was considered as expensive for Malaysia which at that time was an agricultural country. Therefore, the government decided to make Kuala Lumpur–Karak Highway as a toll road to help cover all the construction works. As a result, two toll gates were constructed at Gombak and Bentong and the toll road was administered under Malaysian Highway Authority. The highway was officially opened to traffic in 1977.

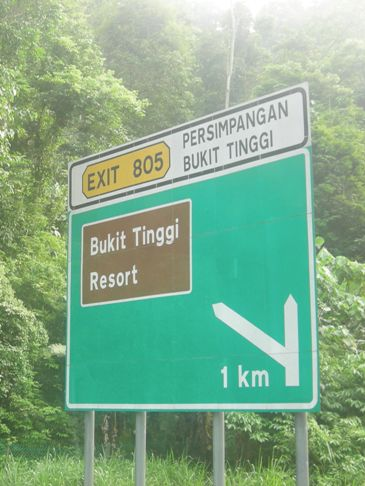
Signage indicating approaching exit to Bukit Tinggi, Pahang

=== Multi-lane expressway ===
The importance of the Kuala Lumpur–Karak Highway as the main road from Kuala Lumpur to the eastern states of Peninsular Malaysia resulted in the government's decision to upgrade the highway to a multi-lane expressway by duplicating the whole highway stretch to one side. Thus, the former two-lane highway became a dual-carriageway with six lanes (three in each direction) from Kuala Lumpur to the Genting Highlands exit and four lanes (two in each direction) for the rest of the expressway.

The upgrade work also included the construction of a second tunnel located beside the existing tunnel to provide additional two lanes for eastbound traffic, widening the toll gates at Gombak and Bentong and also constructing interchanges to replace junctions. However, some junctions were impossible to upgrade to interchanges due to their geographical locations and therefore some U-turns were constructed to provide entry and exit to the junction for the opposite direction of the expressway. The expressway has two separate carriageways at Genting Sempah on the Selangor–Pahang border (one for the Selangor side and one for the Pahang side) due to their geographical locations. The upgrade work was completed in 1997.

MTD Prime held the concession to operate the expressway. The expressway acquired its official route number, E8, at completion, which resulted in overlapping route numbers. As a result, some maps labelled the expressway as E8 and some other maps labelled the expressway as Federal Route 2.

On 7 April 2011, ANIH Berhad became the concession holder after taking over operations from MTD Prime Sdn Bhd and Metramac Corporation Sdn Bhd.

=== Major events ===
- on 28 January 1990, 17 people, including 11 FRU riot police personnel, were killed in a collision between Federal Reserve Unit riot police vehicles, a tanker lorry, a passenger bus, and 10 cars at kilometre 32.5 of the highway not far from Genting Sempah Tunnel in Gombak, Selangor.
- On 11 November 2015, a landslide occurred at km 52.4 of the Kuala Lumpur–Karak Expressway between Lentang and Bukit Tinggi, Pahang due to heavy rains. The Lentang–Bukit Tinggi stretch of the expressway was closed to traffic.
- On 18 December 2021, a storm caused the highway to be blocked in three places by floodwater, mud and forest debris.
- On 25 July 2023, a sinkhole near Bentong Plaza Toll appeared on KM 66.1 at 8.34pm due to the East Coast Rail Link tunnel boring works. It caused the road closure on the site and ANIH Berhad forced road users to use the exit at the Bentong east exit (near the Benus industrial estate) and enter the Bentong west exit (near Bentong toll plaza).

== Toll systems ==
The Kuala Lumpur–Karak Expressway uses a toll system.

=== Electronic Toll Collections (ETC) ===
As part of an initiative to facilitate faster transactions at the Gombak and Bentong Toll Plazas, all toll transactions at both toll plazas on the Kuala Lumpur–Karak Expressway have been conducted electronically via Touch 'n Go cards or SmartTAGs since 9 September 2015.

=== Toll rates ===
(Starting 15 October 2015)

Class	Type of vehicles	Rate (in Malaysian Ringgit (RM))	
Class	Type of vehicles	Gombak	Bentong
0	Motorcycles, bicycles or vehicles with 2 or fewer wheels	Free	
1	Vehicles with 2 axles and 3 or 4 wheels excluding taxis	6.00	3.50
2	Vehicles with 2 axles and 5 or 6 wheels excluding buses	12.00	7.00
3	Vehicles with 3 or more axles	18.00	10.50
4	Taxis	3.00	1.80
5	Buses	5.00	3.00

== Interchange lists ==
Legend:

- I/C - Interchange, I/S - Intersection, RSA - Rest and service area, OBR - Overhead bridge restaurant, R/R - Restaurant and rest plaza, L/B - Layby, V/P - Vista point, TN - tunnel, T/P - Toll plaza, BR - Bridge
- C - Cloverleaf, S - Stack, T-A - Trumpet-A, T-B - Trumpet-B, DT - Directional-T/Y, SDT - Semi-Directional-T/Y, P-Y - Partial-Y, D - Diamond, P-C - Partial cloverleaf, D-D - Diverging diamond, D-R - Direct ramp

State	District	Location	km	mi	Exit	Name	Destinations	Notes
Selangor	Gombak	Gombak	18.00	11.18	801	Gombak I/C	FT 28 (Kuala Lumpur Middle Ring Road 2) / FT 2 / AH141 – Klang, Seremban, Ampang, Ipoh, Petaling Jaya, Kuala Lumpur	
Selangor	Gombak	Gombak	19.90	12.37	Gombak Toll Plaza (barrier system)			
Selangor	Gombak	Gombak	20.00	12.43	Gombak layby (eastbound)			
Selangor	Gombak	Gombak	21.80	13.55	Gombak layby (westbound)			
Selangor	Gombak	Batu 12			Gombak River bridge			
Selangor	Gombak	Genting Sempah	36.57	22.72	803A	Genting Sempah I/C	Genting Sempah–Genting Highlands Highway – Genting Highlands	Eastbound exit and westbound entrance only
Selangor–Pahang border					Genting Sempah tunnel			
Pahang	Bentong	Genting Sempah	38.30	23.80	803	Genting Sempah I/C	FT 68 Jalan Gombak–Bentong – Genting Sempah, Genting Highlands, Janda Baik	
Pahang	Bentong	Genting Sempah	38.30	23.80	Genting Sempah rest and service area (both directions; combined)			
Pahang	Bentong	Bukit Tinggi	43.00	26.72	–	–	Unnamed road – Bukit Tinggi, Janda Baik	
Pahang	Bentong	Bukit Tinggi	48.00	29.83	805	Bukit Tinggi I/C	Jalan Berjaya Hills Resort – Berjaya Hills Resort	
Pahang	Bentong	Bukit Tinggi	51.50	32.00	Lentang layby (both directions; combined)			
Pahang	Bentong	Bentong	61.71	38.34	Bentong Toll Plaza (barrier system)			
Pahang	Bentong	Bentong	62.10	38.59	Bentong layby (westbound)			
Pahang	Bentong	Bentong	62.40	38.77	808	Bentong West I/C	FT 68 Jalan Gombak–Bentong – Bentong, Raub, Kuala Lipis	Eastbound entrance and exit only
Pahang	Bentong	Bentong			809	Mempaga I/C	FT 34 Central Spine Road – Bentong, Raub, Gua Musang Pelangai	
Pahang	Bentong	Bentong	66.80	41.51	810	Bentong East I/C	FT 8 Federal Route 8 – Bentong, Raub, Kuala Lipis	
Pahang	Bentong	Karak			813A	Karak I/C	FT 2 Jalan Kuantan–Kuala Lumpur – Karak; FT 1498 Jalan Mempaga – Kampung Cinta Manis, Sertik, FELDA Mempaga	Eastbound exit and westbound entrance only Eastern terminus of concurrency with route 2
Pahang	Bentong	Karak			Through to East Coast Expressway / AH141			
1.000 mi = 1.609 km; 1.000 km = 0.621 mi: Concurrency terminus; Electronic toll collection; Incomplete access

== See also ==
- Malaysian Expressway System
- East Coast Expressway
