= Genting Sempah Tunnel =

Road tunnel in Malaysia

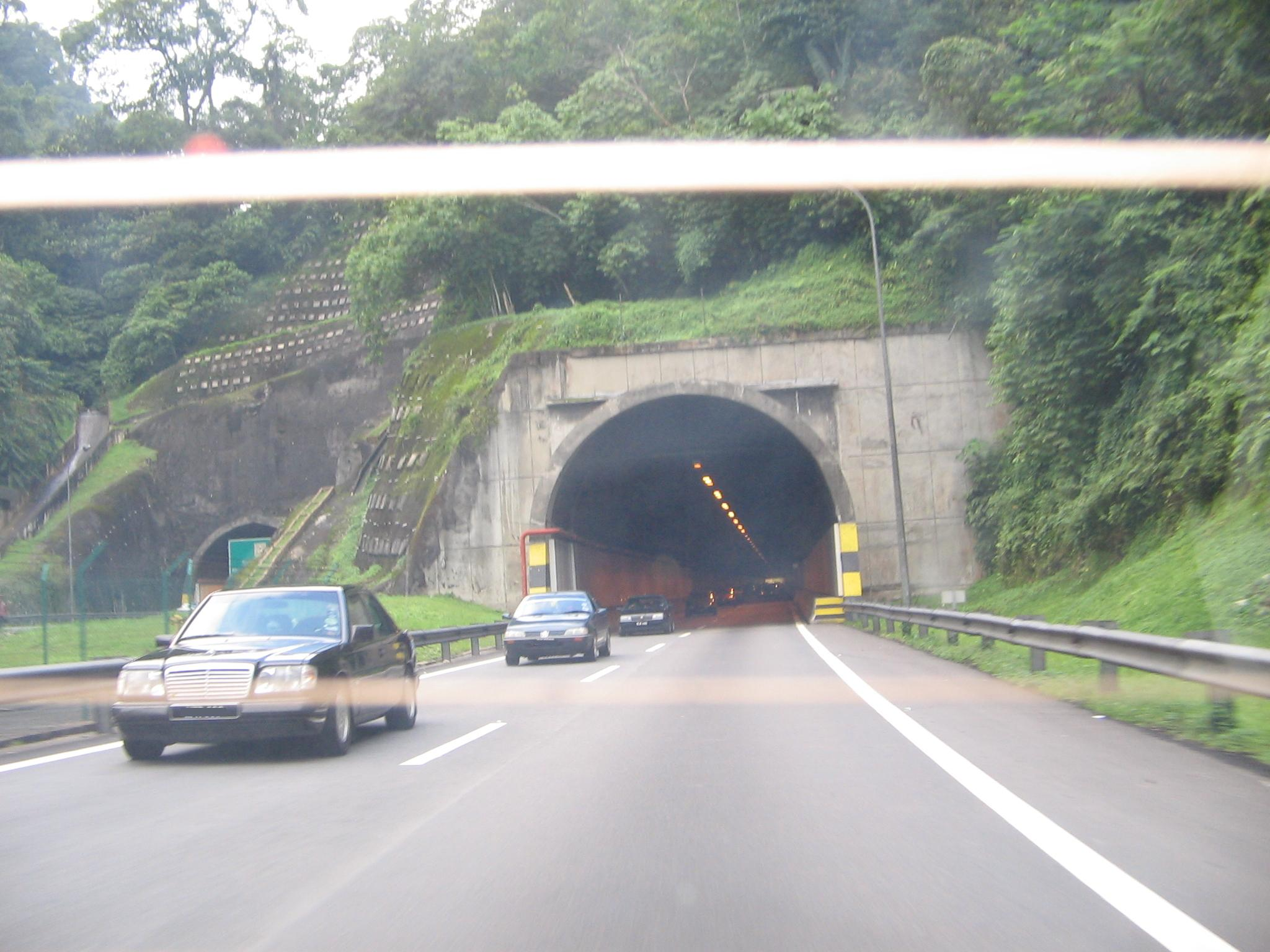
- Interactive map of Genting Sempah Tunnel

Overview
- Location: Genting Sempah, Selangor–Pahang border, Malaysia
- Coordinates: 3.35000°N 101.78375°E
- Status: Operational
- Route: East Coast Expressway Kuala Lumpur–Karak Expressway
- Crosses: Titiwangsa Range

Operation
- Work began: 1974
- Constructed: Malaysian Highway Authority (LLM) (Original Tunnel); MTD Construction Sdn Bhd (Second Tunnel)
- Opened: 1978
- Owner: Government of Malaysia; Malaysian Highway Authority (LLM)
- Operator: ANIH Berhad (formerly known as MTD Prime Sdn Bhd)

Technical
- Length: 900 m (3,000 ft)
- Operating speed: 90 km/h
- Max elevation: 600 m (2,000 ft)
- Tunnel clearance: 5.5 m (18 ft)
- Width: 10.5 m (34 ft)

The Genting Sempah Tunnel is the first highway tunnel in Malaysia. Located on the Kuala Lumpur–Karak Expressway, the 900-metre (3,000 ft) tunnel connects Gombak in Selangor to Genting Sempah, Pahang. This tunnel was constructed between 1974 and 1977. The tunnel was officially opened in 1978 by the former Minister of Works and Communications, Abdul Ghani Gilong.

The tunnel was once used to be the longest road tunnel in Malaysia before the construction of the 4-km SMART Tunnel which was opened in 2007.

Originally, the Genting Sempah Tunnel was used to be a 2-lane single-carriageway tunnel but then an additional tunnel for the eastbound traffic was constructed between 1995 and 1997 when the Karak Expressway was upgraded from a 2-lane highway to a high-speed multi-lane expressway.

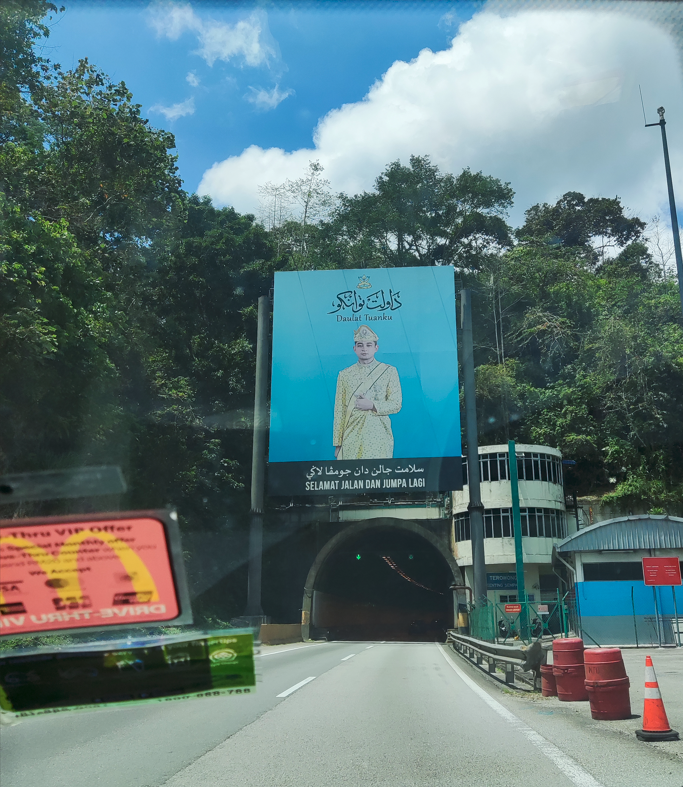
Entrance of Genting Sempah Tunnel from the Pahang side in 2023. Above the entrance is the image of then Pahang Regent, Tengku Hassanal Ibrahim Alam Shah.

== See also ==
- Transport in Malaysia
