= Sabai (state constituency) =

State constituency in Bentong, Pahang, Malaysia

Sabai (N35)
Pahang constituency

State constituency
- Legislature: Pahang State Legislative Assembly
MLA
Arumugam Verappa Pillai
BN
- Constituency created: 1959
- Constituency abolished: 1974
- Constituency re-created: 1994
- First contested: 1959
- Last contested: 2022

Demographics
- Electors (2022): 15,643

Sabai is a state constituency in Bentong, Pahang, Malaysia. Sabai is currently represented in the Pahang State Legislative Assembly.

The state constituency is mandated to return a single member to the Pahang State Legislative Assembly under the first past the post voting system.

The current voter composition of Sabai is 40.31% Malay, 33.94% Chinese, 20.22% Indian and 5.52% Others.

== Demographics ==
Ethnic breakdown of Sabai's electorate as of 2022
1. Malay (40.3%)
2. Chinese (33.9%)
3. Indian (20.2%)
4. Other ethnicities (5.52%)

== Polling districts ==
According to the federal gazette issued on 31 October 2022, the Sabai constituency is divided into 8 polling districts.

State constituency	Polling district	Code	Location
Sabai (N35)	FELDA Sertik	089/35/01	SK LKTP Kampung Sertik
Sabai (N35)	Jambu Rias	089/35/02	SK Jambu Rias
Sabai (N35)	Sri Telemong	089/35/03	SJK (T) Sri Telemong
Sabai (N35)	Pekan Karak	089/35/04	SMK Karak
Sabai (N35)	Karak Setia	089/35/05	SMK Karak Setia
Sabai (N35)	Bukit Dinding	089/35/06	SJK (T) Karak
Sabai (N35)	Taman Karak	089/35/07	SJK (C) Karak
Sabai (N35)	Kampung Baru Karak	089/35/08	SK Karak

== History ==
Members of the Legislative Assembly for Sabai
Assembly	No	Years	Name	Party
Constituency created
1st	N05	1959-1964	Abu Bakar Ahmad	Alliance (UMNO)
2nd	N05	1964-1969	Abu Bakar Ahmad	Alliance (UMNO)
		1969-1971	Assembly dissolved	
3rd	N05	1971-1973	Abu Bakar Ahmad	Alliance (UMNO)
3rd	N05	1973-1974	Abu Bakar Ahmad	BN (UMNO)
Constituency abolished, split into Semantan and Karak
Constituency recreated from Karak and Pelangai
9th	N30	1995-1999	R. Sinnathamby	BN (MIC)
10th	N30	1999-2004	Davendran Murthy	BN (MIC)
11th	N35	2004-2008	Davendran Murthy	BN (MIC)
12th	N35	2008-2013	Davendran Murthy	BN (MIC)
13th	N35	2013-2015	Kamache Doray Rajoo	PR (DAP)
13th	N35	2015-2018	Kamache Doray Rajoo	PH (DAP)
14th	N35	2018-2022	Kamache Doray Rajoo	PH (DAP)
15th	N35	2022–present	Arumugam Verappa Pillai	BN (MIC)

== Election results ==
Pahang state election, 2022
Party	Candidate	Votes	%	∆%
BN	Arumugam Verappa Pillai	4,444	37.52	▼2.16
PH	Kamache Doray Rajoo	4,348	36.71	▲36.71
PN	Nurul Qomar Abdol Talin @ Ramali	3,053	25.77	▲25.77
Total valid votes		11,845	100.00	
Total rejected ballots		136		
Unreturned ballots		24		
Turnout		12,005	76.74	▼5.88
Registered electors		15,643		
Majority		96	0.81	▼4.26
BN gain from PKR		Swing		?

Pahang state election, 2018
Party	Candidate	Votes	%	∆%
PKR	Kamache Doray Rajoo	4,374	44.75	▲44.75
BN	Goonasakaren Raman	3,879	39.68	▼9.65
PAS	Mohd Khairuddin Abdullah	1,308	13.38	▲13.38
Independent	Karunaneethi Thangavel	145	1.48	▲1.48
Total valid votes		9,775	100.00	
Total rejected ballots		166		
Unreturned ballots		19		
Turnout		9,891	82.62	▲12.23
Registered electors		11,971		
Majority		495	5.07	▲3.73
PKR hold		Swing		?

Pahang state election, 2013
Party	Candidate	Votes	%	∆%
DAP	Kamache Doray Rajoo	4,439	50.67	▲1.79
BN	Goonasakaren Raman	4,322	49.33	▼1.79
Total valid votes		8,761	100.00	
Total rejected ballots		240		
Unreturned ballots		25		
Turnout		9,891	70.39	▼0.21
Registered electors		10,868		
Majority		117	1.34	▼0.90
DAP gain from BN		Swing		?

Pahang state election, 2008
Party	Candidate	Votes	%	∆%
BN	Davendran Murthy	3,304	51.12	▼16.96
DAP	Kamache Doray Rajoo	3,159	48.88	▲16.96
Total valid votes		6,463	100.00	
Total rejected ballots		236		
Unreturned ballots		17		
Turnout		6,716	70.80	▲0.41
Registered electors		9,486		
Majority		145	2.24	▼33.93
BN hold		Swing		?

Pahang state election, 2004
Party	Candidate	Votes	%	∆%
BN	Davendran Murthy	4,384	68.09	▲9.58
DAP	Lee Hon	2,055	31.91	▼9.58
Total valid votes		6,439	100.00	
Total rejected ballots		240		
Unreturned ballots		19		
Turnout		6,698	70.39	▲0.01
Registered electors		9,516		
Majority		2,329	36.17	▲19.15
BN hold		Swing		

Pahang state election, 1999
Party	Candidate	Votes	%	∆%
BN	Davendran Murthy	3,748	58.51	▲1.94
DAP	Woo Chee Wan	2,658	41.49	▲7.62
Total valid votes		6,406	100.00	
Total rejected ballots		207		
Unreturned ballots		28		
Turnout		6,641	70.37	▼0.77
Registered electors		9,437		
Majority		1,090	17.02	▼5.68
BN hold		Swing		

Pahang state election, 1995
Party	Candidate	Votes	%	∆%
BN	Sinnathamby Ramasamy	3,377	56.57	▲56.57
DAP	Soon San Choong	2,022	33.87	▲33.87
Independent	Mohamed Basri Mahidin	571	9.56	▲9.56
Total valid votes		5,970	100.00	
Total rejected ballots		212		
Unreturned ballots		30		
Turnout		6,212	71.14	
Registered electors		8,732		
Majority		1,355	22.70	
BN hold		Swing		

Pahang state election, 1969
Party	Candidate	Votes	%	∆%
Alliance	Abu Bakar Ahmad	3,343	61.34	▼9.57
Independent	Toh Wai Theng	2,107	38.66	▲38.66
Total valid votes		5,450	100.00	
Total rejected ballots		114		
Unreturned ballots		0		
Turnout		5,564	75.24	▼6.96
Registered electors		7,395		
Majority		1,236	22.68	▼19.14
Alliance hold		Swing		

Pahang state election, 1964
Party	Candidate	Votes	%	∆%
Alliance	Abu Bakar Ahmad	3,454	70.91	▼8.47
Socialist Front	Leong Saik Yuen	1,417	29.09	▲29.09
Total valid votes		4,871	100.00	
Total rejected ballots		264		
Unreturned ballots		0		
Turnout		5,135	82.20	▲0.80
Registered electors		6,247		
Majority		2,037	41.82	▼16.93
Alliance hold		Swing		

Pahang state election, 1959
Party	Candidate	Votes	%
Alliance	Abu Bakar Ahmad	2,698	79.38
Independent	Leong Thoe Cheok	701	20.62
Total valid votes		3,399	100.00
Total rejected ballots		97	
Unreturned ballots		0	
Turnout		3,496	81.40
Registered electors		4,295	
Majority		1,997	58.75
This was a new constituency created.
