= Genting Sempah =

Town in Pahang, Malaysia

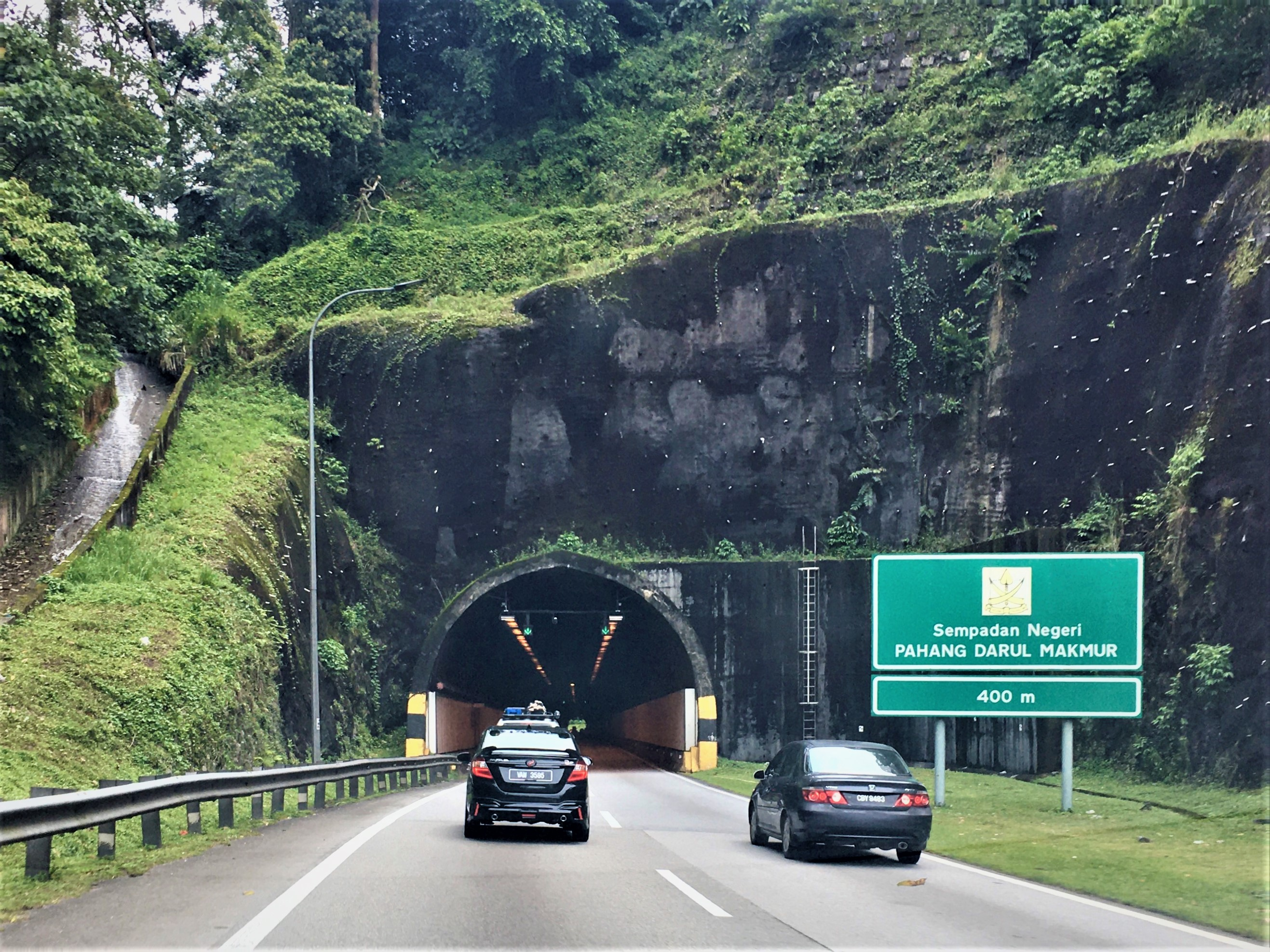
- Genting Sempah Tunnel, entering Pahang
- Interactive map of Genting Sempah
- Elevation: 600 metres (2,000 ft)
- Traversed by: Kuala Lumpur–Karak Expressway

Third Approach
- Location: Bentong District, Pahang; Gombak District, Selangor
- Range: Titiwangsa Mountains
- Coordinates: 3°20′59″N 101°46′50″E

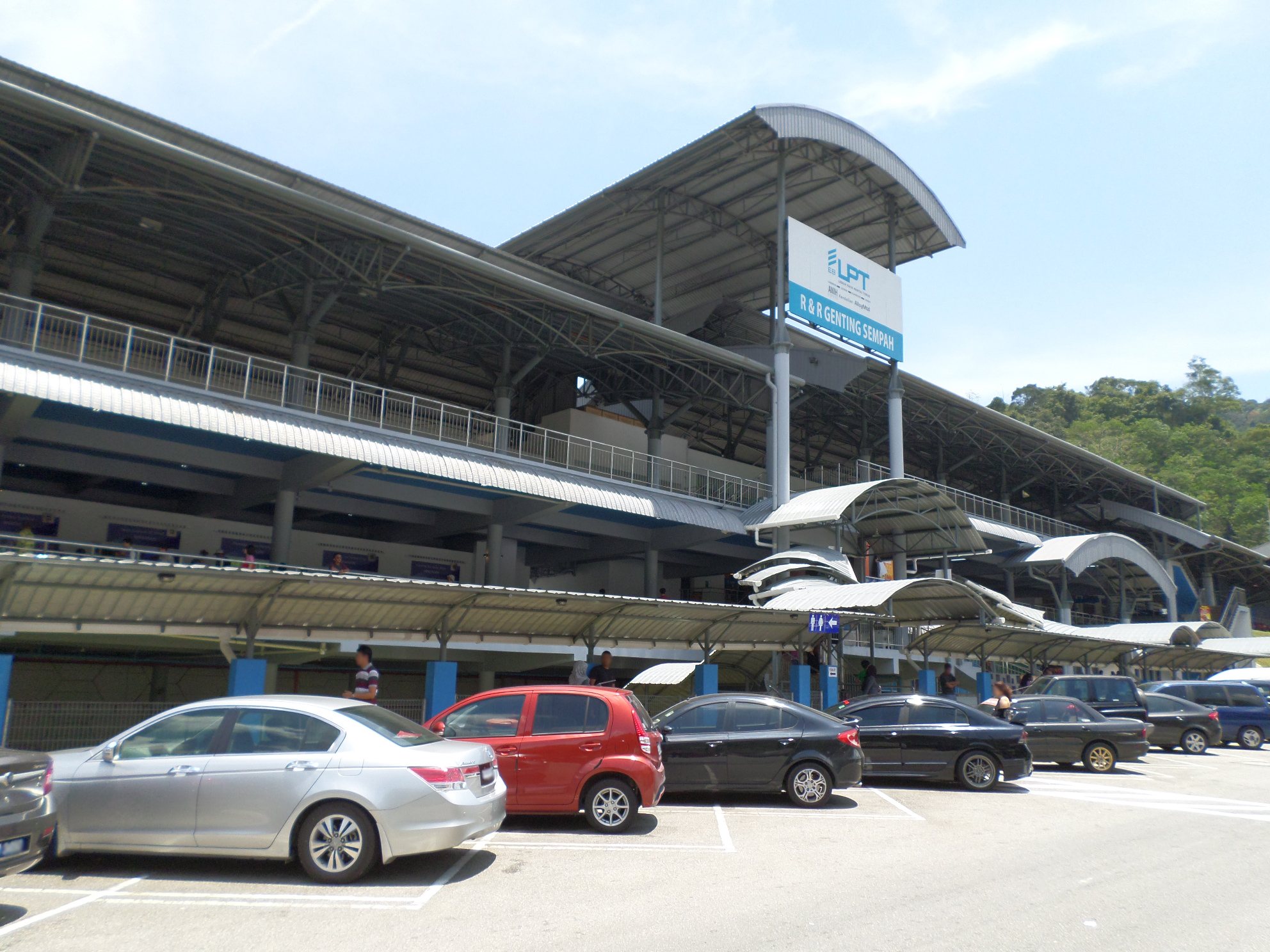
Genting Sempah Rest Area (RNR)

Sempah Pass (Malay: Genting Sempah) is a transit town and mountain pass in the Titiwangsa Range in Bentong District, Pahang, Malaysia, on the border with the neighbouring state of Selangor. Genting Sempah is mostly known as a transit point to Genting Highlands, a famed hill station located on the peak of Mount Ulu Kali.
