= Kampung Sungai Pusu =

Village in Gombak, Selangor, Malaysia

Coordinates: 3°15′N 101°45′E

Sungai Pusu in Gombak District

Kampung Sungai Pusu is a small village in Gombak District, Selangor, Malaysia. This village is located near International Islamic University Malaysia (IIUM) main campus.
