= Bukit Tinggi, Pahang =

Coordinates: 3°21′0″N 101°49′12″E

Bukit Tinggi
- Hill station
- Interactive map of Bukit Tinggi
- Country: Malaysia
- State: Pahang
- District: Bentong District
- Elevation: 800 m (2,600 ft)
- Time zone: UTC+8 (MST)
  - Summer (DST): Not observed

Bukit Tinggi is a small town in Bentong District, Pahang, Malaysia. This small town is located along Kuala Lumpur–Karak Expressway, notable for luring visitors coming from Genting Highlands. The town features a French-themed village, Colmar Tropicale.

== About ==
Bukit Tinggi is located 55 minutes from Kuala Lumpur (54.3 km) and lies 800 metres above sea level. The temperature of the town is between 22 and 26°C. In 1987, there were plans to develop the town in order to alleviate the congestion of Kuala Lumpur.

== Notable attractions ==
- Berjaya Hills Resort
- Colmar Tropicale - a French themed resort
- Bukit Tinggi Golf and Country Club
- Japanese Tea House and Botanical Garden
- Bukit Tinggi Rabbit Farm
