= Gombak (town) =

Town in Gombak, Selangor, Malaysia

Gombak (Chinese: 鵝嘜) is a town in the mukim of Setapak in the coterminous Gombak District, Selangor, Malaysia, to the northeast of Kuala Lumpur.

== History ==
Gombak was first established in the 19th century by the Minangkabau immigrants with the consent of the Sultan of Selangor.

== Geography ==
The town is situated alongside Jalan Gombak, in the northeastern fringes of Kuala Lumpur, just across the border from Wangsa Maju. Other adjacent towns include Ulu Klang, Ampang and Batu Caves.

Gombak town is located in Selangor but a small fraction of the town spills into the Federal Territory of Kuala Lumpur.

Among the postcode numbers that are allocated for this town are 53100, 53000 and 68100.

Gombak town is administered by both Majlis Perbandaran Selayang (Selangor side) and Dewan Bandaraya Kuala Lumpur (Kuala Lumpur side).

== Transportation ==
=== Public transport ===
The town is served by the KJ1 Gombak LRT station on the 5 Kelana Jaya Line. Gombak station is the first station of the line. The under-construction East Coast Rail Link, planned to open on January 2027, will also start here.

=== Car ===
MRR2 Federal Route 28 runs through much of Gombak town.

Gombak is also notable for being the starting point of the East Coast Expressway (Lebuhraya Pantai Timur) East Coast Expressway.

== Residential areas ==
Gombak consists of many villages and housing area including:

- Batu 3 1/2 - Pahang Border
- Taman Desa Gombak
- Kampung Puah Asal
- Kampung Puah Lembah
- Kampung Sungai Merali
- Kampung Kuantan
- Kampung Banda Dalam
- Kampung Padang Balang
- Setapak Garden
- Taman Ibukota
- Taman Medan Idaman
- Kampung Sungai Mulia
- Kampung Lee Kong Chian
- Kampung Kerdas
- Kampung Changkat
- Gombak Setia
- Taman Perwira
- Taman Setia
- Taman Perwira Indah
- Taman Harmonis
- Taman Bukit Sentosa
- Kampung Tengah
- Taman Bukit Lela
- Kampung Simpang 3
- Taman Berlian
- Taman Sahabat
- Taman Desa Minang
- Taman Melewar
- Taman Rowther
- Kampung Lembah Melewar
- Taman Koperasi Polis (1)
- Taman Changkat Desa
- Taman Greenwood
- Taman Greenwood Indah
- Kampung Sungai Chinchin
- Kampung Sungai Pusu
- Taman Villa Bestari
- Taman Desa Gemilang
- Kampung Sungai Salak
- Taman Rawiyah Sulaiman Jaya
- Taman Desa Makmur
- Kampung Bukit Kala
- Kampung Sungai Rumput
