= Bentong =

Town in Pahang, Malaysia

- Town and district capital
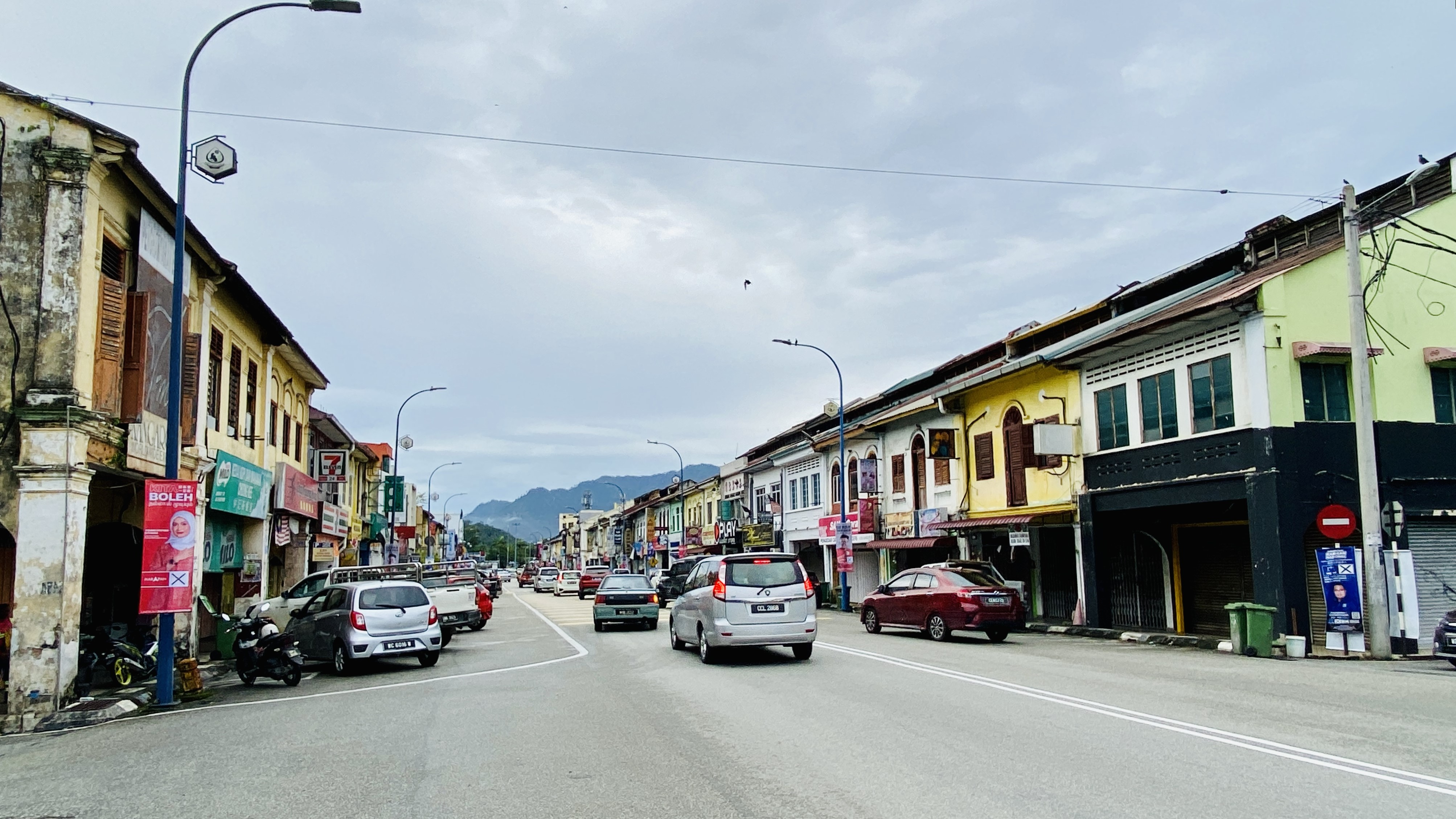
- Loke Yew Street

- Seal

- Location within Malaysia Location within Pahang
- Coordinates: 3°31′N 101°55′E
- Country: Malaysia
- State: Pahang
- District: Bentong District
- Municipality status: 16 July 2005

Government
  - Type: Local government
  - Body: Bentong Municipal Council
  - President: Aida Munira Abdul Rafar

Area
  - Total: 1,105.19 km^{2} (426.72 sq mi)

Population (2010)
  - Total: 114,397
  - Density: 103.509/km^{2} (268.087/sq mi)
- Postcode: 28xxx
- Telephone area code: +6-09
- Vehicle registration: C
- Website: www.mpbentong.gov.my

Bentong Municipal Council Majlis Perbandaran Bentong مجليس ڤربندرن بنتوڠ

Type
- Type: Local authority

History
- Founded: 16 July 2005
- Preceded by: Bentong District Council

Leadership
- President: Aida Munira Abdul Rafar
- Secretary: Noorul Nazreen Nordin

Motto
- Pembangunan, Kebersihan, Perpaduan (Development, Cleanliness, Unity)

Meeting place
- Jalan Ketari, 28700 Bentong, Pahang Darul Makmur

Website
- www.mpbentong.gov.my

Bentong, the seat of Bentong District, is a town located in western Pahang, Malaysia, at the border with the state of Selangor in the west and the state of Negeri Sembilan in the south.

== Government ==
Bentong Municipal Council (Malay: Majlis Perbandaran Bentong) is the local authority for the whole of Bentong District including Bentong town. From 5 May 1955 until 30 June 1981, Bentong town was governed by the Bentong Town Council (Malay: Majlis Bandaran Bentong). On 1 July 1981, the Bentong Town Council was merged with 5 local councils of Karak, Sungai Dua, Telemong, Manchis and Bukit Tinggi and 8 village councils of Kampung Shafie, Kampung Simpang Pelangai, Sungai Gapoi New Village, Kampung Jambu Rias, Kampung Benus, Genting Sempah, Kampung Janda Baik and Sungai Penjuring New Village to form the Bentong District Council (Malay: Majlis Daerah Bentong).

The administrative area of Bentong District Council at the time of establishment was 106.18 square kilometres (41.00 mi^{2}), consisting 80.26 square kilometres (30.99 mi^{2}) operational area and 25.92 square kilometres (10.01 mi^{2}) control area. It was then increased to 1,105.19 square kilometres (426.72 mi^{2}) on 1 January 2001 consisting new operational area of 867.69 square kilometres (335.02 mi^{2}) and control area of 237.5 square kilometres (91.7 mi^{2}). Bentong District Council was upgraded to the present-day Municipal Council on 16 July 2005.

Bentong is currently represented in the Dewan Rakyat by Young Syefura Othman from DAP. Bentong has four seats in Pahang State Legislative Assembly. Bilut, Ketari, Sabai and Pelangai. Both Bilut and Ketari are held by Pakatan Harapan while Sabai and Pelangai are held by Barisan Nasional.

== Weather ==
Bentong average temperature is 26.8 °C (80.2 °F). It has 2,419 millimetres (95.2 in) every year.

Climate data for Bentong
Month	Jan	Feb	Mar	Apr	May	Jun	Jul	Aug	Sep	Oct	Nov	Dec	Year
Daily mean °C (°F)	26 (79)	26.6 (79.9)	27 (81)	27.5 (81.5)	27.4 (81.3)	27.1 (80.8)	26.7 (80.1)	27.1 (80.8)	26.8 (80.2)	26.8 (80.2)	26.7 (80.1)	26.4 (79.5)	26.8 (80.4)
Average precipitation mm (inches)	185 (7.3)	149 (5.9)	179 (7.0)	233 (9.2)	226 (8.9)	133 (5.2)	133 (5.2)	142 (5.6)	188 (7.4)	278 (10.9)	315 (12.4)	258 (10.2)	2,419 (95.2)
Source: Climate-Data.org (altitude: 77m)
