= Bentong District =

- District of Pahang
- Daerah Bentong
- Location of Bentong District in Pahang
- Interactive map of Bentong District
- Location of Bentong District in Malaysia
- Coordinates: 3°25′N 101°55′E
- Country: Malaysia
- State: Pahang
- Seat: Bentong
- Local area government(s): Bentong Municipal Council

Government
  - District officer: Yang Hormat Dato' Mohd Zulkifli Bin Hashim

Area
  - Total: 1,831.12 km^{2} (707.00 sq mi)

Population (2020)
  - Total: 168,960
  - Density: 92.271/km^{2} (238.98/sq mi)
- Time zone: UTC+8 (MST)
  - Summer (DST): UTC+8 (Not observed)
- Postcode: 28xxx, 69xxx (Genting Highlands)
- Calling code: +6-09, +6-03-6 (Genting Highlands)
- Vehicle registration plates: C
- MP: Young Syefura Othman (DAP)

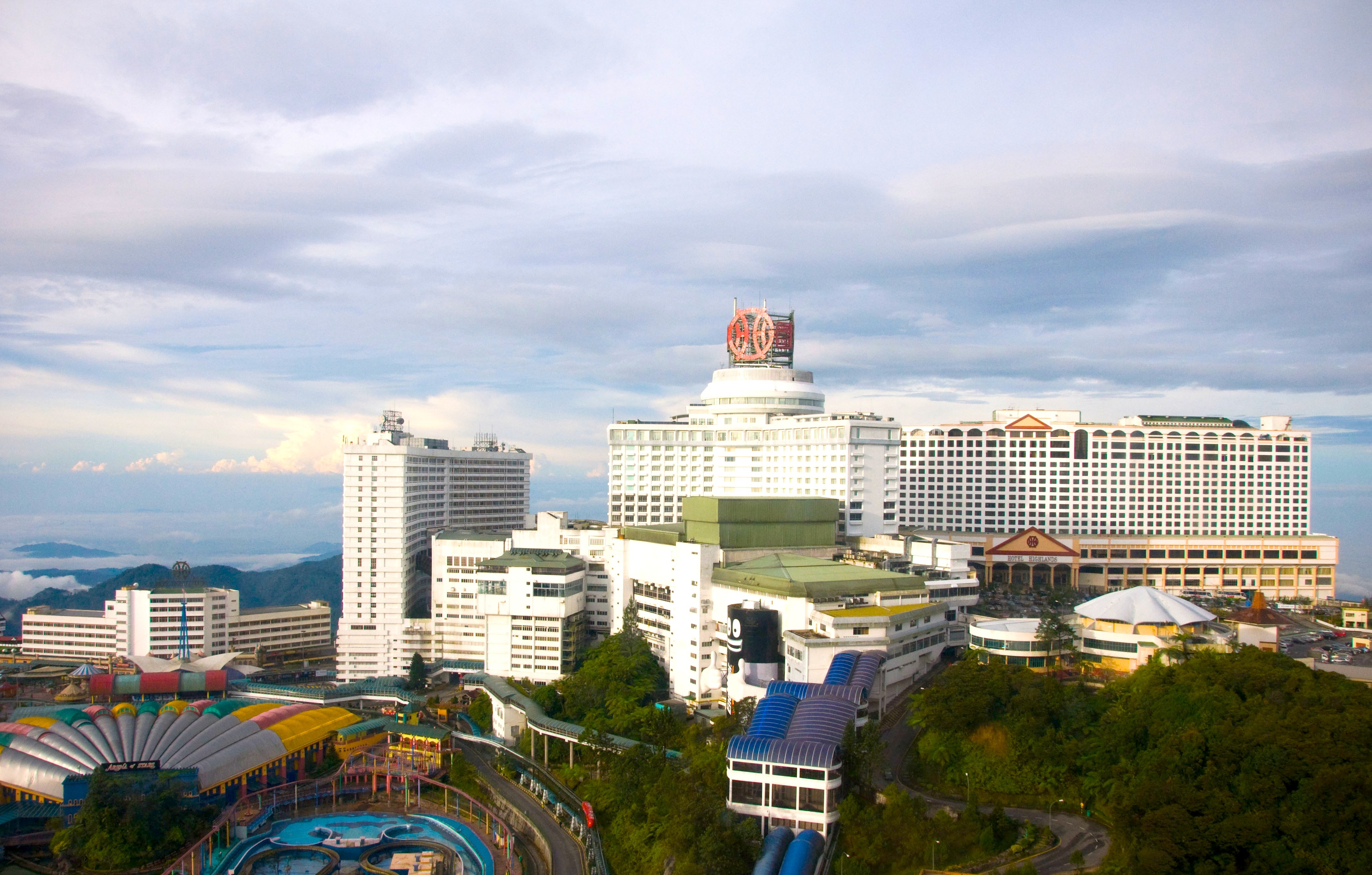
Genting Highlands located at Bentong District.

Bentong District is a district located in western Pahang, Malaysia. Bentong covers an area of 1,831 km^{2} and includes the hill resorts of Genting Highlands and Bukit Tinggi. It is located 80 km northeast of Kuala Lumpur, just across the main range, Titiwangsa Mountains. The eponymous town of Bentong is the seat of the district. The district of Bentong is also further divided into 3 mukims (sub-districts), they are Bentong, Sabai and Pelangai. It is bordered by Selangor's Hulu Langat, Gombak and Hulu Selangor Districts on the west, the Negri district of Jelebu on the south, Bera District on the southeast, Temerloh District to its east, and Raub District to its north.

== History ==
In the beginning, Bentong subdistrict was under the administration of district of Raub District. The administration was separated in 1919 due to the large size of the district. The district covers an area of 183,112.35 hectares. It is located northeast of Kuala Lumpur, just across the main mountain range, Titiwangsa Mountains. The seat of the district is the town of The original main street going into Bentong town has been modified to a dual carriageway. However, the part of the road which leads to Raub and Kuala Lipis had been upgraded.

Bentong is administered by Bentong Municipal Council and is one of the fastest-growing towns in Pahang. It is similar in size to Raub. Bentong has many light and medium industries, including timber factories, food industries and electronic components assembly factory. It also has one multinational copper wire factory which is the biggest in the country.

== Administration ==
Map of Bentong District.

Bentong District is divided into 3 mukims which are:

- Bentong (68,904 Ha) (Capital)
- Sabai (57,157 Ha)
- Pelangai (57,058 Ha)

Other than modern housing area, there are 55 traditional villages, 8 FELDA villages, 15 newer villages, and 14 native villages.

== Demographics ==
Historical population
Year	Pop.	±%
1991	83,965	—
2000	96,689	+15.2%
2010	114,397	+18.3%
2020	168,960	+47.7%

The following is based on Department of Statistics Malaysia 2019 census.

Ethnic groups in Bentong District, 2019 census
Ethnicity	Population	Percentage
Bumiputera	71,000	57.2%
Chinese	44,000	33.4%
Indian	19,000	9.0%
Others	1,000	0.3%
Total	135,000	100%

== Infrastructure ==
About 98% of Bentong district's water supply come from PAIP (Pengurusan Air Pahang Berhad / Pahang Water Management), in which daily water production for Bentong district totalled 4.5 litres per gallon per day while the local residents use an estimated 8.7 thousand gallons per day. Most places in the district have access to electricity, having 4 main electricity transformers with combined capacities up to 90 megavolt-amperes. TM (Telekom Malaysia) provides Bentong district residents with 6,207 units of household telephones, 1,092 units of business premises telephones and 125 unit of public phones.

== Transport ==
In general, Bentong district's paved roads totalled 837.26 km, comprising 311.22 km of federal roads, 224.51 km of state roads, 124.05 km of urban roads, and 177.48 km of FELDA roads.

Three major routes – 8, E8 and 68 converge at Bentong. Bentong is the eastern end of the old Gombak–Bentong road (Federal Route 68). Federal Route 8 begins in Bentong and goes up all the way to Kota Bharu in Kelantan. The Karak Highway, part of the East Coast Expressway is the main link to Kuala Lumpur as well as the state capital Kuantan.

Motorists from Negeri Sembilan and Malacca that wish to enter Pahang while bypassing the Klang Valley will usually opt for Federal Route 9 which interchanges with the East Coast Expressway in Karak in the eastern part of Bentong constituency.

In terms of public transportation, Bentong is not served by the KTM rail network. There though are buses serving downtown Bentong (through Hentian Raya Bentong) as well as Genting Highlands (which is part of Bentong constituency).

== Shopping malls ==
=== Genting Highlands ===
- First World Plaza
- Sky Avenue

== Education ==
There are 49 primary schools, which include national schools, Chinese-medium schools and Indian-medium schools, in Bentong district, with overall 12,272 students and 869 teachers. As for secondary schools, there are 14 of them including vocational and technical schools, with overall 9,901 students and 755 teachers. There are also four government universities and a private university.

== Services ==
Bentong District Hospital, now a Minor Specialist Hospital, is located in the town of Bentong and houses 152 beds. There are 22 health clinics including 19 rural clinics for health promotion and disease prevention. There are 6 government dental clinics, 22 private GP clinics and 3 private dental clinics.

There are also seven police stations and nine police hubs in the district, with a manpower of 355 policemen, and three fire stations with 111 personnel.

== Politics ==
=== Federal Parliament and State Assembly seats ===
Bentong district representative in the Federal Parliament (Dewan Rakyat)

Parliament	Seat Name	Member of Parliament	Party
P89	Bentong	Young Syefura Othman	Pakatan Harapan (DAP)

List of Bentong district representatives in the State Legislative Assembly (Dewan Undangan Negeri)

Parliament	State	Seat Name	State Assemblyman	Party
P89	N33	Bilut	Lee Chin Chen	Pakatan Harapan (DAP)
P89	N34	Ketari	Su Keong Siong	Pakatan Harapan (DAP)
P89	N35	Sabai	Arumugam Verappa Pillai	Barisan Nasional (MIC)
P89	N36	Pelangai	Amizar Abu Adam	Barisan Nasional (UMNO)
