= Batu Caves (town) =

Town in Gombak, Selangor, Malaysia

Batu Caves 峇都喼 (Chinese), பத்துமலை (Tamil)
- Town
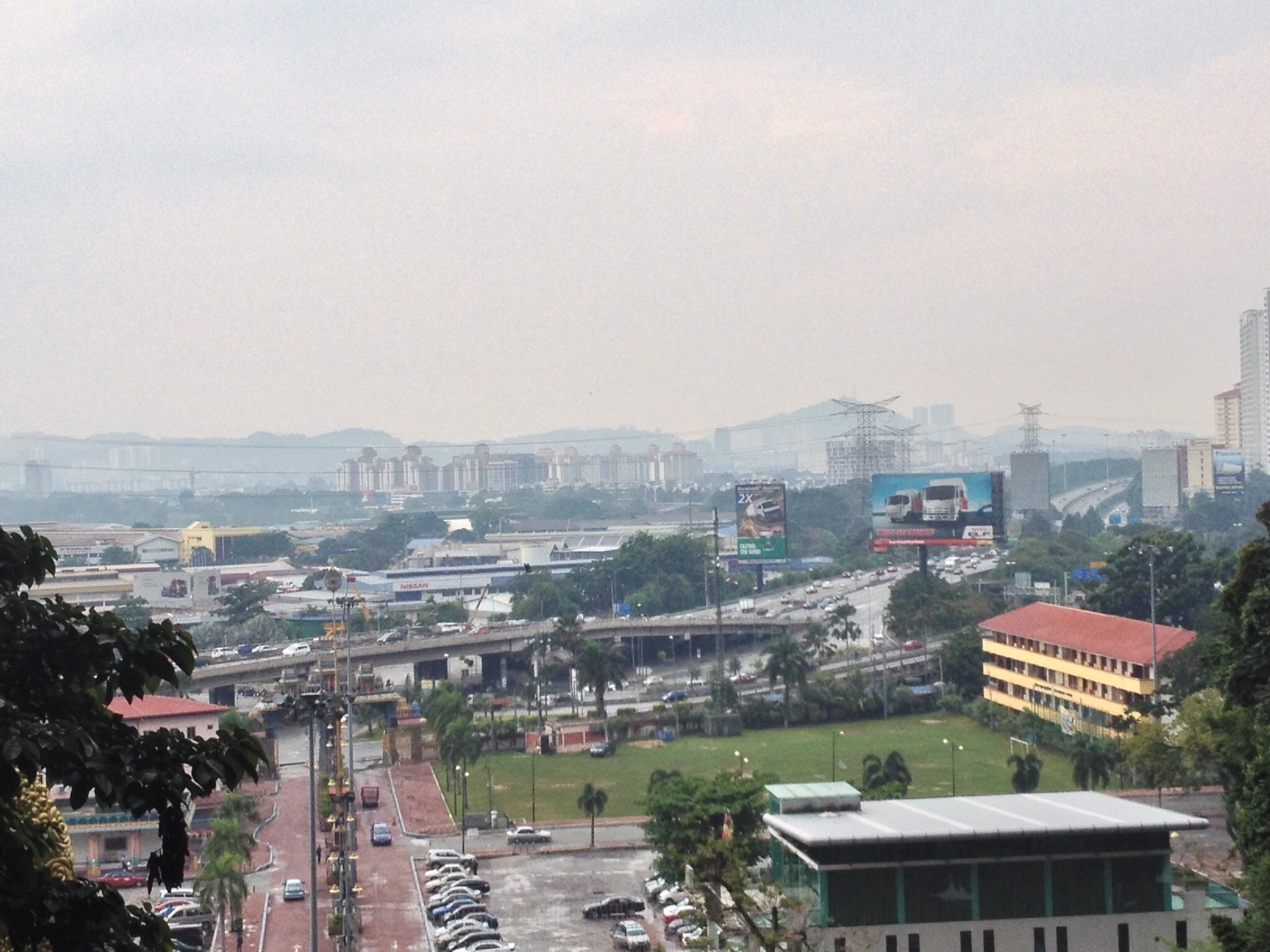
- Batu Caves
- Interactive map of Batu Caves
- Coordinates: 3°14′N 101°40′E
- Country: Malaysia
- State: Selangor
- District: Gombak District

Batu Caves (Chinese: 峇都喼, Tamil: பத்துமலை) is a mukim and town in Gombak District, Selangor, Malaysia. Named after the limestone caves and Hindu shrine Batu Caves, the town is experiencing an increase in residences due to a housing boom in the center of the city.

== History ==
A Giant outlet opened in 2003 and closed on 11 January 2025 due to end of lease period.

== Townships and villages ==
- Taman Jasa
- Taman Pinggiran Batu Caves
- Taman Industri Bolton
- Kampung Indian Settlement
- Taman Amaniah
- Taman Batu Caves
- Taman Selasih
- Taman Samudera
- Taman Desa Bakti
- Taman Desa Minang
- Taman Ehsan
- Taman Koperasi Polis
- Astana Gemilang
- Perkampungan Melayu Seri Gombak
- Taman Selayang
- Taman Seri Selayang
- Kampung Melayu
- Kampung Baru Batu Caves
- Kampung Laksamana
- Kampung Nakhoda
- Kampung Bendahara
- Kampung Lalat
- Kampung Sungai Kertas
- Kampung Datuk Karim
- Taman Gombak Permai
- Selayang Mulia
- Selayang Mutiara
- Kampung Melayu Sri Wira Damai

== Places of Worships ==
- Batu Caves temple
- Tiong Yee Temple (忠义庙)
- Chee Choy Kong Temple (自在宫)
- Xian Fa Shi Gong Temple (仙法师公古庙)
- Al-Amaniah Mosque
- Surau Al-Kahfi
- Surau Al-Ubudiah
- Masjid Al-Khairiyah
- Surau Al-Ikhwan

== Education ==
The housing boom in the town has led more residents to move into the town and led to the need for more new schools.

=== Kindergartens ===
- Private
  - Tadika Setia Kasih
  - Tadika Disney
  - Tadika Islam Sayidina Abu-Bakar As-Siddiq
  - 3Q MRC Junior Taman Sri Gombak
- Public
  - Tabika Kemas Perkampungan Melayu
  - Tabika Kemas Taman Seri Gombak

=== Primary schools ===
Currently, there are only six primary schools in the town.

- Public
  - Sekolah Kebangsaan Taman Seri Gombak
  - Sekolah Kebangsaan Taman Seri Gombak 2
  - Sekolah Kebangsaan Taman Samudera
  - Sekolah Kebangsaan Taman Selasih
  - Sekolah Jenis Kebangsaan (Tamil) Batu Caves
  - Sekolah Rendah Kebangsaan Taman Selayang (1)
  - Sekolah Rendah Kebangsaan Taman Selayang (2)
  - Sekolah Rendah Islam Saidina Abu Bakar As-Siddiq

=== Secondary schools ===
- Public
  - Sekolah Menengah Kebangsaan Seri Gombak
  - Sekolah Menengah Kebangsaan Hillcrest
  - Sekolah Menengah Taman Selayang
  - Sekolah Menengah Seri Selayang

== Current developments ==
Several new business centre have opened at the town heart and have raised the overall land-value. The development of the new-mosque has boosted the land-value of the surrounding area at Taman Sri Gombak near the Tasik Taman Seri Gombak besides simplify the citizens and students to go to mosque for pray.

== Gallery ==
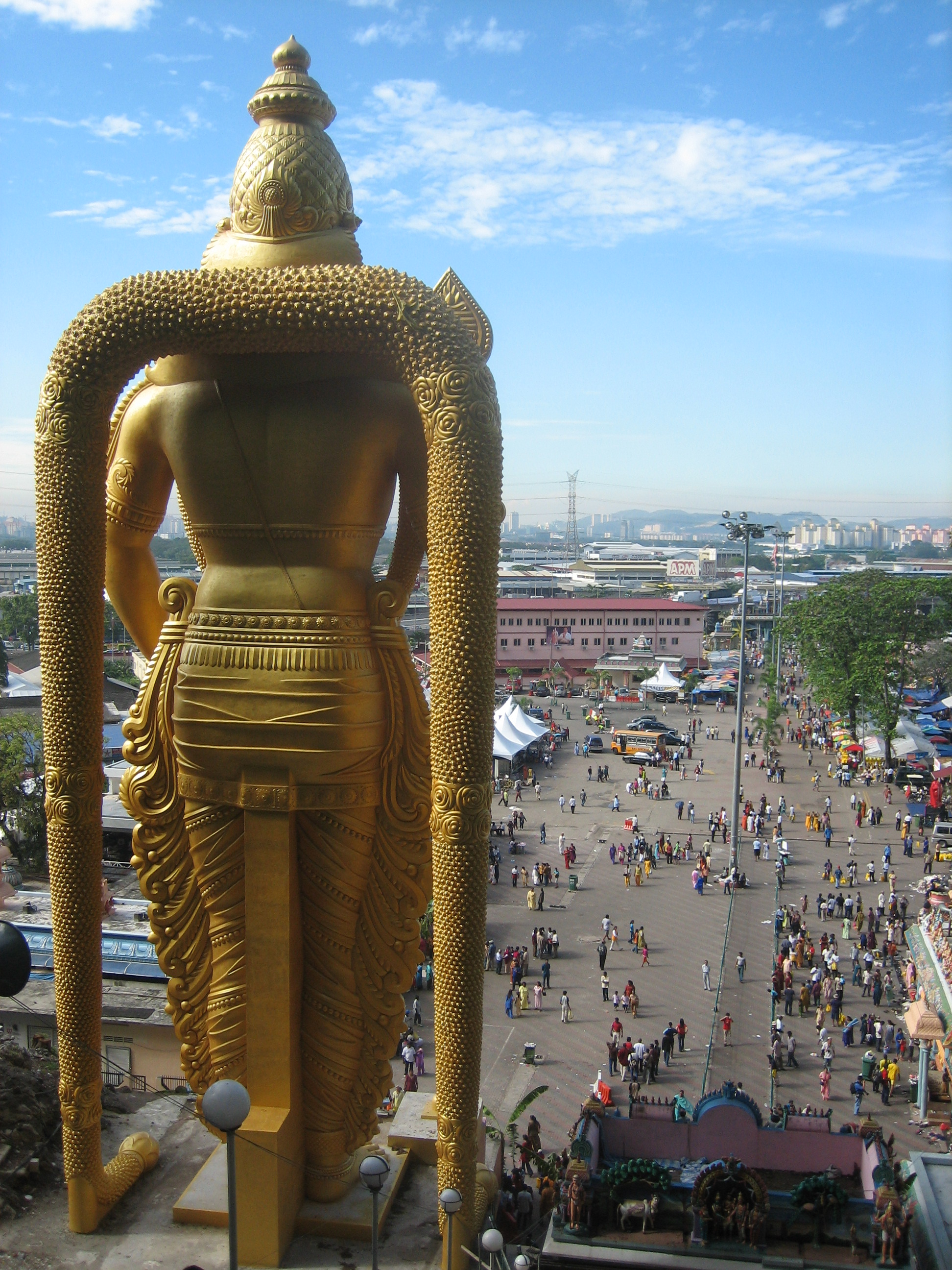
Batu Caves temple as seen from Lord Murugan statue

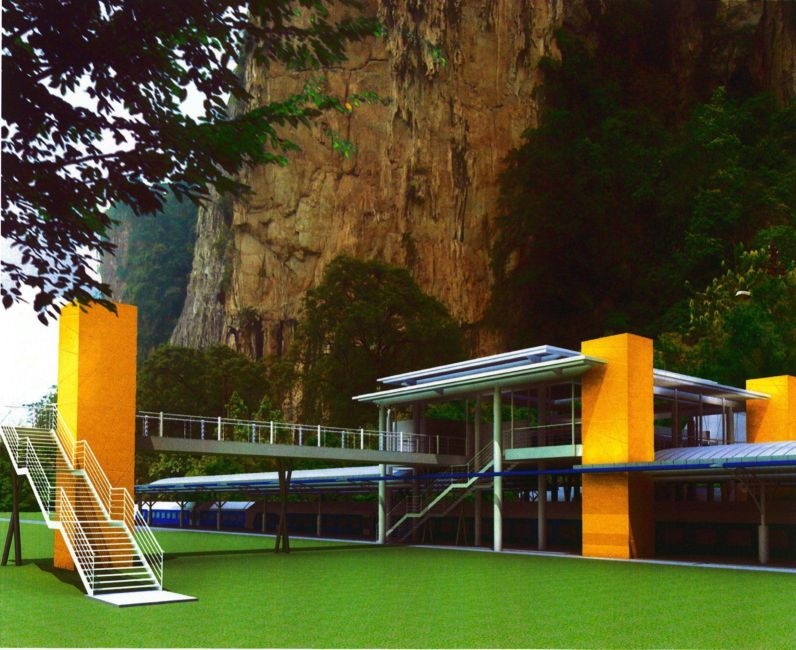
Batu Caves train station that is expected to be developed soon

== Transportation ==
=== Public transport ===
The main rail station serving Batu Caves is the Batu Caves Komuter station, opened in 2010 as part of the refurbishment of the Sentul-Batu Caves branch line. The station is on the Batu Caves-Pulau Sebang Line.

RapidKL and Selangor Omnibus buses serve this town.

=== Car ===
Batu Caves is located right next to the MRR2 Federal Route 28. The interchanges to East Coast Expressway (which goes to Kuantan and Kuala Terengganu) and Duta–Ulu Klang Expressway (which leads to Mont Kiara and Segambut) are located nearby.

== Politics ==
Batu Caves is part of the Gombak parliamentary constituency, currently represented by Amirudin Shari of Parti Keadilan Rakyat. Batu Caves is covered by the Sungai Tua constituency in the Selangor State Legislative Assembly, currently represented by Amirudin Shari of Parti Keadilan Rakyat. He is also the current Menteri Besar of Selangor.
