= Selangor State Route B22 =

Road in Malaysia

Selangor Route 22

Major junctions
- West end: Selayang on Kuala Lumpur–Rawang Highway
- FT 1 Kuala Lumpur–Rawang Highway; B23 State Route B23; FT 28 Kuala Lumpur Middle Ring Road 2 Duta–Ulu Klang Expressway / AH141; FT 68 Federal Route 68
- East end: Gombak

Location
- Country: Malaysia
- Primary destinations: Ulu Yam, Sungai Tua, Batu Caves, Taman Greenwood

Highway system
- Highways in Malaysia; Expressways; Federal; State

Selangor State Route B22, Jalan Batu Caves is a major road in Klang Valley region, Selangor, Malaysia. The road connects Selayang in the west to Gombak in the east, passing by Batu Caves. During Thaipusam every year, the road is closed to all traffic for the procession from Sri Mahamariamman Temple in Kuala Lumpur.

== Batu Caves spiral bridge ==
The road used to have a level crossing with the Sentul–Batu Caves railway branch line. As part of the KTM railway double-tracking and electrification project, and the extension of the KTM Komuter service to Batu Caves, the level crossing was eliminated by building a spiral bridge across the railway. Construction began in 2007 and was completed in 2009.

== Junction lists ==
The entire route is located in Gombak District, Selangor.

Legend:

- I/C - Interchange, I/S - Intersection, RSA - Rest and service area, OBR - Overhead bridge restaurant, R/R - Restaurant and rest plaza, L/B - Layby, V/P - Vista point, TN - tunnel, T/P - Toll plaza, BR - Bridge
- C - Cloverleaf, S - Stack, T-A - Trumpet-A, T-B - Trumpet-B, DT - Directional-T/Y, SDT - Semi-Directional-T/Y, P-Y - Partial-Y, D - Diamond, P-C - Partial cloverleaf, D-D - Diverging diamond, D-R - Direct ramp

Location	km	mi	Name	Destinations	Notes
Selayang			Kuala Lumpur–Rawang Highway	FT 1 Kuala Lumpur–Rawang Highway – Kuala Lumpur, Sentul	From north/To Kuala Lumpur only LILO
Selayang			Selayang-Batu Caves	B23 Selangor State Route B23 – Sungai Tua, Ulu Yam, Batang Kali, Genting Highlands	Junctions
Batu Caves			Batu Caves; Taman Amaniah	Taman Amaniah, Masjid Jamek Al-Amaniah	T-junctions
Batu Caves			Batu Caves; Kampung Melayu Batu Caves		
Batu Caves			Batu Caves; Taman Batu Caves	Kampung Dato' Karim, Kampung Indian Settlement	T-junctions
Batu Caves			Sungai Batu Bridge		
Batu Caves			Batu Caves Komuter station	Jalan Station – Batu Caves Komuter station KTM Komuter	T-junctions
Batu Caves			Batu Caves spiral bridge Railway crossing bridge		
Batu Caves			Batu Caves Hindu Temple Complex	Batu Caves Hindu Temple Complex – Batu Caves Stairs, Hindu Shrine, Lord Muruga Statue (Tallest Hindu statue in the world), Flower shops V	
Batu Caves			Batu Caves-MRR2	FT 28 Kuala Lumpur Middle Ring Road 2 – Kuala Lumpur, Ipoh, Kepong, Sungai Buloh, Petaling Jaya; Jalan Perusahaan – Batu Caves Industrial Area	Diamond interchange
Batu Caves			Batu Caves–Greenwood see also FT 28 Kuala Lumpur Middle Ring Road 2		
Greenwood			Batu Caves–Greenwood see also FT 28 Kuala Lumpur Middle Ring Road 2		
Greenwood			Greenwood-MRR2	FT 28 / FT 2 / AH141 Kuala Lumpur Middle Ring Road 2 – Kuantan Genting Highlands, Ulu Klang, Ampang, Cheras, Kajang, Seremban Duta–Ulu Klang Expressway / FT 2 / AH141 – Kuala Lumpur, Sentul	Multi-level stacked diamond interchange
Greenwood			Taman Greenwood	Taman Greenwood, Taman Selasih	T-junctions
Gombak			Kampung Tanguit-Kampung Simpang Tiga	Kampung Tanguit, Kampung Simpang Tiga	Junctions
Gombak			Sungai Gombak bridge		
Gombak			Gombak	FT 68 Malaysia Federal Route 68 – Hulu Gombak, Bentong, Setapak, Kuala Lumpur	Half diamond interchange
1.000 mi = 1.609 km; 1.000 km = 0.621 mi: Concurrency terminus; Incomplete access
