= Selangor State Route B23 =

Road in Malaysia

Selangor Route 23
- Jalan Sungai Tua; Jalan Sungai Tua–Ulu Yam

Major junctions
- North end: Ulu Yam
- B57 State Route B57; B22 State Route B22
- South end: Selayang

Location
- Country: Malaysia
- Primary destinations: Selayang Baru, Ulu Yam, Batu Dam, Batang Kali

Highway system
- Highways in Malaysia; Expressways; Federal; State

Selangor State Route B23, Jalan Sungai Tua is a major road in Klang Valley region, Selangor, Malaysia.

== History ==
On 1 April 2025, the State Route B23 closed temporary after the landslide for cleaning work.

== Junction lists ==
The entire route is located in Selangor.

Legend:

- I/C - Interchange, I/S - Intersection, RSA - Rest and service area, OBR - Overhead bridge restaurant, R/R - Restaurant and rest plaza, L/B - Layby, V/P - Vista point, TN - tunnel, T/P - Toll plaza, BR - Bridge
- C - Cloverleaf, S - Stack, T-A - Trumpet-A, T-B - Trumpet-B, DT - Directional-T/Y, SDT - Semi-Directional-T/Y, P-Y - Partial-Y, D - Diamond, P-C - Partial cloverleaf, D-D - Diverging diamond, D-R - Direct ramp

District	Location	km	mi	Name	Destinations	Notes
Hulu Selangor	Ulu Yam			Sungai Sendat	Jalan Sungai Sendat – Ulu Yam Bharu, Sungai Sendat waterfalls, SJK(C) Kampung Gurney; B57 Selangor State Route B57 – Ulu Yam, Kuala Kubu Baru, Batang Kali, Genting Highlands; Jalan Kaloi Utama – Taman Desa Kaloi	T-junctions
Hulu Selangor	Ulu Yam			Taman Kelisa (North)	Jalan Kelisa 8B – Taman Desa Kelisa	T-junctions
Hulu Selangor	Ulu Yam			Taman Kelisa (South)	Jalan Kelisa 8 – Taman Desa Kelisa	T-junctions
Hulu Selangor	Ulu Yam			SMS Hulu Selangor (North)	SMS Hulu Selangor (Guard House 2)	From southbound only
Hulu Selangor	Ulu Yam			SMS Hulu Selangor (South)	SMS Hulu Selangor, Pusat Pemulihan Akidah Baitul Iman	T-junctions
Hulu Selangor	Ulu Yam			Ulu Yam Geocache		
Gombak	Sungai Tua			Sungai Tua Recreational Forest	Sungai Tua Recreational Forest – Sungai Batu Waterfall	
Gombak	Sungai Tua			Sungai Tua bridge		
Gombak	Sungai Tua			Batu Dam lake		
Gombak	Sungai Tua			Batu Dam	Batu Dam, TNB Kuala Lumpur Northeast Intake	T-junctions
Gombak	Sungai Tua			Sungai Batu bridge		
Gombak	Sungai Tua			Sungai Tua	Jalan Jasa Utama – Taman Jasa Utama	Roundabout
Gombak	Sungai Tua			Kampung Sungai Tua		
Gombak	Sungai Tua			Kampung Sungai Tua Baharu	Kampung Sungai Tua Baharu, Kampung Mahkota	T-junctions
Gombak	Selayang			Kampung Laksamana		
Gombak	Selayang			Jalan Selayang Baru	Jalan Selayang Baru – Taman Selayang Baru, Bandar Baru Selayang	T-junctions
Gombak	Selayang			Taman Selayang		
Gombak	Selayang			Taman Selayang	Kampung Dato' Karim, Kampung Indian Settlement	T-junctions
Gombak	Selayang			Taman Amaniah		
Gombak	Selayang			Al-Amaniah Mosque		
Gombak	Selayang			Selayang	B22 Selangor State Route B22 – Kuala Lumpur, Sentul, Batu Caves, Gombak	Junctions
1.000 mi = 1.609 km; 1.000 km = 0.621 mi: Incomplete access
