= Selangor State Route B57 =

Road in Malaysia

Selangor Route 57
- Jalan Ulu Yam

Major junctions
- North end: Ulu Yam
- FT 1 Federal Route 1 B117 State Route B117; B113 State Route B113; B23 State Route B23
- South end: Sungai Sendat

Location
- Country: Malaysia
- Primary destinations: Batang Kali, Genting Highlands, Batu Caves, Selayang, Kuala Lumpur

Highway system
- Highways in Malaysia; Expressways; Federal; State

Selangor State Route B57, Jalan Ulu Yam is a major road in Klang Valley region, Selangor, Malaysia.

== Route background ==
The Kilometre Zero of Jalan Ulu Yam starts at Ulu Yam.

It provides a panoramic view of Batu Dam lake, Sungai Tua Waterfall and Ulu Yam.

At most sections, the Selangor State Route B57 was built under the JKR R5 road standard, allowing maximum speed limit of up to 90 km/h.

There are no alternate routes or sections with motorcycle lanes.

== Accidents ==
A number of car accidents have occurred on Jalan Ulu Yam in recent years. The road is considered somewhat dangerous as a result of overzealous drivers flocking to the area because of its popularity as a weekend spot.

== Junction lists ==
The entire route is located in Hulu Selangor District, Selangor.

Legend:

- I/C - Interchange, I/S - Intersection, RSA - Rest and service area, OBR - Overhead bridge restaurant, R/R - Restaurant and rest plaza, L/B - Layby, V/P - Vista point, TN - tunnel, T/P - Toll plaza, BR - Bridge
- C - Cloverleaf, S - Stack, T-A - Trumpet-A, T-B - Trumpet-B, DT - Directional-T/Y, SDT - Semi-Directional-T/Y, P-Y - Partial-Y, D - Diamond, P-C - Partial cloverleaf, D-D - Diverging diamond, D-R - Direct ramp

Location	km	mi	Exit	Name	Destinations	Notes
Ulu Yam	0.0	0.0	1	Ulu Yam	FT 1 Malaysia Federal Route 1 – Batang Kali, Kuala Kubu Bharu, Ipoh, Serendah, Rawang, Kuala Lumpur; North–South Expressway Northern Route / AH2 – Bukit Kayu Hitam, Ipoh, Kuala Lumpur, Klang	T-junctions
Ulu Yam			Railway crossing bridge			
Ulu Yam				Ulu Yam Bharu	B117 Jalan Batang Kali – Kalong Tengah, Batang Kali; Jalan Tengas – Industrial Area	Junctions
Ulu Yam			2	Ulu Yam Bharu	B113 Selangor State Route B113 – Batang Kali, Genting Highlands, Ulu Yam hotspring	T-junctions
Ulu Yam				Sungai Sendat	Jalan Sungai Sendat – Ulu Yam Bharu, Sungai Sendat waterfalls, SJK(C) Kampung Gurney; B23 Selangor State Route B23 – Batu Dam, Sungai Tua, Selayang, Batu Caves, Kuala Lumpur; Jalan Kaloi Utama – Taman Desa Kaloi	T-junctions
1.000 mi = 1.609 km; 1.000 km = 0.621 mi
