= Jalan Batang Kali–Genting Highlands =

Road in Malaysia

- 峇冬加里–云顶高原路

Route information
- History: Closed in December 2022; Reopened on 1 July 2024

Major junctions
- West end: Ulu Yam
- B113 State Route B113; Genting Sempah–Genting Highlands Highway
- East end: Genting Highlands; Gohtong Jaya roundabout

Location
- Country: Malaysia
- Primary destinations: Batang Kali, Gohtong Jaya, Genting Sempah

Highway system
- Highways in Malaysia; Expressways; Federal; State

Jalan Batang Kali–Genting Highlands (Chinese: 峇冬加里–云顶高原路), Selangor State Route B66/Pahang State Route C66 is a major road in Selangor and Pahang, Malaysia. It is a second main road to Genting Highlands, Pahang after Genting Sempah–Genting Highlands Highway. The 2022 Batang Kali landslide occurred in part over this road.

== Route background ==
The Kilometre Zero of Jalan Batang Kali–Genting Highlands starts at Ulu Yam.

== History ==
After the 2022 Batang Kali landslide, the roads was cordoned off to all vehicles.

On 1 July 2024, the roads is reopened after the 15 months of maintenance.

== Features ==
- Batang Kali waterfall
- Sharp corners
- Genting Skyway cable car station

At most sections, the Selangor State Route B66 was built under the JKR R5 road standard, allowing maximum speed limit of up to 90 km/h.

There are no alternate routes or sections with motorcycle lanes.

== Junction lists ==
State	District	Location	km	mi	Name	Destinations	Notes
Selangor	Hulu Selangor	Batang Kali	0.0	0.0	Batang Kali	B113 Selangor State Route B113 – Batang Kali, Rawang, Kuala Kubu Bharu, Ulu Yam, Batu Caves, Kuala Lumpur, Batu Dam, Ulu Yam hotsprings, Sungai Sendat waterfalls North–South Expressway Northern Route / AH2 – Bukit Kayu Hitam, Ipoh, Kuala Lumpur, Klang	T-junctions
Selangor	Hulu Selangor	Batang Kali			Jalan Hulu Rening	B114 Jalan Hulu Rening – Hulu Rening	T-junctions
Selangor	Hulu Selangor	Batang Kali			Sungai Batang Kali waterfall		
Selangor	Hulu Selangor	Batang Kali			Sungai Batang Kali bridge		
Selangor	Hulu Selangor	Batang Kali			Ulu Yam bound Engange lower gear		
Selangor	Hulu Selangor	Batang Kali			Police post 3 (Police checkpoint)		
Selangor	Hulu Selangor	Genting Highlands			Start/End of dual carriageway		
Selangor	Hulu Selangor	Genting Highlands			Genting Skyway cable car station	Genting Skyway Cable Car Station	T-junctions with one ramp from Batang Kali
Selangor	Hulu Selangor	Genting Highlands			Gohtong Jaya	Gohtong Jaya – Town Centre, Goh Tong's Villa (Lim Goh Tong's private residence)	T-junctions
Pahang	Bentong	Genting Highlands			Gohtong Jaya Toll Plaza (Genting Highlands bound)		
Pahang	Bentong	Genting Highlands			Genting Highlands; Gohtong Jaya roundabout	Genting Sempah–Genting Highlands Highway – Genting Highlands, Chin Swee Temple, Awana Genting Highlands Golf and Country Resort, Genting Sempah Kuala Lumpur–Karak Expressway / FT 2 / AH141 – Kuala Lumpur, Kuantan, Kuala Terengganu; Jalan Sri Layang – Institut Aminuddin Baki, Sekolah Kebangsaan Sri Layang	Roundabout
1.000 mi = 1.609 km; 1.000 km = 0.621 mi: Electronic toll collection
