= Taman Jasa =

Neighborhood in Selangor, Malaysia

- Neighborhood
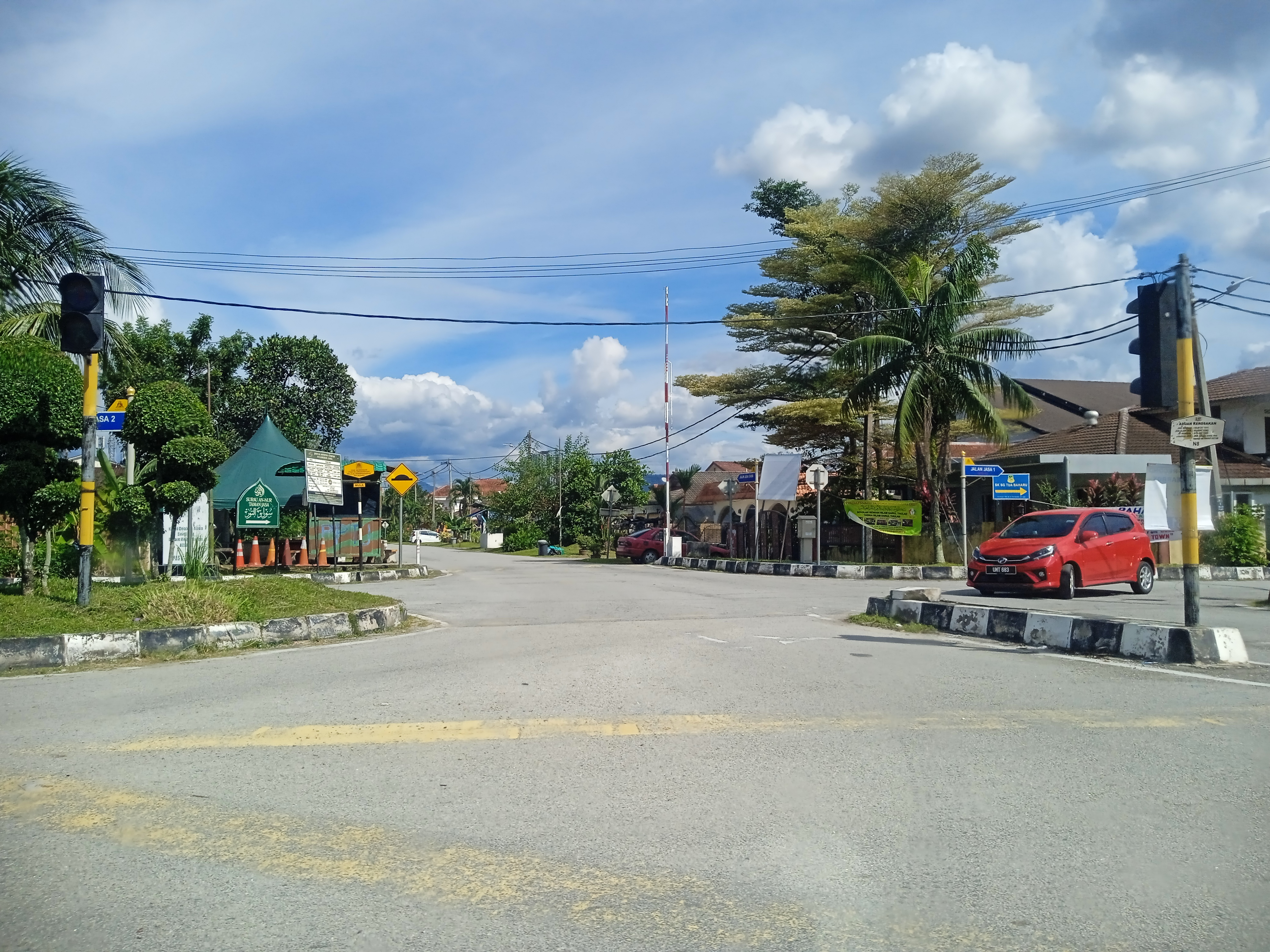
- Access road to Taman Jasa
- Interactive map of Taman Jasa
- Coordinates: 3.256543°N 101.675187°E
- Country: Malaysia
- State: Selangor
- Daerah: Gombak
- Mukim: Batu
- Parliamentary area: Gombak
- State area: Sungai Tua

Government
  - Local government: Selayang Municipal Council
  - Member of the Parliament: Amirudin Shari
  - State Assembly Member: Amirudin Shari
- Time zone: UTC+8 (MST)
  - Summer (DST): UTC+8 (not used)
- Postcode: 68100
- Area code: +603

Taman Jasa is a neighborhood located in Gombak District, Selangor, Malaysia. Administratively, Taman Jasa is a human settlement area located within the administrative area of Mukim Batu, which is one of the four mukims in Gombak District. The postal code for Taman Jasa is 68100 Batu Caves.

== History ==
At the end of March 2023, Pengurusan Air Selangor Sdn. Bhd. (better known as Air Selangor) announced that the area of Taman Jasa was one of 144 locations in Gombak and Kuala Lumpur that experienced unscheduled water supply disruptions. This is due to a valve leak at Warta Lama, Jalan Kuching. The water supply at Taman Jasa is expected to be fully restored on 31 March 2023, at 9.00 am local time.

== Public amenities ==
There is a surau in this neighborhood—Surau An-Nur Taman Jasa. This surau is located under the Kariah area of Masjid Jamiatus Solahiah.
