= Selangor State Route B113 =

Road in Malaysia

Selangor Route 113
- Jalan Batang Kali–Hulu Yam Bharu

Major junctions
- West end: Batang Kali
- FT 1 Federal Route 1 B114 State Route B114; B66 Jalan Batang Kali–Genting Highlands; B57 State Route B57
- East end: Ulu Yam Baharu

Location
- Country: Malaysia
- Primary destinations: Genting Highlands

Highway system
- Highways in Malaysia; Expressways; Federal; State

Selangor State Route B113 is a major road in Selangor, Malaysia.

== Junction lists ==
The entire route is located in Hulu Selangor District, Selangor.

Legend:

- I/C - Interchange, I/S - Intersection, RSA - Rest and service area, OBR - Overhead bridge restaurant, R/R - Restaurant and rest plaza, L/B - Layby, V/P - Vista point, TN - tunnel, T/P - Toll plaza, BR - Bridge
- C - Cloverleaf, S - Stack, T-A - Trumpet-A, T-B - Trumpet-B, DT - Directional-T/Y, SDT - Semi-Directional-T/Y, P-Y - Partial-Y, D - Diamond, P-C - Partial cloverleaf, D-D - Diverging diamond, D-R - Direct ramp

Location	km	mi	Name	Destinations	Notes
Batang Kali			Batang Kali	FT 1 (Malaysia Federal Route 1) – Kuala Kubu Bharu, Ipoh, Serendah, Rawang, Kuala Lumpur; North–South Expressway Northern Route / AH2 – Bukit Kayu Hitam, Ipoh, Kuala Lumpur, Klang	T-junctions
Batang Kali			Taman Batang Kali	B114 Jalan Batang Kali–Genting Highlands – Kampung Kuantan, Hulu Rening; Jalan Meranti Utama – Kalong Tengah, Kalong Hilir	Junctions
Batang Kali			Batang Kali Estate		
Batang Kali			Kalong Hilir	B66 Jalan Batang Kali–Genting Highlands – Genting Highlands, Genting Sempah, Bentong, Kuantan; B117 Jalan Batang Kali – Kalong Tengah, Kalong Hilir	Junctions
Ulu Yam			Ulu Yam Baharu	B57 Selangor State Route B57 – Ulu Yam hotsprings, Sungai Sendat waterfalls, Ulu Yam, Serendah, Rawang, Sungai Tua, Batu Caves, Kuala Lumpur; North–South Expressway Northern Route / AH2 – Bukit Kayu Hitam, Ipoh, Kuala Lumpur, Klang	Junctions
1.000 mi = 1.609 km; 1.000 km = 0.621 mi
