= AMK Baru =

- Campaign: PKR Youth 2014 Election
- Candidate: Amirudin Shari (Chief); Afif Bahardin (Deputy Chief)
- Affiliation: Keadilan Raya
- Key people: Najwan Halimi; Hilman Idham
- Slogan: AMK Baru

AMK Baru was a campaign coalition formed to contest the 2014 leadership election for Angkatan Muda Keadilan (AMK), the youth wing of the People's Justice Party (PKR). The faction was established in February 2014 by Amirudin Shari, then the AMK Vice Chief and Selangor state assemblyman for Batu Caves, one month after he announced his candidacy for PKR Youth Chief. Amirudin subsequently unveiled a 17-member candidate line-up and a seven-point campaign manifesto.

The platform focused primarily on organisational reforms, youth welfare, and electoral readiness. Its core tenets included building a more effective organisational structure across the national, state, and divisional levels, alongside introducing structured leadership training and political education programs. The manifesto also pledged to address youth welfare regardless of political, racial, or educational backgrounds, and proposed integrating student wing elements, such as Mahasiswa Keadilan Malaysia (MKM), directly into the main AMK executive structure. Additionally, the platform sought to strengthen collaboration with youth leaders from fellow Pakatan Rakyat component parties and prepare grassroots machinery for the 14th Malaysian general election. Afif Bahardin, the faction's candidate for Deputy Youth Chief, framed the campaign around an ideology-driven approach rather than personality politics.

Amirudin and his 17-member line-up contested the youth wing leadership in a three-way race against Seri Setia Assemblyman Nik Nazmi Nik Ahmad and Negeri Sembilan AMK Chief Mohd Nazree Yunus. Initial polling indicators showed AMK Baru winning majorities in key PKR stronghold states like Selangor and Sabah, as well as securing strong support in Penang, Kedah, Kelantan, and Perak. However, following several divisional objections and subsequent ballot box recounts, the finalised results overturned the initial tallies, and Nik Nazmi defeated Amirudin for the PKR Youth Chief position.

Despite losing the top post, AMK Baru candidates secured the majority of the youth wing's leadership positions for the 2014–2018 term. The faction won the Deputy Youth Chief post, all three Vice Chief positions, and 16 out of the 20 elected seats on the Central AMK Committee.

== See also ==
- People's Justice Party (Malaysia)
- 2014 People's Justice Party leadership election
