= Mukim Batu =

- (Malaysia) Mukim of Kuala Lumpur
- Location of Mukim Batu in Kuala Lumpur
- Coordinates: 3°12′N 101°40′E
- Country: Malaysia
- State: Kuala Lumpur

Government
  - Local Authority: Dewan Bandaraya Kuala Lumpur
  - Mayor: Mhd Amin Nordin Abdul Aziz
- Time zone: UTC+8 (MST)
  - Summer (DST): UTC+8 (Not observed)
- Vehicle registration plates: V and W (for all vehicles except taxis); HW (for taxis only)

The Mukim Batu is an administrative division (Mukim) located in the Federal Territory of Kuala Lumpur and Selangor. The administrative division was created on 1973, one year before Kuala Lumpur was declared a Federal Territory.

== Locations ==
=== Selangor ===
Mukim Batu is within the Gombak region, covering Batu Caves and parts of Selayang.

Mukim Batu in Gombak region, including Batu Caves

=== Federal Territory ===
Mukim Batu covers northwestern Kuala Lumpur, including the entirety of Kepong and Batu constituencies, and the northern half of Segambut constituency including Segambut town and Mont Kiara.

Mukim Batu in northwestern Federal Territory of Kuala Lumpur
