= Batu Caves Murugan Statue =

Hindu deity statue in Malaysia

Lord Murugan Statue
- Malay: Tugu Dewa Muruggan; Tamil: முருகன் சிலை
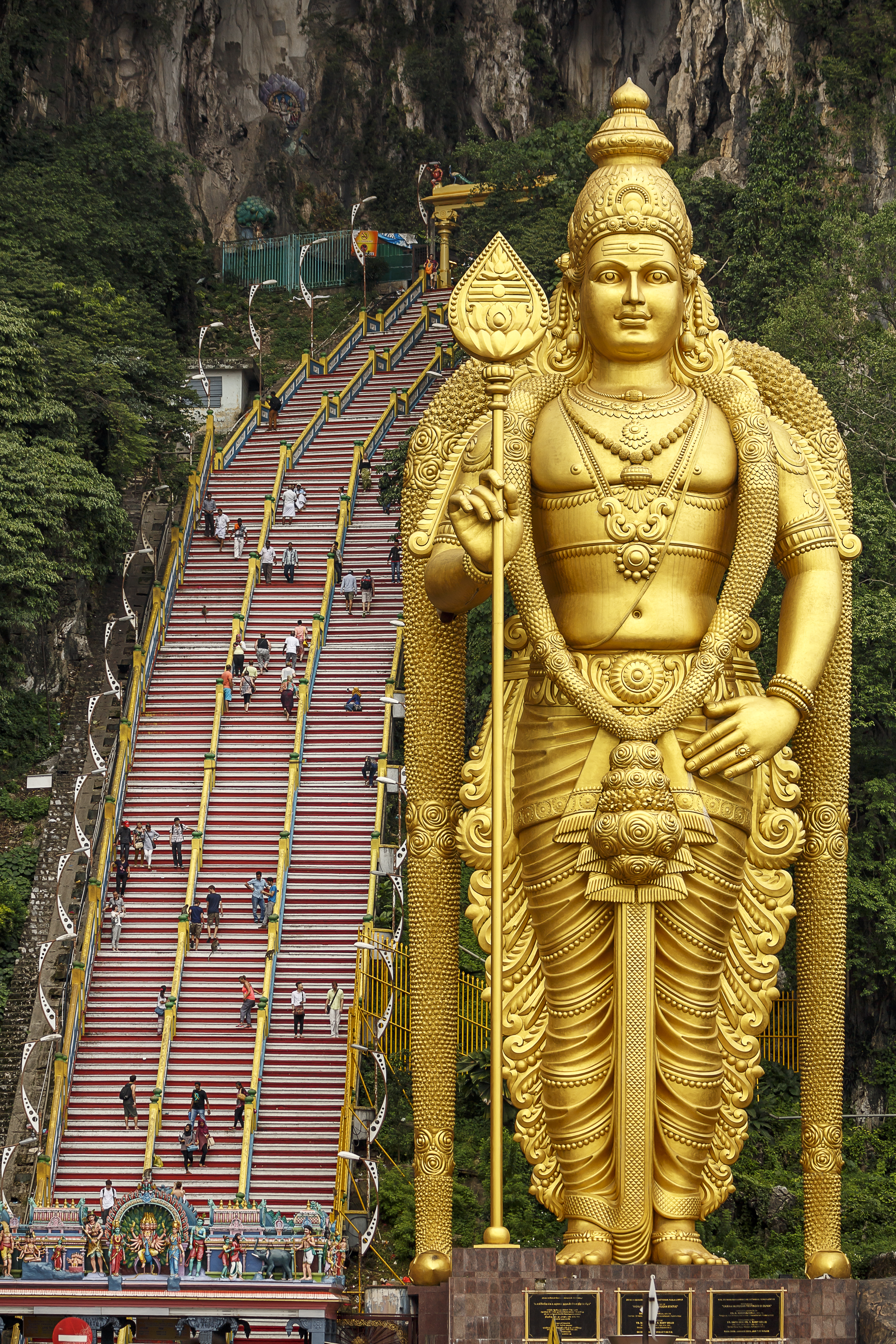
- The statue at the entrance of Batu Caves
- Interactive map of Lord Murugan Statue
- Location: Batu Caves Murugan Temple, Batu caves, Selangor, Malaysia
- Coordinates: 3.2374°N 101.6839°E
- Type: Statue
- Material: 350 tons of steel; 1,550 cu.m of concrete; 300 liters of gold paint
- Height: 42.7 metres (140 ft)
- Beginning date: 2004; 22 years ago
- Completion date: 2006; 20 years ago
- Opening date: 29 January 2006; 20 years ago during Thaipusam festival
- Dedicated to: Murugan

Batu Caves Murugan Statue (Tamil: முருகன் சிலை; Bahasa Malaysia: Tugu Dewa Muruga), is a 42.7 metres (140 ft) tall statue of the Hindu god Murugan at Batu Caves in Selangor, Malaysia. It is the tallest statue in Malaysia and the second tallest Murugan statue in the world (after the Salem Muthumalai Murugan Statue in Tamil Nadu, India).

The statue of Murugan was built by Tamil Malaysians at a cost of 2.5 million Ringgits {INR 19.66 Crore as of 2025} The statue was built by artisans from India using 350 tons of steel and 1,550 cubic metres of concrete. It took three years to construct and was unveiled in January 2006 during Thaipusam festival. It is located to the right of the steps leading to the temple complex and painted in gold.
