= List of massacres in Malaysia =

The following are a list of massacres that have occurred in Malaysia and its predecessors:

| Name | Date | Location | Deaths | Notes |
|---|---|---|---|---|
| Parit Sulong Massacre | 23 January 1942 | Johor, Japanese-occupied Malaya | 133 | Killing of Allied prisoners of war by the Imperial Japanese military. |
| Sook Ching | February to March 1942 | Japanese-occupied Malaya | 70,000 | Killing of ethnic Chinese populations in Malaya by the Imperial Japanese military, following similar actions in Singapore. |
| Jesselton Revolt | 9 October 1943 | Jesselton, British Borneo | 324 | |
| Fourteen Days' War | August 1946 | Peninsular Malaysia | Estimated in 5,000-10,000 deaths of Malays, Chinese and Indians. | During those 14 days, the MPAJA went on a rampage, acting brutally by killing Malays, Indians and Chinese whom they claimed were Japanese secret police. |
| Batang Kali massacre | 12 December 1948 | Batang Kali, Malaya | 24 | Killing of villagers (alleged to be communist sympathisers) by Scots Guards troops. |
| Bukit Kepong incident | 23 February 1950 | Bukit Kepong, Muar | 25 | Armed attack against Bukit Kepong police station by Malayan Communist Party guerrillas, which resulted in the death of police officers and their family members. |
| 13 May Incident | 13 May 1969 | Kuala Lumpur | 143 (official figure, disputed) | Racial riot in Kuala Lumpur following the 1969 Malaysian general election, which resulted in 143 deaths according to official figure. |
| Alor Akar School massacre | 24 August 1969 | Alor Akar | 3 | A 23-year-old teacher at a vocational school in Alor Akar, Kuantan attacked several sleeping students in the school hostel. He killed three students and wounded two others, one of them critically, with a dagger. The teacher surrendered and was later arrested by police. |
| Malaysian Airline System Flight 653 hijacking | 4 December 1977 | Tanjung Kupang | 100 | Hijacking of a Malaysian plane, possibly by the Japanese Red Army. |
| 1985 Lahad Datu ambush | 23-24 September 1985 | Lahad Datu, Sabah | 26 (including the perpetrators) | A group of Moro pirates raid the town and commit robberies and shootings. |
| Memali Incident | 19 November 1985 | Kampung Memali, Baling, Malaysia | 18 | A police raid on Kampung Memali in order to arrest Ibrahim Mahmud and other PAS-affiliated individuals, which resulted in the death of 14 villagers and 4 police officers. |
| 1986 Sabah riots | March 1986 | Sabah | 5 | Seven plastic explosives were detonated in Kota Kinabalu. A bomb was also detonated in Tawau. At least five bombs exploded in Sandakan killing one newspaper vendor and injuring a senior Police Field Force officer. The riots resulted in the death of 5 people. |
| Shooting of Ong Teik Kwong | 1 December 2016 | Tun Dr Lim Chong Eu Expressway, Penang | 3 | Ja'afar Halid, the bodyguard of Ong Teik Kwong shot dead Ong in his car after an argument, and his subsequent attempt to shoot an escaping passenger resulted in the death of 2 passersby and 4 more injured. |
| Darul Quran Ittifaqiyah madrasa fire | 14 September 2017 | Kampung Datuk Keramat, Kuala Lumpur | 23 | Arson attack by drug addicts who had past altercation with the inhabitants of the religious boarding school, which resulted in the death of 23 people. |
