= Batang Kali massacre =

1948 massacre by British soldiers of defenceless men during the Malayan Emergency

Batang Kali Massacre
- Part of the Malayan Emergency
- Hulu Selangor shown within Selangor state
- Location: 3.467°N 101.633°E; Batang Kali, Selangor, Malaya (now Malaysia)
- Date: 12 December 1948
- Target: Defenceless Malay and Chinese men
- Attack type: Massacre
- Deaths: 24
- Perpetrator: Scots Guards
- Verdict: UK Courts ruled that although the Scots Guards had massacred civilians, none of the soldiers would be prosecuted

The Batang Kali massacre was the killing of 24 unarmed male civilians in Batang Kali by the British Army's Scots Guards on 12 December 1948. The massacre took place in Batang Kali, Malaya (now Malaysia) during the Malayan Emergency, a communist insurgency involving the British Commonwealth and communist guerrillas belonging to the Malayan National Liberation Army (MNLA). British author Christopher Hale described the massacre as "Britain's My Lai" in his book titled Massacre in Malaya: Exposing Britain's My Lai.

The massacre was one of a number committed during the war that saw British extrajudicial killings of unarmed villagers in violation of the Geneva Conventions, communist and trade union leaders, and the participation of British military forces in headhunting their civilian and MNLA victims.

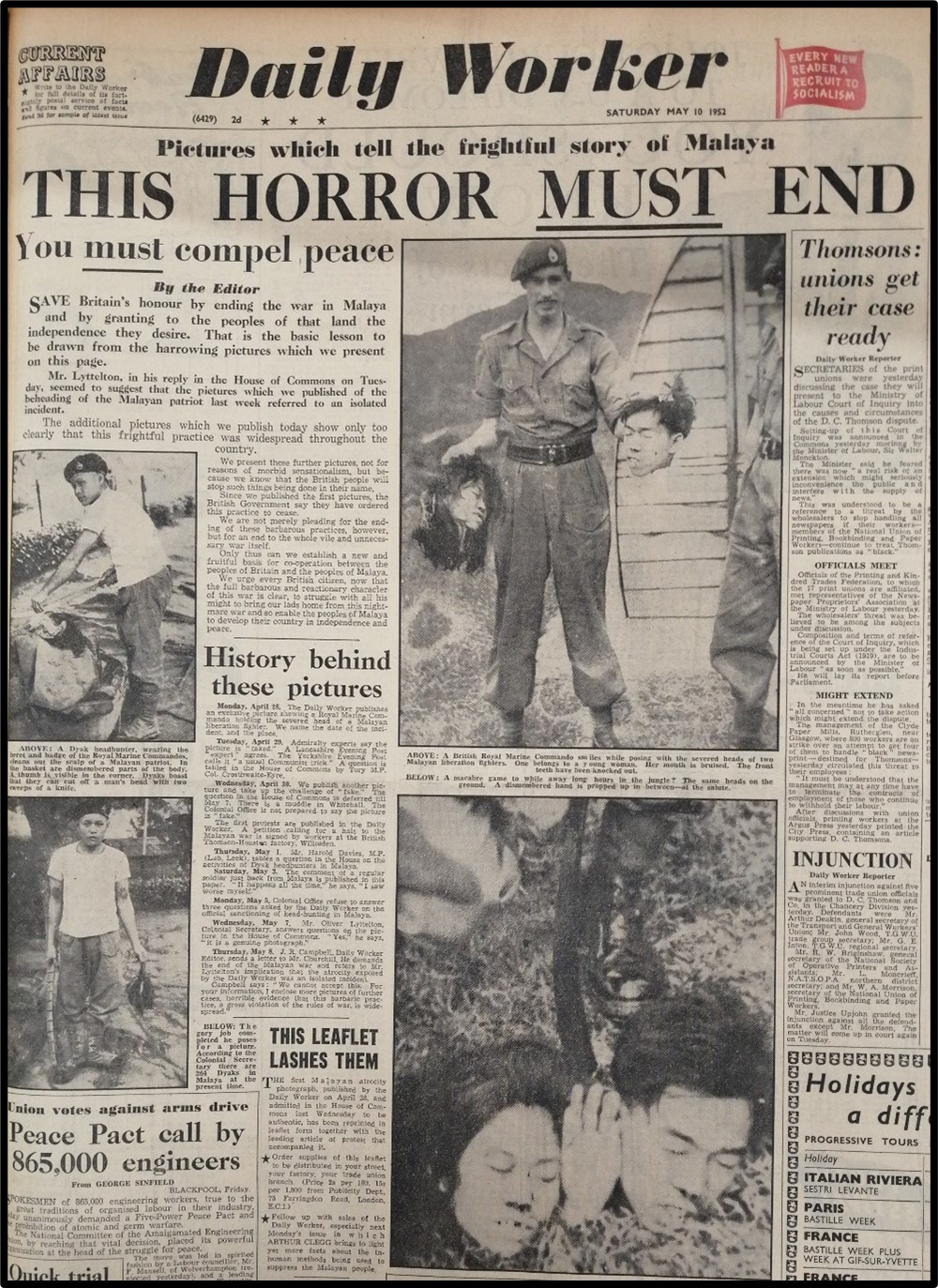
British headhunting during the Malayan Emergency

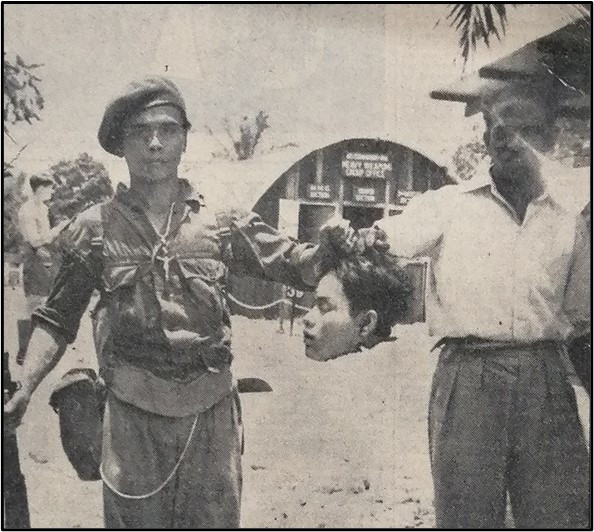
British soldiers pose with a severed head inside a British military base

== Background ==
After World War II, the British returned to Malaya to recover control from Japanese military forces. During the war, the British government had supported the guerrillas who continued to fight against the Japanese forces. However, following VJ Day in August 1945, many resistance units did not completely disband. The groups instead became the foundation for the independence movement against British rule in Malaya. Some guerrillas turned from agitation to communism and began targeting British commercial interests in the colony by attacking rubber plantations and tin mines. By June 1948, escalating violence and the assassinations of several prominent British landowners led colonial authorities in Malaya to declare an "Emergency".

That gave the Royal Malaysia Police and government greater powers and flexibility in combating the insurgents. Although the British had extensive experience in jungle warfare, most recently in the Burma Campaign during World War II, military leaders had not formalized their experience into a specific jungle warfare curriculum.

Training on soldiers' obligations under principles of international humanitarian law was minimal or even non-existent. Basic training for the troops focused on infantry skills, not their ability to judge the appropriateness of orders in the context of the law of war. The specific jungle warfare training included shooting exercises where soldiers had to quickly distinguish between "enemy" and "friendly" targets, but otherwise continued the focus on infantry skills. Michael Gilbert, a member of the Suffolk Regiment, said that his training "[was] teaching you how to march, how to handle a rifle, and how to behave in a soldierly manner." Raymond Burdett, another member of the Suffolk Regiment, reflected on his experience and said that the trainers sought "to get us to follow instructions, not to question commands."

The quality of officers in the Scots Guards at the time was poor, with high turnover, and some platoon commanders resented being sent to fight a colonial war when they had been trained to fight a war in Europe. The patrol that committed the massacre was led by two sergeants, one with little experience; this was deemed highly unusual by its soldiers. Further, the regimental culture of the Scots Guards looked down on patrols, and the regiment's record of successes against the MNLA was poor before the massacre.

At the time of the massacre, no international law existed that dealt with non-international armed conflict. Two years prior to the massacre, the judges at the Nuremberg trials, which were established by the victorious Allies after World War II, stated that "the laws and customs of war apply between belligerents, but not domestically". The 1949 Geneva Conventions included Common Article 3, which is a "mini-convention" applicable to non-international armed conflict and simply prohibits the murder of non-combatants under the physical control or custody of State or non-state forces. However, Britain ratified the Geneva Conventions in 1957, owning much of its reluctance to apply Common Article 3 to its colonial wars.

== Killings ==
In December 1948, 7th Platoon, G Company, 2nd Scots Guards, surrounded a rubber plantation at Sungai Rimoh near Batang Kali in Selangor and shot 24 unarmed men from the village with automatic weapons. The only survivor was a man named Chong Hong, then in his twenties, who fainted and was presumed dead. Other eyewitnesses included the victims' spouses and children, such as Tham Yong, who was 17, and Loh Ah Choy, who was about seven.

== Legacy of the massacre ==
After the massacre, British diplomats introduced Regulation 27A, which authorised "the use of lethal weapons" to "prevent escape from arrest", in an attempt to retrospectively legalise the Scots Guards' massacre of civilians. This new regulation was uncovered within secret documents which had been hidden from public view at Hanslope Park by the Foreign Office. Various UK governments attempted to hide the existence of the massacre by intervening to block investigations into the Batang Kali massacre.

Despite several investigations by the British government since the 1950s, and a re-examination of the evidence by the Royal Malaysia Police between 1993 and 1997, no charges were brought against any of the alleged perpetrators. The British government has never apologised for the killings nor made any attempts to redress the massacre.

== Subsequent developments ==
In 1970, the British Sunday newspaper The People published testimonies by members of the platoon that a massacre had occurred. In response the government referred the matter to the Department of Public Prosecutions, but the investigation was terminated shortly after only a few months due, according to the Director of Public Prosecutions, to a lack of documentation and the difficulty of verifying testimony about an event that had occurred twenty years prior.

On 9 September 1992, a BBC documentary, an investigative report into the massacre, "In Cold Blood", was aired in the United Kingdom and revealed fresh evidence. The documentary included accounts from witnesses and survivors, including confessions of an ex-Scots Guards soldier and interviews with the Scotland Yard police officers who had investigated the case.

On 8 June 1993, with the help of the MCA Legal Bureau, a petition was presented to Queen Elizabeth II asking that justice be done. On 14 July 1993 a police report was lodged by three survivors, accompanied by the MCA Public Service and Complaints Bureau Chief Michael Chong. On 18 September 1993, however, Gavin Hewitt (Head of South East Asia Department of the Foreign Office, UK) stated, "No new evidence has been uncovered by the British authorities to warrant the setting up of another official inquiry into the alleged massacre of 24 villagers in Batang Kali...".

On 30 December 1997, an investigation report was submitted to the Royal Malaysian Police Jabatan Siasatan Jenayah Bukit Aman. The case was closed on the grounds of insufficient evidence for prosecution.

On 13 July 2004, the DAP, a Malaysian political party, raised the Batang Kali massacre in the Malaysian Parliament.

On 25 March 2008, the family members of the massacre victims and several NGOs formed an Action Committee Condemning the Batang Kali Massacre and submitted a petition to the British High Commission in Malaysia. The petition seeks official apology, compensation for the family members of the 24 massacre victims and financial contribution towards the educational and cultural development of the Ulu Yam community.

On 30 January 2009, the Foreign Office in Britain rejected a call for an inquiry into the massacre of villagers. On 24 April 2009, the British government announced that it was reconsidering this decision.

On 30 April 2009, The Independent reported that the British government had agreed to reinvestigate the massacre.

In January 2012, lawyers for the victims and their families were given Foreign Office correspondence and Cabinet Office guidance relating to the incident.

== Judicial review ==
Malaysian victims unsuccessfully petitioned Queen Elizabeth II personally to reopen an inquiry into the massacre in 1993 and in 2004. They tried again in 2008 and failed to receive a reply from the British government until 2011, when the High Court agreed to review the case.

Survivors of the Batang Kali massacre and relatives of civilians executed by the Scots Guards started a legal battle in 2012 with against the British government over the killings. Although many of the Scots Guards who had committed the massacre were still alive, the families and survivors did not seek criminal prosecutions against individual soldiers.

One of the relatives of the victims who shared her eyewitness account was Lim Ah Yin, whose 11th birthday happened on the same day as the massacre. Her father was one of the civilians executed by the Scots Guards, and she noted that the last time she saw her father was when a Scots Guard was pointing a rifle at him and telling him to shut up. A week after the Scots Guards had shot her father dead, both she and her heavily pregnant mother were made to clean up his corpse which was bloated and covered in flies.

“The bodies were covered in flies. They were bloated and swollen, lying in groups of three or four. Finally I found my father. He had been shot in the chest. That day, December 12th, had been my birthday. My mother cried almost every day. She brought me and my sister up. When the baby was born she gave it away for adoption. She only stopped crying when I married and her granddaughter was born. She was 92 when she died."

British courts ruled that although the Scots Guards had massacred innocent civilians and that this was possibly a war crime committed by the British Army, they also ruled that the government was not obliged to hold a public inquiry because the massacre happened too long ago, and that due to a legal technicality nobody could be held legally responsible. This ruling was condemned by various human rights organisations and legal experts who argued that such a decision could be used to justify many historic instances of war crimes committed by the British military.

In May 2012, the judicial review on the British government's position was held at the High Court of Justice in London. On 4 September 2012, the High Court's judges in London upheld a government decision not to hold a public hearing into the killing. It also ruled that Britain was responsible for the killing in Batang Kali. In its written judgement, it said, "There is evidence that supports a deliberate execution of the 24 civilians at Batang Kali."

In March 2014, the Court of Appeal of England and Wales announced it would make a ruling on whether a public enquiry will be held into the killings. The move was welcomed by families of the plantation workers who had died at Batang Kali. The British government had rejected calls for a public hearing, a decision that was upheld by the High Court in September 2012.

In November 2015, the United Kingdom Supreme Court ruled that the British government was not obliged to hold a public inquiry into the 1940s killing by a British Army patrol of 24 Malayan villagers even though it may have been a war crime, because the atrocity was committed too long ago. An appeal to the European Court of Human Rights failed when the case was ruled inadmissible on essentially the same grounds in October 2018.

== See also ==
- British war crimes
- Malayan Emergency
- Jallianwala Bagh massacre
- Bloody Sunday (1972)
- List of massacres in Malaysia
- Mỹ Trạch massacre
