= Kampung Nakhoda =

Village in Batu Caves, Selangor, Malaysia

Nakhoda Village Kampung Nakoda
- Village
- Nakhoda Village (Kampung Nakhoda)
- Country: Malaysia
- State: Selangor
- District: Gombak
- Town: Batu Caves
- Telephone code: +60-3 6xx xxx

Kampung Nakhoda (also known as Nakhoda Village) is a village in Batu Caves, Selangor, Malaysia.

== Geography ==
Kampung Nakhoda is located in the Batu Caves area of Selangor. The village is within the Gombak district.

This village borders Kampung Laksamana, Kampung Sungai Kertas and Kampung Sungai Tua.

== History ==
The history of Kampung Nakhoda is associated with the legacy of Nakhoda Yusof, a Malay historical figure who contributed to the development of Kuala Lumpur during the nineteenth century. According to the Persatuan Waris Nakhoda Yusof, the title Nakhoda was bestowed upon him by Sultan Abdul Samad in recognition of his contributions during the Selangor Civil War and his role in the development of Kuala Lumpur. His legacy is remembered through several place names, including Kampung Nakhoda in Batu Caves.

== Community ==
The community of Kampung Nakhoda is closely connected to Malay cultural traditions, religious practices and neighbourhood relationships. A village profile published by local authorities in 2016 classified Kampung Nakhoda as a traditional village, reflecting its established settlement character. Mosques and surau play an important role in daily life, providing places for worship, religious education and community gatherings. Masjid Jamek Kampung Nakhoda is one of the area's important community institutions. Residents participate in local activities and initiatives that encourage cooperation, strengthen relationships between neighbours and foster a sense of belonging.
