= Kampung Laksamana =

Village in Batu Caves, Selangor, Malaysia

Laksamana Village Kampung Laksamana
- Village
- Laksamana Village (Kampung Laksamana)
- Interactive map of Laksamana Village
- Coordinates: 3.247888°N 101.679315°E
- Country: Malaysia
- State: Selangor
- District: Gombak
- Town: Batu Caves
- Telephone code: +60-3 6xx xxx

Kampung Laksamana (also known as Laksamana Village) is a village in Batu Caves, Selangor, Malaysia.

== Geography ==
Kampung Laksamana is located in the Batu Caves area of Selangor. The village is within the Gombak district.

This village borders Kampung Nakhoda and Taman Gombak Permai.

== History ==
Kampung Laksamana is a traditional village in Batu Caves, Gombak District, Selangor, Malaysia. A 2014 student research project, based on an interview with the village head, reported that the area had a history associated with tin mining and that some of its early residents originated from Hulu Klang.

A 2013 record of proceedings of the Selangor State Legislative Assembly described Kampung Laksamana as a resettlement area for residents displaced by the construction of the Batu Dam.

A district village profile published in 2015 classified Kampung Laksamana as a traditional village and recorded an area of approximately 39 hectares.

In the early 21st century, the area experienced further residential development, including the construction of apartment and condominium buildings. In 2018, the Selangor State Legislative Assembly discussed flooding concerns in the village and the reported filling of a natural lake for housing development.

== Community ==

Community activities in Kampung Laksamana include the Program Rukun Tetangga, organised through the local Kawasan Rukun Tetangga (KRT). Rukun Tetangga is a voluntary, community-based organisation established under the Department of National Unity and Integration (JPNIN) pursuant to the Rukun Tetangga Act 2012 (Act 751). Its functions include promoting neighbourhood cooperation, community safety, social welfare and harmony among residents.

The local KRT serves as a community organisation for residents of Kampung Laksamana. Activities organised by the programme may support neighbourly relations, cooperation and community participation.
