= Ulu Yam railway station =

Railway station in Malaysia

Ulu Yam
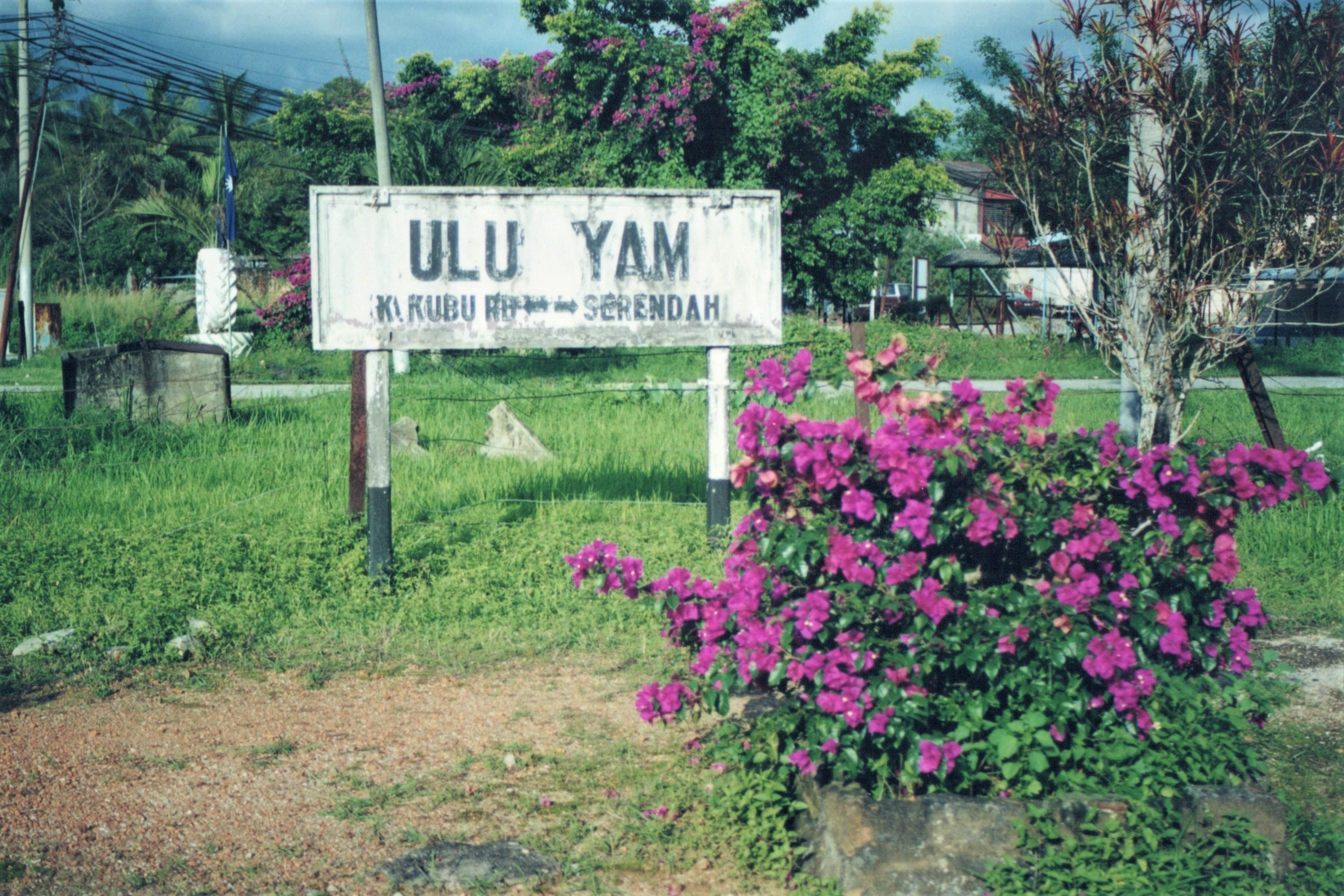

General information
- Location: Ulu Yam, Selangor, Malaysia.
- Owner: Keretapi Tanah Melayu
- Line: Formerly KTM Intercity
- Platforms: 1 demolished side platform
- Tracks: Formerly 2

Construction
- Parking: No
- Accessible: Y

History
- Closed: 2007

The Ulu Yam railway station was a Malaysian train station which is now abandoned. It is located and named after the town of Ulu Yam, Selangor. It was closed in 2007 as it was not part of the Rawang-Ipoh double tracking project and was replaced by the nearby Batang Kali Komuter station.
