= Al-Amaniah Mosque =

Mosque in Selayang, Selangor, Malaysia

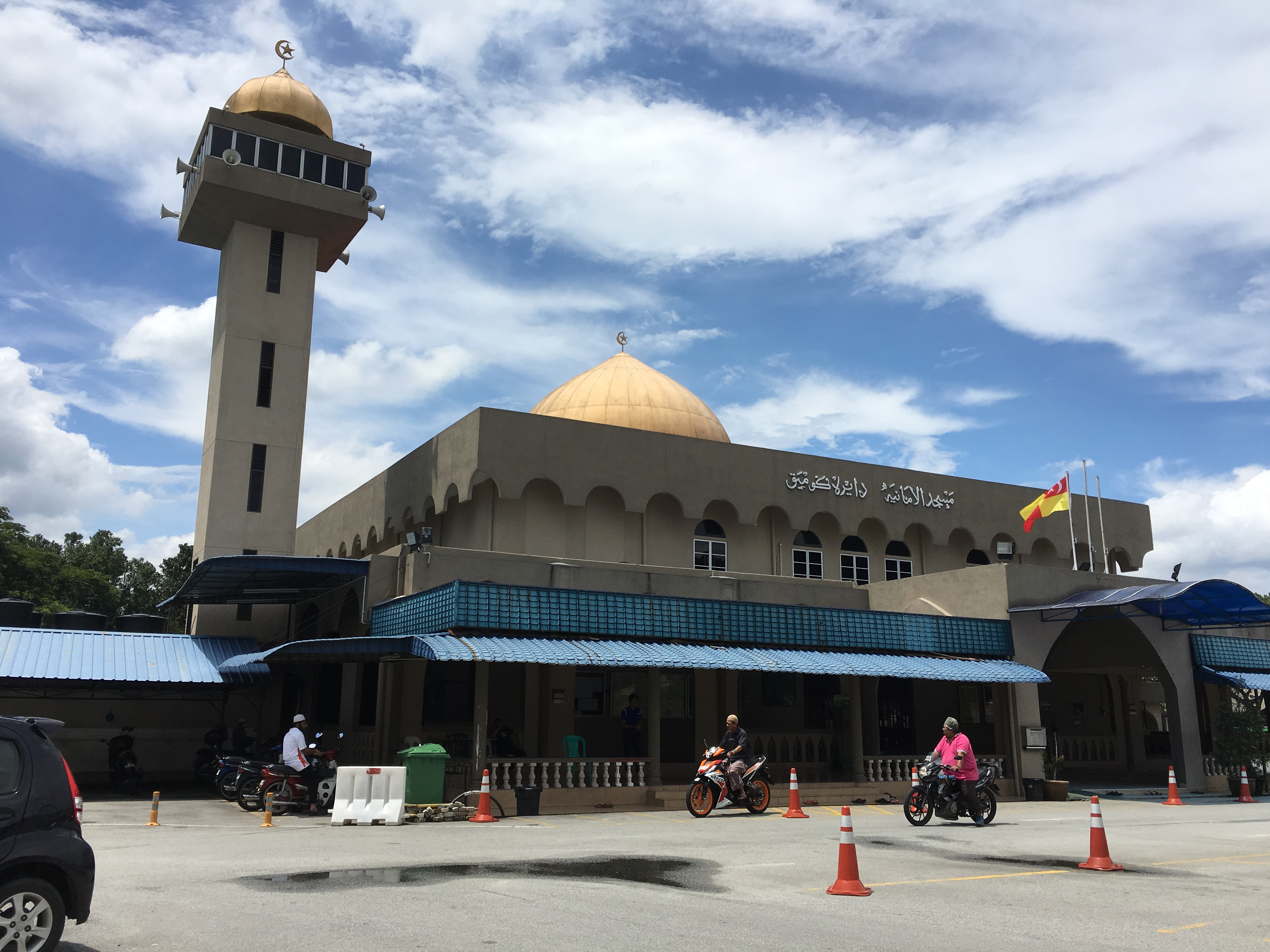

- Location within Selangor

Religion
- Affiliation: Islam
- Branch/tradition: Sunni

Location
- Location: Selayang, Selangor, Malaysia
- Interactive map of Al-Amaniah Mosque
- Coordinates: 3°14′10.8″N 101°40′28.2″E

Architecture
- Type: mosque

Masjid Jamek Al-Amaniah is a mosque in Selayang, Selangor, Malaysia. It is located in Taman Amaniah, in the proximity of Batu Caves.

== See also ==
- Islam in Malaysia
- GoogleMaps StreetView of Masjid Al-Amaniah, Gombak, Selangor.
