= Amirudin Shari =

Malaysian politician

Yang Amat Berhormat Dato' Seri Amirudin Shari SPMS MP MLA
- أمير الدين شاعري
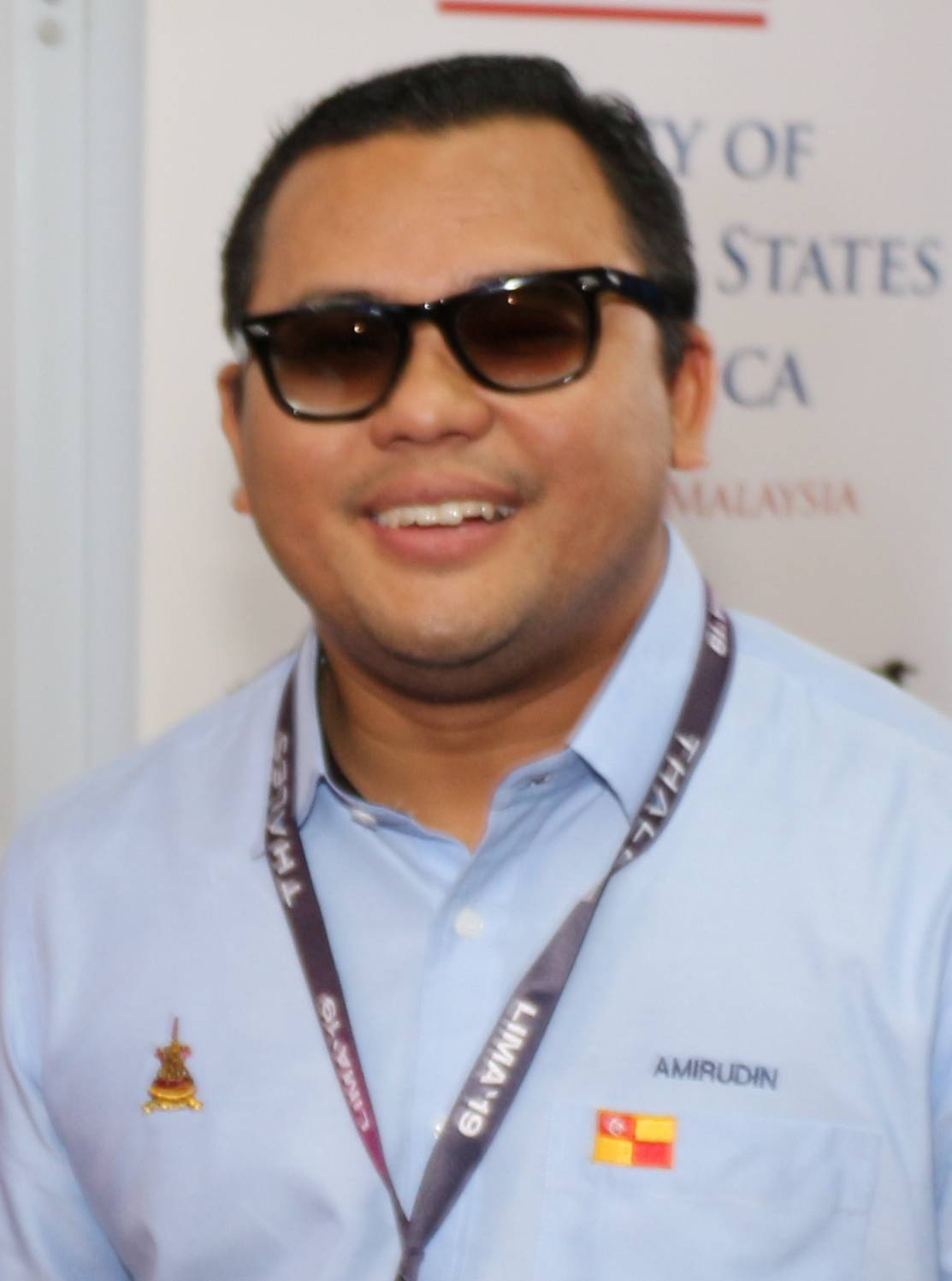

16th Menteri Besar of Selangor
- Incumbent
- Assumed office 19 June 2018
- Monarch: Sharafuddin
- Preceded by: Mohamed Azmin Ali
- Constituency: Sungai Tua

Vice President of the People's Justice Party
- Incumbent
- Assumed office 17 July 2022 Serving with: Chang Lih Kang &; Nik Nazmi Nik Ahmad (2022–2025) &; Aminuddin Harun &; Awang Husaini Sahari &; Nurul Izzah Anwar (2022–2025) &; Saraswathy Kandasami &; Ramanan Ramakrishnan (since 2025)
- President: Anwar Ibrahim
- Deputy President: Rafizi Ramli (2022–2025); Nurul Izzah Anwar (since 2025)
- Preceded by: Zuraida Kamaruddin

State Chairman of the Pakatan Harapan of Selangor
- Incumbent
- Assumed office 6 March 2020
- National Chairman: Anwar Ibrahim
- Preceded by: Mohamed Azmin Ali

State Chairman of the Pakatan Harapan of Pahang
- In office 6 September 2022 – 28 August 2024
- National Chairman: Anwar Ibrahim
- Preceded by: Fuziah Salleh
- Succeeded by: Fuziah Salleh

Member of the Malaysian Parliament for Gombak
- Incumbent
- Assumed office 19 November 2022
- Preceded by: Mohamed Azmin Ali (PH–PKR)
- Majority: 12,729 (2022)

Member of the Selangor State Legislative Assembly for Sungai Tua
- Incumbent
- Assumed office 9 May 2018
- Preceded by: Position established
- Majority: 11,374 (2018); 5,185 (2023)

Member of the Selangor State Legislative Assembly for Batu Caves
- In office 8 March 2008 – 9 May 2018
- Preceded by: Jagarasah Verasamy (BN–MIC)
- Succeeded by: Position abolished
- Majority: 3,639 (2008); 3,261 (2013)

Member of the Selangor State Executive Council
- 2014–2018: Chairman of the Youth Generation Development, Sports, Culture and Entrepreneur Development
- 2018: Chairman of the Youth Generation Development, Sports, Entrepreneur Development, Rural Development and Tradition Villages

Faction represented in Dewan Rakyat
- 2022−: Pakatan Harapan

Faction represented in the Selangor State Legislative Assembly
- 2008–2018: People's Justice Party
- 2018–: Pakatan Harapan

Personal details
- Born: Amirudin bin Shari; 8 February 1980 (age 46) Benut, Johor, Malaysia
- Citizenship: Malaysia
- Party: People's Justice Party (PKR)
- Other political affiliations: Pakatan Rakyat (PR) (2008–2015); Pakatan Harapan (PH) (since 2015)
- Spouse: Masdiana Muhamad
- Children: 6
- Education: University of Putra Malaysia
- Occupation: Politician
- Website: www.amirudinshari.com

Amirudin bin Shari (Jawi: أمير الدين بن شاعري; born 8 February 1980) is a Malaysian politician who has served as the 16th Menteri Besar of Selangor since June 2018, Member of the Selangor State Legislative Assembly (MLA) for Sungai Tua since May 2018 and Member of Parliament (MP) for Gombak since November 2022. He served as Member of the Selangor State Executive Council (EXCO) in the Pakatan Rakyat (PR) and Pakatan Harapan (PH) state administrations under former Menteri Besar Mohamed Azmin Ali from September 2014 to his promotion to the Menteri Besarship in June 2018 as well as the MLA for Batu Caves from March 2008 to May 2018. He is a member of the People's Justice Party (PKR), a component party of the PH and formerly PR coalitions. He has also served as the vice-president of PKR since July 2022 and State Chairman of PH of Selangor since March 2020 as well as of Pahang from September 2022 to August 2024.

He was the manager of the Selangor F.C. football team, leading the team in two consecutive Malaysia Cup finals, in 2015 and 2016. Selangor won the Malaysia Cup in 2015 under his management, ending a 33-year wait. Selangor was also the champion of 2016 Sukma under Amirudin.

During his early involvement in social activism and politics, Amirudin campaigned on democracy, cultural, and students matters. Frequent sessions of open discussion with Komuniti Seni Jalan Telawi (KSJT) were held, with the goal to promote the arts and culture.

== Personal background ==
He grew up in Pontian, Johor. He received his secondary education at Sekolah Menengah Benut in Pontian and furthered his studies at University of Putra Malaysia, graduated with a bachelor's degree in Social Science. He was actively involved in student activism during his campus days and was known as a skilled debater.

After leaving university, Amirudin worked as program coordinator at Institute for Policy Research (Institut Kajian Dasar), a non-governmental organisation (NGO) dedicated to the cause of cultural revivalism and the construction of civil society.

Throughout his career at the Institute for Policy Research, Amirudin carried out the drafting and supervision of social awareness programs including politics with series under his management such as Public Intellectual Forum, Tanwiri Islam Program and also Sekolah Politik, a program that enlightens politics for youngsters.

In addition, Amirudin acquired special training on electoral preparations titled 'How to Do a Campaign' under Konrad Adenauer Stiftung which was held in Berlin and Munich, Germany. These experiences are vital as Amirudin has always been given tasks on logistics, communications, and mobilisation in his early involvement in PKR.

In March 2005, Amirudin married Masdiana Muhamad. The couple have six children.

== Political career ==
=== Youth chief aspirant ===
Due to his active involvement in People's Justice Party Youth's Wing since 2004, he had been chosen as the Vice Chief of the division. On 4 January 2014, Amirudin announced his candidacy for the Keadilan Youth Chief's post with a team up alongside Afif Bahardin in AMK Baru line ups for the upcoming party polls before losing to Nik Nazmi Nik Ahmad.

In the three-way competition, AMK Baru faction led by Amirudin won significant majorities in party polls in popular states for Keadilan such as Selangor and Sabah while receiving good number of polls in Penang, Kedah, Kelantan, and Perak. However, final results showed that Nik Nazmi won the post for Chief of Keadilan's Youth Wing after several branches objected to recounting the ballots.

For the record, the Deputy Chief AMK post, 3 Vice Chiefs AMK, and 16 out of 20 Central AMK Committee Members are won by representatives from AMK Baru.

=== Member of the Selangor State Assembly ===
Amirudin won his first attempt in the electoral campaign in 2008 General Election as a young candidate. He helped the Pakatan Rakyat (PR) coalition, which consisted of People's Justice Party (PKR), Democratic Action Party (DAP), and Malaysian Islamic Party (PAS) defeat the Barisan Nasional coalition for the first time in Selangor electoral history. Amirudin toppled the favourite candidate, Mohan Thangarasu from Malaysian Indian Congress (MIC) with a majority of 3,639.

He successfully retained his position after the 2013 General Election with a win over his contender, Rawisandran Narayanan in a high voter turnout at 85.7% and Amirudin still manages to keep 55.03% popular votes with a majority of 3,261.

=== Appointment as Selangor State Executive Councillor ===
In September 2014, with the appointment of the new Menteri Besar of Selangor, Azmin Ali, Amirudin was appointed the State Executive Councillor in charge of Youth Development, Sports, Cultural and Entrepreneurship Development which was preceded by Ahmad Yunus Bin Hairi. Even before being appointed the Selangor State Executive Councillor, Amirudin was involved with policy making and state programmes for youths and sports. He was unofficially named Vice President of the Selangor State Executive Council along with Ahmad Yunus Hairi and Jenice Lee. They founded together the Penggerak Belia Tempatan (PeBT) (English: Local Youth Movement) initiative together, which engineered many of the youth programmes in Selangor. Amirudin was also appointed the Vice Chairman of the Selangor Sports Council during Abdul Khalid Ibrahim's tenure as Menteri Besar of Selangor, holding the position from 2008 until 2010.

Youth Development

As the appointed youth to represent Generasi Muda, Amirudin continues the efforts to fortify Generasi Muda by launching Ten Fundamentals of Selangor Youth which contains the guidelines and direction of the youth development completely and focusing on major fields. Amirudin also continues Youth Marriage Incentives which give handful of incentive towards Selangor's newly-wed couples.

The existence of Youth Development Department under the wing of Selangor Sport Council also embarks on organized Generasi Muda programs. Penggerak Belia Tempatan (PeBT) has been updated and expanded to involve larger communities. Among the programmes under his tenure, the Selangor International Cybergames was established in the region. E-Sport is one agenda that he lays his eyes upon for building new generation of youth in the interactive world.

Amirudin also launched Selangor Plus Campaign in effort to promote a healthy lifestyle for the youth. As for early initiative, Selangor Plus started from 2015 and persisted until today to fork out the best talent from the youth in futsal, basketball, sepak takraw, and netball.

=== Menteri Besar of Selangor ===
Amirudin was appointed the MB of Selangor following Azmin's appointment as a federal minister. Amirudin's term as MB was marked by several controversies. These included questions raised over a plan to demolish and rebuild the Shah Alam Stadium, the excision and development of the Shah Alam Community Forest, and plans to quarry part of the Bukit Lagong forest reserve. Another issue raised was in Amirudin's own constituency, where land parcels were given out from the Batu Caves reserve.

On 25 May 2026, as a response to reports of abuse against activists of the Global Sumud Flotilla by Israeli authorities, Shari announced that the Malaysian government is preparing to take legal actions against Israel with plans to file a case after lawyers have finished gathering testimony and evidence.

=== Member of Parliament of Gombak ===
In 2022, Amirudin was elected to the federal seat of Gombak defeating his former mentor Azmin Ali.

=== Vice President of PKR ===
In the 2022 party election, he contested and successfully got elected as one of the Vice Presidents of PKR after securing 46,075 votes, thus making him the highest ranked Vice President and third highest position in the party.

== Election results ==
Selangor State Legislative Assembly
Year	Constituency	Candidate	Votes	Pct	Opponent(s)	Votes	Pct	Ballots cast	Majority	Turnout
2008	N16 Batu Caves	Amirudin Shari (PKR)	11,015	57.47%	Mohan Thangarasu (MIC)	7,376	38.49%	19,165	3,639	74.51%
2008	N16 Batu Caves	Amirudin Shari (PKR)	11,015	57.47%	Azmi Hussain (IND)	379	1.98%	19,165	3,639	74.51%
2013	N16 Batu Caves	Amirudin Shari (PKR)	14,552	55.03%	Rawisandran Narayanan (MIC)	11,291	42.70%	26,443	3,261	85.70%
2013	N16 Batu Caves	Amirudin Shari (PKR)	14,552	55.03%	Suman Gopal (IND)	182	0.69%	26,443	3,261	85.70%
2018	N16 Sungai Tua	Amirudin Shari (PKR)	17,446	61.61%	Rawisandran Narayanan (MIC)	6,072	21.44%	28,721	11,374	84.00%
2018	N16 Sungai Tua	Amirudin Shari (PKR)	17,446	61.61%	Mohammad Ibrahim (PAS)	4,530	16.00%	28,721	11,374	84.00%
2018	N16 Sungai Tua	Amirudin Shari (PKR)	17,446	61.61%	Badrul Hisham Md Zin (IND)	268	0.95%	28,721	11,374	84.00%
2023	N16 Sungai Tua	Amirudin Shari (PKR)	19,678	56.87%	Muhammad Hanif Jamaludin (PAS)	14,493	41.89%	34,791	5,185	70.92%
2023	N16 Sungai Tua	Amirudin Shari (PKR)	19,678	56.87%	Suman Gopal (IND)	430	1.24%	34,791	5,185	70.92%

Parliament of Malaysia
Year	Constituency	Candidate	Votes	Pct	Opponent(s)	Votes	Pct	Ballots cast	Majority	Turnout
2022	P098 Gombak	Amirudin Shari (PKR)	72,267	43.69%	Mohamed Azmin Ali (BERSATU)	59,538	35.99%	206,757	12,729	80.01%
2022	P098 Gombak	Amirudin Shari (PKR)	72,267	43.69%	Megat Zulkarnain Omardin (UMNO)	30,723	18.57%	206,757	12,729	80.01%
2022	P098 Gombak	Amirudin Shari (PKR)	72,267	43.69%	Aziz Jamaludin Mohd Tahir (PEJUANG)	2,223	1.34%	206,757	12,729	80.01%
2022	P098 Gombak	Amirudin Shari (PKR)	72,267	43.69%	Zulkifli Ahmad (IND)	675	0.41%	206,757	12,729	80.01%

== Honours ==
=== Honours of Malaysia ===
- Malaysia
  - Recipient of the 17th Yang di-Pertuan Agong Installation Medal (2024)
- Selangor
  - Knight Grand Commander of the Order of the Crown of Selangor (SPMS) – Dato' Seri (2019)
  - Recipient of the Sultan Sharafuddin Silver Jubilee Medal (2026)

Political offices
Preceded by Mohamed Azmin Ali	Menteri Besar of Selangor; 2018 - present	Incumbent
