= Batu Caves (state constituency) =

State constituency in Selangor , Malaysia

Selangor constituency

Defunct state constituency
- Legislature: Selangor State Legislative Assembly
- Constituency created: 2003
- Constituency abolished: 2018
- First contested: 2004
- Last contested: 2013

Batu Caves was a state constituency in Selangor, Malaysia, that has been represented in the Selangor State Legislative Assembly from 2004 to 2018.

The state constituency was created in the 2003 redistribution and is mandated to return a single member to the Selangor State Legislative Assembly under the first past the post voting system.

From 2018, this constituency abolished, renamed to re-created as Sungai Tua.

== History ==
2004–2016: The constituency contains the polling districts of Wira Damai, Taman Jasa, Sungai Tua, Kampung Nakhoda, Kampung Laksamana, Selayang Baharu Empat, Selayang Baharu Lima, Taman Selayang, Taman Batu Caves, Pekan Batu Caves Lama, Batu Caves, Batu 8 Sungai Tua.

2016–present: The constituency contains the polling districts of Wira Damai, Taman Jasa, Sungai Tua, Kampung Nakhoda, Kampung Laksamana, Selayang Baharu Empat, Selayang Baharu Lima, Taman Selayang, Taman Batu Caves, Pekan Batu Caves Lama, Batu Caves, Batu 8 Sungai Tua.

=== Representation history ===
Members of the Legislative Assembly for Batu Caves
Assembly	No	Years	Member	Party
Constituency created from Sungai Tua
11th	N16	2004–2008	Jagarasah Verasamy	BN (MIC)
12th	N16	2008–2013	Amirudin Shari	PR (PKR)
13th	N16	2013–2015	Amirudin Shari	PR (PKR)
13th	N16	2015–2018	Amirudin Shari	PH (PKR)
Constituency abolished, renamed to Sungai Tua

== Results ==
Selangor state election, 2013
Party	Candidate	Votes	%	∆%
PKR	Amirudin Shari	14,552	55.92	▼2.76
BN	Rawisandran Narayanan	11,291	43.39	▲4.09
Independent	Suman Gopal	182	0.70	▲0.70
Total valid votes		26,025	100.00	
Total rejected ballots		418	1.61	
Unreturned ballots		80		
Turnout		26,523	85.92	▲11.41
Registered electors		30,869		
Majority		3,261	12.53	▼6.86
PKR hold		Swing		▼3.43
Source(s) "Federal Government Gazette - Notice of Contested Election, State Legislative Assembly for the State of Selangor [P.U. (B) 192/2013]" (PDF). Attorney General's Chambers of Malaysia. 26 April 2013. Archived from the original (PDF) on 2019-12-29. "Federal Government Gazette - Results of Contested Election and Statements of the Poll after the Official Addition of Votes, State Constituencies for the State of Selangor [P.U. (B) 233/2013]" (PDF). Attorney General's Chambers of Malaysia. 22 May 2013. Archived from the original (PDF) on 2018-10-02.

Selangor state election, 2008
Party	Candidate	Votes	%	∆%
PKR	Amirudin Shari	11,015	58.68	▲13.94
BN	Mohan Thangarasu	7,376	39.30	▼15.96
Independent	Azmi Hussain	379	2.02	▲2.02
Total valid votes		18,770	100.00	
Total rejected ballots		320	1.70	
Unreturned ballots		75		
Turnout		19,165	74.51	▲0.95
Registered electors		25,720		
Majority		3,639	19.39	▲8.88
PKR gain from BN		Swing		?

Selangor state election, 2004
Party	Candidate	Votes	%
BN	Jagarasah Verasamy	9,362	55.26
PKR	Kamarul Baharin Abbas	7,581	44.74
Total valid votes		16,943	100.00
Total rejected ballots		295	1.74
Unreturned ballots		80	
Turnout		17,318	73.56
Registered electors		23,544	
Majority		1,781	10.51
This was a new constituency created.
