= Selayang =

Town in Gombak, Selangor, Malaysia

- Town
- Around downtown of Bandar Baru Selayang

- Seal

- Selayang in Gombak District
- Country: Malaysia
- State: Selangor
- District: Gombak

Government
  - Type: Local government
  - Body: Selayang Municipal Council

Area
  - Total: 549.33 km^{2} (212.10 sq mi)

Population (2010 Census)
  - Total: 542,409
  - Density: 987.65/km^{2} (2,558.0/sq mi)
- Postal code: 68100

Selayang is a town in Gombak District, Selangor, Malaysia.

== Location ==
Selayang is located on the main route to Rawang through Jalan Ipoh, and this route is connected to Jalan Kuching as main Rawang-Kuala Lumpur route. It is also an optional getaway to Damansara by passing Kepong via Kepong-Selayang Highway, which is a neighbouring town to the southwest. A route connecting Selayang and Gombak in the east is Jalan Batu Caves, which is annually closed during the Thaipusam celebration.

== Local government ==
The federal constituency represented in the Dewan Rakyat is Selayang (federal constituency).

Most of Selayang is administered by Selayang Municipal Council (Majlis Perbandaran Selayang, MPS). Part of the town that spills over into the Federal Territory of Kuala Lumpur is administered by Dewan Bandaraya Kuala Lumpur (DBKL, English: Kuala Lumpur City Hall).

The postcode for Selayang is 68100 Batu Caves, including the part of the town located in the federal territory, as postcode areas do not necessarily correspond to state borders. However, to minimise confusion, the postcode for the federal territory part is often written as 68100 Kuala Lumpur.

== Infrastructure ==
Among the facilities and infrastructures accessible is bus transportation provided by Rapid KL and MARA Liner, Batu Caves Komuter station which was formerly the old Batu Caves railway, Majlis Perbandaran Selayang Stadium, the MPS Sri Siantan Sports Center (locating the public swimming pool, locally known as Kompleks Sukan Sri Siantan), hospital, public library, public university and access to the Kuala Lumpur Middle Ring Road 2 (MRR2).

== Development ==
Currently, Selayang is undergoing moderate yet rapid development, notably real properties for residential and commercial.

== Local attractions ==
Alongside developments, Selayang hosts a number of attractions. Located in the northern portions of Klang Valley, on the outskirts of Kuala Lumpur, Selayang serves as a getaway spot from the bustle of the metropolis that is Kuala Lumpur. Popular landmarks include the Selayang Mall and Selayang Capitol (shopping complexes), Hospital Selayang, Selayang Mara University of Technology (UiTM Selayang), Majlis Perbandaran Selayang Stadium, and Pasar Borong Selayang.

=== Nature ===
==== FRIM ====
Given its varied topography pattern and close proximity to the Titiwangsa Mountains (Banjaran Titiwangsa), Selayang is a mix of urban and countryside sceneries. Its premier natural attraction, which is well known across the country, is the Forest Research Institute Malaysia (FRIM), also known as FRIM Kepong. As a leading institute in tropical forestry research, it administers the sustainable management of the forest for the purpose of preservation and research. The institute dates back to 1926. This forest reserve area covers part of Kepong, Selayang (Bukit Lagong) and Rawang (Templer). Home for numerous species of flora and fauna. FRIM also functions as educational and recreational destination well equipped with infrastructures such as laboratory, information centre, sport facilities, a waterfall, river, trekking route, canopy walk, etc. The species are highly protected and visitors could see tags attached to trees displaying the names as well as quite rare animals on ground.

==== Bukit Lagong ====
Bukit Lagong which is the name of the hill covered by FRIM on the northern part is a recreational area in Selayang, storing recreational entertainment for visitors. Fresh water river, jungle trekking, kayaking and camping are among the attractions popular among the locals. Officiated in 2005 by the state's Minister, the Pusat Latihan Belia Bukit Lagong (Bukit Lagong Youth Training Center) opened for school and college outdoor programs, team-building, camping and various other recreational activities, mainly aims toward the development of youth. Alongside the crooked small route reaching towards the camp is a river that flows to Sungai Gombak, carrying fresh water from the hill.

==== Taman Rimba Komanwel ====
Another natural recreational escapade similar to Bukit Lagong is Taman Rimba Komanwel (Commonwealth Forest Park and Resort), located at KM43 on the farther north close to Rawang-Selayang border, in Lagong forest reserve. It is only accessible by using the Rawang-Kuala Lumpur Jalan Ipoh route, about 40 minutes ride from Kuala Lumpur. Taman Rimba Komanwel is more attributed to Rawang town rather than Selayang, though it is closer to Selayang in distance.

==== Selayang Hot Spring ====
Selayang Hot Spring or Kolam Air Panas Selayang is a very popular place among locals, which was discovered almost four decades ago and rumoured "to have cured visitors with illnesses and diseases", such as diabetes, gout, skin illnesses and many more. Though the truth of such claims remain uncertain, numerous testimonies have been received by visitors. There are even visitors who spend time here two or three days in a week, or almost every day after work. One possible explanation could probably be the algae microorganisms living in the springs, but so far there is no proven scientific evidence that conclusively confirm or refute the claims. Nevertheless, the hot spring spot is certainly a destination for city dwellers who seek relaxation and tranquility, far cheaper than going to a spa.

Most of the natural places of attraction is Selayang are in the north, attached to the greenery environment.

=== Other places ===
==== Bandar Baru Selayang ====
Bandar Baru Selayang or colloquially known as BBS among locals is a rather new township. It was opened in 1987. It places the municipal council's headquarters and other important landmarks including the MPS Stadium known among local football enthusiasts as among other venues for important matches in the country's popular football leagues. Many restaurants are located near the stadium. The town becomes very lively when there are games played in the MPS Stadiums the stadium's spotlights illumination pour the surrounding area with a bright beam. The town's pasar malam (night market) opens every Thursday evening and is located behind the stadium where it sells food, clothes and merchandise. MPS constantly maintains BBS to preserve the town's landscape and cleanliness.

==== Pasar Borong Selayang ====
Known among households and wholesale traders within and out from Selayang, Pasar Borong Selayang (Selayang wholesale market) is one of the busiest place attracting people to purchase wet products at cheap prices. The market which previously have the two large hangar-like facility which has since been demolished is located by the road side of Jalan Ipoh near the border between Selangor and Kuala Lumpur. It is an active trading market, selling fishery, agriculture and poultry products and at usually its busiest times are festive seasons which households purchase more goods for celebration preparation. Despite the increasing competition with newly established low price markets such as Tesco and NSK Trade City, Pasar Borong Selayang continue to survive and generally still is the conventional market choice. Open daily as early as 3 am, the market attracts buyers even far from outer Selayang, including Kuala Lumpur and Rawang.

==== Batu Dam ====
Another recreational destination, Ulu Yam, places series of rivers and waterfalls at several points along the Ulu Yam road. Ulu Yam town is located at the north east neighbouring Batang Kali, and drivers would first pass by the Batu Dam, a water supply dam cum family recreation location, well known by the locals. Among recreational sport available in Empangan Batu is paragliding and kayaking and visitors spend their evening by jogging, playing kite or simply cooling down with families and colleagues.
