= Sungai Tua =

State constituency in Selangor, Malaysia

Sungai Tua (N16)
Selangor constituency

State constituency
- Legislature: Selangor State Legislative Assembly
MLA
Amirudin Shari
PH
- Constituency created: 1994
- Constituency abolished: 2004
- Constituency re-created: 2018
- First contested: 1995
- Last contested: 2023

Demographics
- Electors (2023): 49,055

Sungai Tua is a state constituency in Selangor, Malaysia, that is represented in the Selangor State Legislative Assembly from 1995 to 2004, and then since 2018. It has been represented by Menteri Besar Amirudin Shari of Pakatan Harapan (PH) since 2018.

The state constituency was created in the 1994 redistribution and was mandated to return a single member to the Selangor State Legislative Assembly under the first past the post voting system.

== Demographics ==
Ethnic breakdown of Sungai Tua's electorate as of 2018
1. Malay (59.9%)
2. Indian (24.3%)
3. Chinese (13.3%)
4. Other ethnicities (2.43%)

== History ==
=== Polling districts ===
According to the federal gazette issued on 30 March 2018, the Sungai Tua constituency is divided into 12 polling districts.

State constituency	Polling districts	Code	Location
Sungai Tua (N16)	Wira Damai	098/16/01	SMK Sungai Kertas
Sungai Tua (N16)	Taman Jasa	098/16/02	SRA Kampung Sungai Tua Baru
Sungai Tua (N16)	Sungai Tua	098/16/03	SK Sungai Tua Baharu
Sungai Tua (N16)	Kampung Nakhoda	098/16/04	SA Rakyat (KAFA Integrasi) Al-Humaira
Sungai Tua (N16)	Kampung Laksamana	098/16/05	SK Sungai Kertas
Sungai Tua (N16)	Selayang Baharu Empat	098/16/06	SMK Selayang Bharu
Sungai Tua (N16)	Selayang Baharu Lima	098/16/07	SMK Darul Ehsan
Sungai Tua (N16)	Taman Selayang	098/16/08	SA Rakyat (Kafai) Al-Amaniah
Sungai Tua (N16)	Taman Batu Caves	098/16/09	SMK Taman Selayang
Sungai Tua (N16)	Pekan Batu Caves Lama	098/16/10	SJK (C) Kheow Bin
Sungai Tua (N16)	Batu Caves	098/16/11	SJK (T) Batu Caves
Sungai Tua (N16)	Batu 8 Sungai Tua	098/16/12	SK (2) Taman Selayang

=== Representation history ===
Members of the Legislative Assembly for Sungai Tua
Assembly	No	Years	Member	Party
Constituency created from Gombak Setia and Rawang
9th	N16	1995–1999	S. Gopala Krishnan	BN (MIC)
10th	N16	1999–2004	Jagarasah Verasamy	BN (MIC)
Constituency abolished, renamed to Batu Caves
Constituency re-created from Batu Caves
14th	N16	2018–2023	Amirudin Shari	PH (PKR)
15th	N16	2023–present	Amirudin Shari	PH (PKR)

== Election results ==
Selangor state election, 2023: Sungai Tua
Party	Candidate	Votes	%	∆%
PH	Amirudin Shari	19,678	56.87	▲56.87
PN	Muhammad Hanif Jamaluddin	14,493	41.89	▲41.89
Independent	Suman Gopal	430	1.24	▲1.24
Total valid votes		34,601	100.00	
Total rejected ballots		157		
Unreturned ballots		33		
Turnout		34,791	70.92	▼13.08
Registered electors		49,055		
Majority		5,185	14.98	▼25.19
PH hold		Swing		

Selangor state election, 2018: Sungai Tua
Party	Candidate	Votes	%	∆%
PKR	Amirudin Shari	17,446	61.61	▲61.61
BN	N. Rawisandran	6,072	21.44	▼30.01
PAS	Mohammad Bin Ibrahim	4,530	16.00	▲16.00
Independent	Badrul Hisham Md Zin	268	0.95	▲0.95
Total valid votes		28,316	100.00	
Total rejected ballots		277		
Unreturned ballots		128		
Turnout		28,721	84.00	
Registered electors		34,180		
Majority		11,374	40.17	
PKR gain from BN		Swing		-

Selangor state election, 1999: Sungai Tua
Party	Candidate	Votes	%	∆%
BN	Jagarasah Verasamy	7,950	51.45	▼25.71
PKR	Razali Ramli	7,501	48.55	▲48.55
Total valid votes		15,451	100.00	
Total rejected ballots		320		
Unreturned ballots				
Turnout		15,771	74.42	▲3.83
Registered electors		21,192		
Majority		449	2.90	▼51.42
BN hold		Swing		

Selangor state election, 1995: Sungai Tua
Party	Candidate	Votes	%
BN	Gopala Krishnan V. Subramaniam	10,480	77.16
PAS	Azmi Hussain	3,103	22.84
Total valid votes		13,583	100.00
Total rejected ballots		398	
Unreturned ballots		96	
Turnout		14,077	70.59
Registered electors		19,943	
Majority		7,377	54.32
This was a new constituency created.

== Bibliography ==
- "Keputusan Pilihan Raya Suruhanjaya Pilihan Raya". Election Commission of Malaysia. Archived from the original on 2016-04-24.
- "Keputusan Pilihan Raya Suruhanjaya Pilihan Raya". Election Commission of Malaysia. Archived from the original on 2016-04-24.
