= Batang Kali =

Town in Malaysia

Batang Kali, Selangor
- Town
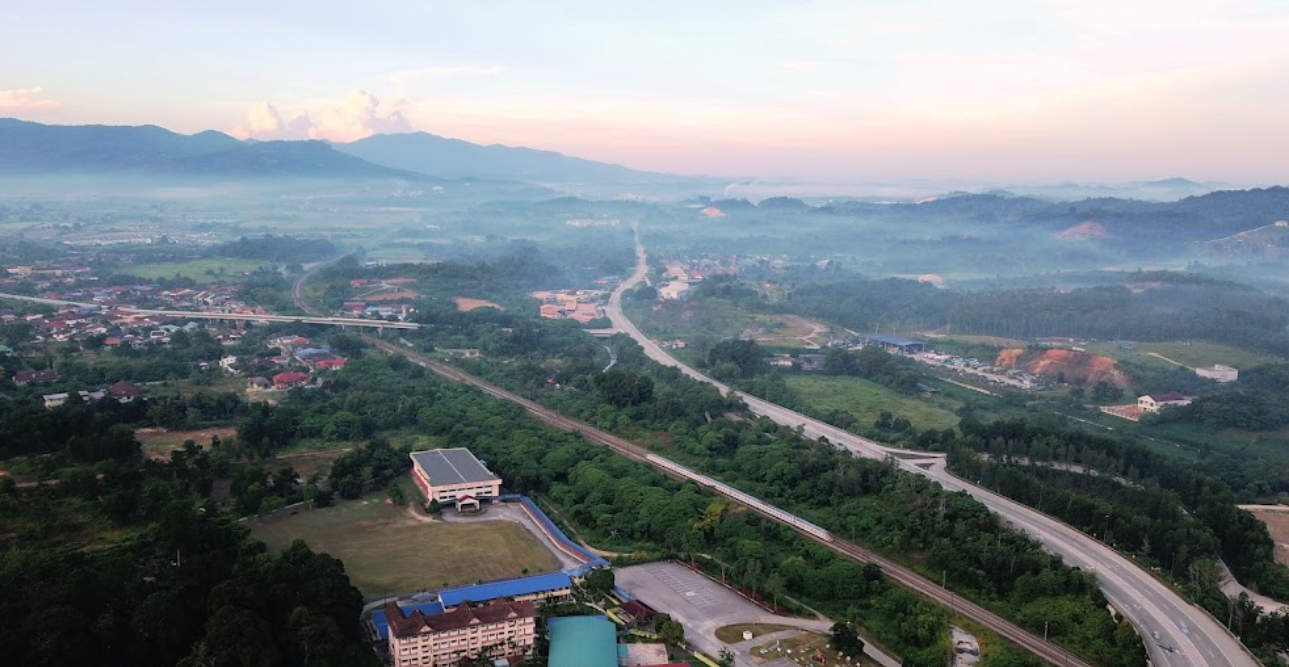
- Aerial view of Batang Kali

- Location in Hulu Selangor District
- Coordinates: 03°27′45″N 101°39′18″E
- Country: Malaysia
- State: Selangor
- District: Hulu Selangor

Government
  - Local government: Hulu Selangor Municipal Council

Population (2020)
  - Total: 35,000
  - Density: 2,792.1/sq mi (1,078.04/km^{2})
- Time zone: UTC+8 (MST)
  - Summer (DST): Not observed
- ZIP Codes: 44200-44300, 48200
- Area code: 03

Batang Kali is a town and mukim in Hulu Selangor District, Selangor, Malaysia. The city is designated as a transit point to Genting Highlands, a renowned resort city. Originally just a small town gaining traction due to the development of Ligamas, Batang Kali is now quickly emerging as one of the fastest-growing suburb in Hulu Selangor District.

== History ==
The downtown of Batang Kali, Bandar Utama Batang Kali is primarily a planned city, developed on what originally is an oil palm plantations by Ligamas, Ltd. After the initial development by Ligamas in the early 2000, Batang Kali quickly took off with many new inhabitants moving into the town. From time to time, more investors and developers lay their foundation in the town.

A newer latex thread factory, built by Filmax Sdn Bhd, a subsidiary of Heveafil Sdn Bhd, opened on 23 February 1990. Built at a cost of RM 50 million, the factory began producing latex thread in November 1989 and was expected to produce 26,000 tonnes of latex, equivalent to Malaysia's 50% share in the production capacity of the product, compared to the old factory which produce 13,000 tonnes of latex.

== Geography ==
Batang Kali is a name for both a mukim and the city. The mukim has a total area of -. Nearby mukims are Ulu Yam and Rasa mukims.

The location of Batang Kali being at the base of Titiwangsa Mountains and near the major resort city Genting Highlands, made it an attractive location to tourists all around the country. Many recreational parks and holiday resorts have been opened all around it, especially along the route connecting Batang Kali and Genting Highlands.

== Bandar Utama Batang Kali ==
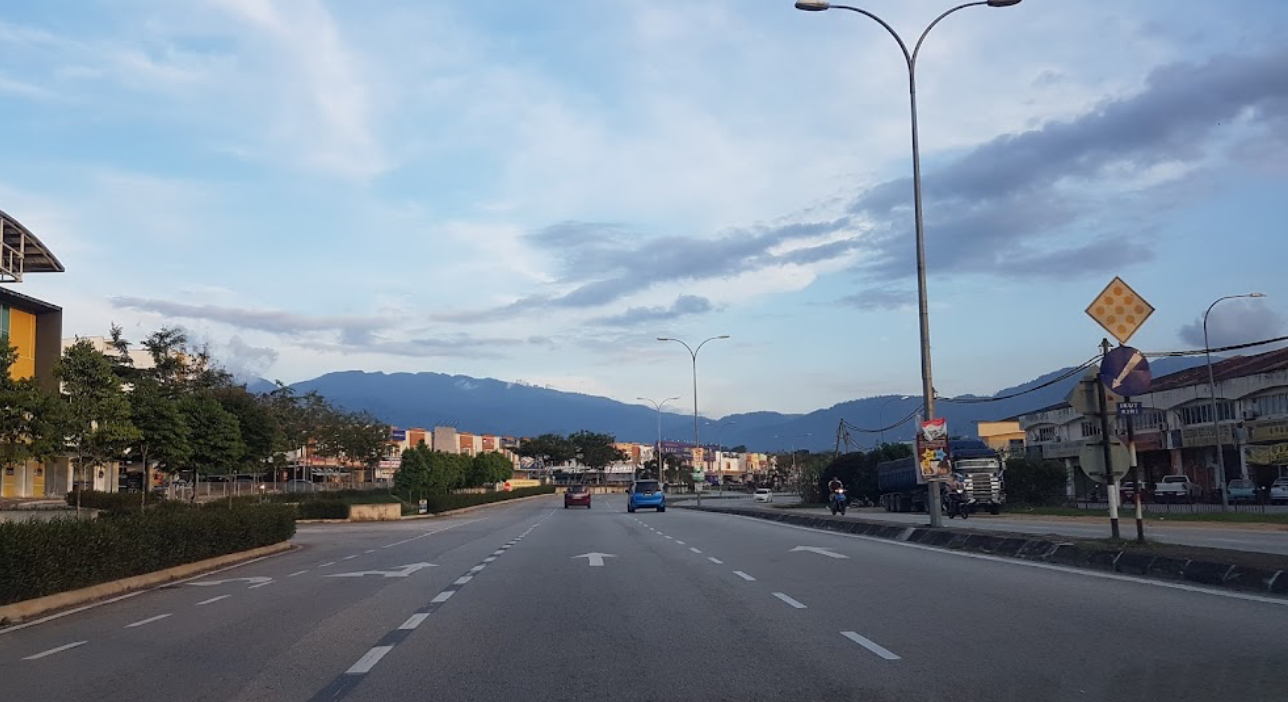
Downtown Batang Kali with the Titiwangsa Mountains in the background

Batang Kali's biggest development that thus denotes as the downtown of the city, Bandar Utama Batang Kali, is where all the businesses reside. Bandar Utama Batang Kali is situated at the core of the city with shopping, restaurants and residential services. Bandar Utama Batang Kali is steadily expanding with new sections being added as new developments are being constructed, such as the Pusat Perdagangan Ara. As of 2023, many businesses are present in and around Batang Kali.

== Transportation ==
=== Rail services ===
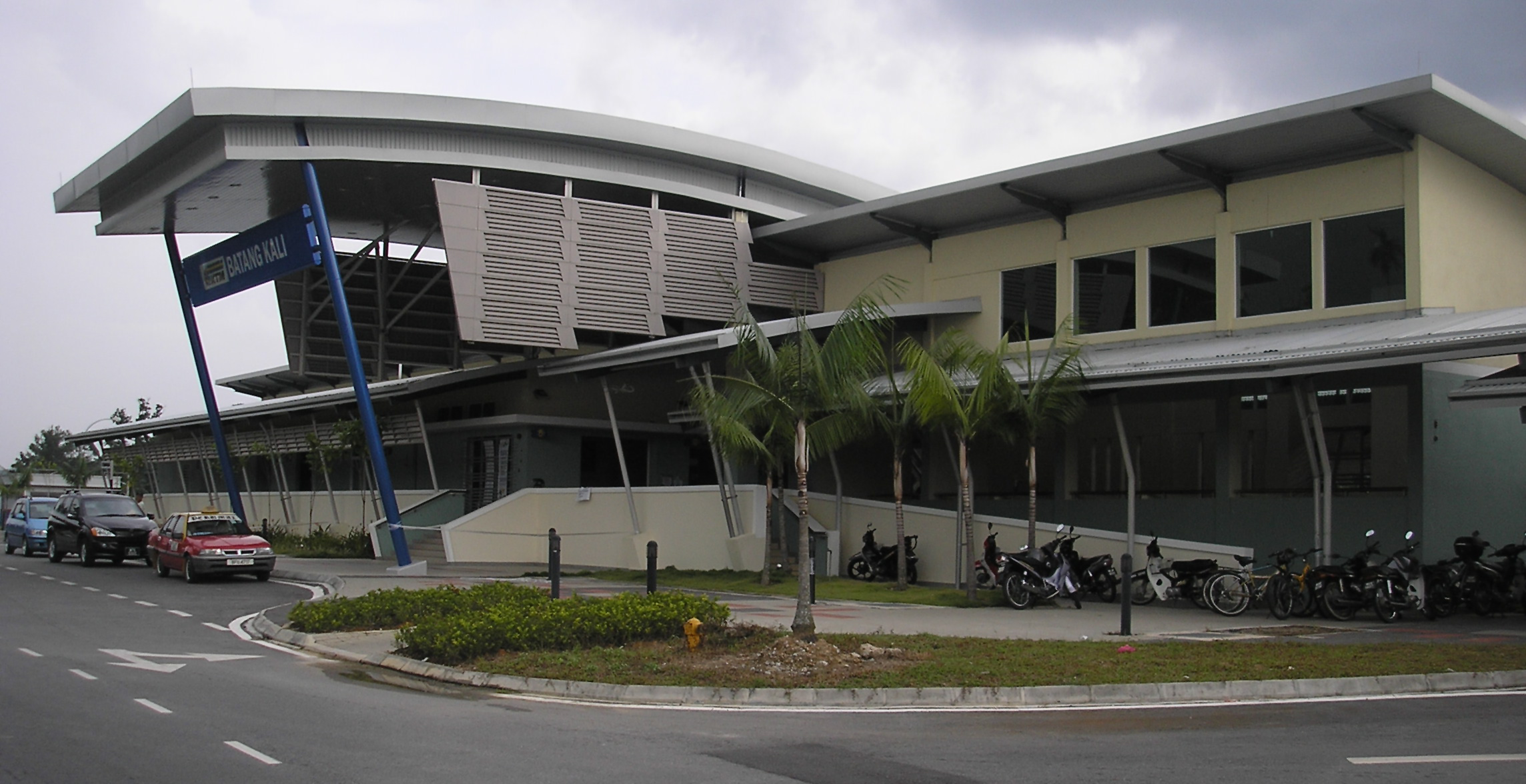
Batang Kali Station

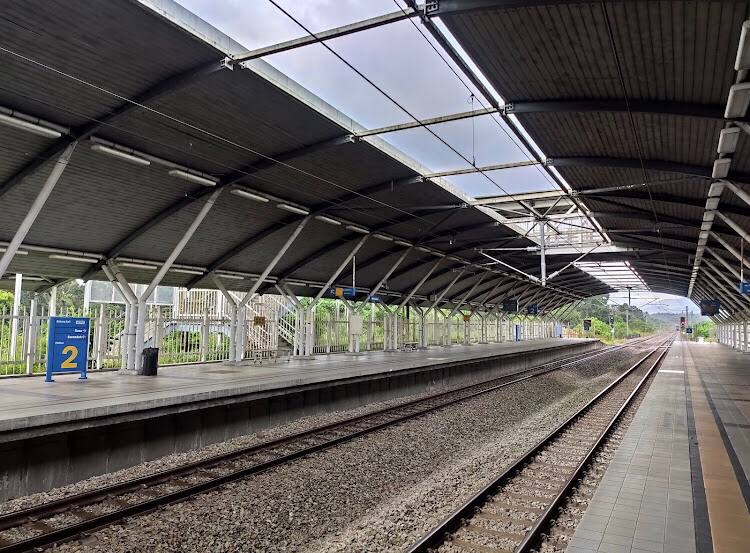
Batang Kali Station train platforms

Batang Kali is connected to KTM Port Klang line by Batang Kali railway station.

=== Major roads ===
Federal Route 1

== Notable events ==
The Batang Kali massacre occurred at this location on 12 December 1948 during the period of the Malayan Emergency.

On 16 December 2022, a landslide hit campsites in Father's Organic Farm at Jalan Batang Kali–Genting Highlands (Selangor State Route B66) near the town, killing 31 people, 8 of them are children.

== Education ==
Schools within the township boundary of Batang Kali include:

Elementary:

- Sekolah Kebangsaan Kampung Kuantan
- Sekolah Kebangsaan Batang Kali
- Sekolah Kebangsaan Bandar Baru Batang Kali
- Sekolah Jenis Kebangsaan (Tamil) Ladang Batang Kali
- Sekolah Jenis Kebangsaan (Cina) Kampung Gurney
- Sekolah Jenis Kebangsaan (Cina) Choong Chee
- Sekolah Jenis Kebangsaan (Cina) Batang Kali
- Sekolah Rendah Agama Batang Kali

Secondary:

- Sekolah Menengah Kebangsaan Syed Mashor
- Sekolah Menengah Kebangsaan Bandar Baru Batang Kali
