= Ulu Yam =

Human settlement in Malaysia

Coordinates: 3°25′59″N 101°39′27″E

Ulu Yam in Hulu Selangor District

Hulu Yam Bharu street

Ulu Yam is one of the oldest towns in Hulu Selangor District, Selangor, Malaysia. Ulu Yam is separated into two different parts, Ulu Yam Lama and Ulu Yam Bharu. As their name suggests, Ulu Yam Lama is the original town and Ulu Yam Bharu came into development afterwards.

It is famous for its lor mee (or noodles in thick soya gravy), and is especially popular among residents of nearby Kuala Lumpur Loh Mee was Founded by Hock Choon Kee, which was the 1st generation resident during the Emergency period in Malaya back then, he was exiled to Ulu Yam by the British administration due to his involvement in Communist activities and running a prostitution ring that stretched from Kuala Kubu Baru to Kuala Selangor. Ulu Yam is also a transit point to the Genting Highlands Resort after Batang Kali. The British administration gazetted Ulu Yam as a Communist hot-spot and surrounded it to keep the Chinese in check. In order to minimize Communist influence, all residents back then were not allowed to go into jungle.

Ulu Yam is also well known by its natural surroundings and places such as waterfalls (around 2-4). One of it has five stages. There are also three natural hot springs.

== Transportation ==
- Ulu Yam railway station
