= Batu Caves =

Cave system in Gombak, Selangor, Malaysia

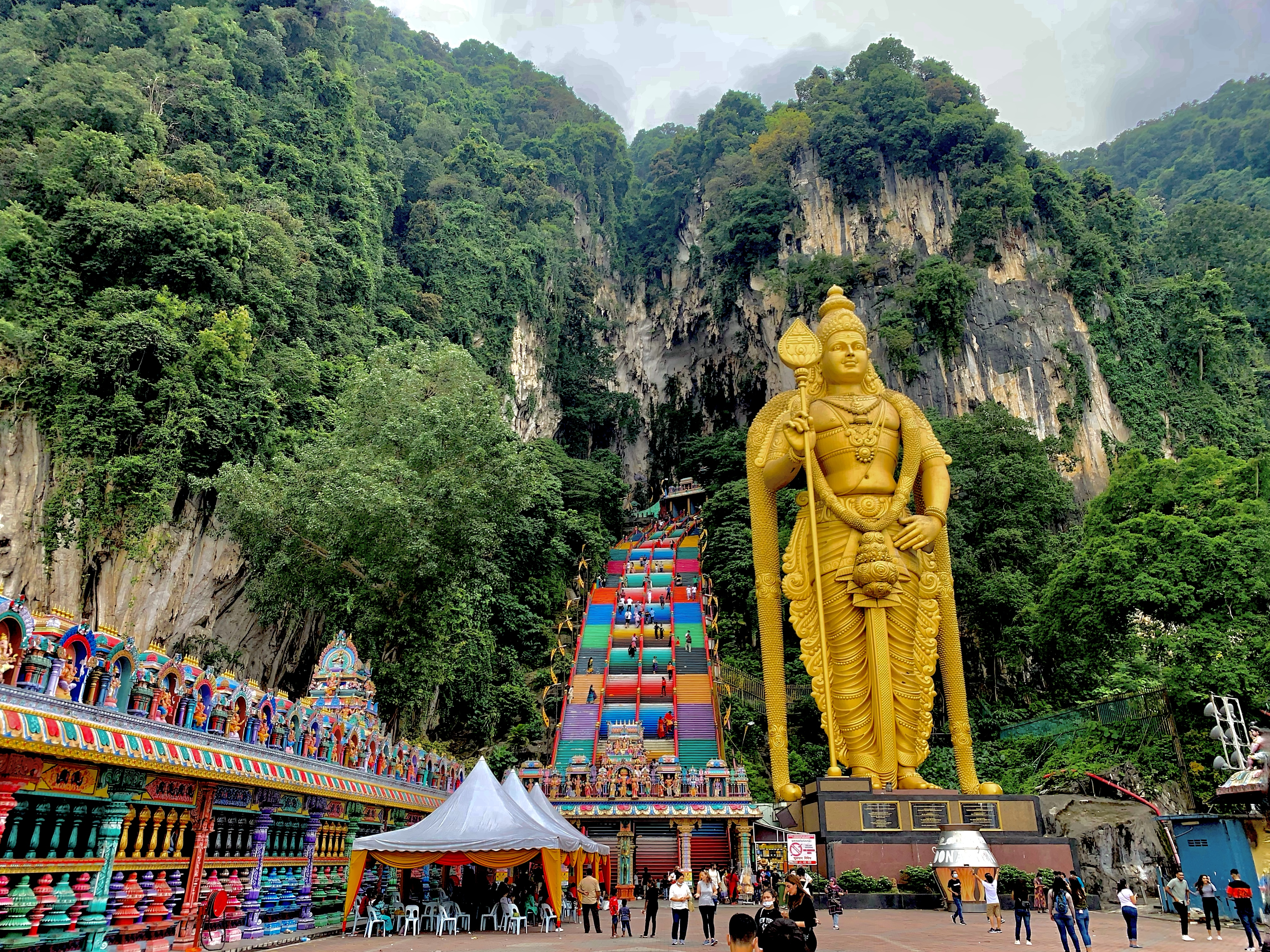
- Entrance to the cave complex with the Murugan statue in the front

Religion
- Affiliation: Hinduism
- District: Gombak
- Deity: Murugan
- Festival: Thaipusam

Location
- State: Selangor
- Country: Malaysia
- Interactive map of Batu Caves
- Coordinates: 3°14′15″N 101°41′02″E

Architecture
- Type: Dravidian Architecture
- Completed: 1920

Batu Caves are a series of limestone caves in Gombak, Selangor, Malaysia. It is located on a 325 m (1,066 ft)–tall mogote, about 13 km (8.1 mi) north of the Malaysian capital of Kuala Lumpur. The cave complex contains many Hindu temples, the most popular of which is a shrine dedicated to Murugan, and is the focal point of the Tamil Hindu festival of Thaipusam in Malaysia. The complex hosts a 43 m (141 ft) tall Murugan statue, amongst the tallest Murugan statues in the world.

== Etymology ==
The name for the cave complex is derived from the word batu from Malay meaning "rock". The hill was called as "Kapal Tanggang" (ship of Si Tanggang) as per Si Tanggang, the Malay version of the Minang folktale Malin Kundang. In Tamil, the temple complex is called as Pathu malai (பத்து மலை).

== History ==
The caves were used as shelters by the indigenous Temuan people, a tribe of Orang Asli. In the 1860s, Chinese settlers began excavating guano from the caves, used as fertilisers. In 1878, the caves were visited by American naturalist William Hornaday. K. Thamboosamy, an Indian Tamil trader, promoted the cave complex as a site of Hindu worship. A Hindu temple dedicated to lord Murugan was completed in 1891 with the annual Thaipusam celebrations commencing in 1892. Further development of religious sites has happened ever since in the region. Housing development around the region began in the late 20th century with non-governmental organisations expressing concerns about the over-development.

== Geology ==
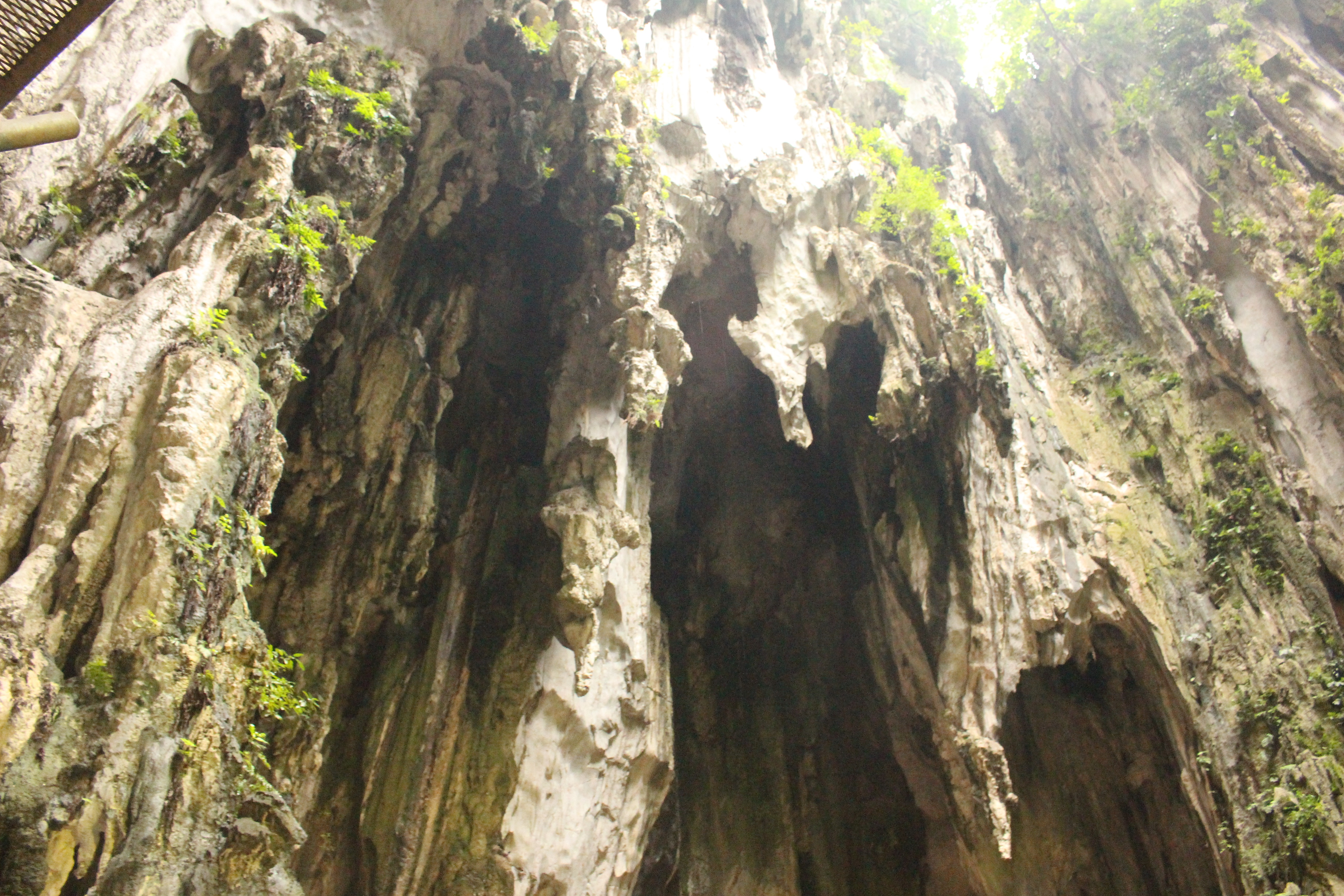
Karst limestone formation

The caves are situated on a 325 m (1,066 ft)-tall mogote and consists of a series of limestone caves, formed more than 400 million years ago. It is a complex cave system consisting of 20 recognized caves including four large cave systems with multiple inter-connected chambers.

Water which fell on the surface of the caves, percolated through it, and interacted with the subsurface, causing the dissolution of limestone rocks, and resulting in the formation of speleothems. There are numerous stalactites jutting from the ceiling, stalagmites rising from the floor, and other formations such as flowstones, cave pearls, and scallops. The interiors would have been damp and wet when the caves were being formed.

While it is widely stated that the caves themselves are 400 million years old, this age only refers to the formation of the limestone. It is estimated that the deposits started lifting in the Devonian, Carboniferous or even Triassic period (around 300-200 million years ago), and that the formation of the caves started in the late Cretaceous or early Tertiary age, i.e. 60-120 million years ago.

== Biodiversity ==
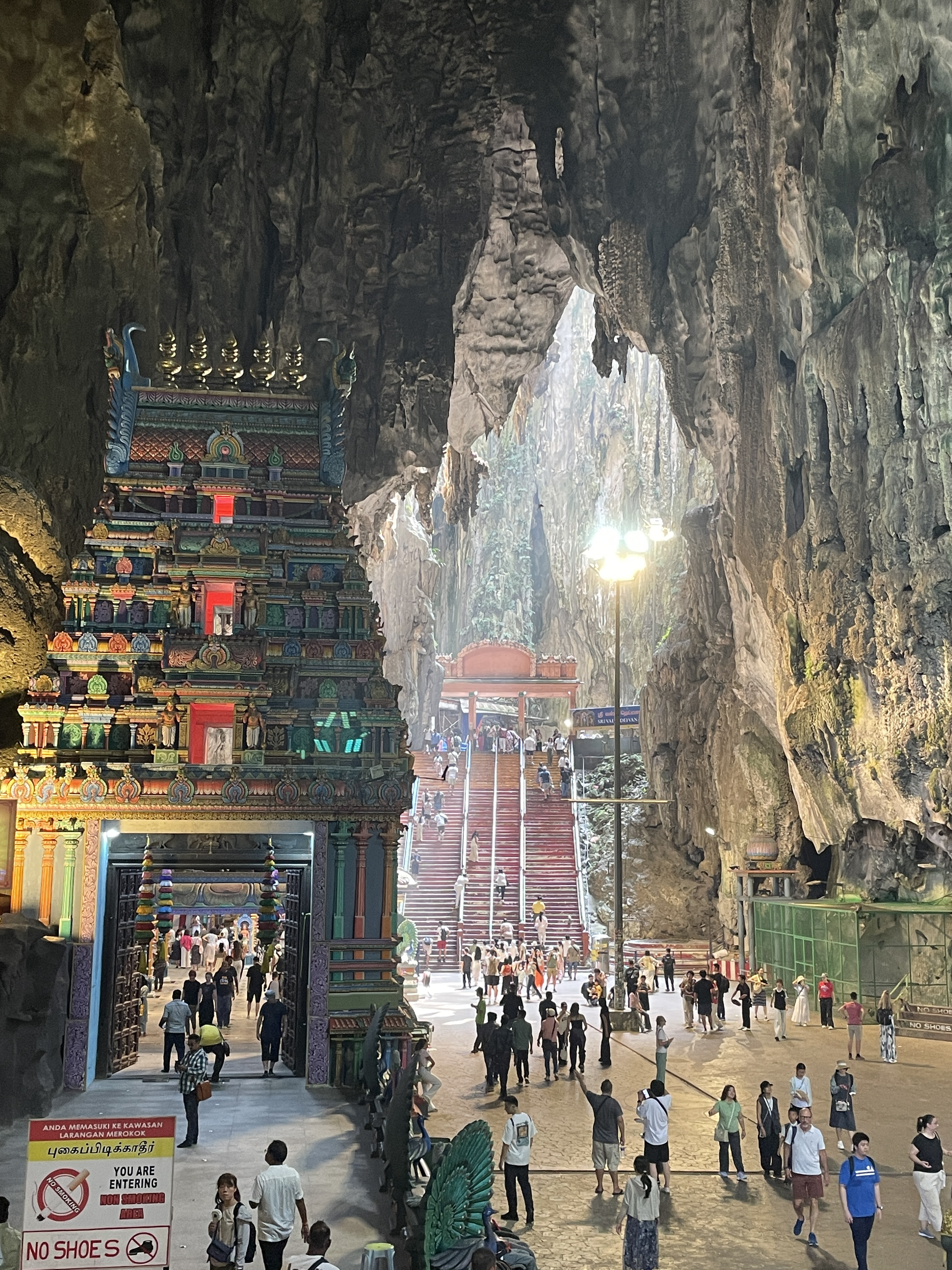
The dark interior of the caves host many plant and animal species

The Batu cave system and its caverns is a biodiversity hotspot consisting of many plant and animal species, many of which are specific to such limestone environments. About 269 species of vascular plants including 56 species (21%) of calciphiles have been recorded from the site. There are a diverse range of cave fauna, including endemic species such as the trapdoor spider Liphistius batuensis. There are 21 species of bats, including several species of fruit bats. The dark cave system is home to numerous species of insects including haplotaxids, spiders, mites, ticks, scorpions, springtails, beetles, flies, ants, wasps, bees, butterflies, moths and other animals such as frogs, lizards, snakes, snails and large numbers of introduced rock pigeons. The bat guano is home to a native species of cockroach, Pycnoscelus striatus.

The site is also home to numerous long-tailed macaques. The monkeys often depend on people for food and might cause disturbance or nuisance. To preserve the cave's ecology, access is restricted in the inner cave complex which can be accessed by the educational trips organised by the Malaysian Nature Society. Development over the years, industrial activity, and the high number of footfalls due to the religious site are threats to the biodiversity in the region.

== Religious site ==
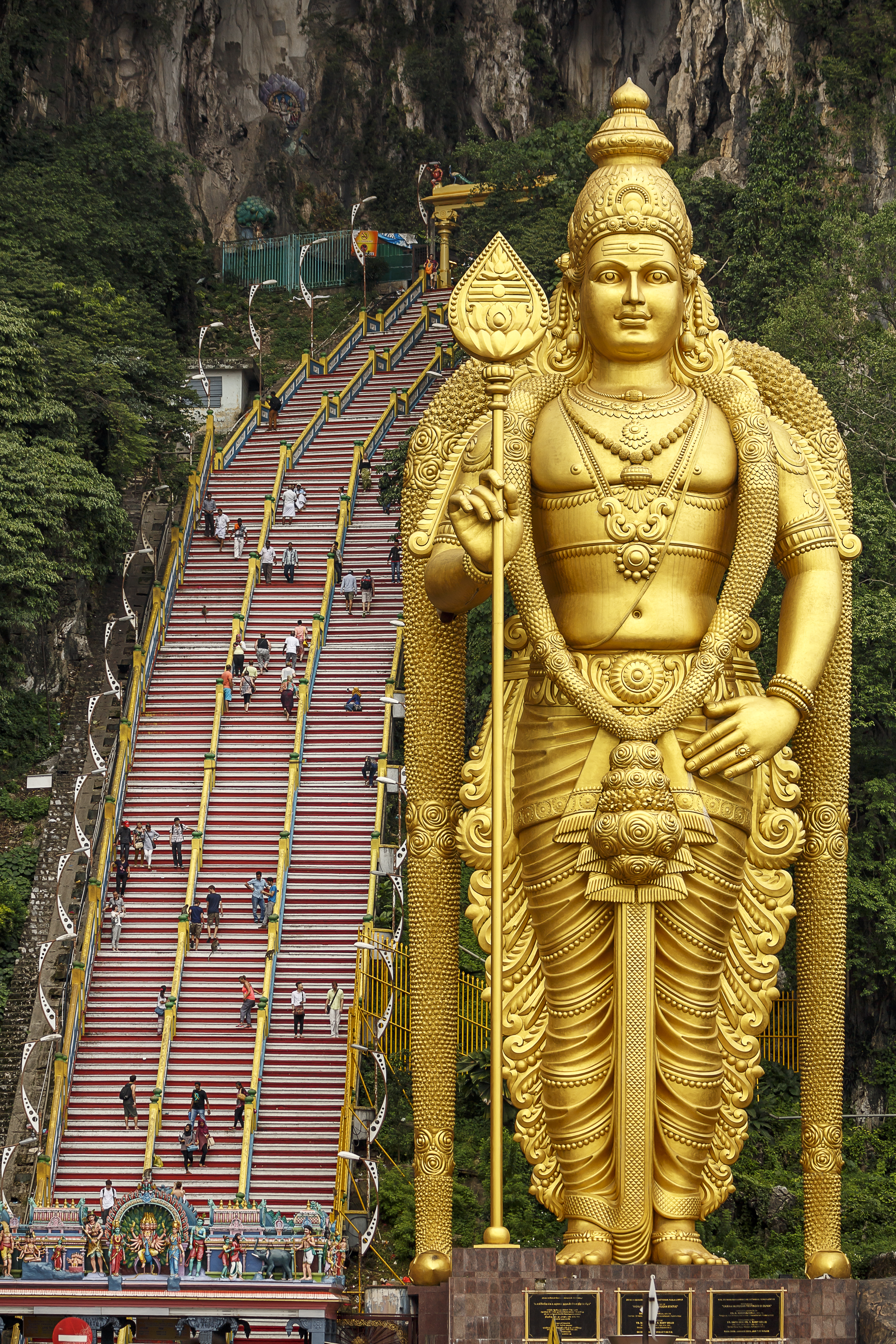
Steps to the temple with the Murugan statue in the front

The Subramanian Swamy temple, dedicated to Murugan, is located in the largest cave in the complex. The similarity of the cave entrance to a vel (a divine spear wielded by Murugan) is said to have inspired Thamboosamy to build a temple. Initially, the hill had to be climbed on foot to reach the temple, and wooden steps were installed in 1920 to enable the pilgrims to reach the temple. In the 1930s, the wooden stairs started showing signs of deterioration and a plan was made to build concrete steps on the southern side of the cave complex. In 1940, 272 concrete steps were constructed under the initial proposal of Ramachandra Naidu in the 1930s, which exist to date. In August 2018, the steps were re-painted with each set consisting of a particular number of steps painted in a different color. In 2024, plans were unveiled to build a multi-purpose hall in the foothills and an escalator to the temple.

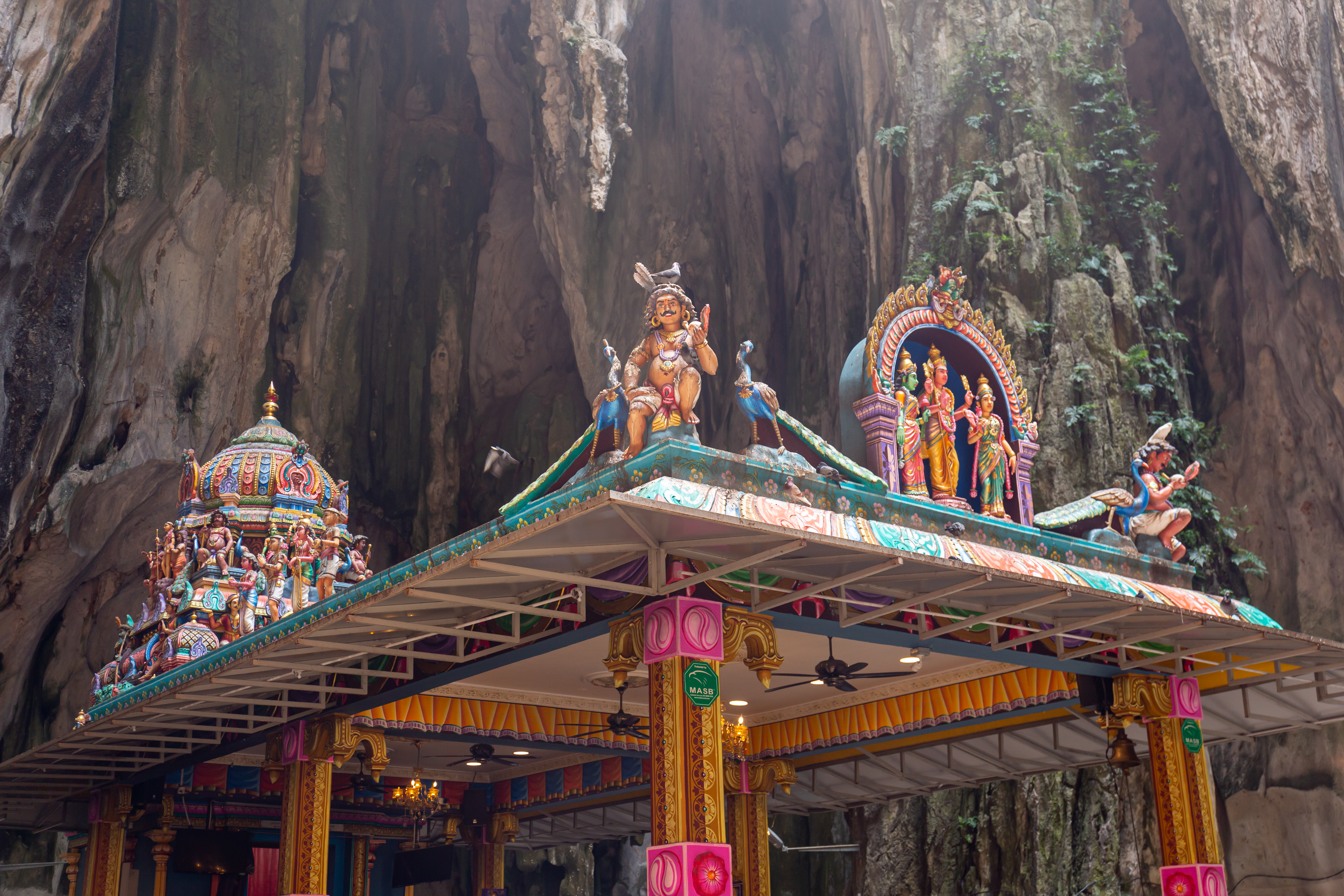
The main shrine

To the right of the steps which serve as an entrance to the cave complex, a 42.7 m (140 ft) tall statue of Murugan was unveiled in January 2006. Painted in gold, it is amongst the tallest Murugan statues in the world and the tallest statue in Malaysia.

At the base of the hill are two caves, Art Gallery Cave and Museum Cave, which form the Cave Villa complex. These consist of statues and paintings from Hindu mythology, most of them relating to the life of Murugan. The Ramayana Cave is situated to the left, which consists of paintings depicting events from the Hindu epic Ramayana. There is a 15 m (49 ft) tall statue of Hanuman at the entrance and a temple dedicated to Hanuman, opened in November 2001.

=== Thaipusam festival ===
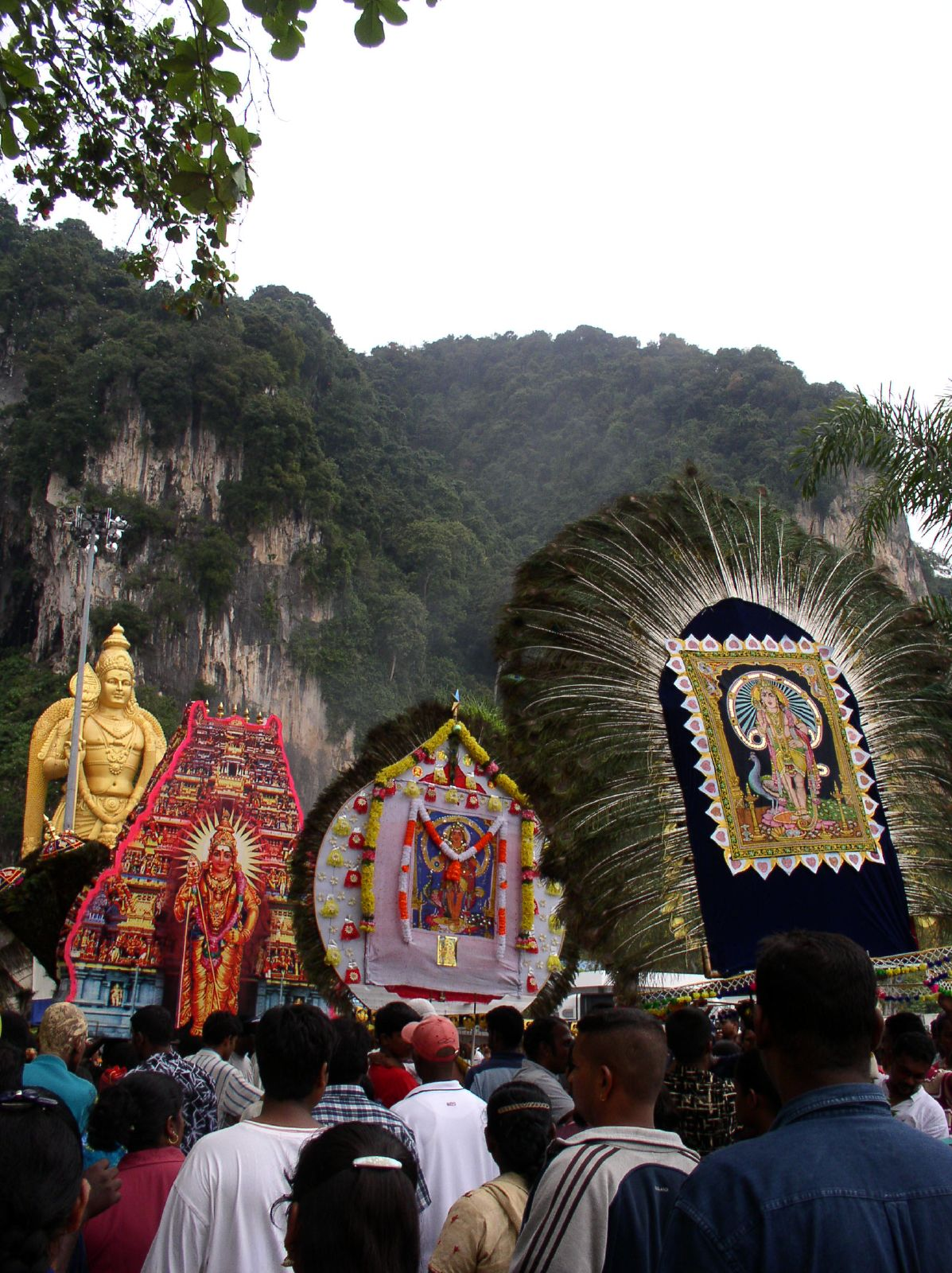
Thaipusam procession at Batu caves

The Batu Caves serve as the focal point of the yearly Thaipusam (Tamil: தைபூசம்) festival, celebrated by Tamil Hindus, and attracts thousands of people for the elaborate festivities. Kavadi Aattam is a ceremonial act of sacrifice and offering practiced by devotees, which forms a central part of the festival. Kavadi (meaning "burden" in Tamil) itself is a physical burden, which usually consists of two semicircular pieces of wood or steel which are bent and attached to a cross structure in its simplest form, that is balanced on the shoulders of the devotee and signifies a form of debt bondage. Worshipers often carry pot(s) of cow milk as an offering (paal kudam). The most extreme and spectacular practice is the carrying of Vel kavadi, a portable altar decorated with peacock feathers and flowers, that is attached to the body of the devotee through multiple skewers and metal hooks pierced into the skin on the chest and back.

People also do a form of mortification of the flesh by piercing the skin, tongue or cheeks with vel skewers and flagellation. Vibuthi, a type of holy ash is spread across the body including the piercing sites. Drumming and chanting of verses help the devotees enter a state of trance. Devotees usually prepare for the rituals by keeping clean, doing regular prayers, following a vegetarian diet and fasting while remaining celibate for 48 days. A procession begins in the morning on Thaipusam from the Sri Mahamariamman Temple, Kuala Lumpur. A silver chariot weighing 350 kg (770 lb) carrying the idols of Murugan with his consorts Valli and Deivanai is taken along the procession, accompanied by the devotees. After ritual bathing in the nearby Sungai Batu River, the devotees make their way to the temple.

== Rock climbing ==
Several scenes of the Batu Caves, 2022

The cave complex which exists on a hillock is a place for rock climbing. There are nearly 160 climbing routes on the north-eastern side of the cave complex, called Damai caves. The routes are scattered across the sides with hills rising to 150 metres (490 ft). These climbing routes can be accessed from the ground level with abseiling and spelunking trips organized by local companies.

== Transportation ==
Batu Caves can be reached by taking the commuter train from KL Sentral in Kuala Lumpur to the Batu Caves Komuter station. Batu Caves may also be reached by bus 11 from Bangkok Bank stop near Central Market. Batu Caves can also be reached by car.

== See also ==
- List of caves in Malaysia
