= Malaysia Federal Route 3208 =

Road in Malaysia

Federal Route 3208
- Jalan Bukit Beruntung
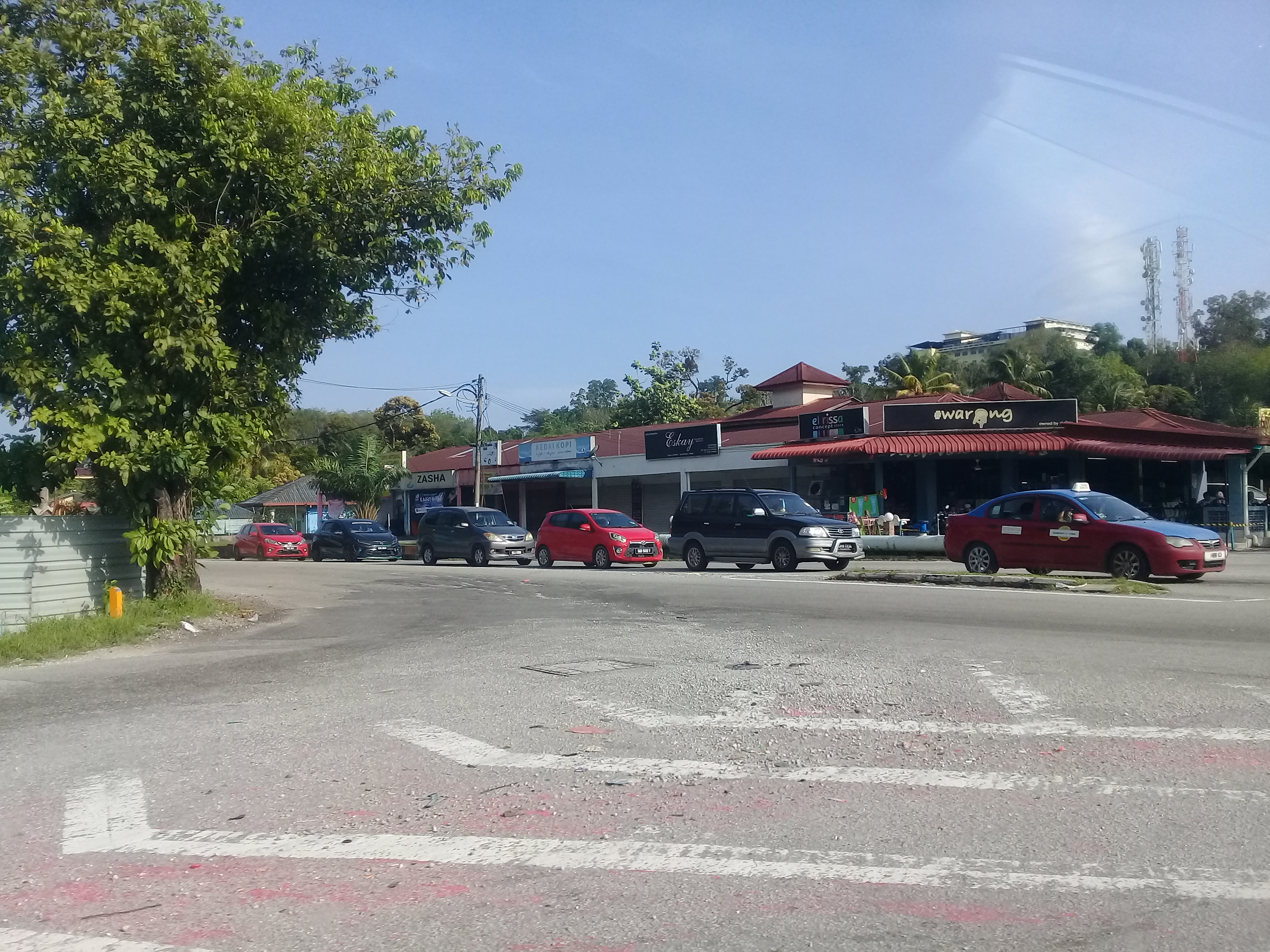

Route information
- Maintained by Malaysian Public Works Department
- Length: 10.6 km (6.6 mi)

Major junctions
- Northwest end: Bukit Beruntung
- North–South Expressway Northern Route / AH2; FT 1208 Jalan Sungai Buaya; FT 1 Federal Route 1
- Southeast end: Sungai Choh

Location
- Country: Malaysia
- Primary destinations: Bandar Sungai Buaya, Serendah, Batang Kali, Ulu Yam, Genting Highlands, Rawang

Highway system
- Highways in Malaysia; Expressways; Federal; State

Federal Route 3208, Jalan Bukit Beruntung (formerly Selangor State Route B112), is an industrial federal road in Selangor, Malaysia.

The Kilometre Zero is located at Sungai Choh, at its interchange with the Federal Route 1, the main trunk road of the central of Peninsular Malaysia.

At most sections, the Federal Route 3208 was built under the JKR R5 road standard, allowing maximum speed limit of up to 90 km/h.

Jalan Bukit Beruntung is known as the "death route" due to frequent road accidents at night, mainly motorcyclists who work night shifts at Perodua and Tan Chong Motor factories in Sungai Choh. As of 2009, there were no road lamps installed in the road. The either sides of the road are full of dense forests.

A newer road, connecting Jalan Bukit Beruntung to the UMW High Value Manufacturing Park in Serendah, was constructed by Mewah Kota Sdn Bhd, a company of Stella Holdings Berhad.

== Junction lists ==
The entire route is located in Hulu Selangor District, Selangor.

Legend:

- I/C - Interchange, I/S - Intersection, RSA - Rest and service area, OBR - Overhead bridge restaurant, R/R - Restaurant and rest plaza, L/B - Layby, V/P - Vista point, TN - tunnel, T/P - Toll plaza, BR - Bridge
- C - Cloverleaf, S - Stack, T-A - Trumpet-A, T-B - Trumpet-B, DT - Directional-T/Y, SDT - Semi-Directional-T/Y, P-Y - Partial-Y, D - Diamond, P-C - Partial cloverleaf, D-D - Diverging diamond, D-R - Direct ramp

Location	km	mi	Name	Destinations	Notes
Bukit Beruntung			Bukit Beruntung	Bukit Beruntung Golf and Country Club	
Bukit Beruntung			Bukit Beruntung; Bukit Beruntung-NSE	North–South Expressway Northern Route / AH2 – Bukit Kayu Hitam, Ipoh, Bukit Tagar, Rawang, Klang, Kuala Lumpur	T-junctions
Bukit Beruntung			Bukit Beruntung		
Bukit Beruntung			Bukit Beruntung Estate		
Bukit Beruntung			Taman Bukit Teratai		
Serendah			Sungai Serendah bridge		
Serendah			Jalan Sungai Buaya	FT 1208 Jalan Sungai Buaya – Sungai Buaya, Bandar Sungai Buaya, Kampung Sungai Guntong; North–South Expressway Northern Route / AH2 – Bukit Kayu Hitam, Ipoh, Kuala Lumpur, Klang	T-junctions
Serendah			Serendah Industrial Park	Serendah Industrial Park – Perodua Car Assembly Plant	T-junctions
Serendah			Railway crossing bridge		
Serendah			Kampung Hilir Indah	Kampung Hilir Indah, Kampung Stesen, Taman Daya Permata	Junctions
Sungai Choh	0.0	0.0	Sungai Choh	FT 1 Malaysia Federal Route 1 – Serendah, Batang Kali, Ulu Yam, Genting Highlands, Ipoh, Rawang, Bestari Jaya (Batang Berjuntai), Selayang, Batu Caves, Kuala Lumpur	T-junctions
1.000 mi = 1.609 km; 1.000 km = 0.621 mi
