= Smart Selangor Bus =

Bus service in Selangor

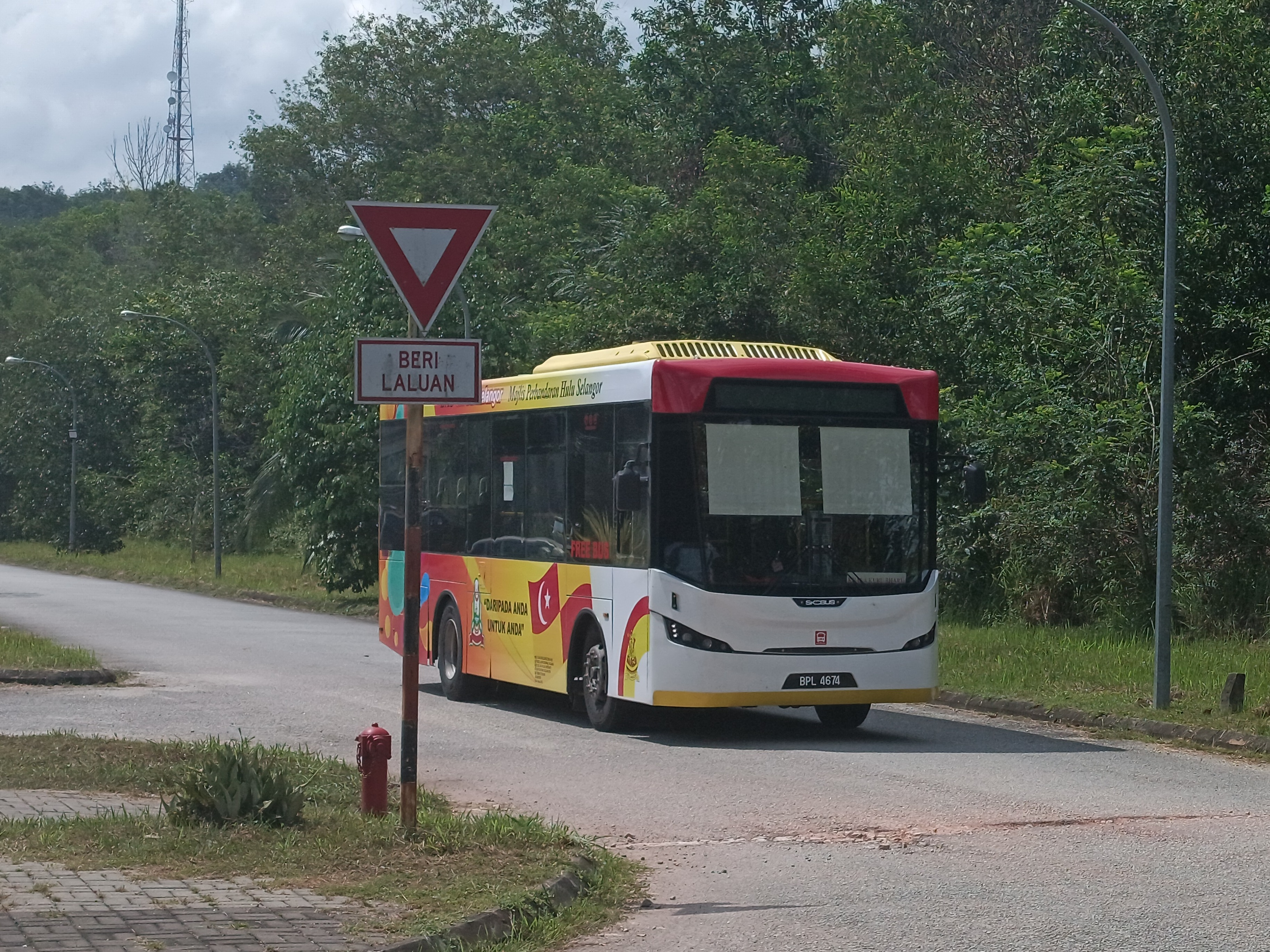
- A Smart Selangor bus seen at Kuala Kubu Bharu railway station.
- Formerly: Bas Selangorku
- Parent: Government of Selangor
- Founded: 1 July 2015; 11 years ago
- Headquarters: Shah Alam, Selangor
- Locale: Selangor, Malaysia
- Service area: Shah Alam; Klang; Subang Jaya; Kajang; Ampang; Banting; Selayang; Sepang; Kuala Selangor; Sabak Bernam; Hulu Selangor
- Service type: Free bus service
- Destinations: 60 active routes across 12 local councils
- Fleet: 150
- Daily ridership: 25,573 (Daily Total, 2025) (▼1.6%); 17,361 (Smart Selangor Bus, 2025) (▼4.3%); 8,212 (PJ City Bus, 2025) (▲4.6%)
- Annual ridership: 7.84 million (2025 State Assembly Record); 7.76 million (APAD Record, 2025) (▼3.7%); 5.32 million (Smart Selangor Bus, 2025) (▼6.6%); 2.44 million (PJ City Bus, 2025) (▲3.4%)
- Operator: Rapid Bus, Wawasan Sutera, Causeway Link, SKS Coachbuilders, UNIC Leisure Transtour

Smart Selangor Bus (formerly known as Bas Selangorku) is a free public transportation service initiated by the Selangor State Government in Malaysia, to provide efficient and high-quality transit options for its residents. Launched in July 2015, the program began with three local authorities and expanded to all twelve local government authorities (PBT) in the state. The program is managed locally by each respective local authority as the implementing agency.

== History ==
The service was launched on 1 July 2015 with initial services deployed in areas under the Shah Alam City Council (MBSA), Klang Royal City Council (MBDK, then MPK) and Subang Jaya City Council (MBSJ, then MPSJ) in an effort to reduce traffic congestion and promote public transport usage in Selangor. The service has operated over 11 years (since 2015) and maintains 60 active routes across the state.

For the 2025 financial year, the Selangor State Government allocated a total budget of RM11,485,824.98 for the operation and maintenance of the Smart Selangor Bus network.

=== Selangor Mobiliti and First/Last-Mile Connectivity ===
The service became an integral part of the Selangor Mobiliti initiative. Selangor Mobiliti expanded transit coverage through Demand-Responsive Transit (DRT) van services operating in 8 high-density zones (Subang Jaya, Puchong, Petaling Jaya, Sungai Buloh, Ampang, Serdang, and Hulu Kelang).

Under the Selangor State Mobility Master Plan (PIMNS), Smart Selangor Bus routes and DRT operations are integrated with pedestrian walkway planning to address first-mile and last-mile connectivity. The policy focuses on creating safe, accessible, and continuous pedestrian infrastructure to reduce personal vehicle dependency in urban and suburban areas.

=== Scan to Ride ===
Starting 15 March 2021, passengers boarding Smart Selangor buses (and PJ City Bus services from 1 January 2023) are required to scan a QR code using the Citizen E-Payment (CEPat) mobile application. While Malaysian citizens ride for free (Malaysians aged 18 to 59 scan via CEPat, while students and senior citizens show their MyKad/identity cards), foreign nationals are charged a nominal fare of 90 sen per trip.

== Ridership ==
In 2025, the Smart Selangor Bus network recorded a total annual ridership of 7,838,779 passengers across all 60 active routes.

=== Ridership by Local Authority (2025) ===
The Petaling Jaya City Council (MBPJ) recorded the highest passenger volume, accounting for over 2.5 million passengers under its PJ City Bus branding, followed by the Shah Alam City Council (MBSA) with 1.82 million passengers.

Rank	Local Authority (PBT)	Total Annual Passengers (2025)
1	Petaling Jaya City Council (MBPJ)	2,522,636
2	Shah Alam City Council (MBSA)	1,829,550
3	Ampang Jaya Municipal Council (MPAJ)	719,853
4	Subang Jaya City Council (MBSJ)	632,755
5	Sepang Municipal Council (MPSp)	516,353
6	Kajang Municipal Council (MPKj)	489,193
7	Selayang Municipal Council (MPS)	316,787
8	Klang Royal City Council (MBDK)	310,392
9	Hulu Selangor Municipal Council (MPHS)	156,531
10	Kuala Selangor Municipal Council (MPKS)	134,435
11	Kuala Langat Municipal Council (MPKL)	108,752
12	Sabak Bernam District Council (MDSB)	101,542
Total Ridership (2025)		7,838,779

== Routes ==
The Smart Selangor bus network comprises 60 active routes operating across the 12 local government areas in Selangor. Standard operating hours in urban centers run from 06:00 to 22:00 daily.

=== Route Popularity and Ridership Ranking (2025) ===
The table below ranks all 60 Smart Selangor bus routes by annual passenger volume recorded in 2025. Route PJ01 (Taman Medan – LRT Taman Jaya) was the most used route with over 1.02 million passengers, whereas route HS03 (Terminal Bukit Sentosa – Precinct 11) recorded the lowest volume with 647 passengers.

Rank	Route Code	Route Alignment / Termini	Annual Passengers (2025)
1	PJ01	Taman Medan – LRT Taman Jaya	1,021,291
2	PJ03	LRT Taman Bahagia – SS6 Kelana Park View	458,263
3	AJ03	Stesen LRT Cempaka – Taman Bukit Teratai	411,538
4	SA01	KTM Seksyen 19 – Seksyen 7	365,757
5	SPG1	Tanjung Sepat – Pekan Sungai Pelek – Pekan Sepang – KLIA – KLIA2	341,671
6	SA04	Terminal Seksyen 17 – Hospital Shah Alam	316,583
7	PJ04	LRT Taman Bahagia – Kg. Tunku – SS2	314,987
8	SA02	Hentian Pusat Bandar, Seksyen 14 – Stesen KTM Batu 3	290,151
9	PJ02	LRT Taman Jaya – SS2	288,155
10	PJ06	Bandar Utama – Damansara Damai	254,940
11	KJ01	Bandar Kajang – Kompleks Hentian Kajang	234,823
12	SA03	Stesen KTM Shah Alam – Seksyen 18 – Seksyen 17 – Seksyen 24	233,659
13	SJ03	LRT Kinrara BK5 – SMK Bandar Puchong Jaya	197,847
14	PJ05	Bandar Utama – LRT Taman Bahagia	185,000
15	SPG2	Taman Salak Perdana – Pusat Penjaja Taman Seroja – ERL Salak Tinggi – Kipmall Kota Warisan – KLIA – KLIA2	169,246
16	SJ02	LRT Pusat Bandar Puchong – Bandar Sunway – Stesen LRT SS18	167,437
17	SJ01	BRT USJ 7 – LRT Subang Jaya	162,412
18	MPS1	Selayang Mutiara – Terminal Putra Gombak	150,253
19	AJ01	Ukay Perdana – Taman Melawati	144,918
20	SA05	Seksyen 13 – Pekan Subang	142,248
21	AJ04	Taman Lembah Maju – Pandan Height	120,539
22	KJ03	Stesen MRT BTHO – Cheras Perdana – Taman Tun Perak	115,735
23	KLG1	Bandar Klang – Hospital Tengku Ampuan Rahimah Klang	114,473
24	KJ02	KTM Bangi – Nilai	114,139
25	SA08	LRT Alam Megah – Meranti Terrace	109,552
26	SA06	Kota Kemuning – Seksyen 19	108,967
27	SJ04	Hospital Serdang – KTM Serdang	85,182
28	HS01	Bukit Sentosa – Taman Bunga Raya – Bukit Sentosa	81,064
29	BTG01	Bandar Banting – KLIA2	80,019
30	SA07	Stesen KTM Batu Tiga – Perumahan Seksyen 19	79,912
31	MPS3	Batu Arang – KTM Sungai Buloh – Hospital Sungai Buloh	74,390
32	KS02	Bandar Puncak Alam (Lotus’s) – MRT Sg. Buloh	71,169
33	MPS2A	Lotus Rawang – Hentian Bas Rawang via Bukit Rawang	67,117
34	KS01	Kuala Selangor – Tg. Karang – Sekinchan	63,266
35	SA10	Bukit Jelutong, Seksyen U8 – Bukit Subang, U16	63,249
36	SA09	Kota Kemuning, Seksyen 31 – Kg. Jalan Kebun	61,095
37	KLG2A	SJKC Kong Hoe – Taman Sri Pekan	58,455
38	HS04	Bukit Sentosa – Taman Bunga Raya	54,141
39	BK02	Pangsapuri De Bayu – SJKC Pin Hwa – Pangsapuri De Bayu	53,882
40	SB01	Sabak Bernam – Sungai Besar – Sekinchan	44,923
41	KLG3B	Lebuh Kebun Nenas – Bukit Naga	42,312
42	SB02	Sabak Bernam – Sg. Air Tawar – Parit Baru	41,671
43	KLG3A	Taman Seri Andalas – Bandar Klang	32,540
44	AJ2A	Bandar Baru Ampang – Taman Dagang Jaya	31,605
45	BTG02	Bandar Banting – Taman Banting Baru	28,733
46	KLG3C	Bandar Putera – Jalan Kebun – Bandar Klang	26,580
47	KLG4	Klang Sentral – Taman Seri Kerayong	26,161
48	MPS4	Wangsa Permai – Hentian Stadium Selayang	25,027
49	KJ04	Terminal Kajang – Bandar Baru Bangi	24,496
50	SJ05	Terminal Putra Permai – Pangsapuri Bayu	19,877
51	HS02	Antara Gapi – KTM Batang Kali – Antara Gapi	15,922
52	SB03	Kampung Merbau Berdarah – Sabak Bernam	14,948
53	AJ2B	Bandar Baru Ampang – Taman Dagang Jaya	11,253
54	KLG2B	SJKC Kong Hoe – Taman Intan – AEON Mall Bukit Raja	9,871
55	BK02	Bas Komuniti – Setia Alam (SU13)	4,495
56	HS03A	Bukit Sentosa – Bandar Sungai Buaya – Bukit Sentosa	3,083
57	SPG4	Pusat Penjaja Taman Seroja – Jenderam – Sg. Merab – Hospital Serdang – Terminal Bas IOI City Mall Putrajaya	2,778
58	SPG3	Pekan Salak – Pusat Penjaja Taman Seroja – Jenderam – Pekan Dengkil – Terminal Bas Cyberjaya	2,658
59	HS03B	Bukit Sentosa – KTM Serendah – Bukit Sentosa	1,674
60	HS03	Terminal Bukit Sentosa – Precinct 11	647

=== Detailed Route Alignments by Local Council ===
==== Shah Alam City Council (MBSA) ====
Operator	Route	Origin	Destination	First Trip	Last Trip	Frequency	Notes
SKS Coachbuilders	SA01	Shah Alam Komuter station	Section 7, Shah Alam	06:00	22:00	15 – 20 mins	Electric bus fleet.
Rapid Bus	SA02	Hentian Pusat Bandar	Batu Tiga Komuter station	06:00	22:00	20 – 30 mins	
Rapid Bus	SA05	Section 13	Bukit Jelutong	06:00	22:00	30 mins	
Rapid Bus	SA07	Batu Tiga Komuter station	Section 20	06:00	22:00	25 – 30 mins	Via HICOM.
Rapid Bus	SA08	Alam Megah LRT station	Meranti Terrace	06:00	22:00	25 – 30 mins	
Wawasan Sutera	SA03	Shah Alam Komuter station	Section 18, 17, 24	06:00	22:00	20 – 30 mins	
Wawasan Sutera	SA04	Terminal Seksyen 17	Hospital Shah Alam	06:00	22:00	20 – 30 mins	Goes into UiTM Shah Alam campus
Wawasan Sutera	SA06	Kota Kemuning	Shah Alam Komuter station	06:00	22:00	25 – 30 mins	
Wawasan Sutera	SA09	Kota Kemuning (Sec 31)	Kampung Jalan Kebun	06:00	22:00	30 – 40 mins	Uses compact buses.
Wawasan Sutera	BK02	Setia City Mall	Pangsapuri De Palma	06:00	22:00	30 – 40 mins	Also known as SU13A.
Wawasan Sutera	SA10	Bukit Subang	Bukit Jelutong	06:00	22:00	30 – 40 mins	

==== Subang Jaya City Council (MBSJ) ====
Operator	Route	Origin	Destination	First Trip	Last Trip	Frequency	Notes
SKS Coachbuilders	SJ01	USJ 7 station	Subang Jaya station	06:00	22:00	15 – 20 mins	
SKS Coachbuilders	SJ02	Pusat Bandar Puchong LRT station	SS18 LRT station	06:00	22:00	20 – 25 mins	Via Bandar Sunway.
SKS Coachbuilders	SJ03	Kinrara BK5 LRT station	SMK Bandar Puchong Jaya	06:00	22:00	30 mins	
SKS Coachbuilders	SJ04	Serdang Komuter	Serdang Hospital	06:00	22:00	25 – 30 mins	Via Serdang Jaya & UPM.
SKS Coachbuilders	SJ05	Terminal Putra Permai	Pangsapuri Bayu	06:00	22:00	30 mins	Via Bukit Serdang.

==== Klang Royal City Council (MBDK) ====
Operator	Route	Origin	Destination	First Trip	Last Trip	Frequency	Notes
Wawasan Sutera	KLG1	Bandar Klang	Hospital TAR	06:00	22:00	20 – 30 mins	
Rapid Bus	KLG2A	SJKC Kong Hoe	Taman Sri Pekan	06:00	22:00	25 – 30 mins	
Rapid Bus	KLG2B	SJKC Kong Hoe	Taman Intan	06:00	22:00	25 – 30 mins	
Wawasan Sutera	KLG3A	Taman Rakyat	Bandar Klang	06:00	22:00	25 – 30 mins	
Wawasan Sutera	KLG3B	Bandar Putera	Bandar Klang	06:00	22:00	30 – 40 mins	Via Jalan Raja Nong.
Wawasan Sutera	KLG3C	Bandar Putera	Bandar Klang	06:00	22:00	30 – 40 mins	Via Jalan Kebun.
Wawasan Sutera	KLG4	Klang Sentral	Taman Seri Kerayong	06:00	22:00	40 – 50 mins	

==== Petaling Jaya City Council (MBPJ) (Branded as PJ City Bus) ====
Operator	Route	Origin	Destination	First Trip	Last Trip	Frequency	Notes
Rapid Bus	PJ01	Terminal Taman Medan	PPUM	06:00	21:00	15 – 20 mins	Via Taman Jaya LRT station
Rapid Bus	PJ02	Taman Jaya LRT station	SS 2	06:00	21:00	15 – 20 mins	Via Jalan Bukit
Rapid Bus	PJ03	Taman Bahagia LRT station	SS 6 (Kelana Park View)	06:00	21:00	15 – 20 mins	
Rapid Bus	PJ04	Taman Bahagia LRT station	Sungai Way	06:00	21:00	15 – 20 mins	Via SS 2
Rapid Bus	PJ05	Bandar Utama bus hub	Taman Bahagia LRT station	06:00	21:00	15 – 20 mins	
Rapid Bus	PJ06	Bandar Utama bus hub	Damansara Damai (Residensi Suasana Damai)	06:00	21:00	15 – 20 mins	Via Bandar Sri Damansara

==== Ampang Jaya Municipal Council (MPAJ) ====
Operator	Route	Origin	Destination	First Trip	Last Trip	Frequency	Notes
Rapid Bus	AJ01	Ukay Perdana	Taman Melawati	06:00	22:00	30 mins	
Rapid Bus	AJ2A	Bandar Baru Ampang	Taman Dagang Jaya	06:00	22:00	30 mins	Via LRT Ampang/Cahaya.
Rapid Bus	AJ2B	Bandar Baru Ampang	Taman Dagang Jaya	06:00	22:00	30 mins	Via Aeon BiG & Pandan Mewah.
Rapid Bus	AJ03	Cempaka LRT station	Taman Bukit Teratai	06:00	22:00	30 mins	
Rapid Bus	AJ04	Pandan Height	Taman Lembah Maju	06:00	22:00	30 mins	

==== Kajang Municipal Council (MPKj) ====
Operator	Route	Origin	Destination	First Trip	Last Trip	Frequency	Notes
Rapid Bus	KJ01	Hentian Kajang	Bandar Kajang	06:00	22:00	15 – 20 mins	
Rapid Bus	KJ02	Bandar Bukit Mahkota	Bangi Komuter station	06:00	22:00	30 – 40 mins	
Rapid Bus	KJ03	Bandar Tun Hussein Onn MRT station	Taman Tun Perak	06:00	22:00	30 mins	Via Cheras Perdana.
Rapid Bus	KJ04	Hentian Kajang	Bandar Baru Bangi	06:00	22:00	30 mins	

===== Former Services =====
Operator	Route	Origin	Destination	Notes	Alternative Services
Rapid Bus	KJ04	Hentian Kajang	Dataran Gemilang, Putrajaya	Shortened to Bandar Baru Bangi due to low ridership	Rail services (MRT, KTM, KLIA Transit)
Rapid Bus	KJ05	Hentian Kajang	Bandar Baru Bangi via UKM	Discontinued during COVID-19 lockdown.	KJ04 (via Section 3 & 4 Bangi)

==== Selayang Municipal Council (MPS) ====
Operator	Route	Origin	Destination	First Trip	Last Trip	Frequency	Notes
Rapid Bus	MPS1	Selayang Mutiara	Gombak LRT station	06:00	22:00	30 – 45 mins	
Rapid Bus	MPS2A	Lotus's Rawang	Rawang Bus Terminal	06:00	22:00	30 – 45 mins	
Rapid Bus	MPS2B	Lotus's Rawang	Taman Garing Utama	06:00	22:00	45 mins	
Rapid Bus	MPS3	Batu Arang	Hospital Sungai Buloh	06:00	22:00	60 mins	Via Sungai Buloh station.
Rapid Bus	MPS4	Wangsa Permai	Hentian Stadium Selayang	06:00	22:00	60 mins	

==== Sepang Municipal Council (MPSp) ====
Operator	Route	Origin	Destination	First Trip	Last Trip	Frequency	Notes
Causeway Link	SPG1	Tanjung Sepat	KLIA / KLIA2	06:00	20:00	60 – 90 mins	Via Sungai Pelek.
Causeway Link	SPG2	Taman Salak Perdana	KLIA / KLIA2	06:00	22:00	30 – 45 mins	Via Kota Warisan & ERL Salak Tinggi.

===== Former Services =====
Operator	Route	Origin	Destination	Notes	Alternative Services
Causeway Link	SPG3	Pekan Salak	Cyberjaya via Dengkil	Discontinued due to low ridership	No alternative services between Salak Tinggi and Dengkil; T514B (Rapid-on-Demand van provides connectivity for Dengkil to KT3 PY41 Putrajaya Sentral)
Causeway Link	SPG4	Taman Seroja	IOI City Mall / Hospital Serdang	Discontinued due to low ridership	No alternative services between Salak Tinggi and Serdang; T466B (Rapid on-Demand van for Sg.Merab/UNITEN to Bangi); T568B (Rapid on-demand van for PY34 UPM MRT station to IOI City Mall)

==== Kuala Langat Municipal Council (MPKL) ====
Operator	Route	Origin	Destination	First Trip	Last Trip	Frequency	Notes
Rapid Bus	BTG01	Banting	KLIA2	06:00	22:00	45 – 60 mins	
Rapid Bus	BTG02	Banting	Taman Banting Baru	06:00	22:00	30 – 45 mins	

==== Kuala Selangor Municipal Council (MPKS) ====
Operator	Route	Origin	Destination	First Trip	Last Trip	Frequency	Notes
Wawasan Sutera	KS01	Kuala Selangor	Sekinchan	06:00	20:00	60 mins	Via Tanjung Karang.
Wawasan Sutera	KS02	Bandar Puncak Alam	Sungai Buloh station	06:00	22:00	30 – 45 mins	

==== Hulu Selangor Municipal Council (MPHS) ====
Operator	Route	Origin	Destination	First Trip	Last Trip	Frequency	Notes
SKS Coachbuilders	HS01	Kuala Kubu Bharu	Bukit Sentosa	06:00	20:00	90 mins	Via Rasa.
SKS Coachbuilders	HS02	Antara Gapi	Batang Kali railway station	06:30	20:00	75 – 90 mins	
SKS Coachbuilders	HS03A	Bukit Sentosa	Bandar Sungai Buaya	06:00	20:00	90 mins	
SKS Coachbuilders	HS03B	Bukit Sentosa	Serendah Komuter station	06:00	20:00	90 mins	
SKS Coachbuilders	HS04	Bukit Sentosa	Taman Bunga Raya	06:00	20:00	90 mins	

==== Sabak Bernam District Council (MDSB) ====
Operator	Route	Origin	Destination	First Trip	Last Trip	Frequency	Notes
Wawasan Sutera	SB01	Pekan Sabak	Sekinchan	06:00	19:00	60 – 90 mins	Via Sungai Besar.
Wawasan Sutera	SB02	Pekan Sabak	Parit Baru	06:00	19:00	60 – 90 mins	Via Sungai Air Tawar.
Wawasan Sutera	SB03	Pekan Sabak	Kampung Merbau Berdarah	06:00	19:00	60 – 90 mins	

== See also ==
- Go KL City Bus
- List of free public transport routes
