= Bukit Sentosa =

Township in Hulu Selangor, Selangor, Malaysia

- Town
- Interactive map of Bukit Sentosa
- Coordinates: 3°24′10″N 101°33′33″E
- Country: Malaysia
- District: Hulu Selangor
- Time zone: MST (UTC+8)

Bukit Sentosa is a township in the district of Hulu Selangor. It is accessible from the North–South Expressway via Bukit Beruntung interchange exit 118 and Sungai Choh and Rasa via Federal Route 1.

The township was developed by Talam Corporation.

== History ==
An extension of Bukit Sentosa, Bukit Sentosa II, was developed through a joint venture of Talam Corporation and Noble Rights Sdn Bhd; the latter owns 60% stake in the joint-venture and was responsible for the project. It is located next to the Perodua car factory. The extension project spans over 214 hectares; the land was owned by Noble Land Finance Cooperative and was bought by Noble Rights at RM 39.69 million. Bukit Sentosa II was expected to begin construction in late 1995 and be completed by 2002.

In the early 2010s, Bukit Sentosa went on a property boom due to the opening of a Tesco supermarket in the township.

== Transportation ==
=== Car ===
Bukit Sentosa is accessible to the North–South Expressway through Bukit Beruntung Interchange. The Klang-Banting Highway Federal Route 3208 (Jalan Bukit Beruntung) runs on the western boundary of the town, towards Sungai Choh.

=== Public transportation ===
Bukit Sentosa Bus Terminal

Bukit Sentosa itself have a bus terminal, that connects the place with KTM Kuala Kubu Bharu and KTM Rasa via Smart Selangor Bus HS01, with HS03 and HS04 connect to Sungai Buaya and Taman Bunga Raya, Bukit Beruntung respectively. MARA Liner operates a bus route to Rawang, 156 through Jalan Bukit Beruntung while an express intercity bus is available to Kuala Lumpur and other towns in the peninsular.

== See also ==
- Bukit Beruntung
