= Lembah Beringin =

Township in Hulu Selangor, Selangor, Malaysia

Coordinates: 3.5720°N 101.5360°E

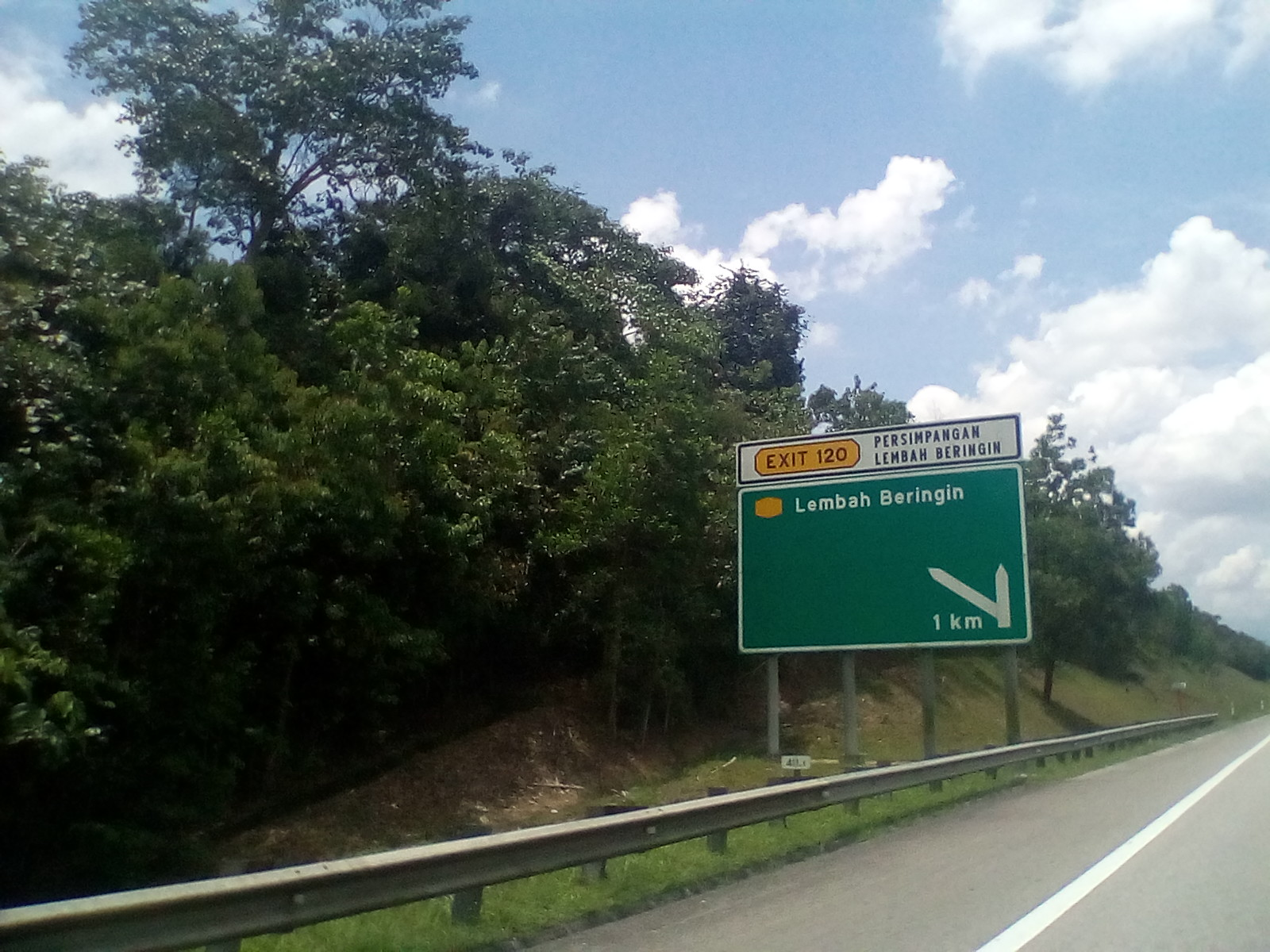
- Lembah Beringin Interchange
- Interactive map of Lembah Beringin
- Country: Malaysia
- State: Selangor
- District: Hulu Selangor
- Mukim: Kuala Kalumpang, Sungai Gumut, Kerling

Lembah Beringin is a township in Hulu Selangor District, Selangor, Malaysia. The township is located next to the Bukit Tarek forest reserve in Lembah Bernam and was developed as a 70:30 joint venture of Land & General and Kuala Lumpur Kepong.

The township is under the jurisdiction of Hulu Selangor Municipal Council.

== History ==
Plans for the then-unnamed township began in April 1993, with the township expected to be completed within 25 to 50 years.

In June 1994, it was announced that Lembah Beringin would be developed as a "green concept township". The first phase would have 477 units of homesteads on 200 hectares of land, with each unit having their own fruit orchards, the first to be offered by a township in Malaysia.

The township, under Land & General's subsidiary company Lembah Beringin Sdn. Bhd., had developed over 2,300 units of houses of various types, comprising bungalows, semi-D, terrace houses, and shophouses were developed, spanning 6,800 acres (2,800 ha). Lembah Beringin Sdn. Bhd. faced financial difficulties and was liquidated in 2006.

Over the years, more and more people have moved in, attracted by the cheap rent and cheap property prices. A single-story 3-bedded terrace house can be purchased for RM 50,000 (2015).

Lembah Beringin was home to SSG Beringin Golf Club, an 18-hole, 5,897 m, par 72 courses designed by Ted Parslow. The golf club has ceased operations due to effects of COVID-19 pandemic in Malaysia. Kolej Yayasan UEM, a fully residential college, is also located in this township. KYUEM, established in 1998, offers A-Levels courses to prepare students for university education.

To cater to the increasing population, a primary school, Sekolah Kebangsaan Lembah Beringin, was built. In 2012, a surau and a futsal court were added adjacent to the school. A new 15 km water pipeline from Kerling, Selangor to Lembah Beringin in Hulu Selangor was completed in 2014.

== Ghost Town ==
The tragedy started in the 1990s when Malaysia's economy was thriving. Many developers rushed to building projects and buyers were eager to buy up anything they could get their hands on. Driven by the rumors that the new Kuala Lumpur International Airport (KLIA) was going to be built around the Hulu Selangor district, developers started to build projects across the area including Lembah Beringin, Sungai Buaya, and Bukit Beruntung. However, the KLIA ended up being built at Sepang, 100km away from the area. The crisis soon started in the late 1990s with the Asian Financial Crisis 1997 that shook the whole region including Malaysia. The Lembah Beringin Sdn. Bhd. company was among the ones who had been hit hard by this crisis. Soon the development of Lembah Beringin was halted even though the project was supposed to be completed by 1998. On 31 December 2001, the Ministry of Housing and Local Government (KPKT) has classified Bandar Baru Lembah Beringin as an abandoned project. It was estimated more than 1000 buildings were on the brickwork stage had to be left unfinished in that area.

== Transportation ==
=== Car ===
North–South Expressway Northern Route, 120 serves Lembah Beringin.
