= Selangor River =

River in Selangor, Malaysia

Coordinates: 3°21′N 101°14′E

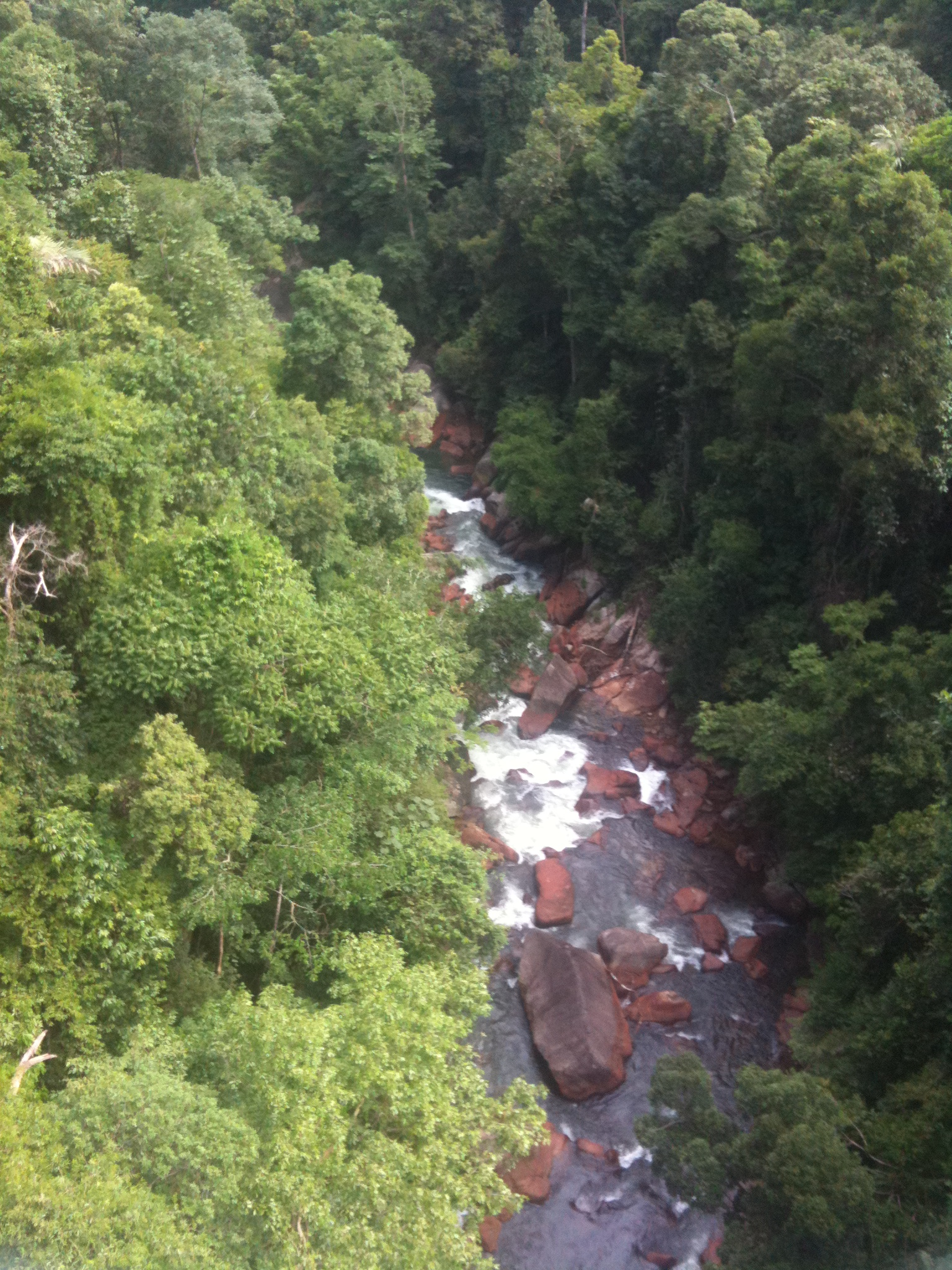
- View of the headwaters of the Selangor River
- Native name: Sungai Selangor (Malay)

Location
- Country: Malaysia
- State: Selangor

The Selangor River (Malay: Sungai Selangor) is a major river in Selangor, Malaysia. It runs from Kuala Kubu Bharu on the western foothills of the Selangorean/Pahangese Titiwangsa in the east and empties into the Straits of Malacca at Kuala Selangor in the west.

== Water resources ==
The Selangor River basin is the largest resource of water in Selangor and Kuala Lumpur, providing around 60 percent of the drinking water in the two areas. There are two water supply dams in the basin, the Tinggi and Selangor Dams, which were constructed in 1996 and 2002, respectively.

== Towns along the river basin ==
- Peretak, Hulu Selangor
- Kuala Kubu Bharu
- Ampang Pechah
- Rasa
- Batang Kali
- Bukit Beruntung
- Bestari Jaya (Batang Berjuntai)
- Kuala Selangor

== See also ==
- Geography of Malaysia
- List of rivers of Malaysia
