= Malaysia Federal Route 1208 =

Road in Malaysia

Federal Route 1208
- Jalan Sungai Buaya
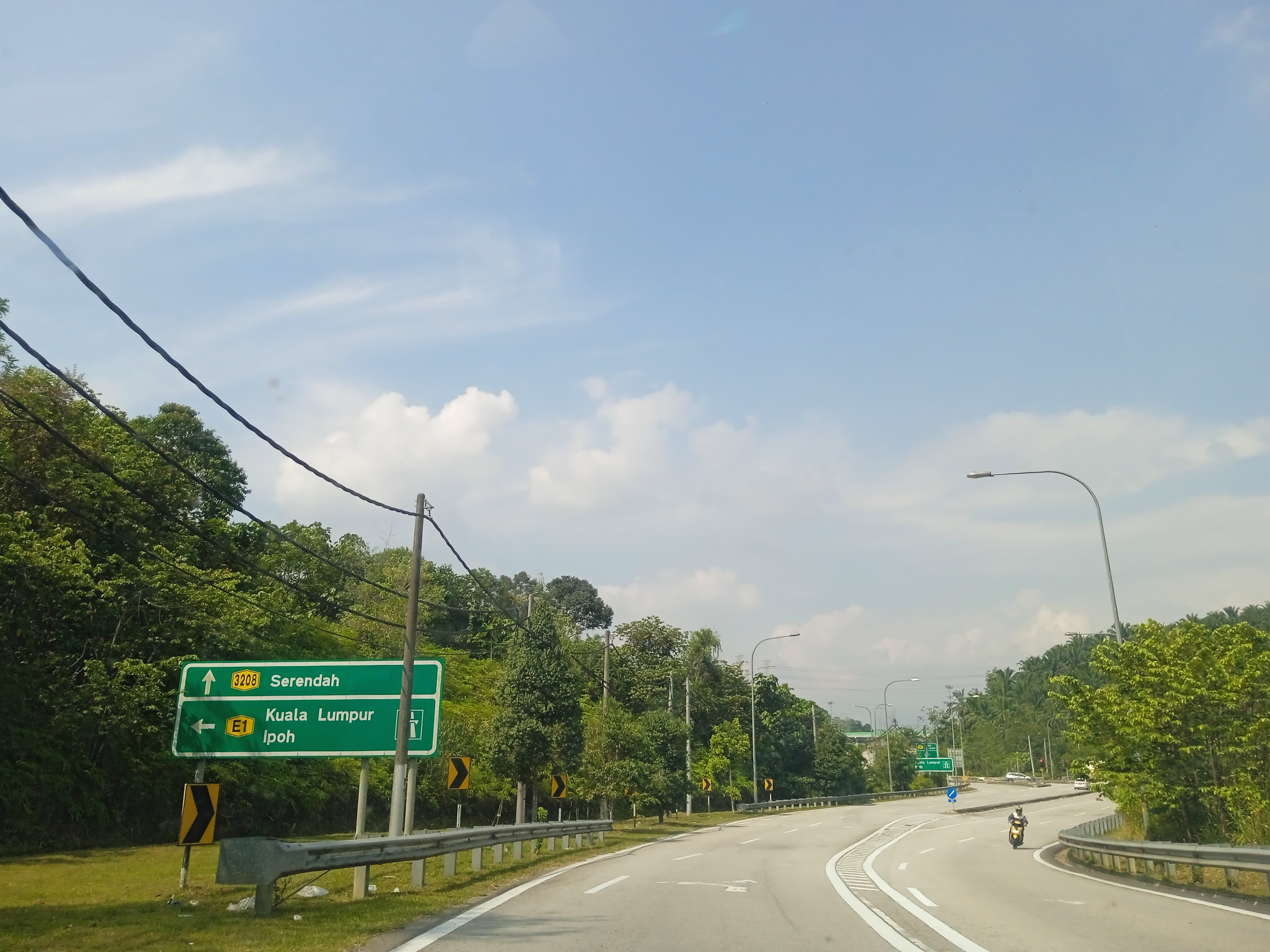

Route information
- Maintained by Malaysian Public Works Department

Major junctions
- East end: FT 3208 Jalan Bukit Beruntung
- FT 3208 Jalan Bukit Beruntung; North–South Expressway Northern Route / AH2
- West end: Kampung Sungai Guntong

Location
- Country: Malaysia
- Primary destinations: Bandar Sungai Buaya, Sungai Buaya

Highway system
- Highways in Malaysia; Expressways; Federal; State

Jalan Sungai Buaya, Federal Route 1208, is a federal road in Selangor, Malaysia. The Kilometre Zero is located at the road's junction with Jalan Bukit Beruntung.

At most sections, the Federal Route 1208 was built to the JKR R5 road standard, with a speed limit of 90 km/h.

== Junction lists ==
The entire route is located in Hulu Selangor District, Selangor.

Location	km	mi	Name	Destinations	Notes
Sungai Buaya	0.0	0.0	Jalan Bukit Beruntung	FT 3208 Jalan Bukit Beruntung – Bukit Beruntung, Serendah, Batang Kali, Rawang, Genting Highlands; North–South Expressway Northern Route / AH2 – Bukit Kayu Hitam, Ipoh, Kuala Lumpur, Klang	T-junctions
Sungai Buaya			Sungai Serendah bridge		
Sungai Buaya			Sungai Buaya-NSE	North–South Expressway Northern Route / AH2 – Bukit Kayu Hitam, Ipoh, Kuala Lumpur, Klang	T-junctions
Sungai Buaya			Bandar Sungai Buaya		
Sungai Buaya			Sungai Buaya		
Sungai Buaya			Kampung Sungai Guntong		
1.000 mi = 1.609 km; 1.000 km = 0.621 mi
