= Kalumpang =

- Mukim
- Kalumpang in Hulu Selangor District

- Location in Malaysia
- Coordinates: 3°39′00″N 101°33′00″E
- Country: Malaysia
- State: Selangor
- District: Hulu Selangor

Kalumpang is a mukim in Hulu Selangor District, Selangor, Malaysia.

One of the two dumpsites owned by Hulu Selangor Municipal Council is located here; the other being at Bukit Tagar.
