= Bukit Beruntung =

Township in Hulu Selangor, Selangor, Malaysia

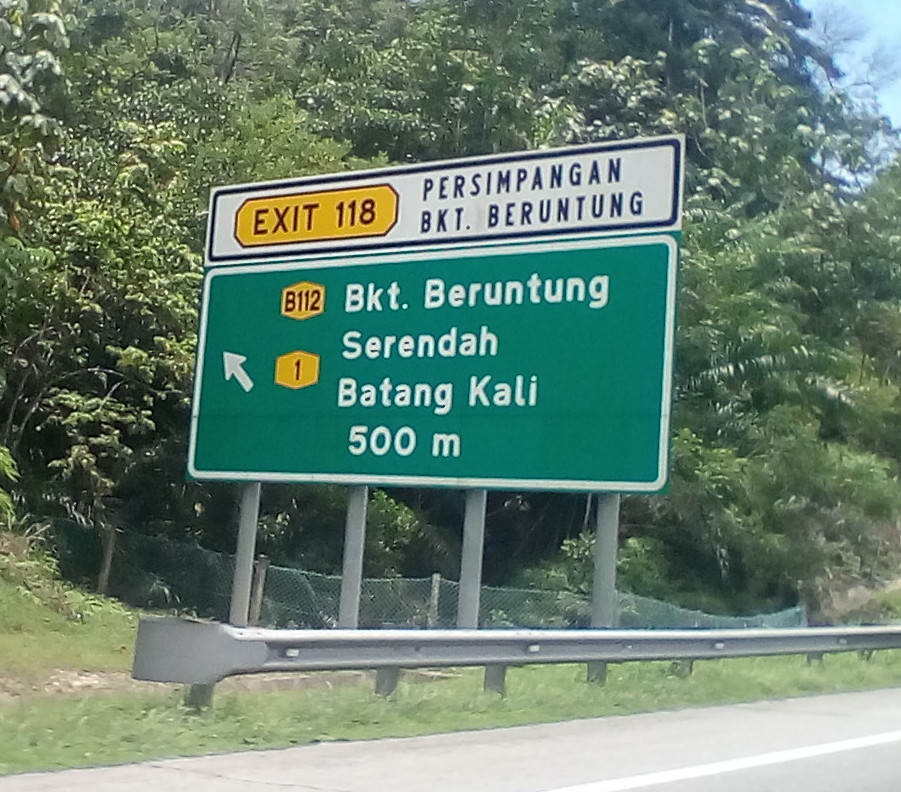
- Bukit Beruntung Interchange

- Location in Peninsular Malaysia Bukit Beruntung (Peninsular Malaysia) Bukit Beruntung (Malaysia)
- Coordinates: 3°25′27.6″N 101°33′20.1″E
- Country: Malaysia
- State: Selangor
- Establishment: 1992
- Time zone: UTC+8 (MST)
- Postcode: 48300
- Area code: +603-602

Bukit Beruntung is a town in Mukim Serendah, Hulu Selangor District, Selangor, Malaysia. It spans over 2,900 hectares between Serendah and Batang Kali, bordered by the Rantau Panjang forest reserve. The planned city was originally developed by Europlus Corporation and is home to the Bukit Beruntung Golf & Country Club.

== History ==
The land clearing for the construction of Bukit Beruntung Golf & Country Club and the houses surrounding the area happened around April 1992, with the earliest golf courses completed in late 1993.

== Infrastructure ==
It is accessible via a Bukit Beruntung Interchange 118 of the PLUS Expressway, as well as the Federal Route 3208 Jalan Bukit Beruntung trunk road from Sg. Choh (after the JKR Hulu Selangor border sign and the Petronas station) and a shortcut road from Rasa.

In terms of public transportation, the closest rail stations are KTM Serendah and KTM Batang Kali.

== Industrial Area ==
In recent years, various corporations have opened factories, warehouses, and manufacturing sites in the Bukit Beruntung industrial area.

- Perodua Manufacturing Sdn Bhd
- Perodua Engine Manufacturing Sdn Bhd
- Perodua Global Manufacturing Sdn Bhd
- Perodua Daihatsu Kawamura-Kako Manufacturing (PDKM) Sdn Bhd
- Givi Asia Sdn Bhd (Safety Equipment & Clothing)
- Fuji Seats (M) Sdn Bhd (Transportation Equipment)
- APM Automotive Holding Berhad
- Apm Plastics Sdn Bhd
- INGRESS TECHNOLOGIES SDN. BHD
- Riverstone Resources Sdn Bhd
- Tanjong Express (M) Sdn Bhd
- UMW Aerospace Sdn Bhd
- LONGi Malaysia (Serendah) Sdn Bhd

== Residential area ==
- Taman Semarak
- Taman Tanjung
- Taman Seroja
- Taman Kasturi
- Taman Mawar
- Apartment Seri Kembangan
- Apartment Seri Tanjung
- Apartment Seri Seroja
- Apartment Seri Trompet
- Apartment Seri Lili
- Apartment Sri Teluki
- Apartment Sri Semarak
- Taman Melor
- Taman Inai
- Apartment Melur
- Apartment Kekwa
- Taman Kekwa
- Taman Adenium
- Taman Bunga Kertas
- Apartment Kenanga
- Apartment Dahlia
- Apartment Cempaka
- Apartment Buginvila
- Apartment Mawar
- Apartment Anggerik
- Apartment Teratai
- Apartment Kemuning
- Jalan Iris
- Jalan Freesia
- Prima Beruntung

== Facilities ==
- Post office
- Clinic (Klinik Komuniti)
- Police station
- Religious Elementary School
- Fire and Rescue station

== Features ==
It is accessible and it is a community that works together in ensuring the safety of its surroundings and the environment. There is a TESCO warehouse, a golf and country club, a main local supermarket, gas stations, clinics, elementary schools, secondary schools and a Public Bank branch. It has the main mosque as well as other places of worship for other community members. Local stores and a wet market are an important part of this community as well. It is a developing community as there is a lot of lands left unowned.

== Education ==
- Sekolah Kebangsaan Bukit Sentosa
- Sekolah Kebangsaan Bukit Beruntung
- Sekolah Kebangsaan Bukit Beruntung 2
- Sekolah Rendah Islam Integrasi Al-Amin Bukit Beruntung
- Sekolah Jenis Kebangsaan (T) Bukit Beruntung
- Sekolah Jenis Kebangsaan (C) Bukit Tangga
- Sekolah Menengah Kebangsaan Bukit Sentosa
- Sekolah Menengah Kebangsaan Bukit Sentosa 2
- Sekolah Kebangsaan Taman Bunga Raya (1)
- Sekolah Kebangsaan Taman Bunga Raya (2)

== Higher Education ==
- Septronic Skills Training College, Bukit Beruntung -- http://www.septronic.edu.my/

== See also ==
- Bukit Sentosa
- Batang Kali
- Rasa
- Kuala Kubu Bharu
- Sg. Choh
- Rawang
- Serendah
