= Bandar Sungai Buaya =

Township in Hulu Selangor, Selangor, Malaysia

Coordinates: 3°22′31.1″N 101°31′58.2″E

Bandar Sungai Buaya, also known as Bandar Baru Sungai Buaya, is a township in the Hulu Selangor district of Selangor, Malaysia. Located near Rawang, the township is accessible via the main road (Federal Route 1208), which connects to the industrial areas and other housing areas and a North-South Expressway interchange nearby.

The township began constructions in 1996 under the developer Bandar Sungai Buaya Sdn Bhd, which ended its operations in 2008. The ownership of Bandar Sungai Buaya has since been handed over to Murna Jaya Development Berhad.

Among the housing areas in the township include Melatisari, Cemperaisari, Imaisari and Kasturisari.

A village of the same name, Kampung Sungai Buaya, is also located here on another road. It was once a Felda settlement.

Sungai Buaya gets its name from the legend of a white crocodile who is said to have lived there and witnessed by Sungai Buaya settlers.
