= Kolej Yayasan UEM =

College in Hulu Selangor, Selangor, Malaysia

UEM Foundation College
- Kolej Yayasan UEM (KYUEM) کوليج يايسن يو.إي.عيم

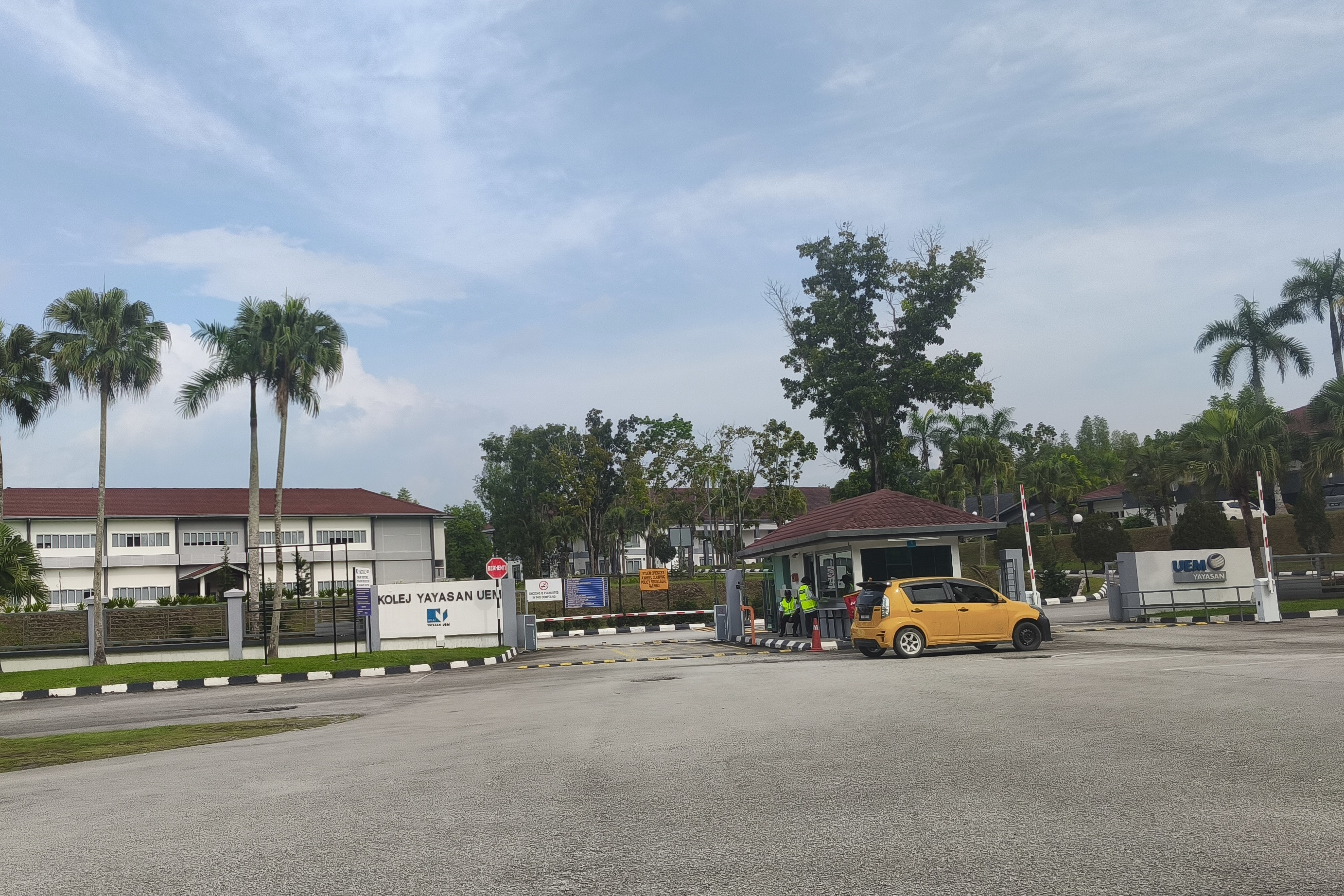

Location
- Lembah Beringin, Selangor, 44100; Malaysia
- Coordinates: 3.5611°N 101.5389°E

Information
- Type: Private boarding school
- Motto: Knowledge Is The Road To Truth
- Established: 1998 (27 years ago)
- Founder: Tan Sri Halim Saad
- Chief Executive Officer: Mazyu Sherina Yusof
- Headmaster: Kasthuri Thilaga Munikrishnan (Apr 2025 - present)
- Staff: 160 approx.
- Gender: Boys and girls
- Age: 16 to 20
- Enrollment: 524 approx
- Houses: 4 (Diamond, Garnet, Sapphire, Topaz)
- Colours: White and blue
- Website: www.kyuem.edu.my

Kolej Yayasan UEM or KYUEM (formerly known as Kolej Matrikulasi Yayasan Saad) is a Malaysian private boarding school in Lembah Beringin, Selangor, Malaysia.

It was planned by Tan Sri Halim Saad as Kolej Matrikulasi Yayasan Saad (its former name), designed as a residential college modeled after British boarding schools.

It offers an A-Level program under the Cambridge Assessment International Education examination board. It is owned by Yayasan UEM and is a part of the UEM Group.

== Overview ==
KYUEM boards about 525 students, mostly between the ages of 16 and 20. The college is led by a headmaster, who is appointed by the Board of Governors and the Board of Trustees. Each house is overseen by a houseparent, typically selected from the teaching or administrative staff.

Almost all of the school's graduates achieve conditional offers into universities through the UCAS application process, several to Oxford or Cambridge every year and a majority to universities such as University College London, Imperial College London, University of Warwick, London School of Economics, King's College London, University of Edinburgh and The University of Manchester. Some of the graduates studied at universities in the United States such as MIT, UC Berkeley, Princeton University, and Harvard University.

== Curriculum ==
In addition to the core A-level subjects, students must take the IELTS as it is an admissions criteria for universities in the United Kingdom.

Most students at the school take four A-level subjects, but many also take three. The A-Level subjects offered are:

- by the Arts Department – Accounting, Economics, English Literature, History, and Geography.
- by the Science Department – Biology, Chemistry, Physics, and Marine Science.
- by Mathematics Department – Mathematics and Further Mathematics.

== See also ==
- Education in Malaysia
- List of post-secondary institutions in Malaysia
- List of schools in Selangor
