= Peretak =

- Mukim
- Location of Peretak (red, top right) in Hulu Selangor District

- Location in Selangor
- Country: Malaysia
- State: Selangor
- District: Hulu Selangor District

Area
  - Total: 203.3 km^{2} (78.5 sq mi)

Population (2020)
  - Total: 467
  - Density: 2.30/km^{2} (5.95/sq mi)
- Time zone: UTC+8 (MST)
- Postal code: 44000
- Area code: +6-03

Peretak is a mukim in Hulu Selangor District, Selangor, Malaysia. It is located along the route from Kuala Kubu Bharu to Fraser's Hill and is known for its natural landscapes and river recreational areas.

The mukim encompasses four Permanent Forest Reserves (Malay: Hutan Simpanan Kekal), namely Hulu Selangor, Semangko, Semangko Tambahan (Extension), and Bukit Kutu, which serve as water catchment areas and wildlife habitats. The Selangor River Dam is located within the Hulu Selangor Forest Reserve.

== Geography ==
Peretak is situated in the mountainous and forested eastern region of the Hulu Selangor District. It is located approximately:

- 9 km from the district capital, Kuala Kubu Bharu.
- 13 km from the hill station of Fraser's Hill.

The area serves as a key node connecting the lowlands to the highlands. Malaysia Federal Route 55 (Jalan Kuala Kubu Bharu–Teranum) runs through the mukim, serving as the main access route to Fraser's Hill.

== Demographics ==
As of 2020, the mukim has a total area of 203.3 square kilometres (78.5 sq mi) and a population of 467. The population density is extremely low as the majority of the land consists of forest reserves and water catchment areas.

The local population consists primarily of Orang Asli (indigenous people), who mainly reside in the Peretak Orang Asli Village (Kampung Orang Asli Peretak).

== Tourist attractions ==
Peretak is rich in eco-tourism resources and is a popular spot for weekend outings and camping:

- Semangkuk Waterfall (Air Terjun Semangkuk): A stream and small waterfall located prominently by the roadside.
- Peretak River (Sungai Peretak): An upstream tributary of the Selangor River. It is known for its clear water suitable for picnics and swimming. It also serves as the entrance point for hiking Bukit Kutu.

== See also ==
- Hulu Selangor District
- Kuala Kubu Bharu
- Fraser's Hill
