= Rawang, Selangor =

Town in Malaysia

Rawang
- Town
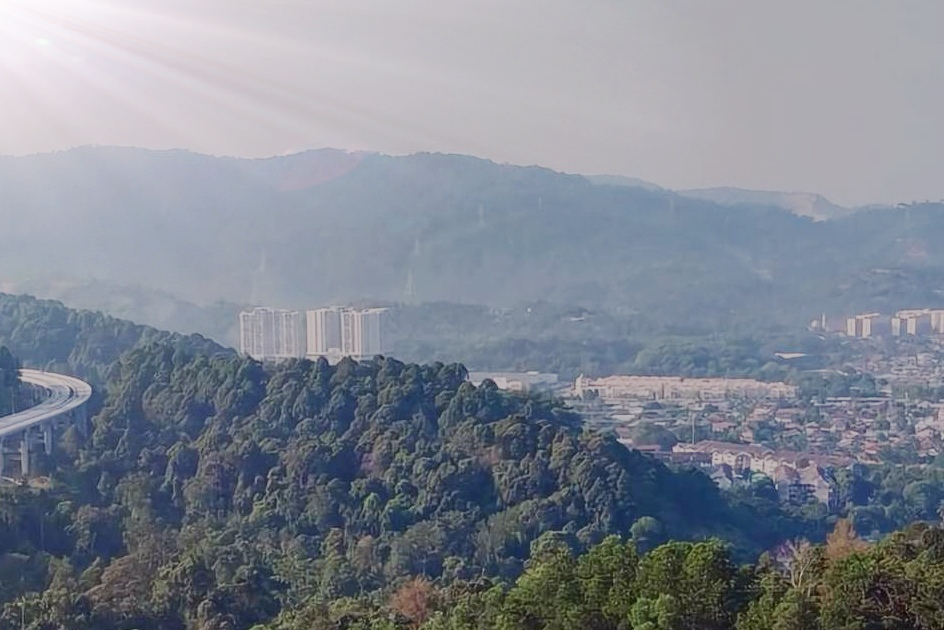
- Rawang Skyline
- Etymology: Malay: Rawang ("swampy forest")
- Rawang in Gombak District

- Location in Selangor Location in Malaysia#
- Coordinates: 3°19′N 101°35′E
- Country: Malaysia
- State: Selangor Darul Ehsan
- District: Gombak District
- Establish: 1825

Area
  - Total: 545.6 km^{2} (210.7 sq mi)

Population
  - Total: 199,095
- Time zone: UTC+08:00 (MST)
- Postcode: 48000
- Telephone area code: +6-03

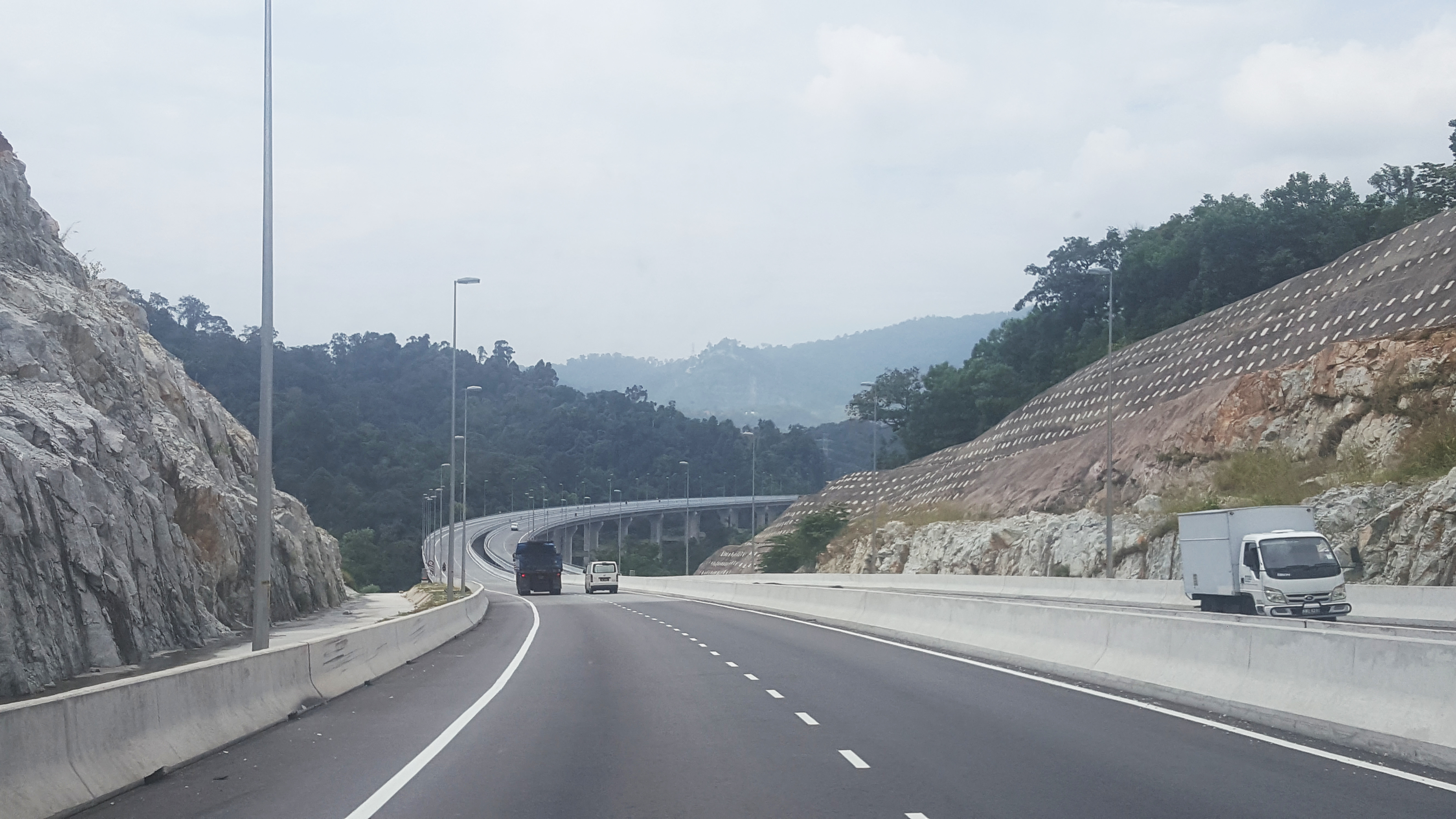
Rawang Bypass, the tallest bridge in Malaysia

Rawang is a town in the Gombak District of Selangor, Malaysia, located about 25 km northwest of Kuala Lumpur. It began as a tin mining town and has grown into a significant urban area within Greater Kuala Lumpur.

Rawang used to be the capital of Gombak District until it was moved to Bandar Baru Selayang in 1997.

== History ==
=== Early history ===
Rawang was founded in the early 19th century and was one of

Kuala Lumpur's earliest satellite towns. During the initial tin mining growth of Kuala Lumpur, many tin mines were explored and opened north of Kuala Lumpur, starting initially at the Ulu Kelang area and gradually moving northwards past Selayang and towards Rawang. APMC's Rawang's cement plant was the nation's first and oldest cement plant had taken over from the tin mine dredges in the 1950s when they moved onward to Batang Berjuntai. The unused open-cast tin mines made way for the limestone quarry in 1976.

The earliest estimates of Rawang's founding date back to 1825. It was the second area in Selangor to be explored for tin mining. The tin mining industry in Rawang developed concurrently at around the same time as the larger tin mines in Perak.

During the Selangor Civil War of the 1860s and 1870s, Yap Ah Loy's gangs who were aligned with Tengku Kudin repelled Syed Mashor's troops away from Kuala Lumpur and pushed them further north. During the Battle of Rawang in 1871, Syed Mashor's followers and Chinese gangs loyal to him (led by Chong Chong) ended up being pushed up towards Serendah and Kuala Kubu Bharu, with Yap Ah Loy's men (led by Chung Piang) holding their ground at Rawang. Thus, Rawang became an unofficial boundary of Tengku Kudin's dominance in the northern Klang Valley during the war.

In 1894, the first electric generator in British Malaya was installed in Rawang to support the mining industry, making Rawang the first location to be electrified in Malaysia. Numerous electrified tin mines were operated by Loke Yew and K. Thamboosamy Pillay, who both contributed significantly to the growth of Rawang. With Rawang being the first town in Malaya to utilize electricity for tin mining, it was also the first town to have electric street lights, and the Rawang Railway Station was the first railway station in Malaya that had an electricity supply to power the lamps and fans.

When World War II struck, Rawang was defeated by the Japanese, and the tin mining sector rapidly deteriorated. After the war, the Rawang New Village (one such is now known as Kampung Sungai Terentang) was established by the British in 1951 during the Emergency. By this time, the Chinese population of Rawang also had a sizable percentage of Cantonese in addition to the Hakkas and Hokkiens.

In its early days, Rawang was known primarily for its tin mining industry, making it one of the earliest mining areas in Malaysia. However, after the tin industry declined in the mid-20th century, the town transitioned to rubber and palm oil plantations. By the 1970s, private companies had established vast palm oil estates, and Rawang began to diversify economically.

=== Recent history ===
Templer Park Country Club, located outside Rawang, opened in August 1990, and was developed by joint-venture company Kyowa Kanko Kaihatsu (M) Sdn Bhd, a subsidiary by Kyowa Group of Japan. The club had floodlit fairways.

IGB and the Selangor State Development Corporation constructed a 400-hectare residential-cum-industrial area in Rawang, at a total cost of RM 169 million. It was expected to be completed in 1997.

Malaysian Oxygen opened a hydrogen plant in 1992.

In 1994, Asia Pacific Land acquired more than 1,000 hectares of land in Rawang from New Selangor Plantations Sdn Bhd for RM 98 million and plans to develop a township for RM 4 billion.

The redevelopment of a 18.8 hectare portion of Rawang, located along the north–south corridor, was made by a subsidiary company jointly owned by Shah Alam Properties Sdn Bhd and Ciri Urus Sdn Bhd. The redevelopment project, which began in 1996, was to upgrade the economic status of the population.

== Commerce ==
The tin mining industry in Rawang picked up again in the 1950s. Rubber estates were also established around Rawang during this time. In 1953, the first cement factory in Malaya, Rawang Works, was launched by the Associated Pan Malayan Cement Company, APMC (now YTL Cement) and took over much of the land vacated from the tin mining industry which had moved westwards to Batang Berjuntai (now Bestari Jaya). It also made Rawang one of the earliest towns in Malaysia to produce agricultural, natural resources, and cement output simultaneously. The Lafarge Cement factory was bought over by YTL Cement but subsequently closed down in 2020 due to the high cost of production but it still has high value due to the land-bank option for future development.

Tin and rubber were major economic outputs of Rawang until the late 1970s, after which oil palm plantations started being established by private companies. Throughout the late 1980s until the 1990s, Rawang's economic output continued to diversify, and many light industrial areas opened up during Malaysia's industrialization drive under the Fifth Malaysia Plan (RMK-5). During this period, Industrial zones set up at Sungai Dua and Rawang Perdana generated jobs, which resulted in further population growth and an increase in foreign migrant workers residing in Rawang. The influx of foreign workers has transformed the landscape and composition of the industrial estates and townships.

== Administration ==
In 1974, following Kuala Lumpur's separation from Selangor, a re-delineation exercise for that year's general election saw Rawang transferred from Hulu Selangor to Gombak (i.e. Selayang constituency). At the same time, Rawang township (parish) was transferred to the newly created Gombak District and acted as the administrative center of the district. While northern part of Rawang including Bukit Beruntung, Bukit Sentosa, Serendah and Sungai Choh remained in Hulu Selangor District until now.

Rawang was the capital of Gombak until 1997 when it moved to Batu Caves and is now a major administrative center for the district of Selayang. Rawang has undergone tremendous growth since the PLUS North-South Highway was opened in the mid-1990s. The population of Rawang stands at 120,447, according to the GeoNames geographical database. The Selayang Municipal Council building is situated at the new Rawang town center that was established in the early 2000s, slightly north of the old Rawang town.

The District Magistrate's subordinate Court and the District Police Headquarters moved away to Selayang from Rawang in the 1990s, while the town library and government-run public clinic were decommissioned. With this, the town now lacks playing fields and parks to support all-around growth as before. The large land area in which the magistrate court, library, police quarters, and government clinic used to reside was redeveloped as the new Rawang town center, which has become congested due to poor town planning. It has also become a primary place for local and migrant Rohingya beggars.

Until the mid-2000s, the borders of Rawang has greatly expanded to encompass the rubber estates outside Serendah to the north (now the townships of Bukit Beruntung and Bukit Sentosa) and Sungai Bakau and parts of Kundang to the west (now the townships of Bandar Tasik Puteri, Bandar Country Homes, Emerald West, and Anggun Rawang). To sustain the growth in size, the PLUS North–south highway has now been complemented by the E35 Guthrie Corridor Expressway (linking Rawang to Shah Alam), E25 Kuala Lumpur–Kuala Selangor Expressway (linking Rawang to Kuala Selangor) and Rawang–Serendah bypass that replaces an earlier Outer Ring Road proposal.

== Demography ==
The population of Rawang currently stands at 199,095 over 1065.7 square kilometers. (Source: https://dewan.selangor.gov.my/question/jumlah-dan-kepadatan-penduduk/) Formerly, besides tin mines, Rawang also had large swathes of rubber estates on the outskirts of the town. Consequently, Rawang had a significant population of Chinese and Indian pioneers, which, combined with the Malay population, made Rawang a vibrant and diverse multi-racial town since the early 20th century. This is reflected in the presence of Malay, English, Tamil, and Chinese primary schools in close proximity to one another since the early days. The development in the 1980s and the clearing of plantations for housing brought about problems related to displaced workers and social problems of its own to Rawang and the issues related to gangsterism and crime.

The Sze Yeah Kong Temple (万挠师爷宫) was founded by the Hakka immigrants in 1869 as one of the primary Chinese temples in Rawang. Hakka and Hokkien immigrants dominated the tin mining sector in Rawang until the 1930s, during which Rawang continued growing at a rapid pace. There is also another old Chinese Temple known as Kam Yin Teng Temple (万挠感应亭), which was built in 1865.

The Tamil-Indian community was made up mostly of cement factory and plantation workers, including small businesses ranging from textile and silverware merchants to barbers and restaurants. The primary Hindu temple in Rawang, the Sri Veerakathy Vinayagar temple, was built along Jalan Welman in 1943. It is less than 100 meters from the Sze Yeah Kong Chinese temple.

Rawang also has a Sikh community, originally opposite the Kampung Kenanga area is Kampung Benggali (Kampung Khalsa). The Rawang Sikh gurdwara (Gurdwara Sahib Rawang) was built in 1938, not far from the Rawang railway station now located at Rawang Tin. The St. Jude's Church, inaugurated in 1957, is situated at Jalan Lim Kak, Rawang. It caters to the needs of the Catholics in and around Rawang. St. Jude's Church St. Jude's feast, held in October each year, draws a large crowd from all over the country. Rawang is one of the few towns in Malaysia with a Gurkha population and a settlement. They are descendants of Nepali-Gurkha military personnel whom the British brought in.

The Malay community of Rawang initially resided in two traditional villages that bordered the town center, which were mainly resettled into Kampung Kenanga in the late 1960s and Kampung Melayu in the 1980s. A mosque served the religious needs of the Malay community located in Kampung Kenanga in 1969. Due to population growth, a new mosque was constructed at Kampung Melayu Batu 16. In 1971, the mosque was upgraded into a Masjid Jamek and was officiated by the Sultan of Selangor on 5 March 1971 with the new name of Masjid Jamek Nurul Iman Rawang. The Malay community is now distributed in all the housing colonies in Rawang.

In recent decades, Rawang has continued to evolve as a dynamic urban center, attracting investment in residential, commercial, and infrastructure projects. The town's population has grown significantly, driven by factors such as urbanization, migration, and the expansion of Greater Kuala Lumpur. This tide has put tremendous strain on existing infrastructure, including the influx of Rohingya refugees and other social-economic problems that have gone unmonitored by the local authorities.

== Members of Parliament ==
1959–1964: Liu Yoong Peng (Socialist Front)

1964–1969: Tunku Abdullah Tuanku Abdul Rahman (Alliance, UMNO)

1969–1971: Parliament Suspended

1971-–1974: Tunku Abdullah Tuanku Abdul Rahman (BN, UMNO)

Constituency delineated, renamed to Selayang.

1974–1975: Walter Loh Poh Khan (BN, MCA)

1975–1978: Rosemary Chow Poh Kheng (BN, MCA)

1978–1982: Rafidah Aziz (BN, UMNO)

1982–1986: Rahmah Othman (BN, UMNO)

1986–1995: Zaleha Ismail (BN, UMNO)

1995–2008: Chan Kong Choy (BN, MCA)

2008–present: William Leong Jee Keen (PH, PKR)

== Representatives in the Selangor State Assembly ==
1974–1982: Lee Kim Sai (BN, MCA) 2 Terms

1982–2008: Tang See Hang (BN, MCA) 6 Terms

2008–2018: Gan Pei Nei (PH, PKR) 2 Terms

2018–present: Chua Wei Kiat (PH, PKR) 2 Terms

== Town Council and Management ==
The Majlis Perbandaran Selayang (MPS) is the town council responsible for Rawang. Due to its extremely large administrative area and population, it covers an area of 545.6 square km and has 3 sub-districts: Rawang Subdistrict, Batu Subdistrict, and Setapak Subdistrict. It borders Hulu Selangor District Council, Shah Alam City Council, Ampang Jaya Municipal Council, and Kuala Lumpur City Hall.

The administration has shown significant deterioration in the management of facilities and utilities. Many town streetlights do not work, and roads are poorly maintained. There are frequent flash floods in Rawang Town on Maxwell Road and other poorly maintained facilities and grounds.

The Rawang Town Center has large tracts of secondary bushes that are not maintained and could easily be used for additional parking. There are also many illegal loan shark and for-sale posters throughout the town and adjacent housing colonies with no enforcement. The Rawang State assemblyperson under the ruling Government seems inept to fix and overcome these persistent and perennial issues that affect the residents.

== Location ==
One must drive about 25 minutes from Kuala Lumpur to reach the town center. One can choose to take the Rawang Interchange 116 from the North–South Expressway Northern Route, the Guthrie Corridor Expressway from Rawang South Interchange 115, the Kuala Lumpur–Kuala Selangor Expressway from Rawang South Interchange 115, the B27 Jalan Rawang–Bestari Jaya
from Batang Berjuntai, or the trunk road to Rawang.

On the trunk road, passengers are able to see Templer Park, Hutan Lipur Sg. Kanching, and the Commonwealth Forest Park. These are all the remnants of the forest reserves that have been logged out or developed for more unsold housing. The forest is a hot spot for jungle trekking and camping. The trees along the roads at Templer Park have been cleared for the construction of more houses, and the slopes are left bare with much erosion. The trunk road from Templer Park to Bandar Baru Selayang is now widened to include the second lane. The FT 37 Federal Route 37 (Rawang Bypass), the highest in Southeast Asia, cuts through the jungle and ends in Serendah to the north.

== Education ==
Prior to the opening of the SRJK(Ing) Rawang in 1958, the private school, Clifford Institute, used to be the only English school available for students pursuing an English Education. There are several primary and secondary schools in this town now. Some of the pioneer secondary schools, such as Sekolah Menengah Seri Garing, have a very large student population to the point that classes are even performed in shipping containers. Amateurish ad-hoc renovation and painting have marred the school.

=== Primary schools ===
- Sekolah Rendah Sinaran Budi (formerly SRJK (Inggeris) Rawang. Est 1958
- Sekolah Jenis Kebangsaan (Cina) San Yuk 1
- Sekolah Jenis Kebangsaan (Cina) San Yuk 2 (Branch)
- Sekolah Rendah Agama Sungai Choh
- Sekolah Jenis Kebangsaan (Tamil) Rawang
- Sekolah Kebangsaan Bukit Rawang Jaya
- Sekolah Kebangsaan Bandar Baru Rawang
- Sekolah Kebangsaan Rawang
- Sekolah Kebangsaan Tun Teja
- Sekolah Jenis Kebangsaan (Cina) Kota Emerald
- Sekolah Kebangsaan Taman Desa
- Sekolah Kebangsaan Taman Desa 2
- Sekolah Kebangsaan Bandar Tasik Puteri
- Sekolah Kebangsaan Bandar Tasik Puteri 2
- Sekolah Kebangsaan Seri Kundang
- Sekolah Jenis Kebangsaan (Cina) Kundang
- Sekolah Rendah Agama Assiddiqin, Bandar Tasik Puteri
- KAFA Integrasi Al-Furqan, Bandar Country Homes
- KAFA Integrasi An-Nur, Bandar Country Homes
- Sekolah Rendah Agama Ibnu Khaldun, Batu 16, Rawang
- Sekolah Rendah Agama Al-Hidayah, Taman Tun Teja

=== Secondary schools ===
- Sekolah Menengah Kebangsaan Seri Garing (formerly SMJK (Inggeris), Rawang
- Sekolah Menengah Kebangsaan Rawang Batu 16 (SEMEKAR)
- Sekolah Agama Menengah Rawang (SAMER)
- Sekolah Menengah Kebangsaan Tun Perak (SEMARAK)
- Sekolah Menengah Kebangsaan Taman Desa 1, Bandar Country Homes
- Sekolah Menengah Kebangsaan Taman Desa 2, Bandar Country Homes (STAND 2)
- Sekolah Menengah Kebangsaan Bandar Tasik Puteri (SEMETRI)
- Sekolah Berasrama Penuh Integrasi Rawang, Bandar Tasik Puteri (SEPINTAR)
- Sekolah Menengah Kebangsaan Seri Kundang (SKUSES)

=== International School ===
- Straits International School
- Knewton Global Schools
- Templer Park International School
- Sasana International School

== Neighbourhoods ==
Rawang is home to many housing areas old and new, such as Bandar Country Homes, Taman Anggun, Kota Emerald West, Kota Emerald East, Rawang Putra, Taman Bukit Rawang, Rawang Perdana, Taman Pelangi, Taman Tun Teja, Taman Jati and Taman Bersatu.

The first housing estates in Rawang were Rawang Garden, Green Park, New Green Park, and Rawang Jaya to the north, mostly developed by Lim Tan & Sons. Rawang Tin residents who were affected by the excavation of the limestone open-cast quarry were resettled in Kuala Garing. There were also Taman Garing, Kuala Garing and Taman Sri Rawang to the west; Kampung Datuk Lee Kim Sai, Kampung Sungai Terentang, Kampung Kenanga, and Kampung Melayu Batu 16 to the south.

Emerald (Emerald East and Emerald West), Hong Bee Anggun (Anggun 1, 2, and 3), Lake Club Parkhomes, and M Residences are new to the neighborhoods that have emerged in recent years.

== Development ==
Rawang had experienced rapid development in the 1990s. Many new commercial and residential areas have been constructed. In 2006, a new wet market was opened in Bandar Baru Rawang in order to meet the increasing demand from the population. There are a number of shopping centers in Rawang, including Lotus's, Parkson, and AEON. Despite the growth, the Rawang Police Station was downgraded from a district headquarters to an ordinary station that now has to handle the needs of a larger population.

== Transport ==
=== Public Transport ===
A sideview of the Rawang train station platform

The Rawang train station, which is located in the middle of the old town area, was a major stop for KTM Intercity trains, notably Ekspres Peninsular until 2016. Only the electric-powered KTM ETS trains serve the station now. It is also served by the Tanjung Malim-Port Klang Route, commonly known as the Port Klang Line on the KTM Komuter; before July 2016, passengers were required to alight at this station and change trains to continue their journey to Tanjung Malim. Prior to 2016, it was the terminus of the Seremban Line before the route between Tanjung Malim/Rawang and Batu Caves were switched between the two lines.

A new bus station located in the center of the new town area was completed but out of the main town center located opposite the Rawang Mydin Wholesaler. rapidKL buses provide limited services to Rawang; the major bus operator used to be Metrobus, then taken over by Setara Jaya Sdn Bhd (SJ Bus) in early 2016 under the Bus Network Revamp (BNR) initiative by SPAD until the cessation in 2022.

Currently the major stage bus operator in Rawang is handled by MARA Liner with 4 bus routes in service: 150 (from/to Kuala Lumpur), 154 (from/to Tanjong Malim & Kuala Kubu Bharu), 156 (from/to Taman Bunga Raya, Bukit Beruntung) and BET5 (limited express service between Kuala Lumpur and Bandar Country Homes). RapidKL's MRT feeder bus services also serving southern & further western Rawang areas with two bus routes from MRT Sungai Buloh station: T154 (from/to Kuang & Gamuda Luge Gardens) and T155 (from/to Kota Puteri via Desa Coalfields). Smart Selangor free buses are also available in Rawang with two routes: MPS2 (between Lotus's Rawang to Rawang old town) and MPS3 (between Batu Arang and Sungai Buloh MRT station).

=== Car ===
FT 1 Federal Route 1 is the main thoroughfare going through Rawang town; motorists though prefer the more modern Expressway North–South Expressway Northern Route. Guthrie Corridor Expressway links Rawang to the state capital Shah Alam, while the Kuala Lumpur–Kuala Selangor Expressway is a shortcut to Kuala Selangor.

== Tourism ==
Rawang has become a popular destination for both locals and tourists due to its natural attractions and scenic spots:

- Templer Park – A lush forest reserve with serene waterfalls, hiking trails, and picnic spots, ideal for nature lovers.
- Kanching Rainforest Waterfall – A seven-tiered waterfall that is perfect for trekking and waterfall swimming. It's one of the most scenic spots near Rawang.
- Rawang Bypass – Malaysia's tallest highway, offering scenic views of the surrounding forest while reducing travel time from Rawang to Selayang and Kuala Lumpur.
- Selangor Fruit Valley – A family-friendly agricultural park where visitors can enjoy fruit-picking and learn about local agriculture.
- Tasik Biru Kundang – A man-made lake popular for fishing, kayaking, and paddle boating.

These make Rawang a destination to adventurers, nature lovers, and families alike.

== Culture ==
Rawang is home to several important cultural and religious landmarks:

- Sze Yeah Kong Temple – Established in 1869, this Chinese temple was originally built by the Hakka community and remains a significant religious site in Rawang.
- Sri Veerakathy Vinayagar Temple – Built in 1943, this Hindu temple reflects Rawang's diverse cultural and religious landscape. It is a major place of worship for the local Tamil community.

These temples highlight the multi-cultural and religious diversity of Rawang, making it a historically rich town.
