= Serendah =

Town in Hulu Selangor District, Selangor

- Town in Malaysia

Other transcription(s)
  - Chinese: 双文丹
  - Tamil: செரண்டா
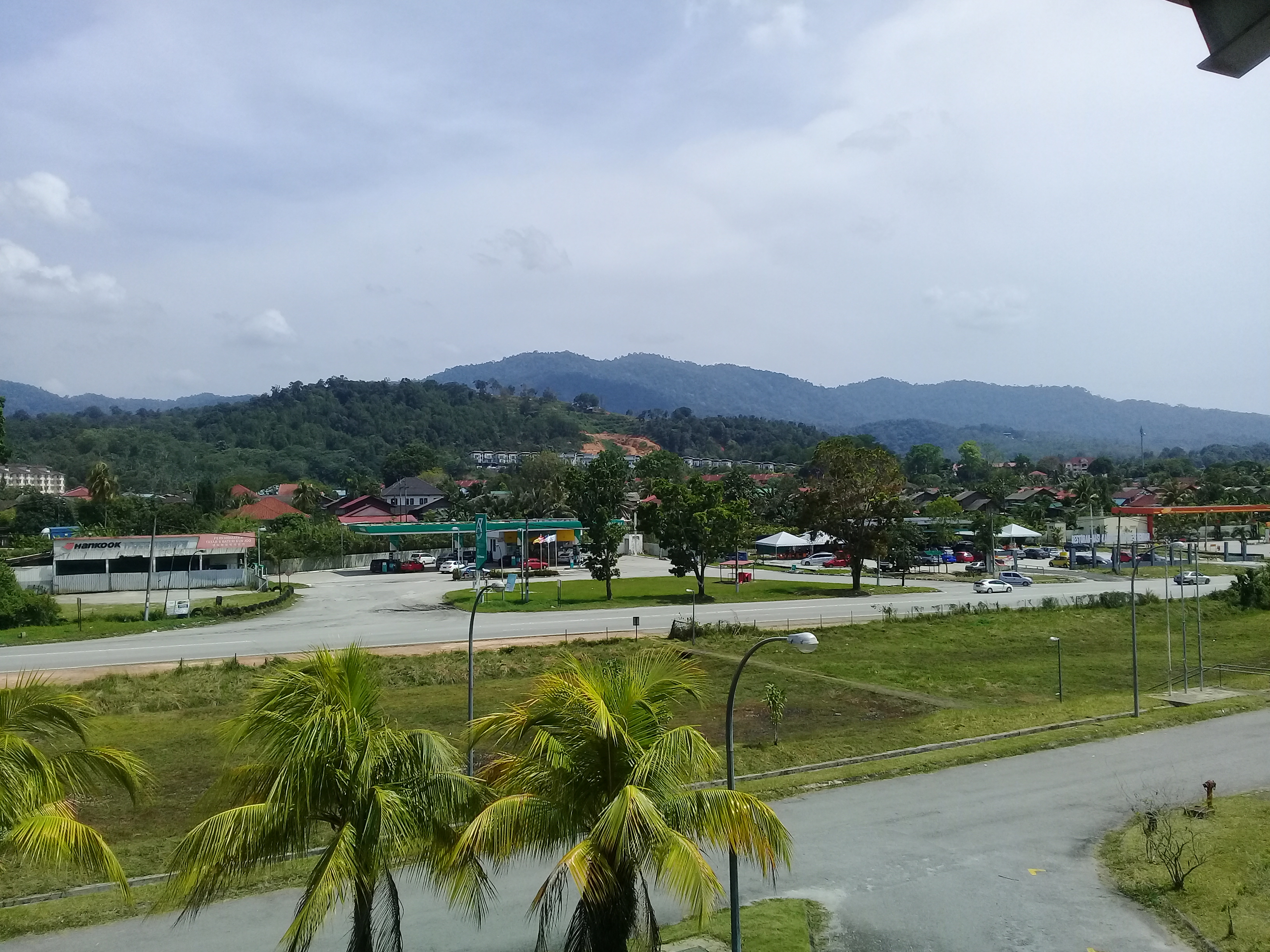
- Serendah

- Serendah location in Selangor, Malay Peninsular and Malaysia Serendah (Peninsular Malaysia) Serendah (Malaysia)
- Coordinates: 3°21′57″N 101°36′15″E
- Country: Malaysia
- State: Selangor
- District: Hulu Selangor
- Elevation: 72 m (236 ft)
- Time zone: UTC+8 (MYT)
- Postal code: 48200

Serendah (Chinese: 双文丹; Tamil: செரண்டா) is a city and mukim in Hulu Selangor District, Selangor, Malaysia. Located 16 miles (26 km) north of Kuala Lumpur, Serendah was originally a home to many tin mines and acted as a satellite town to a bigger mining town, Rawang. The town is now growing at a steady pace. It is among the largest suburb outside the skirt of Kuala Lumpur on top of being the most populated mukim (township) in Hulu Selangor District.

Serendah is growing partly due to the presence of UMW Holdings and existence of Antara Gapi in the area. An industrial city, named UMW High-Value Manufacturing Park is being constructed and will then house a number of manufacturing companies, both national and multinational. An East Coast Rail Link Station planned to open in the same proximity will further accelerate this growth.

In Serendah, some locations' addresses now include the prefix 'Bandar' meaning city. Such as the address for UMW HVM Park and its contents, which displays 'Bandar Serendah' instead of the usual 'Serendah'.

== History ==
The area was developed due to tin mining activities during the British administration.

One of the popular tourist spots in Serendah, Perigi Tujuh Serendah, was built to resist floods. The name Serendah was coined due this area being located at a low level in comparison to its surroundings.

Serendah International Orchid Park was located here.

== Corporations ==
A few established and well-known Malaysian corporations were founded in Serendah. Among them are:

- Perodua
- DRB-HICOM (founded as The New Serendah Rubber Company Limited)

== Geography ==
Serendah in Hulu Selangor District

Encompassing from Sungai Choh in the south, town of Bukit Beruntung in the west, and Antara Gapi in the north, the mukim of Serendah has a total area of -sq mi, -sq mi of which is land and -sq mi, or -% is water.

== Demographics ==
=== Religion ===
There are a number of Chinese temples, one Mosque and a number of surau, one Sikh temple and other religious structure of other regions.

- Hock Leng Keng Temple (双文丹福灵宫), founded in 1869
- Goddess Mazu Temple (妈祖庙)
- Sze Yeah Kong Temple (仙四師爺宮), founded in 1898
- Jing Loong Shan Wan Fo Shih (金龙山万佛寺)
- Liang Liang Temple (娘娘庙)
- Serendah Mosque at Jalan Besar KL-Ipoh
- Sikh Temple - Gurdwara Sahib Serendah
- Vinayagar Temple

== Education ==
There is one secondary school and two primary schools:

- Sekolah Menengah Kebangsaan Serendah
- Sekolah Jenis Kebangsaan (Cina) Serendah
- Sekolah Rendah Kebangsaan Serendah

== Development ==
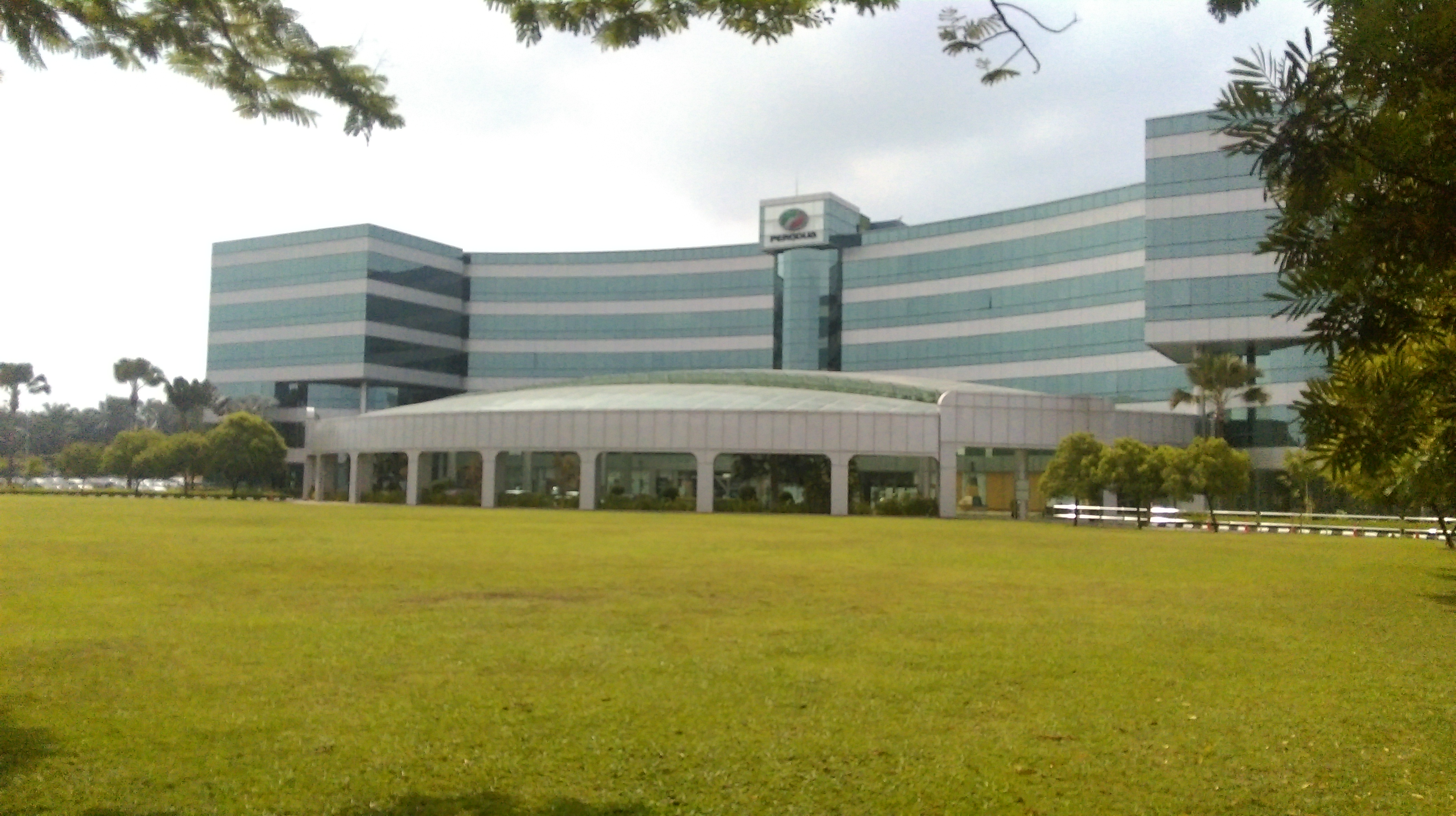
Perodua Corporate Office in Serendah

A new Komuter station, The Serendah Komuter station which is stationed roughly two kilometres northwest from and named after Serendah, opened on April 21, 2007, alongside the Rasa and Batang Kali stations.

Perodua, an national car maker, is headquartered in Serendah.

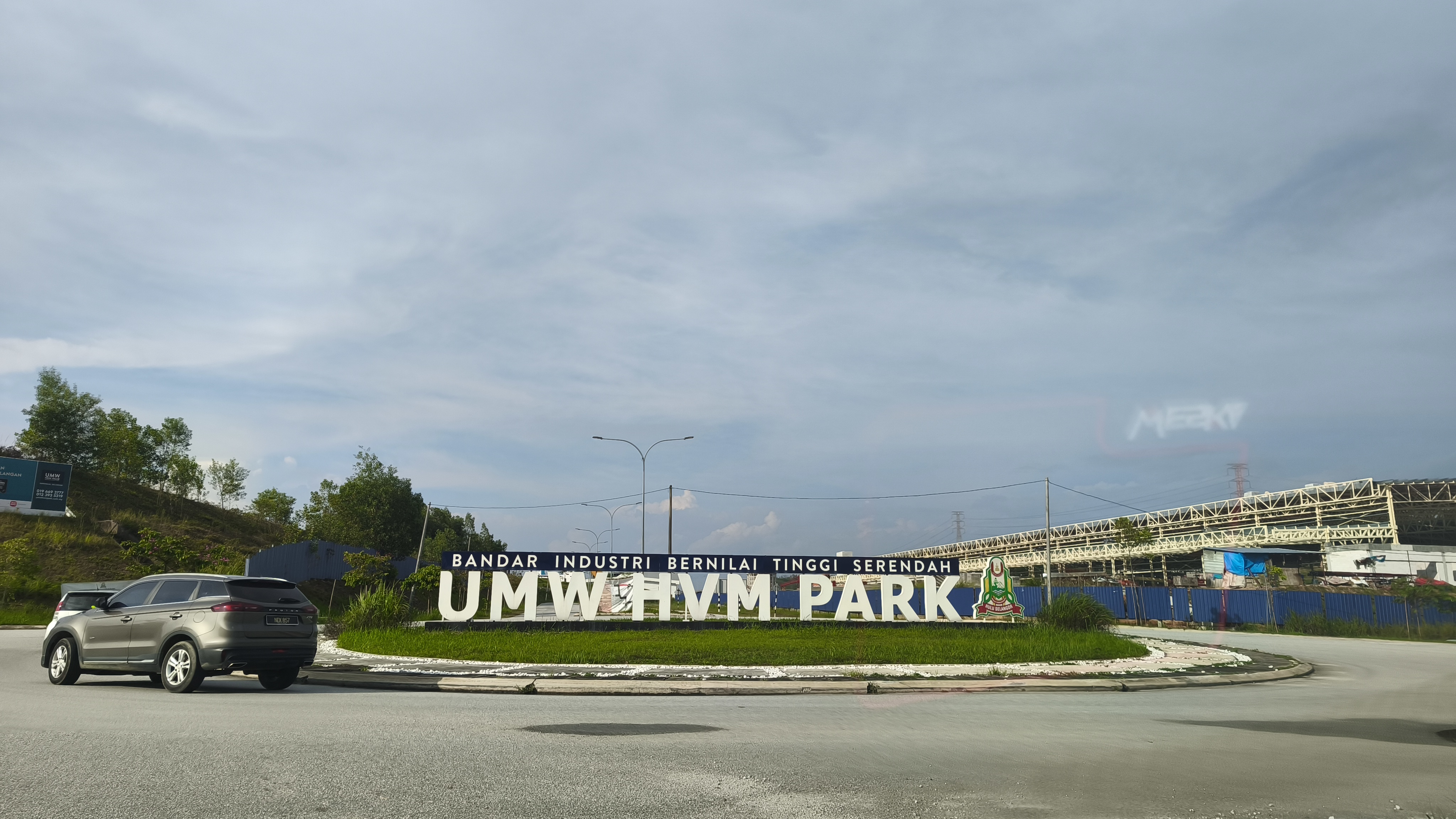
UMW HVM Park in Serendah

UMW Holdings is developing an industrial city in Serendah and has moved many of their subsidiaries' headquarters to the new development. UMW Equipment and UMW Power Solutions moved to the city from Shah Alam in 2023.

Selangor State Development Corporation, a leading developer in the state, has developed a master planned community named Antara Gapi in the more northern portion of Serendah. Antara Gapi is quickly rising as one of the suburbs in the downtown area.

== See also ==
- Serendah Komuter station
