= Kerling, Selangor =

Town in Selangor, Malaysia

Coordinates: 3°35′N 101°36′E

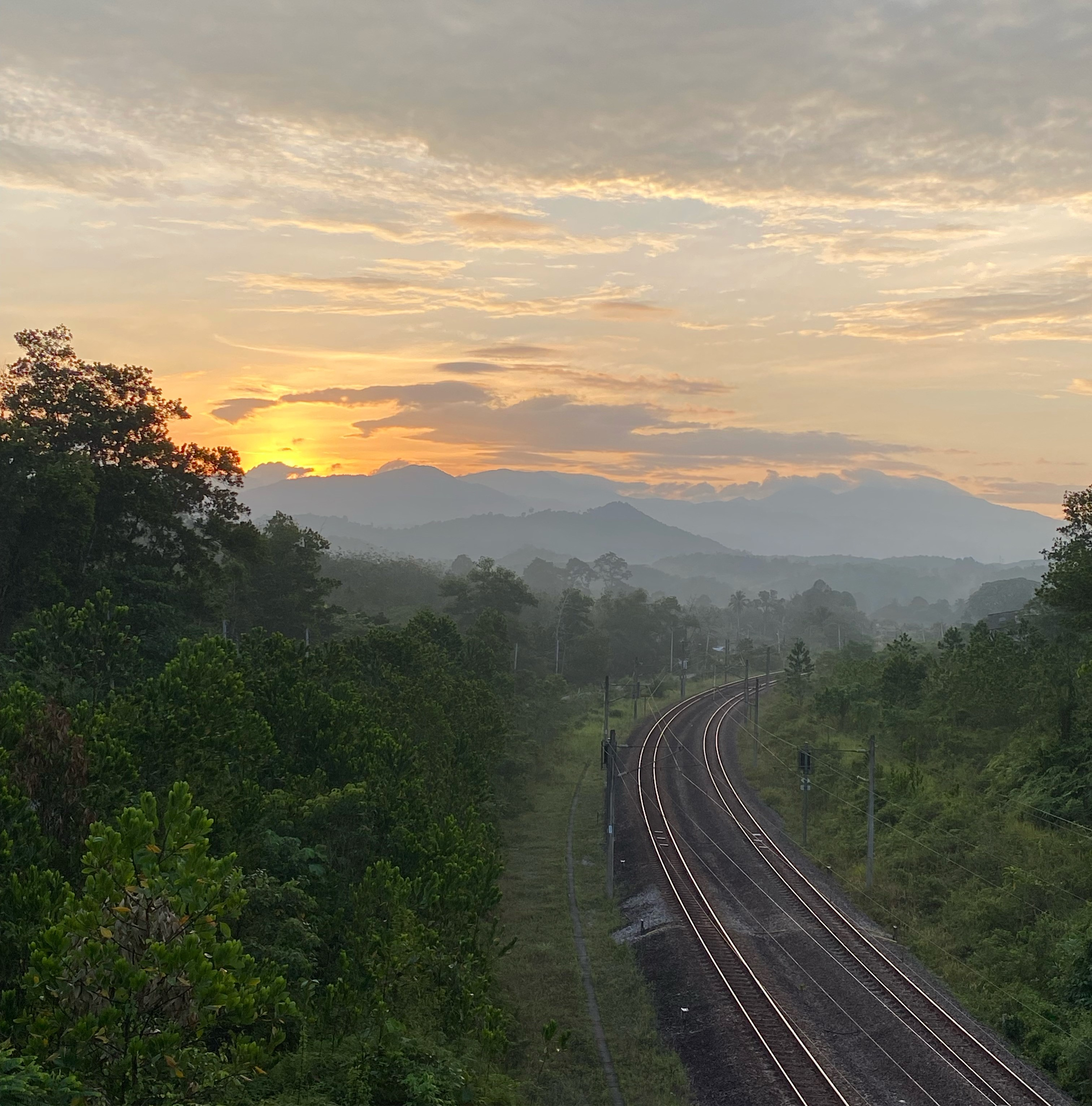
Sunrise at Kerling

Kerling in Hulu Selangor District

Kerling is a mukim (town) in Hulu Selangor District, Selangor, Malaysia. The attraction in this town is Kolam Air Panas (hot spring). The town's name is not related to the similarly sounding racial slur Keling, which is a derogatory slur towards Malaysian Indians .
