= Rasa, Malaysia =

Human settlement in Malaysia

Coordinates: 3°30′N 101°38′E

Rasa

Rasa in Hulu Selangor District

Rasa is a mukim and town in Hulu Selangor District, Selangor, Malaysia. The word rasa means "taste" in Malay.

Since the 1900s Rasa has had a tin mining industry. Tan Boon Chia, a businessman in Selangor, was based in this town and his mansion, the Yuan Chin Hall along the main railway track, still survives. The town is known for its Hakka cuisine. Its the former seat of Hulu Selangor district administration.

Rasa, an extinct isolate language documented in Skeat & Blagden (1906) also once spoken near Rasa in Ulu Selangor, having many words of uncertain origin (Phillips 2012: 257-258).
