= Hulu Selangor Municipal Council =

Local authority in Selangor, Malaysia

Hulu Selangor Municipal Council Majlis Perbandaran Hulu Selangor
- Local Government Act 1976

Type
- Type: Municipal council of Hulu Selangor District

History
- Founded: 1 January 1977

Leadership
- President: Julaihah Jamaludin

Structure
- Political groups: Councillors: PKR (10); DAP (8); Amanah (5); Orang Besar Hulu Selangor (1)

Meeting place
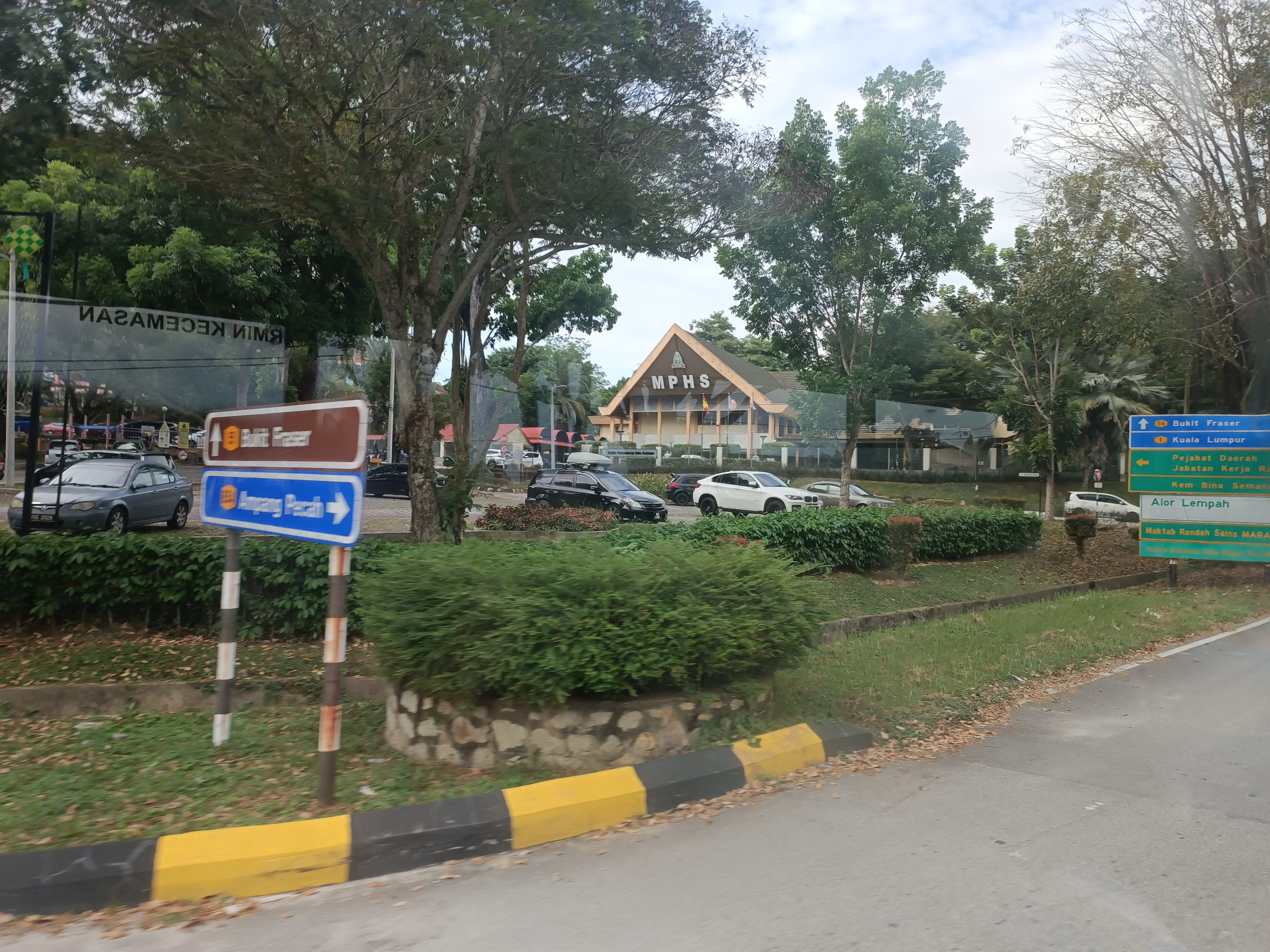
- Jalan Bukit Kerajaan, 44000 Kuala Kubu Bharu, Selangor Darul Ehsan

Website
- www.mphs.gov.my

Hulu Selangor Municipal Council (Malay: Majlis Perbandaran Hulu Selangor) is the local authority which administrates Hulu Selangor District. This agency is under Selangor state government. MPHS is responsible for public health and sanitation, waste removal and management, town planning, environmental protection and building control, social and economic development and general maintenance functions of urban infrastructure.

== History ==
Hulu Selangor District Council was established on 1 January 1977 according to Section 2 Local Government Act 1976 (Act 171) by merger of:

- Asam Kumbang Local Council
- Kalumpang Local Council

The total area under the administration of the council is 174,047 hectares.

On October 21, 2021, Hulu Selangor District Council has been officially promoted to Hulu Selangor Municipal Council.

== Organisation chart ==
=== President ===
For now, the President Of Hulu Selangor Municipal Council (Yang Dipertua) is Hasry Nor Mohd.

=== Departments ===
- Jabatan Perancangan Pembangunan (Planning Development Department)
- Jabatan Khidmat Pengurusan (Management Department)
- Jabatan Kemasyarakatan, Belia dan Sukan (Community, Youth and Sports Department)
- Jabatan Pembangunan dan Penyelengaraan (Development and Maintenance Department)
- Jabatan Kesihatan dan Persekitaran (Health and Environment Department)
- Jabatan Penilaian dan Pengurusan Harta (Valuation Department)
- Jabatan Kawalan Bangunan (Building Control Department)
- Jabatan Perbendaharaan (Treasury Department)
- Unit Audit Dalam (Inner Audit Unit)
- Unit Perundangan (Judicial Unit)

== Councilors ==
2023 Session

Zone No.	Member	Party
PKR 10 | DAP 7 | AMANAH 5 | Orang Besar Hulu Selangor 1
1	Saifulanuar bin Darmo	PKR
2	Husna Mohd Amran	AMANAH
3	Rohani Yusof	AMANAH
4	A.Durai Anbalagan Ayya Kanama	AMANAH
5	Abdul Mun'im Roslin	AMANAH
6	Law Suet Peng	DAP
7	Thilageswary Muniandi	PKR
8	Saripah Bakar	DAP
9	Syed Hidayat Syed Hassan	DAP
10	Yong Chan Hee	DAP
11	Kalai Wani Muthusamy	DAP
12	Tan Lai Zhen	DAP
13	Chinniah Subramaniam	DAP
14	Wong Sheau Mei @ Ong Sheau Mei	PKR
15	Md Johari Halus	AMANAH
16	Aylwin Chan Wai Tuck	PKR
17	Muhamad Syafiq Zazali	PKR
18	Fuad Ahmad Naravi	PKR
19	Nur Jahirah binti Johari	PKR
20	Murugan a/l Veerapandian	PKR
21	Hayati binti Chat	PKR
22	Puvanesvaran Patchimuthu	PKR
23	Kalaichelvan Jaganathan	PKR
24	Raja Muzaffar Raja Redzwa	Orang Besar Hulu Selangor

== Official flower and tree ==
Sunflower is the symbol of the Hulu Selangor Municipal Council, as the council is cheerful and prepared to serve every customer with efficiency and satisfaction.

The Mahogany tree is the official tree for Hulu Selangor and the main tree being planted at Kuala Kubu Bharu.

== Administration Area ==
Below are the administration area for MPHS which further breakdown into 23 zones.

ZONE 1

- Kampung Alah Batu
- Kampung Sri Kledang
- Kampung Orang Asli Changkat Bintang
- Kampung Sungai Pagi
- Kampung Sungai Nilam
- Kampung Selisek
- Kampung Lalang
- Kampung Masjid
- Kampung Sekolah
- Kampung Gesir Hulu
- Kampung Serigala

ZONE 2

- Felda Gedangsa
- Felda Sungai Dusun
- Felda Soeharto

ZONE 3

- Felda Sungai Tengi (Utara)
- Felda Sungai Tengi (Selatan)

ZONE 4

- Pekan Hulu Bernam
- Bandar Bernam Jaya
- Changkat Asa

ZONE 5

- Pekan Kalumpang
- Taman Bahtera
- Kampung Benggali
- Taman Musabika
- Kampung Gumut Tambahan
- Kampung Titiwangsa
- Desa Merpati
- Taman Rajawali

ZONE 6

- Pekan Kerling
- Lembah Damai
- Kampung Pasir
- Kampung Jawa
- Kuala Kerling
- Kampung Baru Cina Kerling

ZONE 7

- Bandar Lembah Beringin

ZONE 8

- Kuala Kubu Bharu (Utara)
- Kampung Paya Dalam
- Taman Teratai
- Taman Arif
- Taman Tinggian KKB (KKB Heights)
- Rumah Murah Padang Golf
- Kampung Asam Kumbang
- Taman Pesara
- Taman Juta
- Taman Seruling

ZONE 9

- Kuala Kubu Bharu (Selatan)
- Kampung Kelapa
- Ampang Pecah
- Taman Damai Utama
- Desa Bukit Bujang
- Kampung Orang Asli Buloh Telur
- Taman Tanjak
- Kampung Sungai Damar

ZONE 10

- Bandar Rasa
- Kawasan Perindustrian Zurah
- Kampung Rasa Tambahan
- Taman Keruing
- Desa Rening
- Kampung Chuang
- Kampung Kandayah
- Taman Rasa Utama
- Darul Atiq
- Taman Cemperai

ZONE 11

- Seksyen 2 & 4 Bandar Utama Batang Kali
- Desa Alam Ria
- Kampung Kuantan
- Kampung Hulu Rening
- Kampung Sungai Tamu
- Taman Akasia

ZONE 12

- Seksyen 3 & 5 Bandar Utama Batang Kali
- Pusat Perniagaan Kelah
- Kampung Kalong Tengah
- Desa Patin
- Kampung Padang
- Taman Seri

ZONE 13

- Bandar Baru Batang Kali
- Kawasan Perindustrian Miel
- Kampung Bukit Chandang
- Kampung Sentosa
- Kampung Sentosa Tambahan
- Kampung Meyuruk
- Taman Seri Cahaya
- Pekan Hulu Yam Lama
- Kampung Dusun Haromanis

ZONE 14

- Pekan Hulu Yam Bharu
- Kampung Talu
- Kampung Sungai Kamin
- Taman Desa Kaloi
- Taman Desa Kelisa
- Kampung Hulu Kalong
- Kampung Orang Asli Songkok
- Legend Farmsted
- Kampung Pasir
- Kawasan Perindustrian Perabot
- Hulu Yam Perdana

ZONE 15

- Kawasan Perindustrian Batu 30
- Taman Emas
- Kampung Batu 30
- Bandar Antara Gapi
- Taman Tasik Teratai

ZONE 16

- Bandar Serendah
- Taman Pinggiran Tasik Kiambang
- Kampung Seri Serendah
- Taman Cempaka
- Kampung Dato Harun
- Desa Anggerik
- Taman Seri Serendah
- Desa Melor
- Kampung Damai
- Taman Melati
- Taman Desa Kiambang
- Serendah Golf
- Kampung Orang Asli Serendah
- Taman Melati

ZONE 17

- Simpang Sungai Choh
- Taman Serendah Indah
- Kampung Tradisi Sungai Choh
- Kampung Stesen
- Taman Daya Permata
- Kampung Mohd Taib
- Kawasan Perindustrian Sungai Choh
- Kampung Koskan
- Taman Kosaso
- Taman Ehsan Ibu
- Kawasan Perindustrian Anugerah Suria
- Taman Bukit Teratai

ZONE 18

- Jalan Widuri
- Jalan Kesumba
- Jalan Kemboja
- Jalan Bakawali
- Jalan Telipot
- Jalan Anggerik 4

ZONE 19

- Jalan Seroja
- Jalan Anggerik 5, 6 & 7
- Jalan Bunga Azalea
- Perodua
- Jalan Daisi
- Jalan Cempaka
- Jalan Teluki
- Jalan Orkid (Town Centre)
- Jalan Tanjung
- Jalan Bunga Raya
- Jalan Seri Pagi
- Pusat Latihan Polis

ZONE 20

- Jalan Adenium
- Jalan Jasmine
- Jalan Kenanga
- Jalan Jenjarum
- Jalan Kamunting
- Jalan Tanjung
- Jalan Semarak
- Jalan Kantan
- Jalan Kasturi
- Jalan Melati
- Jalan Dahlia

ZONE 21

- Kelab Golf Bukit Beruntung
- Taman Bunga Raya
- Jalan Anggerik
- Jalan Melor
- Jalan Kekwa
- Jalan Camelia
- Prima Beruntung
- Desa Beruntung

ZONE 22

- Bandar Sungai Buaya
- Kampung Sungai Buaya
- Kampung Orang Asli Sungai Kelubi

ZONE 23

- Kawasan Bukit Tagar
