= Sungai Choh =

Town in Gombak and Hulu Selangor, Malaysia

Coordinates: 3°21′N 101°34′E

- Interactive map of Sungai Choh
- Country: Malaysia
- State: Selangor
- District: Gombak and Hulu Selangor

Sungai Choh (Malay: سوڠاي چوه, romanized: Sungai Choh) is a small town situated within the boundary of both Gombak District and Hulu Selangor District, Selangor. The town is inhabited by a community of Bengkulu Malays who migrated in the late 19th century from the west coast of Sumatra.

== History ==
Sungai Choh has existed since the late 19th century. Early settlers from Sumatra (more specifically, the Bengkulu Malays community from the province of Bengkulu, Indonesia) are the first to settle down at Sungai Choh. Today, most of the people in Sungai Choh have lineages originating from Bengkulu.

No one really knows how Sungai Choh got its name. According to some, the name comes from a river at Sungai Choh, called "Sungai Chul". As time went by, the name of the Sungai Chul was then called the Sungai Choh according to the Bengkulu Malay dialect at that time. Sungai Choh is also called as Sungai Choh Simpang (lit. 'Choh River Junction') in old maps. This is likely because of the three-way junction that leads to either the main road (to Ipoh or Kuala Lumpur), or to Sungai Buaya, a neighboring town.

== Culture ==
Sungai Choh is famous for its traditional Bengkulu tarts. The people of Sungai Choh still practice Bengkulu Malay customs and culture, as seen at weddings and celebrations.

One of the residential areas located here is the Kampung Tradisi Sungai Choh (lit. 'Sungai Choh Traditional Village'), which is the original village since the arrival of the Bengkulu Malay people.

== Industry ==
A factory area, Sungai Choh Auto City, was developed by Bina Harta Group and completed in 2017.

== Education ==
There is one secondary school and 3 primary schools:

1. Sekolah Menengah Kebangsaan Sungai Choh Rawang
2. Sekolah Rendah Kebangsaan Sungai Choh
3. Sekolah Rendah Agama Sungai Choh
4. Sekolah Jenis Kebangsaan Tamil Ladang Sungai Choh
