= Sungai Buaya =

Coordinates: 3.3745734°N 101.5293861°E

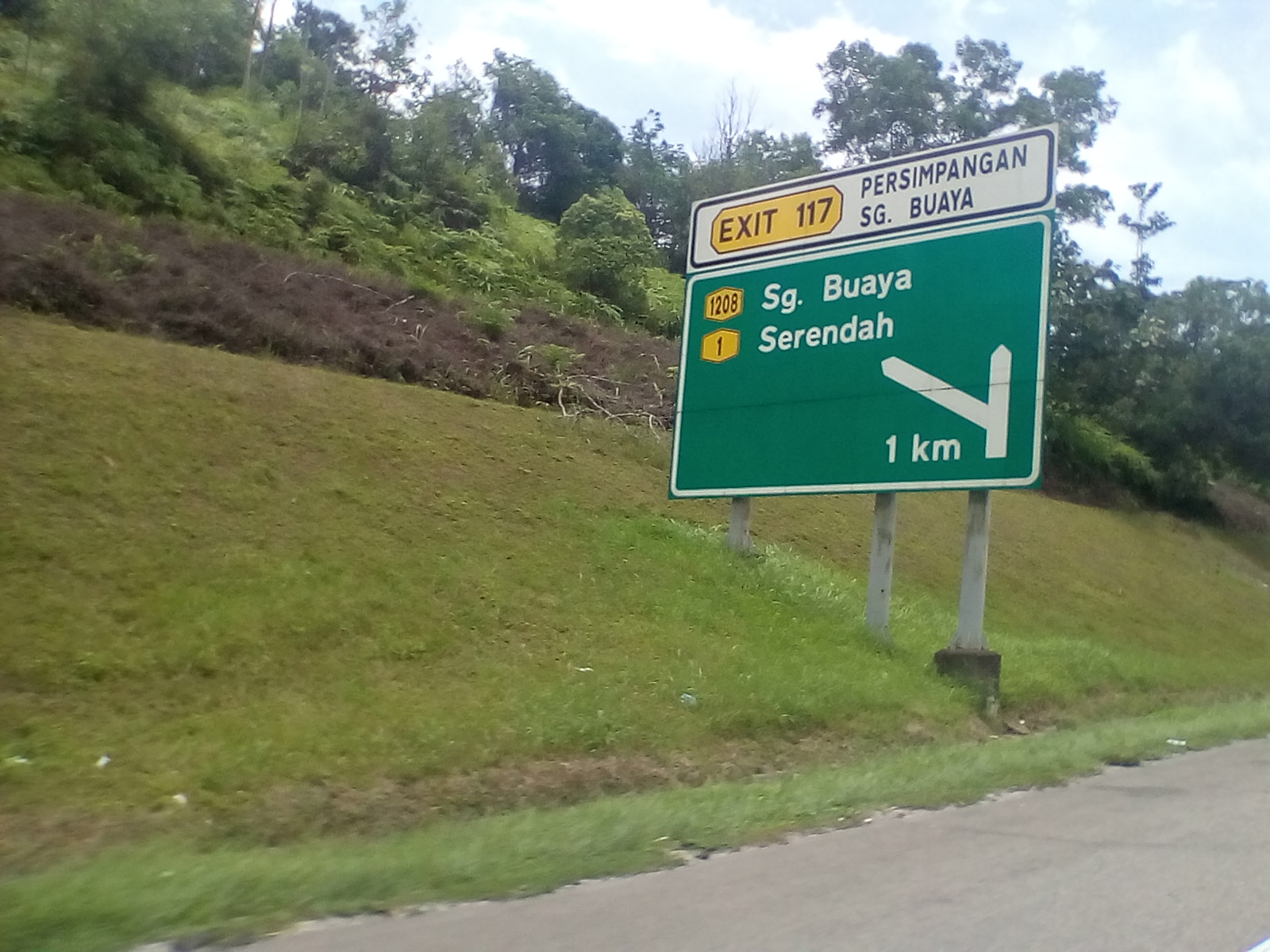
- Sungai Buaya Interchange
- Interactive map of Sungai Buaya
- Country: Malaysia
- State: Selangor
- District: Hulu Selangor

Sungai Buaya is a small town in Hulu Selangor District, Selangor, Malaysia.

== Transportation ==
=== Car ===
North–South Expressway Northern Route, 117 serves Sungai Buaya.
