= Hulu Selangor District =

Administrative district in Selangor, Malaysia

- District of Selangor
- Daerah Hulu Selangor
- Seal
- Interactive map of Hulu Selangor District
- Location of Hulu Selangor District in Malaysia Hulu Selangor District (Peninsular Malaysia)
- Coordinates: 3°35′N 101°35′E
- Country: Malaysia
- State: Selangor
- Granted Municipal Status: 21 October 2021
- Seat: Kuala Kubu Bharu
- Local area government(s): Hulu Selangor Municipal Council

Area
  - Total: 1,756.30 km^{2} (678.11 sq mi)

Population (2020)
  - Total: 239,978
  - Density: 136.638/km^{2} (353.892/sq mi)
- Time zone: UTC+8 (MST)
  - Summer (DST): UTC+8 (Not observed)
- Postcode: 44xxx, 482xx
- Calling code: +6-03
- Vehicle registration plates: B

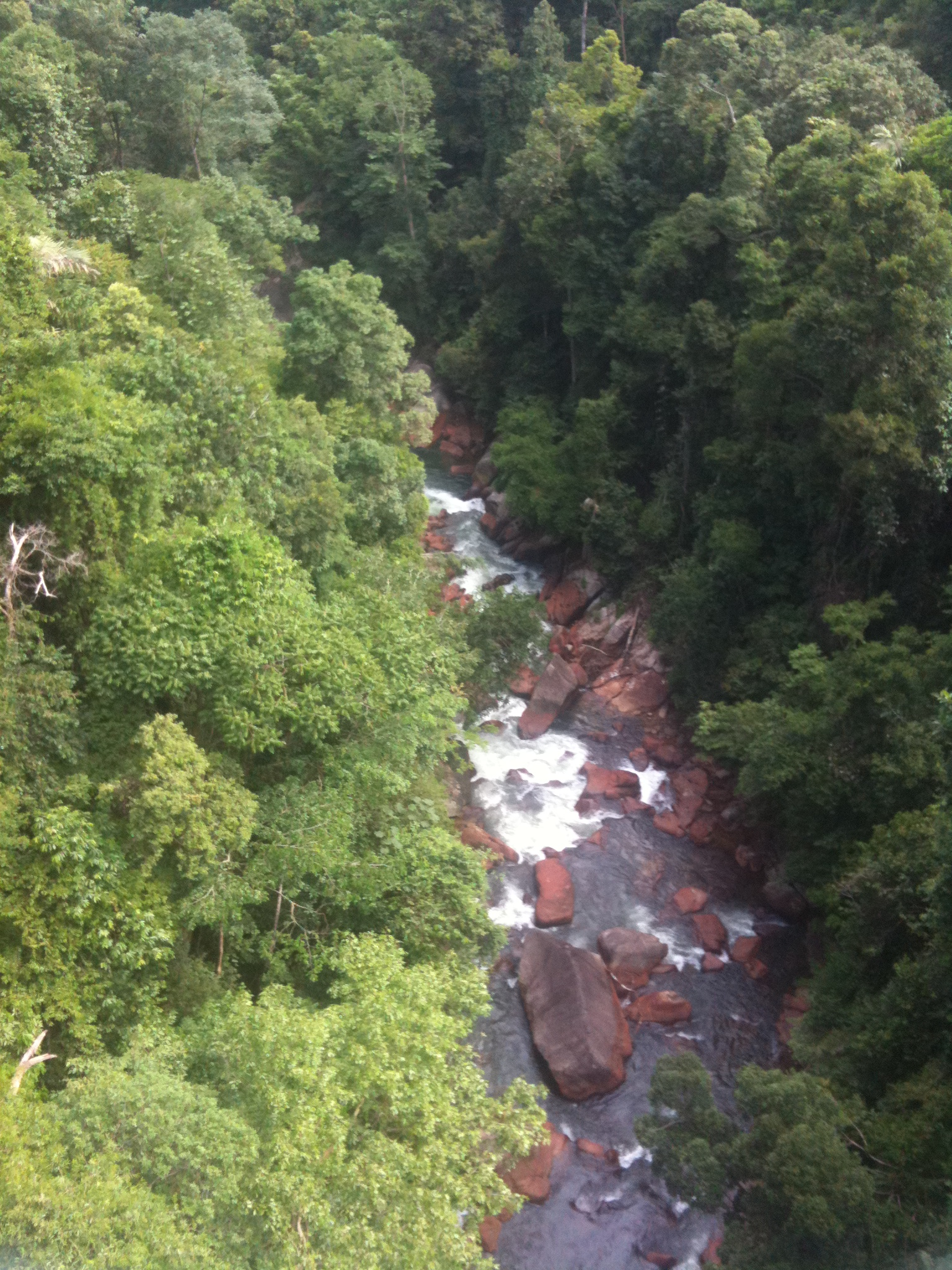
Selangor River, Hulu Selangor

Hulu Selangor is a district in Selangor, Malaysia. It contains the towns of Serendah, Batang Kali and Kuala Kubu Bharu. Its principal town is Kuala Kubu Bharu. The district is located in the northeastern part of Selangor and borders the state of Perak to the north, Pahang to the east, Sabak Bernam district to the northwest, Kuala Selangor district to its southwest and Gombak district to the south. Selangor River sources from this area, hence giving the district's name. Originally, Gombak district which includes Rawang was a part of this district, but separated on 1 February 1974 during Selangor district restructuring as Kuala Lumpur succeeded from Selangor.

== Geography ==
Hulu Selangor occupies the north eastern area of Selangor and is bordered by Kuala Selangor district to the west, Perak to the north, Pahang (Bentong district) to the east and Gombak district to the south. The district has a lot of forests and beautiful natural scenery, making it a touristic place. Nearly half of the district is filled with hilly, mountainous terrains and forest reserves. The Titiwangsa runs through the east of this district, which draws the border between Selangor and Pahang along the peaks.

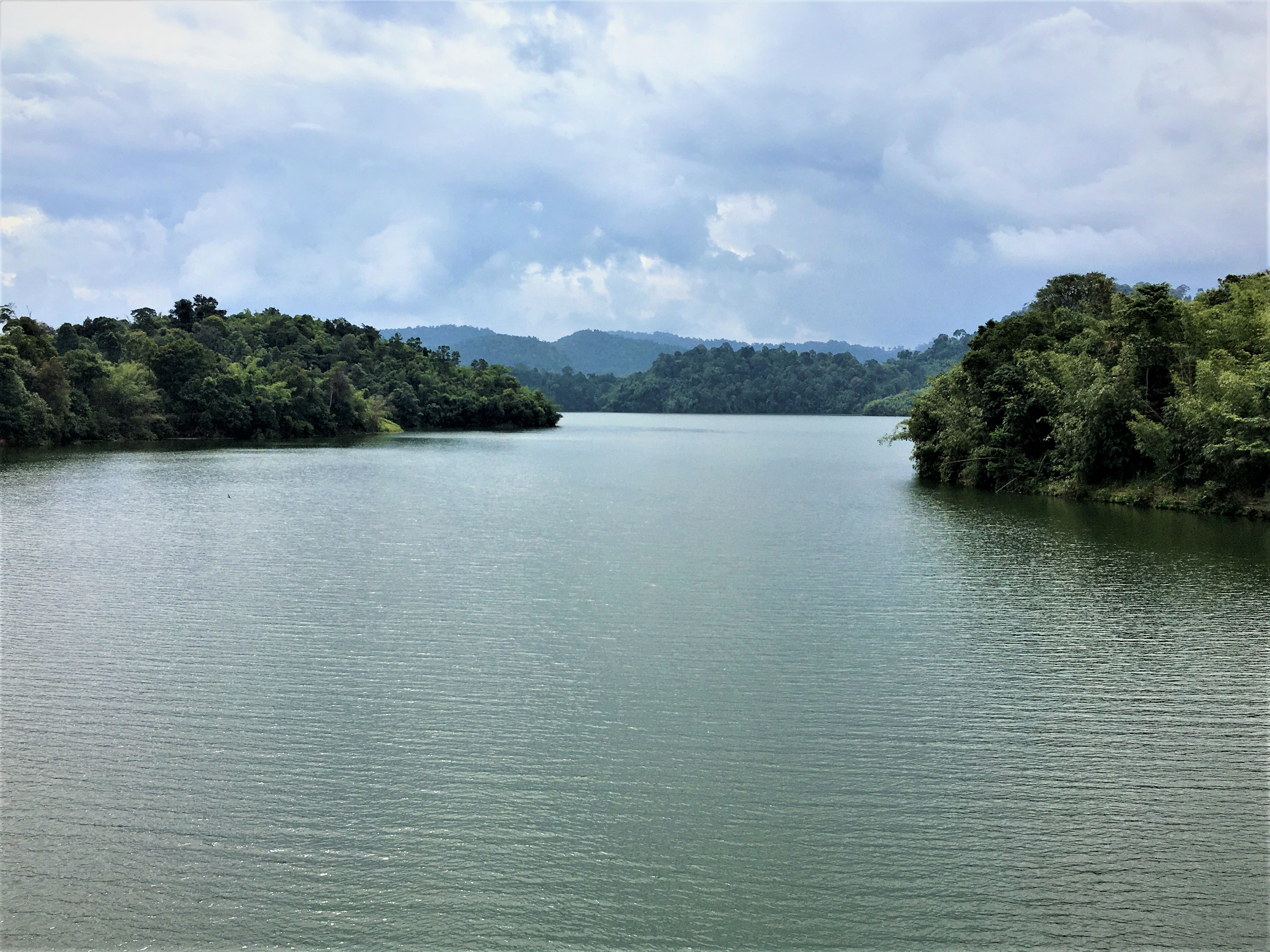
Sungai Selangor Dam Reservoir, Peretak

== History ==
The district of Hulu Selangor has existed since the Federated Malay States era, although at that time the name of the district was spelled Ulu Selangor. Hulu Selangor was supposed to be administered by multiple administrative councils, but was united into a single Hulu Selangor Municipal Council by the Selangor State Assembly on January 1, 1977, under Section 2 Local Government Act 1976 (Act 171). Hulu Selangor Municipal Council now has the largest jurisdiction among other local governments in Selangor.

Prior to 1974, before the creation of Gombak District, Hulu Selangor District contained the cities of Rawang, Kuang and Batu Arang. However, after restructuring works which includes the declaration of Kuala Lumpur as a federal territory, Rawang is incorporated into the newly formed district of Gombak leaving its satellite town Serendah with the suburbs of Bukit Beruntung and Sungai Buaya to remain in Hulu Selangor District.

== Economy ==
Hulu Selangor is thriving in the industrial sector, particularly manufacturing, and seemingly is broadening into different parts of the sector. Type of industries that operates in the district are automotive, supplies manufacturing and aerospace. The local and state government are also anticipating more industries and investors to move into the district. Both the local and state governments are advocating Hulu Selangor to be the hub of sustainable manufacturing and clean industries. Private sectors and the government is also working together to further enhance the industries in the area.

A new High-Value Manufacturing Park, a UMW Holdings project, has been under construction in Serendah which is targeted to attract international investors.

A newly proposed Serendah-Port Klang rail line which will bypass KL Central Station and directly connect Serendah to Port Klang, the largest international trading port in Malaysia located along the Strait of Malacca, reducing length and time between the two points, will also accelerate the development in Serendah especially among the industrial and manufacturing sector. The proposed rail line is highly anticipated by the state and federal government and is close to realization.

Other than the industrial sector, the district is also expanding in tourism as one of the main drivers of the local economy. The mountainous area of the district makes it an appealing touristic area. Many from the private sectors have increasingly been opening up new recreational parks across Hulu Selangor. The district is known as a short getaway to nature due to its close proximity to Kuala Lumpur. Other than that, Genting Highlands, famous for its theme parks and by being situated on top of a mountain, is also in close proximity to Hulu Selangor. Located at the peak of Mount Ulu Kali just on the border of Selangor and Pahang, Genting Highlands is one of the attractions of the area. Thus, the town of Batang Kali is designated to be a transit city to Genting Highlands. At the time being, most of Genting Highlands are located in the state of Pahang, the Selangor's side of the border remained mostly undeveloped. This however opens the way for the local and state government to do thoughtful planning for upcoming attractive tourist attractions up there.

== Government and representatives ==
=== Government ===
Hulu Selangor is administered by Hulu Selangor Municipal Council, the local government.

=== Elected Officials ===
Hulu Selangor is represented by two MPs in the Dewan Rakyat of Parliament of Malaysia from two different federal constituencies, the Hulu Selangor constituency and Tanjong Karang constituency.

List of representatives representing the Hulu Selangor district in the House of Representatives. (Dewan Rakyat) (Note: Mukim Sungai Tinggi's Sungai Tinggi area is located in Tanjong Karang and Permatang respectively.)

Parliament	Seat Name	Member of Parliament	Party
P94	Hulu Selangor	Hasnizan Harun	Perikatan Nasional (PAS)
P95	Tanjong Karang	Zulkafperi Hanapi	Perikatan Nasional (PPBM)

List of representatives representing the Hulu Selangor district in the State Legislative Assembly of Selangor

Parliament	State	Seat Name	State Assemblyman	Party
P94	N5	Hulu Bernam	Mu'izuddin Mahyuddin	Perikatan Nasional (PAS)
P94	N6	Kuala Kubu Baharu	Pang Sock Tao	Pakatan Harapan (DAP)
P94	N7	Batang Kali	Muhammad Muhaimin Harith Abdullah Sani	Perikatan Nasional (BERSATU)
P95	N9	Permatang	Nurul Syazwani Noh	Perikatan Nasional (BERSATU)

== Demographics ==
Historical population
Year	Pop.	±%
1991	82,814	—
2000	147,996	+78.7%
2010	194,387	+31.3%
2020	243,029	+25.0%

The following is based on Department of Statistics Malaysia 2010 census.

Ethnic groups in Hulu Selangor, 2010 census
Ethnicity	Population	Percentage
Bumiputera	133,080	70.1%
Chinese	23,498	12.4%
Indian	32,459	17.1%
Others	9,698	0.4%
Total	189,836	100%

== Subdivisions ==

Hulu Selangor District is divided into 13 mukims, which are:

Mukim	Area (km^{2})
Ampang Pecah (including Kuala Kubu Bharu town)	41
Batang Kali	163
Buloh Telur	26
Hulu Bernam	446
Hulu Yam	111
Kalumpang	41
Kerling	175
Kuala Kalumpang	39
Peretak	204
Rasa	83
Serendah	129
Sungai Gumut	41
Sungai Tinggi	160

== See also ==
- Districts of Malaysia
