= KLIA T1 ERL station =

Railway station

Coordinates: 2.7550°N 101.7049°E

KE2 KT5 KLIA T1
- The platform towards KL Sentral of the KLIA T1 ERL station.

General information
- Other names: Malay: Terminal 1 Lapangan Terbang Antarabangsa Kuala Lumpur; Chinese: 吉隆坡国际机场第一航站楼; Tamil: கோலாலம்பூர் பன்னாட்டு வானூர்தி நிலையம் T1
- Location: Kuala Lumpur International Airport, Sepang, Selangor, Malaysia.
- System: | Airport rail link station
- Owner: Express Rail Link
- Lines: 6 KLIA Ekspres; 7 KLIA Transit
- Platforms: 1 island platform
- Tracks: 2

History
- Opened: 2002
- Former names: KLIA

Services
Preceding station	Express Rail Link	Following station
Salak Tinggi towards Kuala Lumpur Sentral	KLIA Transit	KLIA T2 Terminus
Kuala Lumpur Sentral Terminus	KLIA Ekspres	KLIA T2 Terminus
Location

The KLIA T1 ERL station (formerly known as KLIA) is a station on the Express Rail Link (ERL) which serves the Terminal 1 building of Kuala Lumpur International Airport (KLIA) in Sepang, Selangor, Malaysia. The station is located on the first floor of the building. It is served by both lines of the ERL, the KLIA Ekspres and KLIA Transit.

All ERL trains stop at this station and the KLIA T2 ERL station. The KLIA Ekspres runs non-stop to KL Sentral, the main railway in the capital Kuala Lumpur, while the KLIA Transit makes additional stops at three intermediate stations before terminating at KL Sentral.

== KLIA T1-KLIA T2 shuttle ==
The KLIA Ekspres and KLIA Transit services each operate on two 2 km bi-directional single tracks between the Terminal 1 and Terminal 2 stations. The KLIA Ekspres runs on the track connecting Platforms A of both stations and the KLIA Transit between Platforms B respectively. Passengers are advised whether a service is inbound or outbound through automated station announcements and platform displays.

These overlapping services and shared stations allow the ERL to function as a higher frequency shuttle between Terminal 1 and Terminal 2 unlike the termini at KL Sentral where the services end and start at their separate platforms on different corners of the station.

== See also ==
- Kuala Lumpur International Airport
- Public transport in Kuala Lumpur
