= CRRC Changchun Railway Vehicles =

Chinese rolling stock manufacturer

CRRC Changchun Railway Vehicles Co., Ltd.
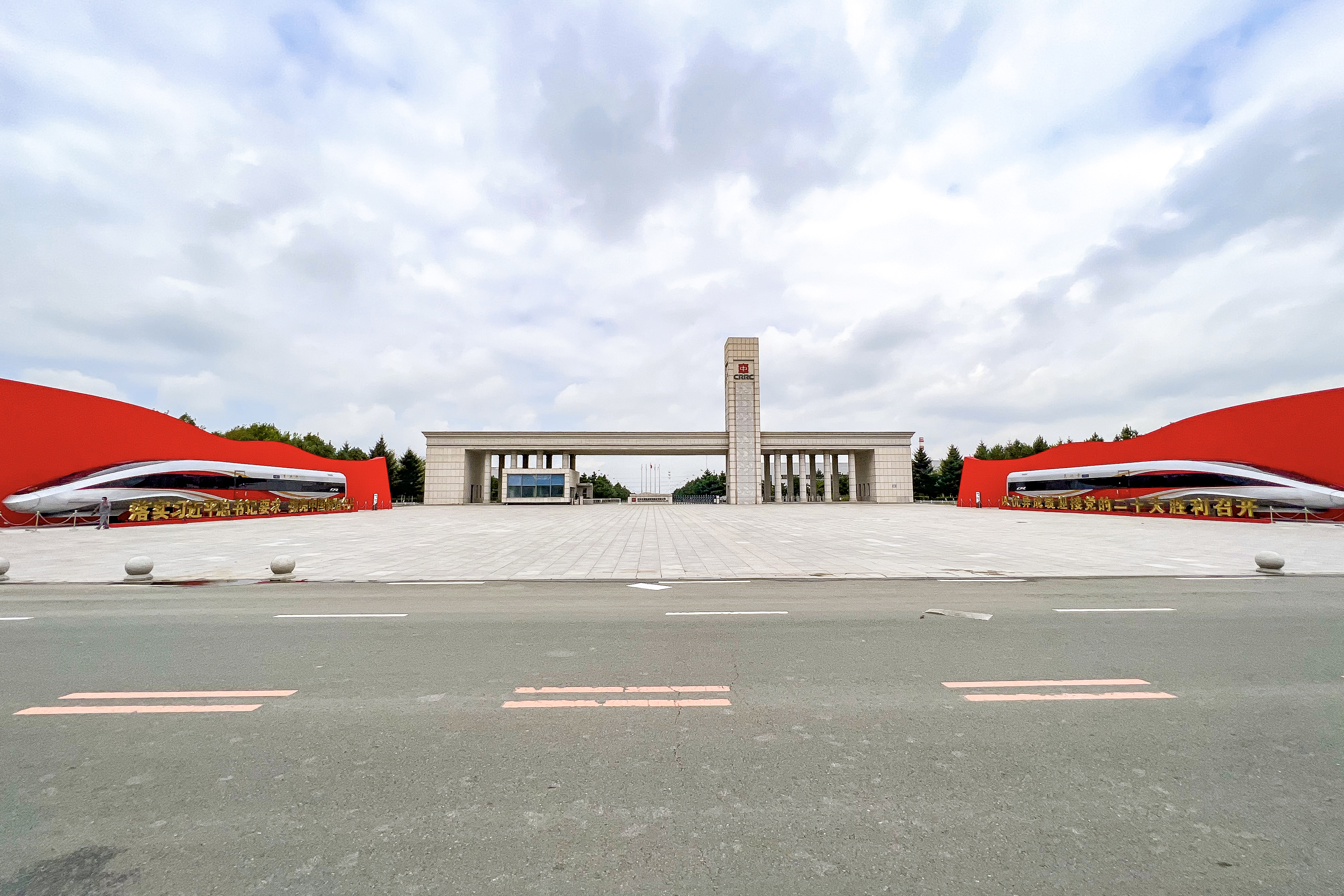
- Headquarters
- Native name: 中车长春轨道客车股份有限公司
- Formerly: CNR Changchun Railway Vehicles Co., Ltd. (1954–2015)
- Type: State-owned Company
- Industry: Rail transport
- Founded: 1954; 72 years ago
- Headquarters: Changchun, Jilin, China
- Number of locations: Hefei, Wuhan, Chongqing, Xi'an, Nanchang, Huhhot, Shanghai, Jinhua
- Products: Locomotives, passenger cars, multiple units, rapid transits
- Parent: China CNR (1954–2015); CRRC (2015–)
- Website: www.crrcgc.cc/ckgfen

CRRC Changchun Railway Vehicles Co., Ltd. (Chinese: 中车长春轨道客车股份有限公司) is a Chinese rolling stock manufacturer and a division of the CRRC. While the CRV emerged in 2002, the company's roots date back to the establishment of the Changchun Passenger Car Factory in 1954. The company became a division of CNR Corporation before its merger with CSR to form the present CRRC. It has produced a variety of rolling stock for customers in China and abroad, including locomotives, passenger cars, multiple units, rapid transit and light rail vehicles. It has established technology transfer partnerships with several foreign railcar manufacturers, including Bombardier Transportation, Alstom, and Siemens Mobility.

== Joint ventures ==
In 2004 Alstom won the first high speed train contract in China, supporting CRRC to build 60 CRH5 high speed trains.

In November 2016, CRRC won the contract to build the High Capacity Metro Train for the Melbourne suburban train network, as part of Evolution Rail, a public–private partnership including the Downer Group and the Plenary Group.

=== Changchun Alstom Railway Vehicles Co., Ltd. (Alstom & Changchun Railway Vehicles) ===
In 1996, CRRC and Adtranz (later Bombardier Transportation then Alstom) established a joint venture. Since 2000, CARC has built cars for domestic use in Shanghai Metro, Guangzhou Metro, Shenzhen Metro and since 2015 exported trains for Singapore's Mass Rapid Transit (MRT).

== Clients and products ==
Note: the information below is based on CNR Changchun Simplified Chinese website.

=== Domestic ===
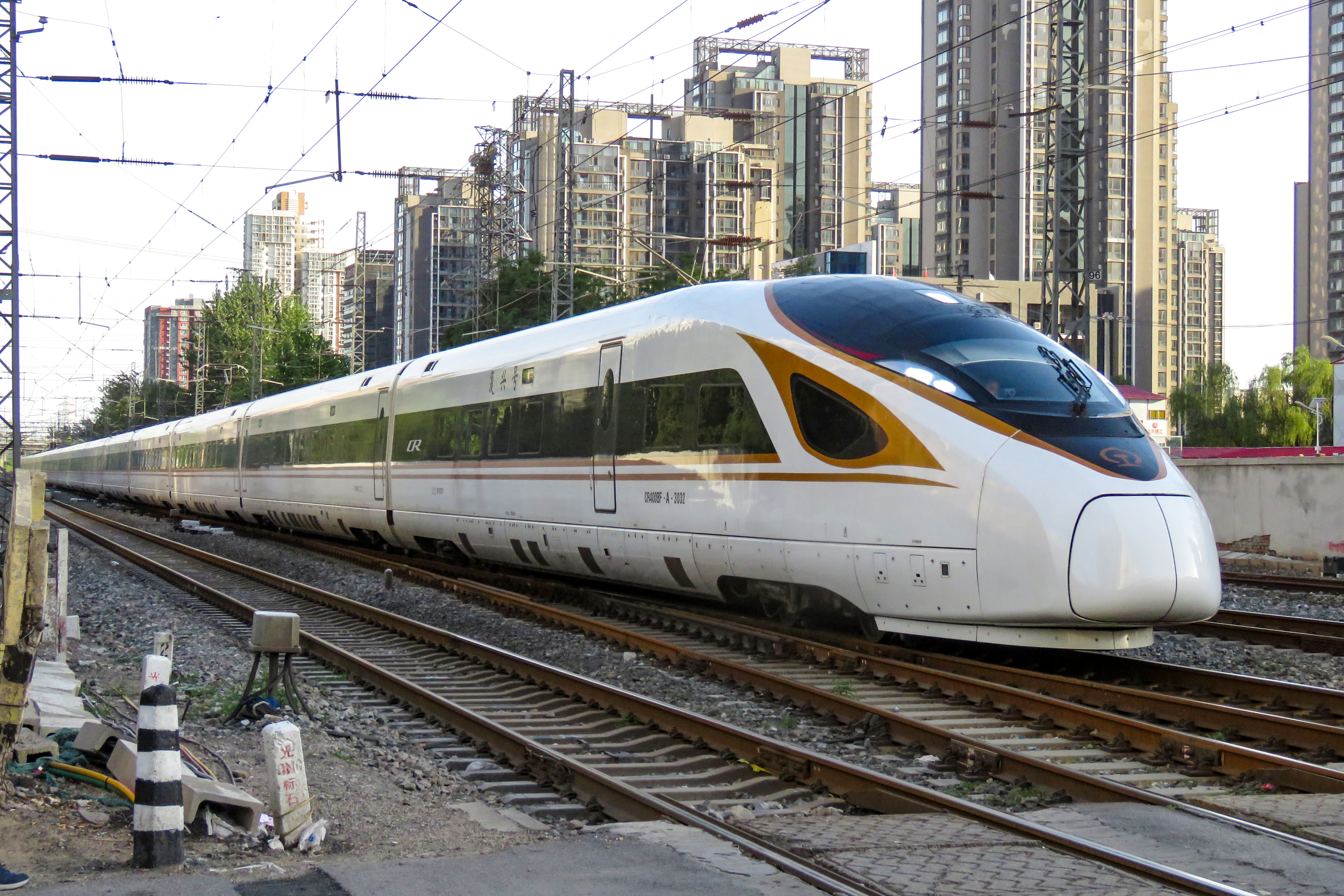
CR400BF high speed EMU

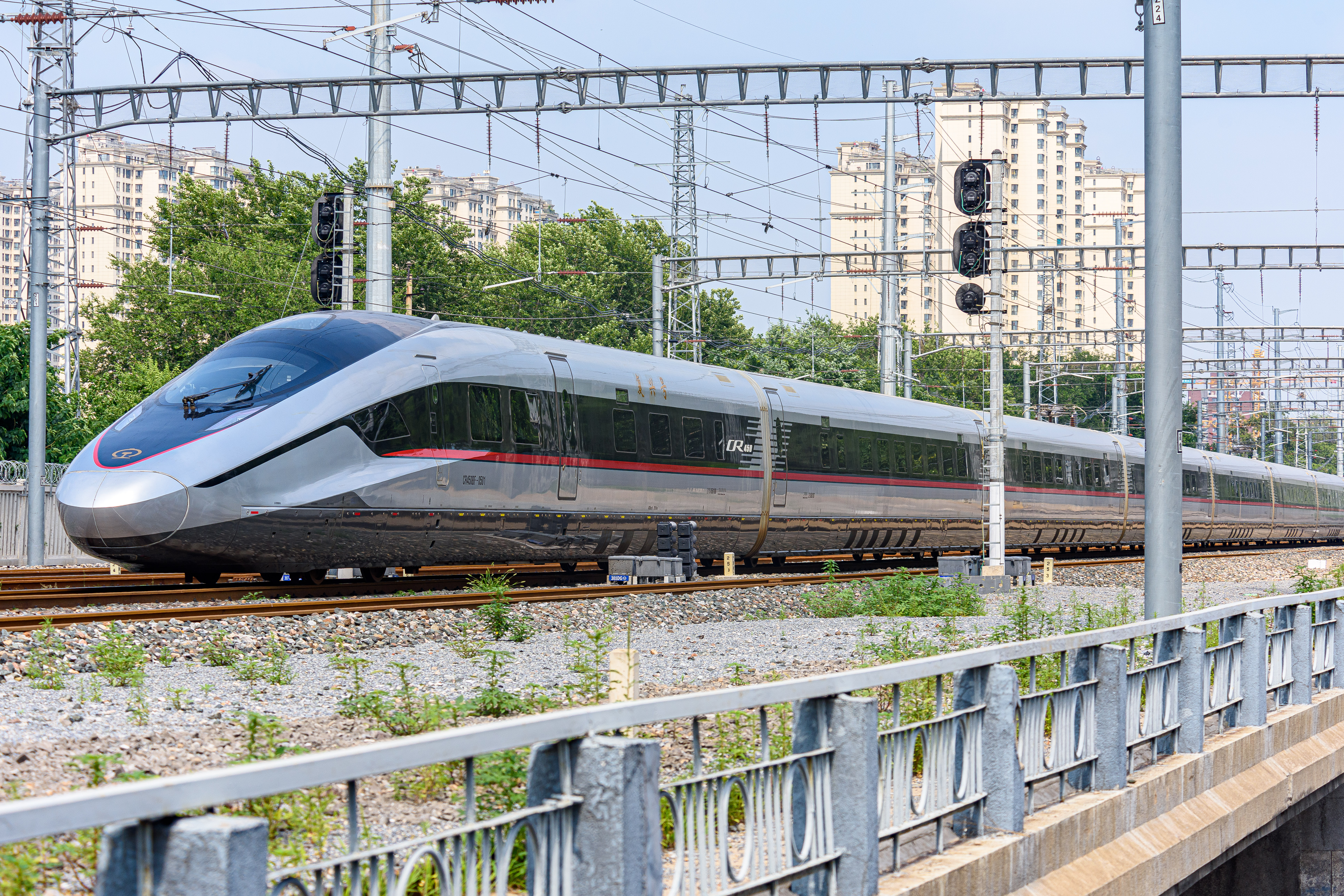
CR450BF high speed EMU

- China Railway
  - Type 25Z AC high-speed passenger cars
  - NZJ2 "Shenzhou" Double Deck DMU
  - "Jinlun" Double Deck DMU
  - SYZ25 "Lushan" Double-deck DMU
  - Type SYZ25B AC Double Deck Coach
  - China Railways CRH3 High Speed Trains - with Tangshan Railway Vehicle and based on the Siemens Velaro platform
  - China Railways CRH5 High Speed Trains - based on Alstom's New Pendolino ETR 600
  - China Railways CRHCJ-1
  - CR400BF
  - CR450BF
  - China Railways CRHCJ-5
- Beijing Subway (Line 1, Line 2, Line 5, Line 6, Line 9, Line 10, Line 13, Line 14, Line 15, Line 16, Yizhuang line, Fangshan line, Yanfang line and Airport Express)
- Tianjin Metro (Line 1, Line 9)
- Shenzhen Metro (Line 1, Line 2, Line 3, Line 5, Line 7, Line 9) licensed from Bombardier Transportation
- Chongqing Rail Transit
  - monorail cars for Line 2 and Line 3 with Hitachi
  - heavy-rail cars for Line 1 & Line 6
- Guangzhou Metro - Movia metro cars licensed from Bombardier Transportation
- Wuhan Metro Class B cars (Line 1, Line 2, Line 3)
- Optics Valley Traffic System LRV in Wuhan - 100 cars
- Shanghai Metro
  - 03A02, 04A02, 05C02, 06C02, 06C03, 06C04, 08C02, 08C03, 08C04, 15A01 and 17A01
  - 09A01, 07A01, 09A02 and 12A01 licensed from Bombardier Transportation
- All Changchun Rail Transit metro and monorail trains
- Shenyang Metro (Line 1)
- Shenyang Modern Tram
- Guangfo Metro (Line 1)
- Xi'an Metro (Line 2)
- Harbin Metro
- Nanchang Metro (Line 1, Line 2)
- Chengdu Metro (Line 3, Line 4)
- Lanzhou Metro (Line 1)

=== Export ===
- Pyongyang Metro (North Korea) - DK4 (archived)
- Tehran Metro (Iran) - Line 1 and Line 4
- Colombia: Teamed with Bombardier to supply metro cars and equipment to Bogotá Metro
- Passenger cars for Sri Lanka
- BTS Skytrain
  - Silom line 17 4-car sets (Bangkok, Thailand)
  - Sukhumvit line 24 4-car sets for the north extensions in Sukhumvit Line (Bangkok, Thailand)
- Mashhad Light Rail (Iran)
- Mecca Metro and Al Mashaaer Al Mugaddassah Metro Southern Line (Saudi Arabia)
- Hong Kong MTR
  - Urban Lines C-train (8-car sets for Kwun Tong line, 3-car variant for South Island line)
  - TML C-train (8-car sets for Tuen Ma line)
- Passenger cars for Argentina
- Sydney Trains (Australia) - A & B-set double-deck EMUs (final assembly by Downer Rail's Cardiff Locomotive Workshops)
- Rio de Janeiro Metro (Brazil) - Line 1A metro cars
- SuperVia (Rio de Janeiro, Brazil) - Commuter EMUs
- Buenos Aires Underground (Argentina)
  - 200 Series and 500 Series for Line A and Line C
  - 400 Series for Line B
- Addis Ababa Light Rail (Ethiopia)
- The following are built at the Springfield, Massachusetts factory:
  - Red and Orange line cars for the Massachusetts Bay Transportation Authority (MBTA)
  - Double-deck car for SEPTA Southeastern Pennsylvania Transportation Authority (contract cancelled)
  - HR4000 cars for Los Angeles Metro Rail B and D lines
- Tel Aviv (Israel) - Red Line for NTA
- Metro Trains Melbourne (Australia) - High Capacity Metro Trains (final assembly at Newport Workshops, Melbourne)
- Double-deck passenger cars for Iran
- Passenger cars for Pakistan
- Passenger cars for Bangladesh
- KiwiRail (New Zealand) - 50 passenger car bogies
- MRT (Singapore)
  - Bombardier Movia C951/C951A cars for Downtown line with Bombardier Transportation (owned by Land Transport Authority and operated by SBS Transit)
  - Alstom Movia R151 cars for North South line & East West line with Alstom, initially Bombardier (owned by Land Transport Authority and operated by SMRT Trains)
- Express Rail Link (Malaysia)
  - 2 trainsets of 4-car CRRC Equator EMU for KLIA Ekspres
  - 4 trainsets of 4-car CRRC Equator EMU for KLIA Transit
- Colombia Bogota Metro Line 1
- Colombia Bogota Western RegioTram
