= KLIA T2 ERL station =

Railway station in Malaysia

KE3 KT6 KLIA T2
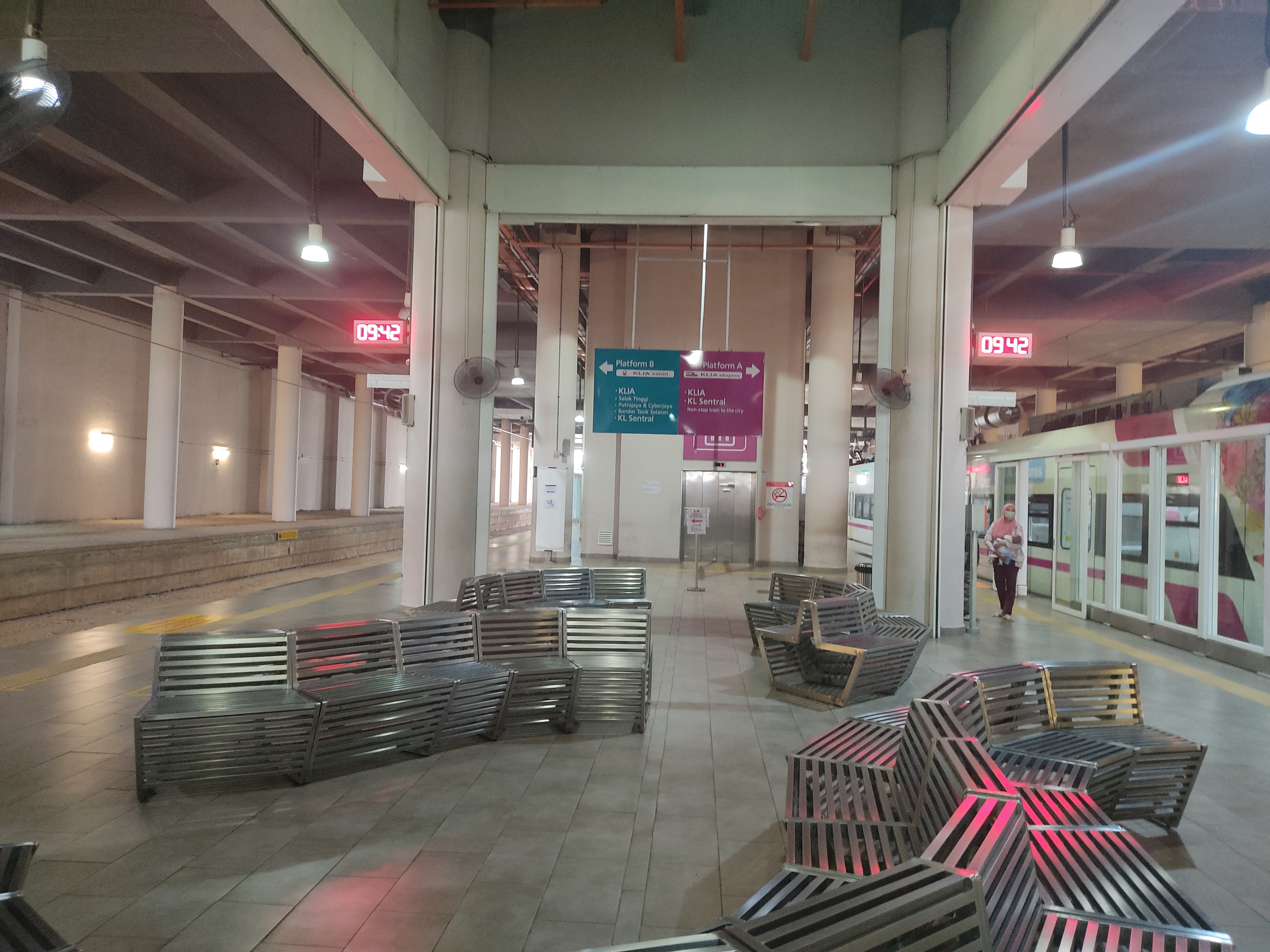
- The service signage platform of KLIA Ekspres & KLIA Transit

General information
- Other names: Malay: Terminal 2 Lapangan Terbang Antarabangsa Kuala Lumpur; Chinese: 吉隆坡国际机场第二航站楼; Tamil: கோலாலம்பூர் பன்னாட்டு வானூர்தி நிலையம் T2
- Location: KLIA, Sepang, Selangor, Malaysia.
- Coordinates: 2.74°N 101.69°E
- System: | Airport rail link station
- Owner: Express Rail Link Sdn Bhd
- Lines: 6 KLIA Ekspres; 7 KLIA Transit
- Platforms: 1 island platform
- Tracks: 2

History
- Opened: 1 May 2014; 12 years ago
- Former names: KLIA2

Services
Preceding station	Express Rail Link	Following station
KLIA T1 towards Kuala Lumpur Sentral	KLIA Transit	Terminus
KLIA T1 towards Kuala Lumpur Sentral	KLIA Ekspres	Terminus
Location

KLIA T2 ERL station (formerly known as KLIA2) is a station on the Express Rail Link (ERL) which serves Terminal 2, the low-cost carrier terminal at Kuala Lumpur International Airport (KLIA), Malaysia. The second ERL station to serve the airport, it began operations on 1 May 2014 in conjunction with the opening of Terminal 2 (then known as klia2). The station is located on Level 2 at the Gateway@klia2 complex. It is served by both lines of the ERL system, KLIA Ekspres and KLIA Transit.

The station consists of a single island platform. Similar to the arrangement at the KLIA T1 ERL station, both services use the opposing side of the platform. KLIA Ekspres uses Platform A, while KLIA Transit uses Platform B.

KLIA T2 ERL station is the southern terminus of the ERL lines. All ERL trains stop at this station and KLIA T1 station. From the Terminal 1 station towards the Kuala Lumpur city centre, KLIA Ekspres runs non-stop to KL Sentral, while KLIA Transit calls at three intermediate stops before terminating at KL Sentral.

== See also ==
- Public transport in Kuala Lumpur
