= KLIA Ekspres =

Airport rail link in Malaysia

ERL KLIA Ekspres

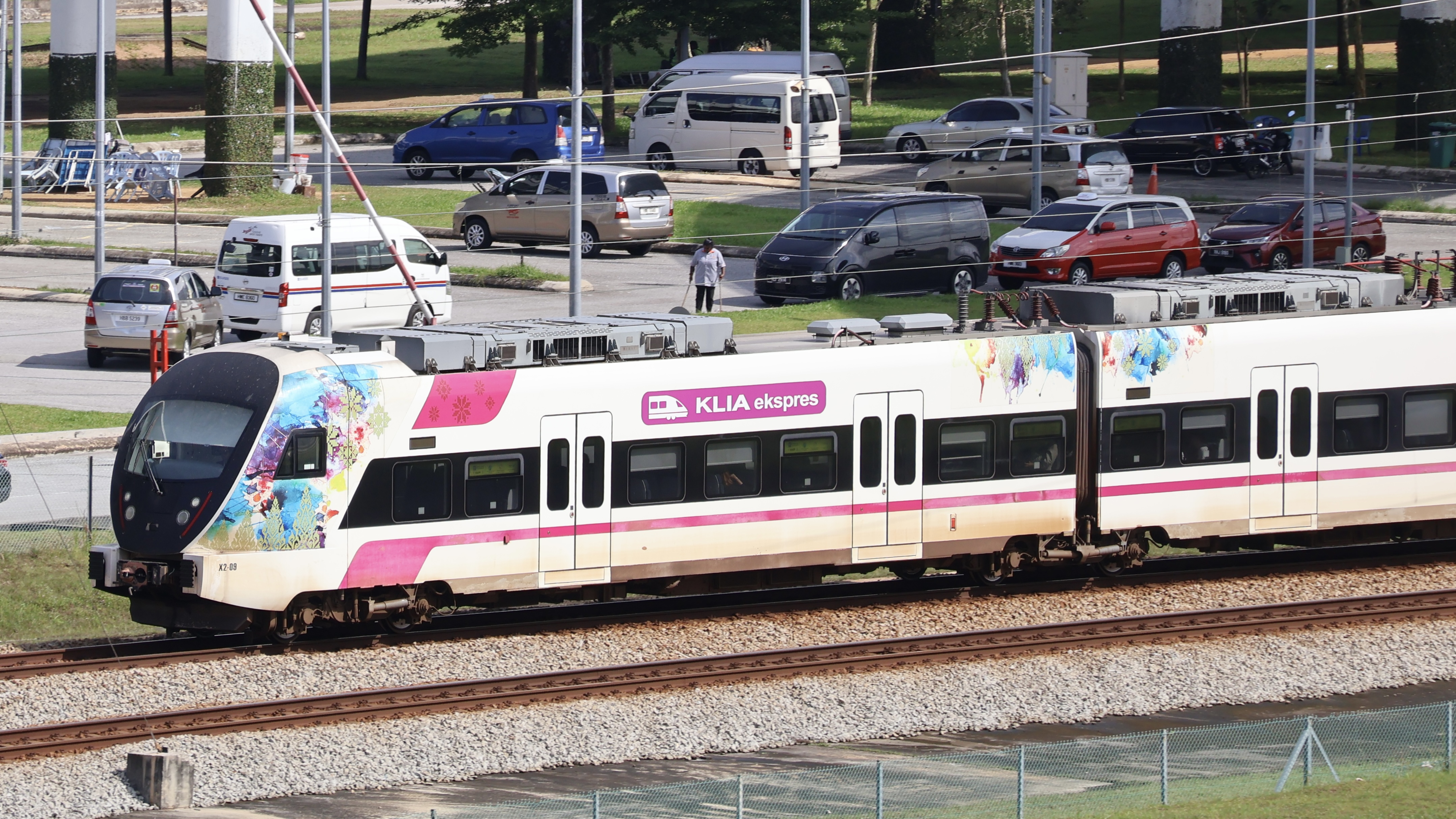

Overview
- Native name: ERL Laluan KLIA Ekspres
- Owner: Express Rail Link
- Line number: 6 (purple)
- Locale: Kuala Lumpur - KLIA
- Termini: KE1 KL Sentral; KE3 KLIA T2
- Stations: 3

Service
- Type: Non-stop direct airport rail link (commuter rail)
- System: ERL; Klang Valley Integrated Transit System
- Operator: Express Rail Link
- Rolling stock: 8 4-car Siemens Desiro ET 425 M Articulated EMU; 2 4-car CRRC Changchun Equator Articulated EMU
- Daily ridership: 5,514 (Q2 2026)
- Ridership: 2.1 million (2025) (▲11.4%)

History
- Opened: KL Sentral - KLIA Terminal 1; 14 April 2002; 24 years ago
- Last extension: KLIA Terminal 1 - KLIA Terminal 2; 1 May 2014; 12 years ago

Technical
- Line length: 57 km (35.4 mi)
- Character: Mostly on surface
- Track gauge: 1,435 mm (4 ft 8 1/2 in) standard gauge
- Electrification: 25 kV 50 Hz AC catenary
- Conduction system: With driver

Location of KLIA Ekspres

The ERL KLIA Ekspres is an express airport rail link servicing the Kuala Lumpur International Airport (KLIA) in Malaysia. It runs from KL Sentral, the main railway station of Kuala Lumpur, to KLIA's Terminal 1 and Terminal 2 stations. The line is one of the two services on the Express Rail Link (ERL) system, sharing the same tracks as the KLIA Transit. The KLIA Transit stops at all stations along the line, whereas the KLIA Ekspres runs as a direct non-stop express service between KL Sentral and KLIA Terminal 1 and 2. It is operated by Express Rail Link Sdn. Bhd. (ERL).

The line is one of the components of the Klang Valley Integrated Transit System. It is numbered 6 and coloured purple on official transit maps.

== Line information ==
KLIA Ekspres serves three stations. The service runs non-stop from KL Sentral to KLIA's Terminal 1 and Terminal 2 stations, skipping the three KLIA Transit stops in between.

Station code	Station name	Images	Platform type	Interchange station/Notes
KE1	KL Sentral		Terminal (Side)	Northern terminus. Common station with KT1 ERL KLIA Transit. Connecting station with: KA01 KS01 KTM Batu Caves-Pulau Sebang Line, KTM Tanjung Malim-Port Klang Line, KTM KL Sentral-Terminal Skypark Line and KTM ETS; KJ15 LRT Kelana Jaya Line; Linkbridge access to MR1 KL Monorail via NU Sentral shopping mall (KL Sentral Monorail); Linkbridge access to KG15 Muzium Negara on the MRT Kajang Line.
KE2	KLIA T1		Island	Common station with KT5 ERL KLIA Transit.
KE3	KLIA T2		Terminus (Island)	Southern terminus. Common station with KT6 ERL KLIA Transit.

At KL Sentral, the two platforms of the ERL are accessed from different parts of the station building. The KLIA Ekspres side platforms are accessed from the KL City Air Terminal (KL CAT) while the KLIA Transit island platform is accessed from the main Transit Concourse at Level 1. At KLIA T1 and T2, both KLIA Ekspres and KLIA Transit share the same island platform for both north-bound and south-bound trains.

At KLIA T1 station, KLIA Ekspres uses the same platform for Terminal 2- or city-bound trains. Displays are installed at the platform to indicate the travelling direction of the approaching train.

=== Extension ===
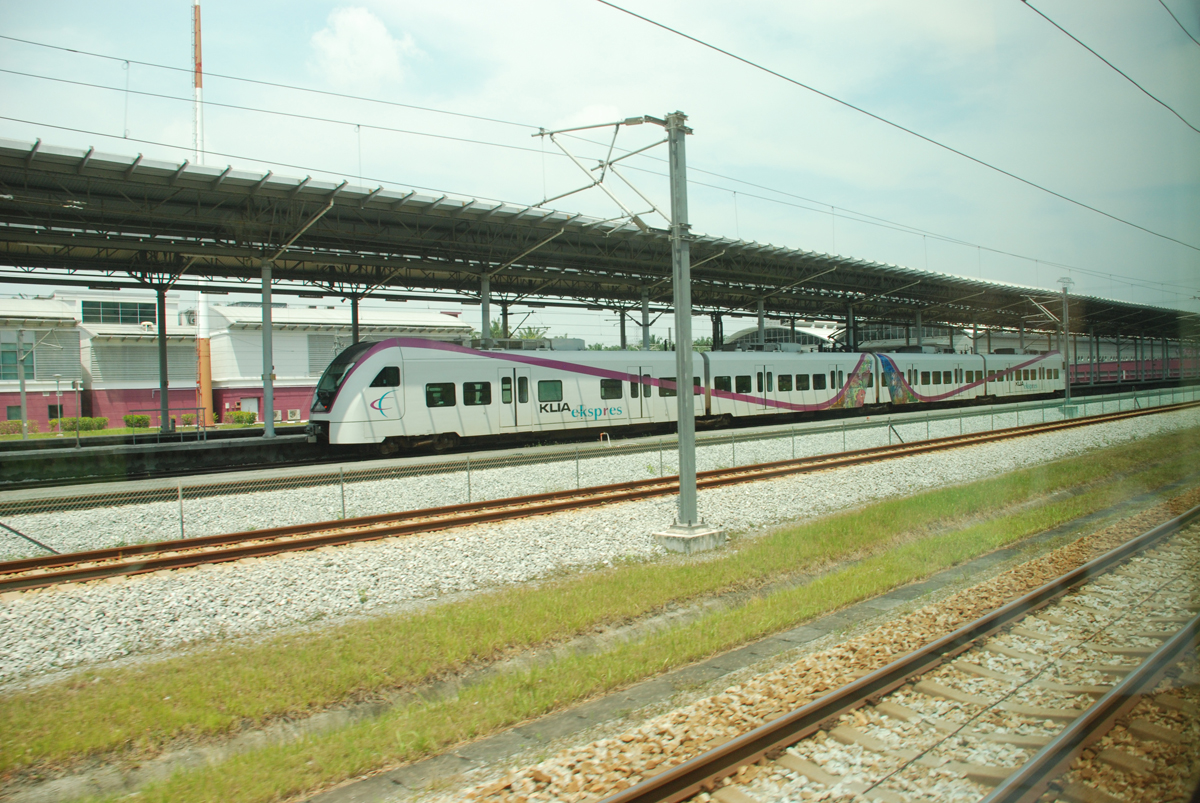
KLIA Ekspres train at Salak Tinggi depot.

A 2.14 km (1.33 mi) extension to the new terminal was completed in 2013. Commercial service began on 1 May 2014, when KLIA2 opened. Inter-terminal travel time from KLIA Main Terminal to the new terminal is 3 minutes with a fare of RM2.

== Rolling stock ==
Model	Desiro ET 425 M Electric Multiple Unit; CRRC Changchun Equator Electric Multiple Unit
Manufacturer	Siemens; CRRC Changchun Railway Vehicles
No. of trains	8 (Siemens Desiro); 2 (CRRC Changchun Equator)
No. of cars	2 power cars; 2 trailer cars
Dimensions	Length - 68.7 m (225 ft 4 3/4 in); Width - 2.84 m (9 ft 3 3/4 in); Height - 4.16 m (13 ft 7 3/4 in)
Weight	120 Metric Tonnes
Electrical System Voltage	25 kV 50 Hz AC
Acceleration	1 m/s^{2} (3.3 ft/s^{2})
Top Speed	200 km/h (124 mph)
Commercial Top Speed	160 km/h (99 mph)
Axle arrangement	Bo′(Bo)′(2)′(Bo)′Bo′
No. of passengers	156 seated
Tracks	Length - 57 km (35.4 mi); Gauge - 1,435 mm (4 ft 8 1/2 in)

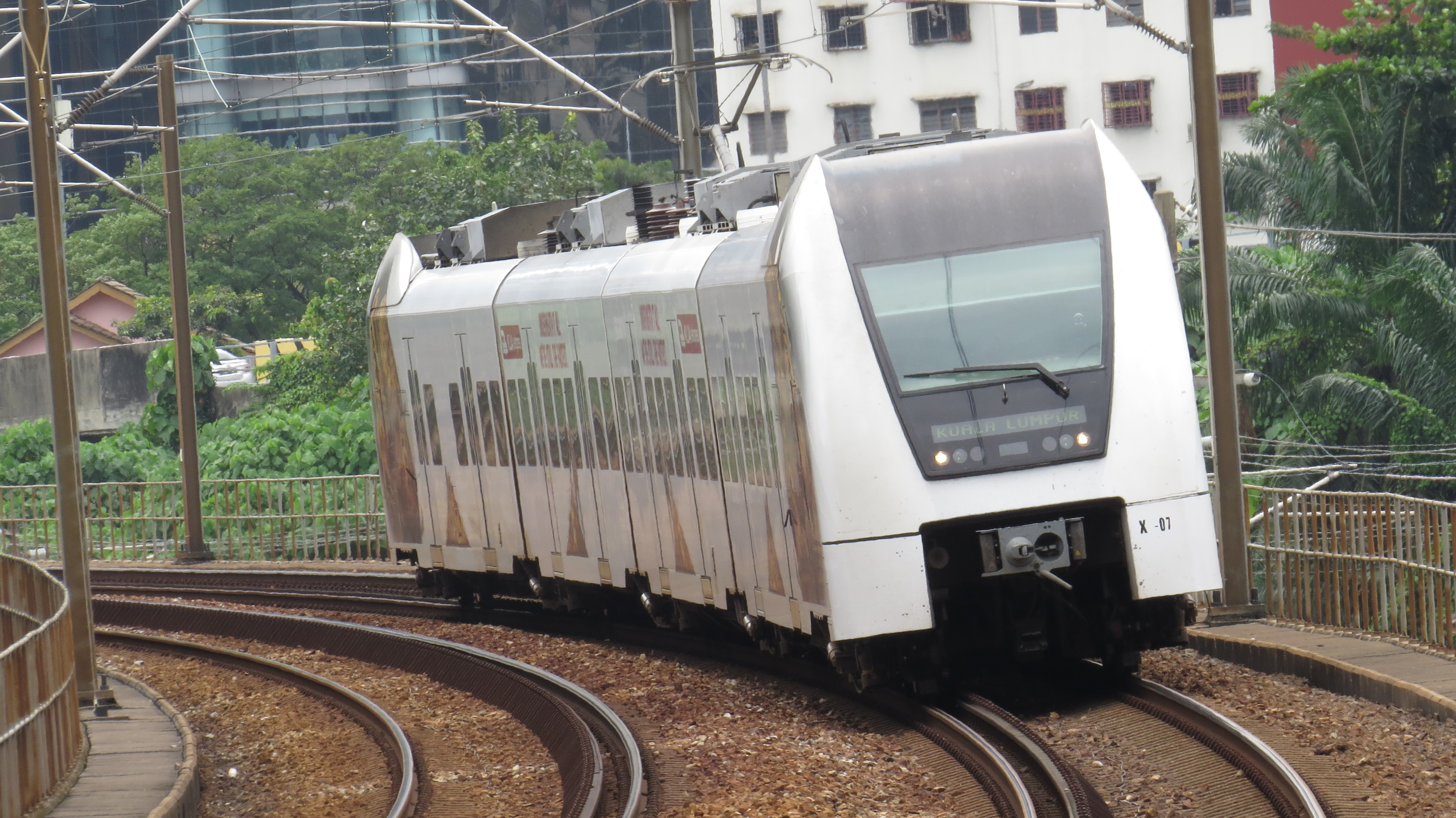
KLIA Ekspres first generation train, Siemens Desiro ET425M

Since the opening of the railway in 2002, the fleet consists of 12 4-car electric trainsets from Siemens, Germany, on which 8 trainsets were allocated to KLIA Ekspres service. The trainset, named Siemens Desiro ET425M, has a top speed of 200 km/h (120 mph) with commercial speed of 160 km/h (99 mph). This KLIA Ekspres trains has more seating than KLIA Transit trains for passenger comfort, and each train includes luggage racks beside the doors and overhead racks along the coach, along with Wi-Fi onboard. The trainset also includes VIP seatings for VIP service and toilets at the first car of the train. Luggage areas for check-in flight luggages at KL City Air Terminal are also included at the end cab on KL Sentral direction.

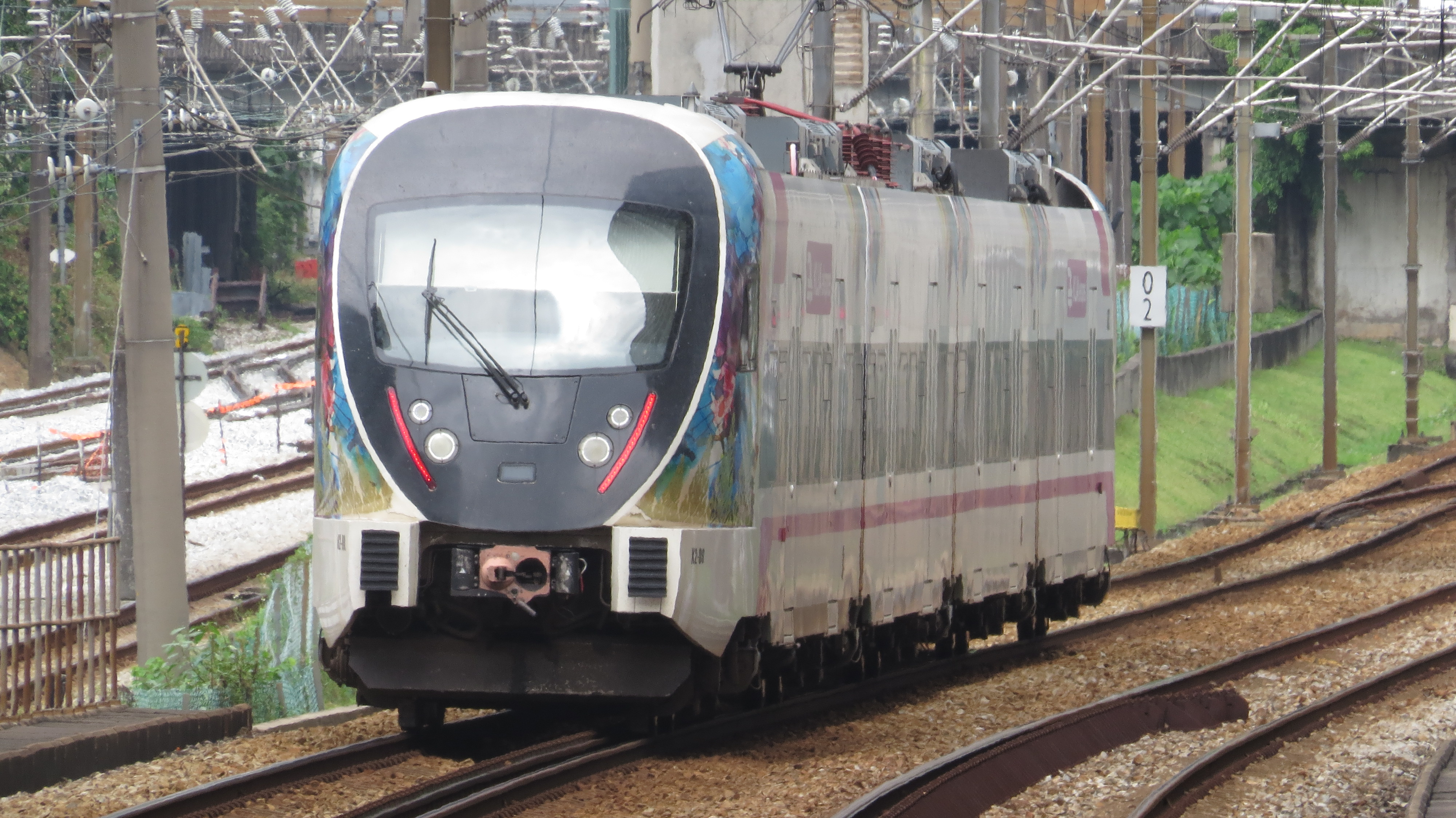
Second generation trainset, CRRC Changchun Equator EMU

To increase frequency of the line, eight new 4-car electric trainsets were brought from CRRC Changchun, in which two trainsets were allocated on KLIA Ekspres service. The trainset, nicknamed Equator, is much different from the first-generation train, which lacked toilets and luggage areas. The trainsets arrived in October 2016, and commercial operations started in March 2017.

== History ==
=== Accidents ===
On 24 August 2010, Express Rail Link suffered their first reported accident, in which 3 passengers were injured. Two ERL trains collided at Kuala Lumpur Sentral, Of the trains involved one of them was about to depart at 9:45 pm for Kuala Lumpur International Airport while the other train, which was empty, rammed into its rear.

=== Suspension in 2020 to 2022 ===
On 4 April 2020, due to the Malaysian movement control order, which resulted in a significant reduction in ridership, all ERL rail services were temporarily suspended. Limited ERL services recommenced on 4 May 2020 with KLIA Transit service patterns.

=== Service resumption ===
KLIA Ekspres service resumed on 3 January 2023. Since 1 August 2023, KLIA Ekspres trains operate at a frequency of 20 minutes on all days.

== Operations ==
KLIA Ekspres operates between 05:00 and 00:00 daily. Trains depart every 20 minutes on all days, taking 29 minutes to travel between KL Sentral and KLIA Terminal 1, and another 3 minutes between KLIA Terminal 1 and KLIA Terminal 2.

During scheduled engineering works, KLIA Ekspres and KLIA Transit run as a combined service, stopping at all KLIA Transit stations.

=== Ticketing ===
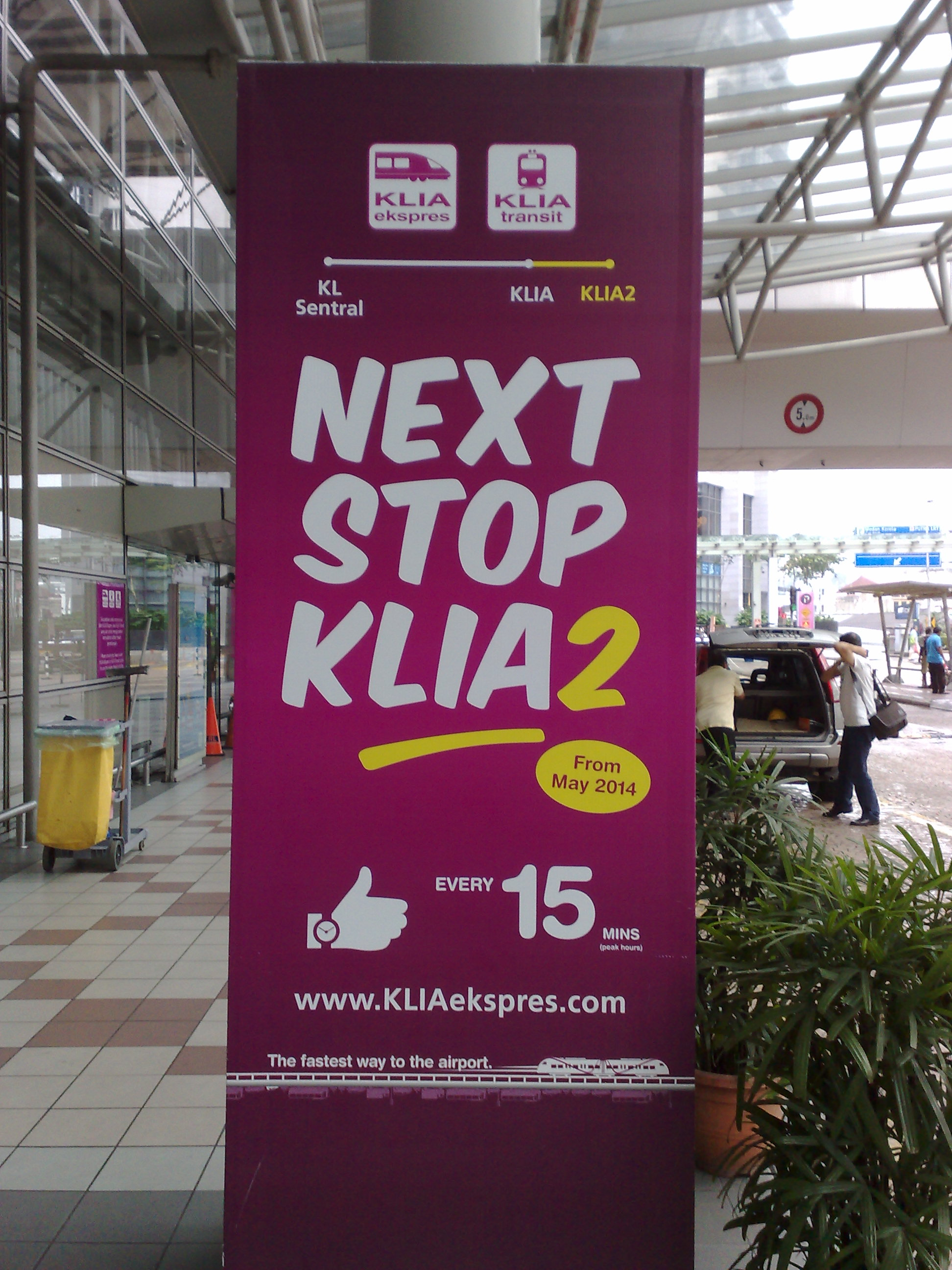
KLIA Ekspres - KLIA 2.

Tickets can be purchased from the ticketing office, at the automated ticketing machines, from KLIA Ekspres website or via the KLIA Ekspres mobile app. A one-way trip between KL Sentral and the airport costs RM55.

There is no free travel between both KLIA terminals. Passengers travelling between both terminals via KLIA Ekspres require a valid ticket.

=== Air travel facilities ===
As of 2024, check-in facilities at Kuala Lumpur Sentral station are available for Malaysia Airlines, Batik Air Malaysia and Cathay Pacific passengers only.

=== Passenger service and amenities ===
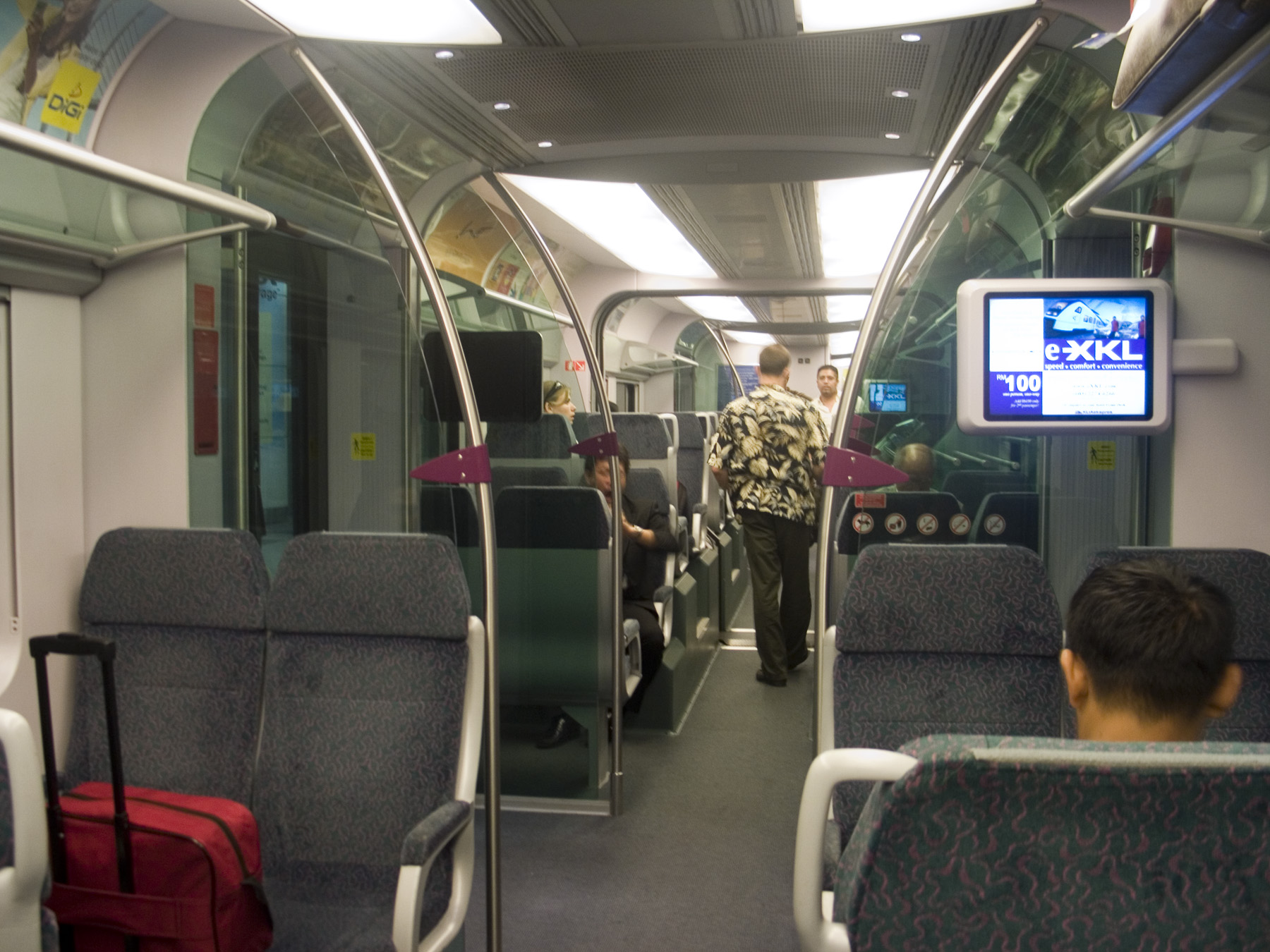
Interior of a typical KLIA Ekspres train

Passengers with laptops and smartphones have access to a high-speed internet connection free of charge through WiFi on board all KLIA Ekspres trains as well as on the station platforms. The service is powered by Yes 4G of Yes Communications, a subsidiary of the YTL Corporation which holds a 50% share over the train service.

=== Connection to Subang Airport ===
As of August 2024, KL Sentral–Terminal Skypark Line services between KL Sentral and Sultan Abdul Aziz Shah Airport (Subang Airport) remain suspended.

== Ridership ==
KLIA Ekspres Ridership
Year	Ridership	Change (%)	Remarks
2026	1,838,282		As of October 2026
2025	2,103,918	▲11.4	
2024	1,888,520	▲31.1	
2023	1,440,773	▲155.7	
2022	563,472	▲954.5	
2021	53,434	▼ -86.3	Total lockdown
2020	388,949	▼ -82	COVID-19 pandemic
2019	2,156,302	▼ -1.8	
2018	2,195,353	▼ -3.5	
2017	2,275,650	▼ -6	
2016	2,419,883	▼ -30.3	
2015	3,470,710	▲18.5	Highest on record
2014	2,928,302	▲41.9	
2013	2,063,419	▲25.1	
2012	1,649,410	▲4.8	
2011	1,581,476	▲4.8	
2010	1,508,734	▲6.3	
2009	1,419,827	▼ -10.1	
2008	1,578,706	▼ -11.3	
2007	1,780,384	▼ -3.2	
2006	1,838,723	▲14.6	
2005	1,604,404	▼ -16.1	
2004	1,912,340	▲12.7	
2003	1,697,574	▲62	
2002	1,048,201	-	Operations began on 14 April 2002

On 19 September 2005, the company celebrated its 10 millionth passenger on the KLIA express. The 10 millionth passenger was Emylia Rosnaida who won a business class return trip to New York City from Kuala Lumpur.

The 20 millionth passenger milestone was achieved on 12 December 2007 by Mr Sockalingam, which won economy class ticket to Dubai.

== Gallery ==
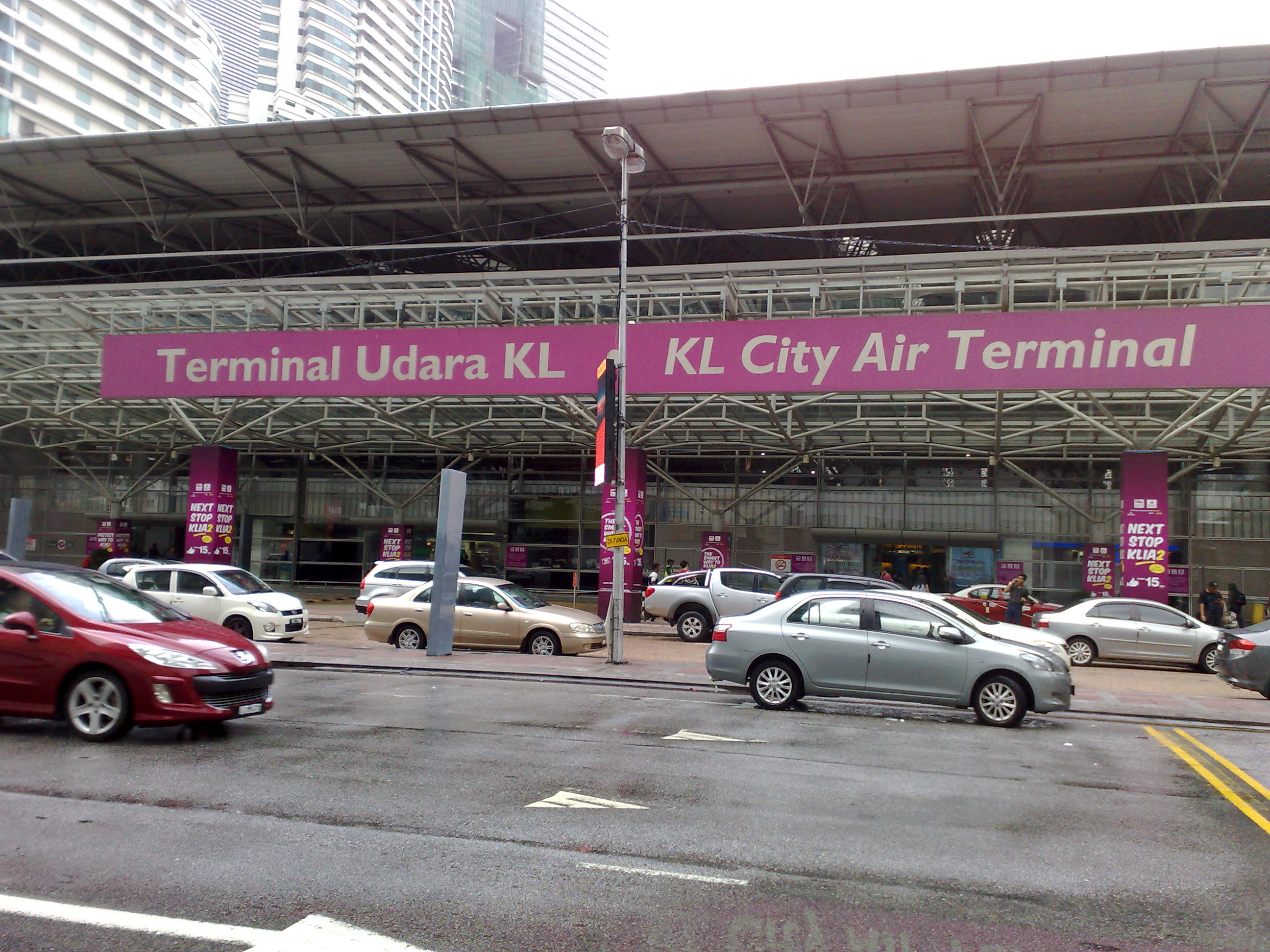
KL City Air Terminal

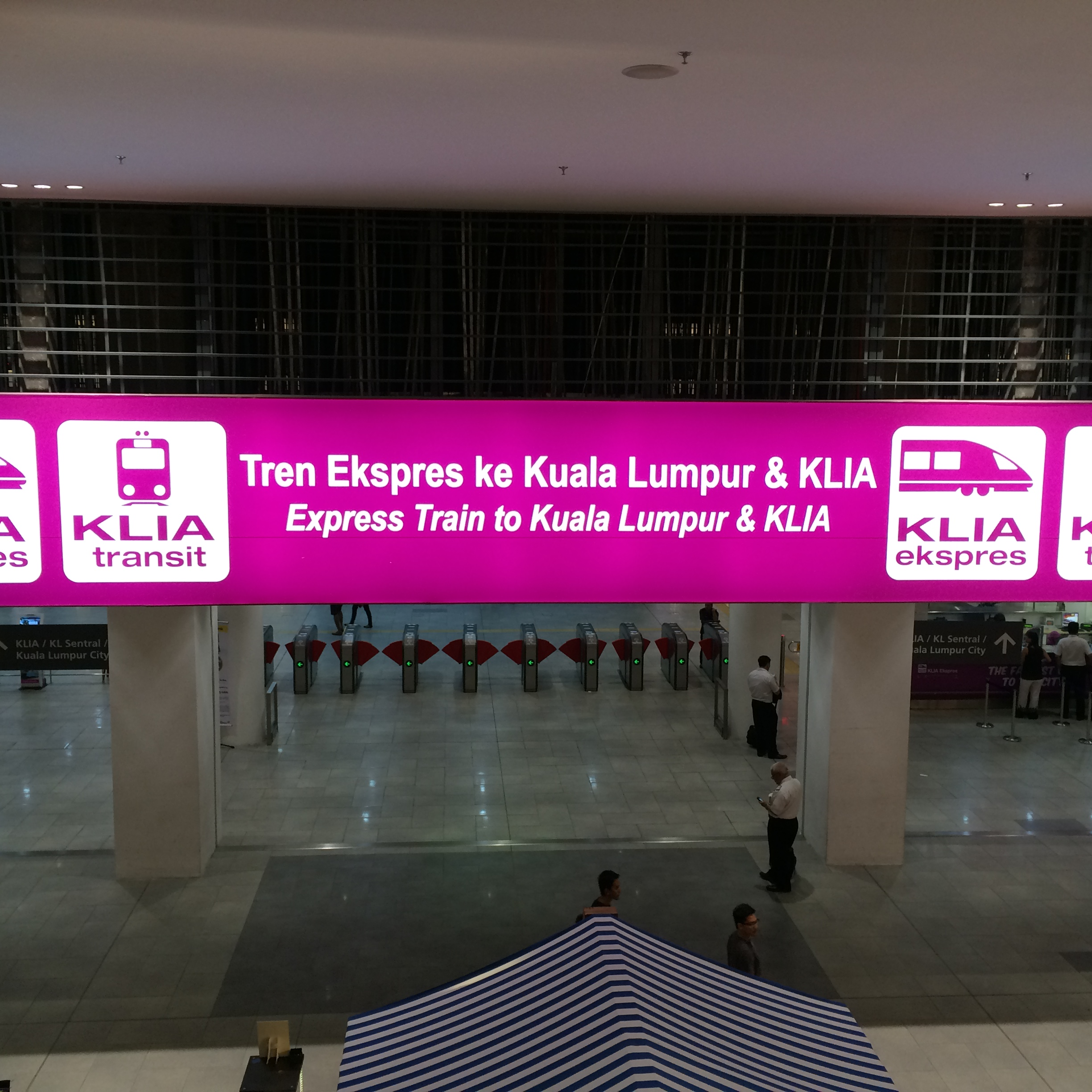
KLIA T2 station entrance at Terminal 2

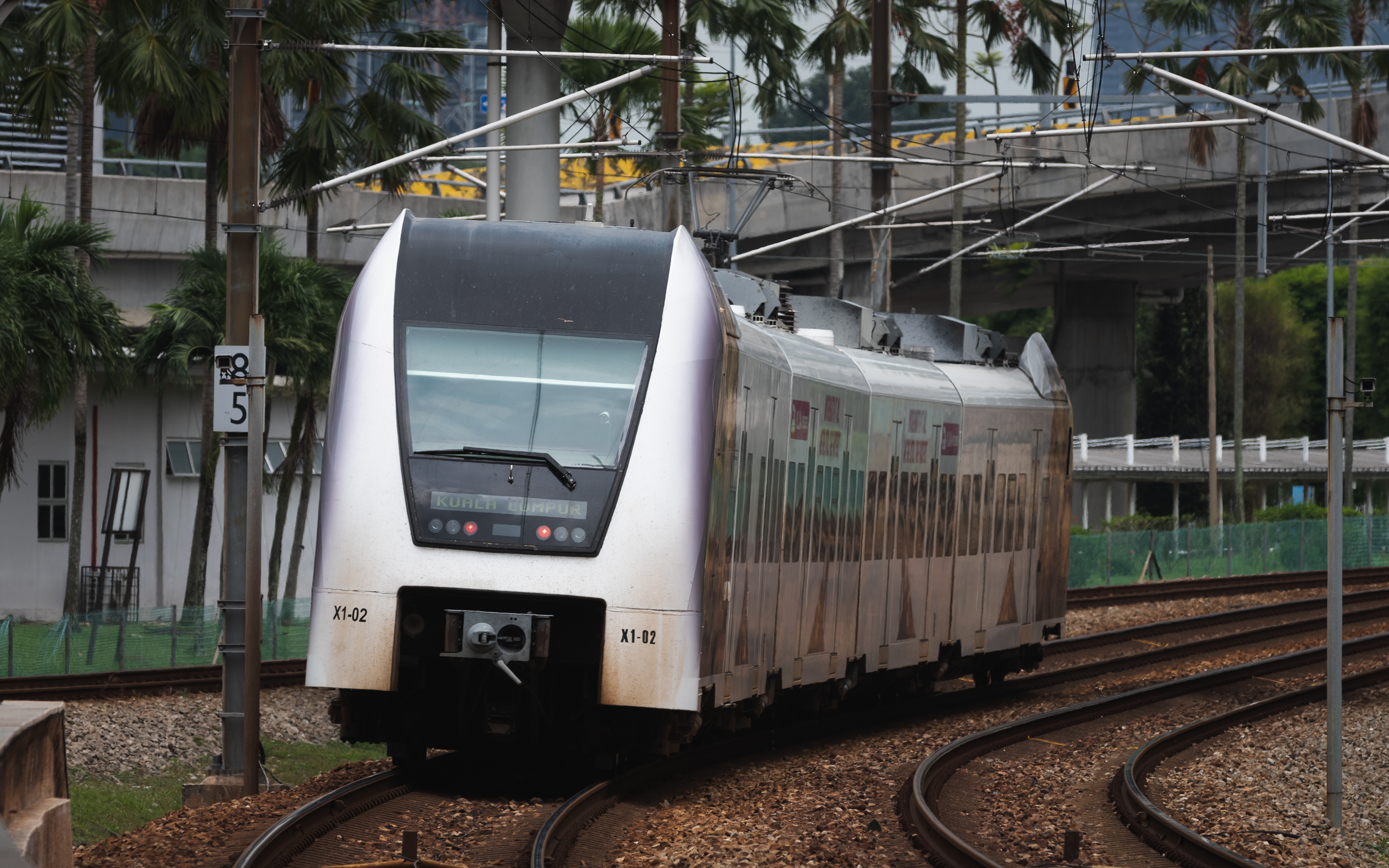
Siemens ET425M EMU train at Bandar Tasik Selatan

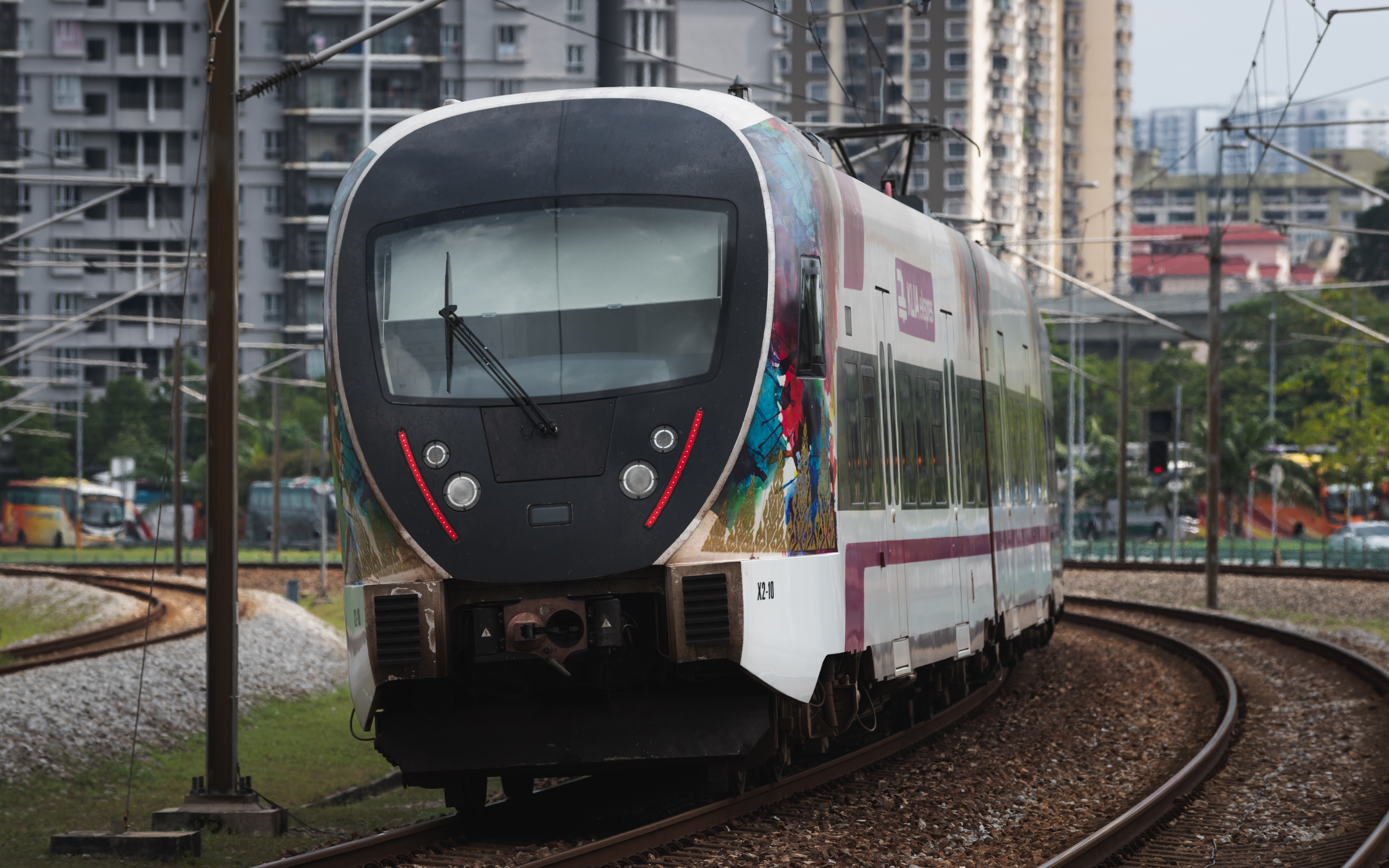
CRRC Changchun Equator EMU train at Bandar Tasik Selatan

== See also ==
- Public transport in Kuala Lumpur
