= KLIA Transit =

Railway line in Malaysia

ERL KLIA Transit

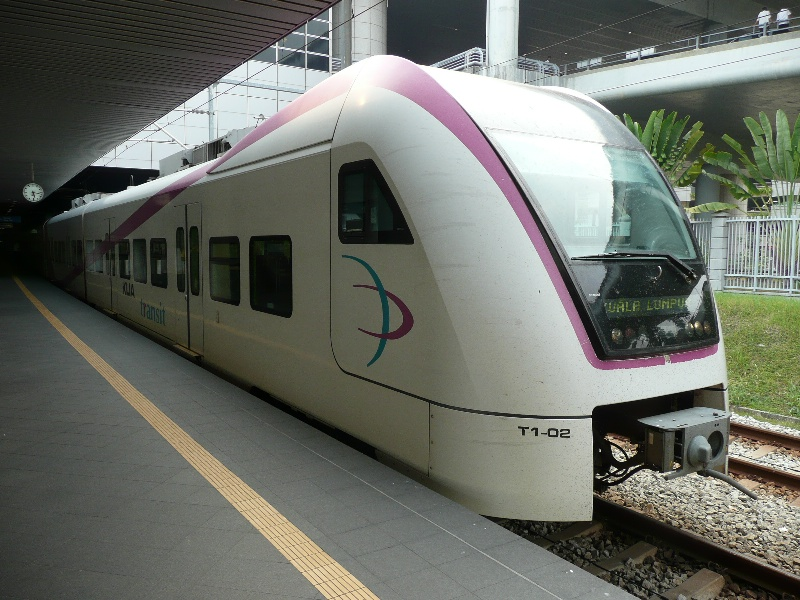
- A KLIA Transit trainset.

Overview
- Native name: ERL Laluan KLIA Transit
- Owner: Express Rail Link
- Line number: 7 (teal)
- Locale: Kuala Lumpur - Putrajaya - Salak Tinggi - KLIA
- Termini: KT1 KL Sentral; KT6 KLIA T2
- Stations: 6

Service
- Type: Commuter rail (Airport rail link)
- System: ERL; Klang Valley Integrated Transit System
- Operator: Express Rail Link
- Rolling stock: 4 4-car Desiro ET 425 M Articulated EMU; 4 4-car CRRC Changchun Articulated EMU
- Daily ridership: 20,341 (Q2 2026)
- Ridership: 7.19 million (2025) (▲17%)

History
- Opened: KL Sentral - KLIA Terminal 1; 14 April 2002; 24 years ago
- Last extension: KLIA Terminal 1 - KLIA Terminal 2; 1 May 2014; 12 years ago

Technical
- Line length: 57 km (35 mi)
- Character: Mostly subsurface Surface (Bandar Tasik Selatan - Salak Tinggi)
- Track gauge: 1,435 mm (4 ft 8 1/2 in) standard gauge
- Electrification: 25 kV 50 Hz AC catenary
- Conduction system: With driver

Route of KLIA Ekspres

The ERL KLIA Transit is a commuter rail service which serves as an airport rail link to the Kuala Lumpur International Airport (KLIA) in Malaysia. It runs from KL Sentral, the main railway station of Kuala Lumpur to KLIA's Terminal 1 and Terminal 2. The line is one of the two services on the Express Rail Link (ERL) system, sharing the same tracks as the KLIA Ekspres. KLIA Transit stops at all stations along the line, whereas KLIA Ekspres runs an express, non-stop service between KL Sentral and the airport. The line is operated by Express Rail Link Sdn. Bhd. (ERL).

The line is one of the components of the Klang Valley Integrated Transit System. It is numbered 7 and coloured teal on official transit maps.

== Line information ==
=== Stations ===
There are six stations served by KLIA Transit. They are, from north to south:

Station code	Station name	Images	Platform type	Interchange station/Notes
KT1	KL Sentral		Terminus (Island)	Northern terminus. Common station with KE1 ERL KLIA Ekspres. Connecting station, without paid-area integration, to: KA01 KS01 KTM Batu Caves-Pulau Sebang Line, KTM Tanjung Malim-Port Klang Line, KTM KL Sentral-Terminal Skypark Line and KTM ETS; KJ15 LRT Kelana Jaya Line; Linkbridge access to MR1 KL Monorail via NU Sentral shopping mall (KL Sentral Monorail); Linkbridge access to KG15 Muzium Negara on the MRT Kajang Line.
KT2	Bandar Tasik Selatan		Side	Connecting station with: KB04 KTM Batu Caves-Pulau Sebang Line and KTM ETS; SP15 LRT Sri Petaling Line; Terminal Bersepadu Selatan (TBS) Bus Hub.; Feeder bus T410 to KG26 Taman Connaught for the MRT Kajang Line.
KT3	Putrajaya & Cyberjaya		Side	Connecting station to PY41 Putrajaya Sentral for MRT Putrajaya Line. Planned interchange with Putrajaya Monorail
KT4	Salak Tinggi		Side	
KT5	KLIA T1		Island	Common station with KE2 ERL KLIA Ekspres.
KT6	KLIA T2		Terminus (Island)	Southern terminus. Common station with KE3 ERL KLIA Ekspres.

At KL Sentral, the two platforms of the ERL are accessed from different parts of the station. The KLIA Ekspres side platforms are accessed from the KL City Air Terminal (KL CAT) while the KLIA Transit island platform is accessed from the main Transit Concourse at Level 1. At KLIA Terminal 1 and 2, both KLIA Ekspres and KLIA Transit use the same island platform, with each service serving only one side of the platform.

At KLIA Terminal 1 station, KLIA Transit uses the same platform for Terminal 2- or city-bound trains. Displays are installed at the platform to indicate the travelling direction of the approaching train.

== History ==
KLIA Transit began operations on 20 June 2002. Since then there has only been one major accident.

=== Accidents ===
On 24 August 2010, Express Rail Link suffered their first reported accident in which 3 passengers were injured. Two ERL trains collided at Kuala Lumpur Sentral. One of the trains involved was about to depart at 9.45pm for Kuala Lumpur International Airport while the other train, which was empty, ran into it from behind.

=== Suspensions ===
On 4 April 2020, due to the Malaysian movement control order, which resulted in a significant reduction in ridership, all ERL rail services were temporarily suspended. Limited ERL services recommenced on 4 May 2020.

On 4 June 2021, due to the total lockdown phase of the Malaysian movement control order, all ERL rail services were temporarily suspended again. ERL services resumed on 10 September 2021.

== Operations ==
Trains run between 05:00 and midnight at frequencies of 15 minutes (peak) or 30 minutes (off-peak and weekends). The total journey for the line takes around 39 minutes between KL Sentral and KLIA Terminal 2.

=== Ticketing and Fares ===
One-way and return tickets may be purchased from the ticketing office, at the automated ticketing kiosks, from KLIA Ekspres website or via the KLIA Ekspres mobile app.

There is no free travel between KLIA Terminals 1 and 2. Passengers transferring between the terminals via KLIA Transit require a valid ticket.

=== Connection to Subang Airport ===
The KLIA Transit (and KLIA Ekspres) interchanges with KTM's Skypark Link at KL Sentral, an airport-rail link serving the Sultan Abdul Aziz Shah Airport (Subang Airport). This allows for a rail connection between KLIA Terminal 1, Terminal 2 and Subang Airport.

As of August 2024, SkyPark Link services are suspended.

== Ridership ==
KLIA Transit Ridership
Year	Ridership	Change (%)	Remarks
2026	6,297,398		As of October 2026
2025	7,190,783	▲18.2	Highest on record
2024	6,085,514	▲18.3	
2023	5,143,217	▲51.9	
2022	3,384,996	▲366.9	
2021	724,997	▼ -66.9	Total lockdown
2020	2,189,136	▼ -67.7	COVID-19 pandemic
2019	6,787,707	▲3.8	
2018	6,541,492	▲1.5	
2017	6,443,667	▼ -0.6	
2016	6,485,272	▼ -0.2	
2015	6,496,617	▲3.0	
2014	6,310,323	▲44.3	
2013	4,374,220	▲17.5	
2012	3,723,536	▲15.0	
2011	3,236,795	▲23.3	
2010	2,626,121	▲46.4	
2009	1,794,080	▼ -28.5	
2008	2,508,886	▲2.4	
2007	2,449,842	▲3.4	
2006	2,369,763	▲29.6	
2005	1,829,224	▲5.5	
2004	1,734,614	▲78.7	
2003	970,598	▲416.7	
2002	187,848	-	Operations began on 20 June 2002

== Gallery ==
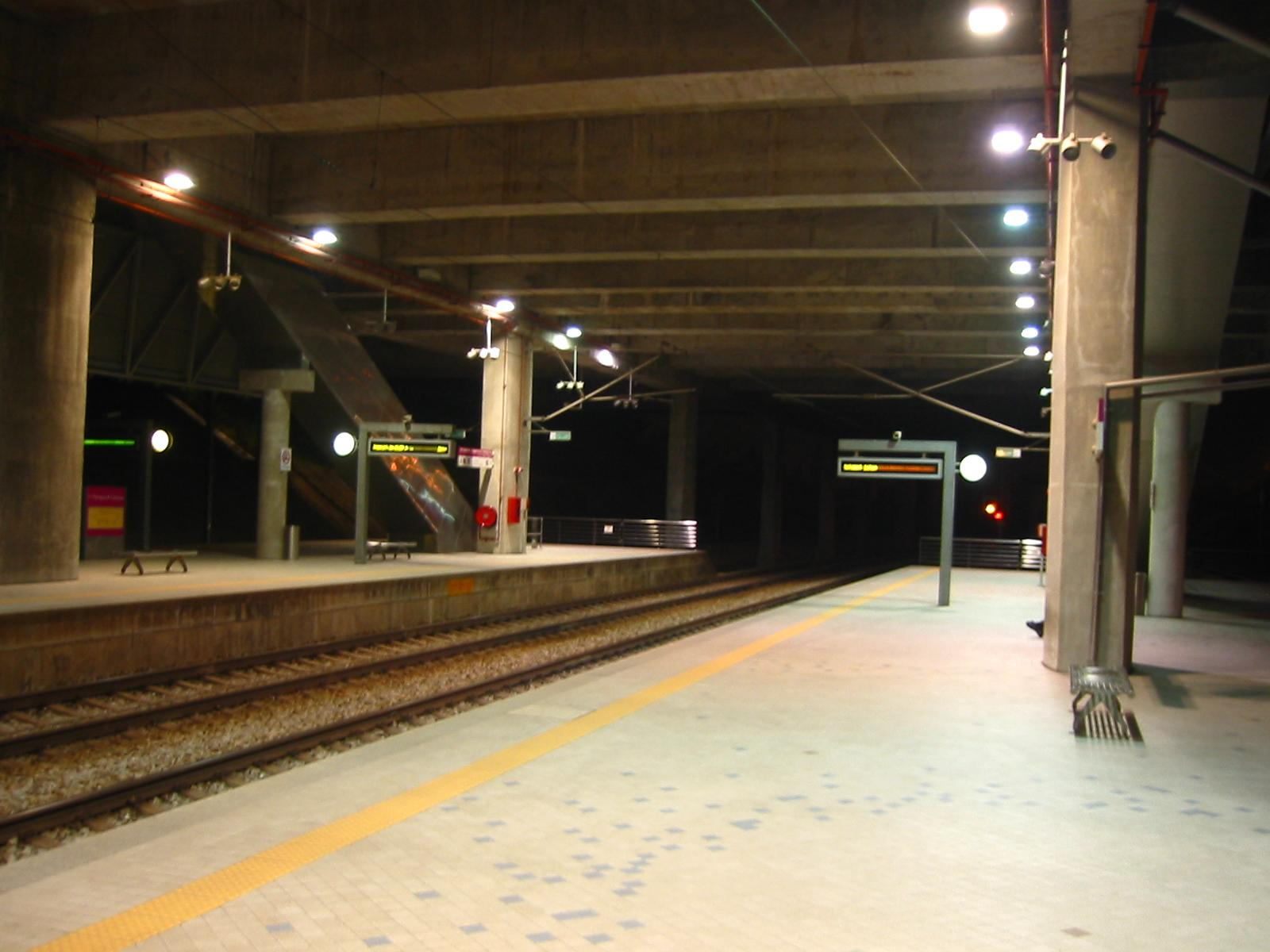
The Putrajaya & Cyberjaya ERL Station platform at night.

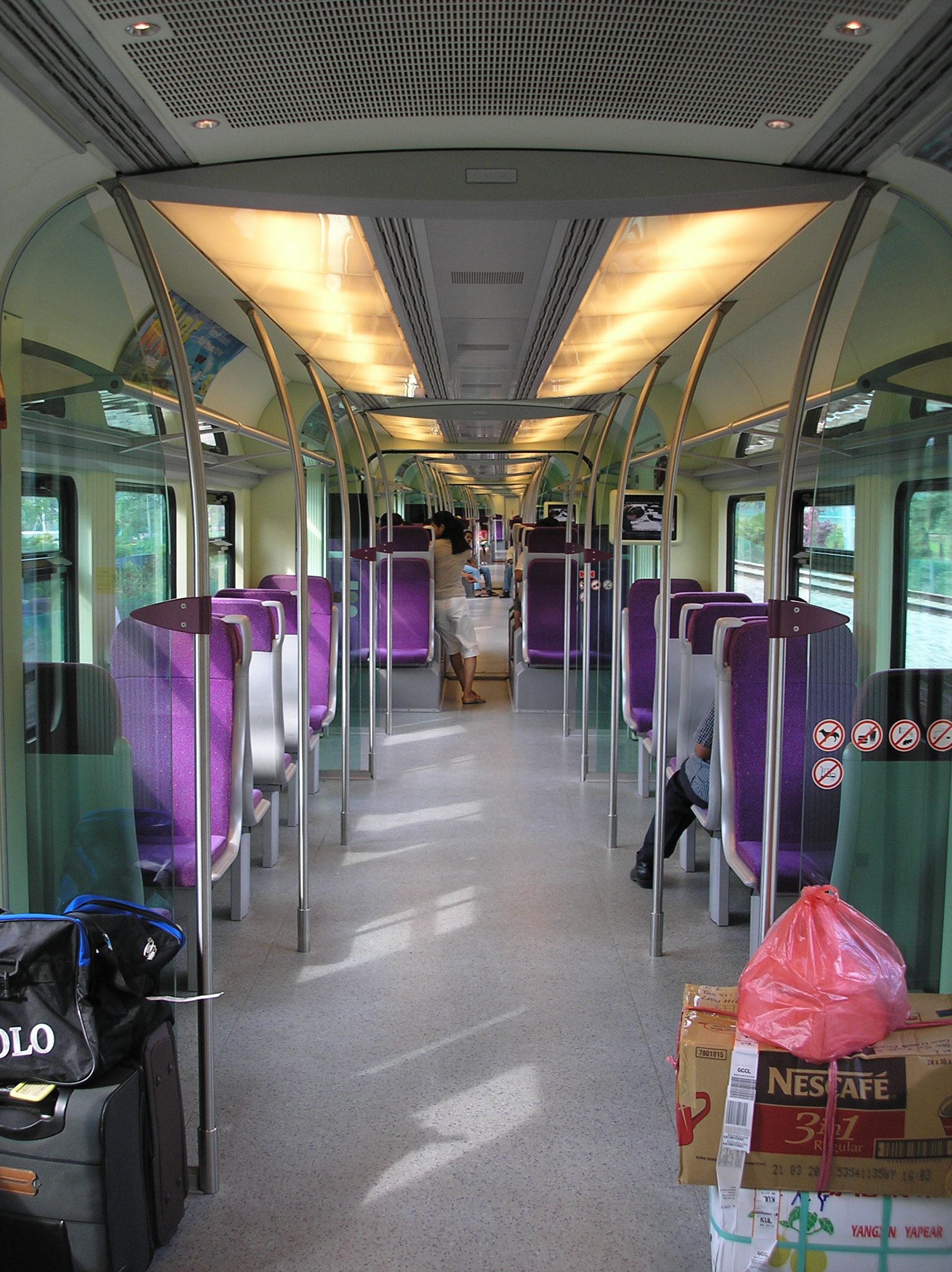
Interior of Siemens Desiro train.

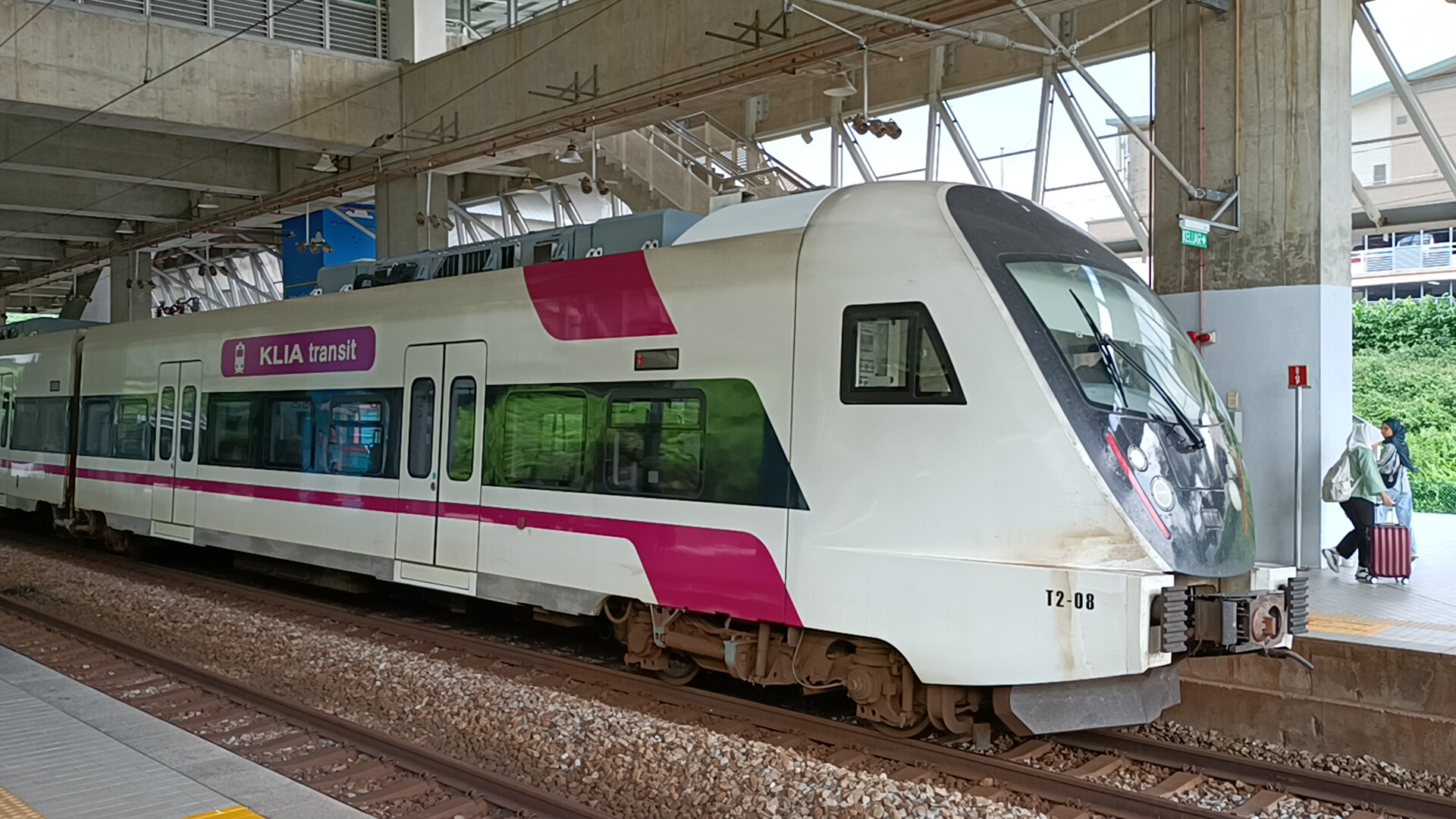
CRRC Equator EMU at Putrajaya/Cyberjaya station

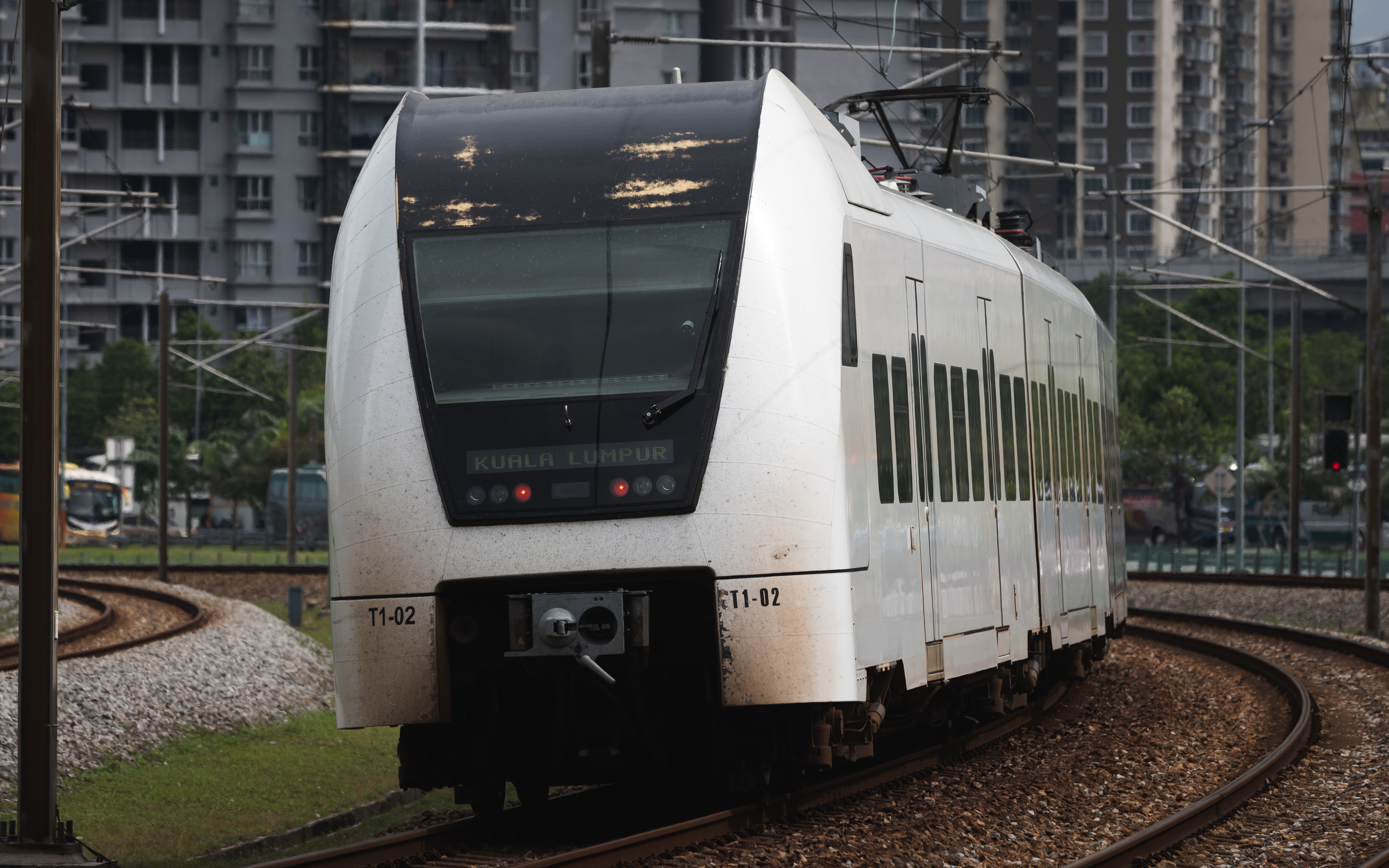
KLIA Transit Desiro ET 425 M EMU Train at Bandar Tasik Selatan Station

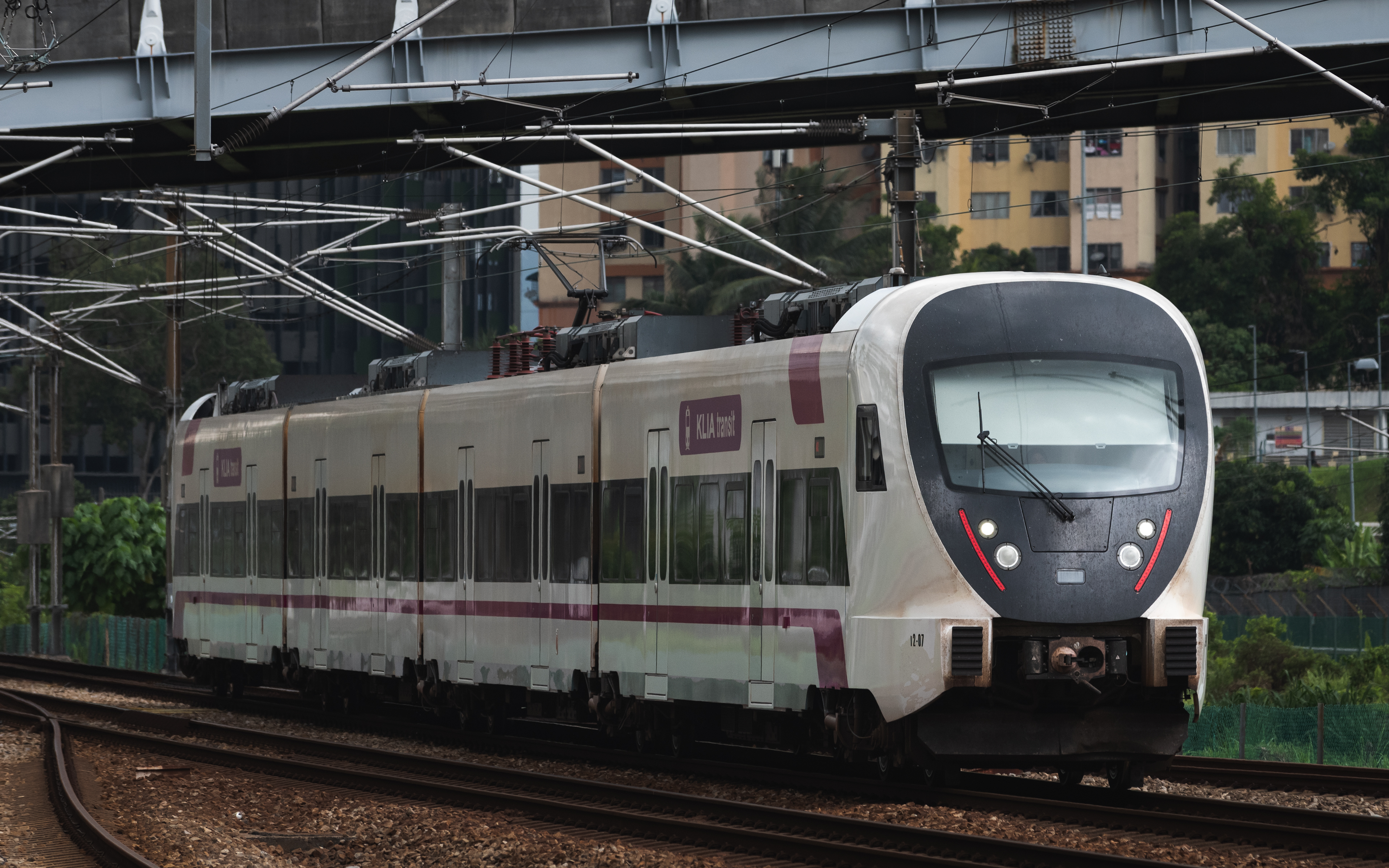
KLIA Transit Equator EMU Train at Bandar Tasik Selatan Station

== See also ==
- Public transport in Kuala Lumpur
