= Express Rail Link =

Transport company in Malaysia

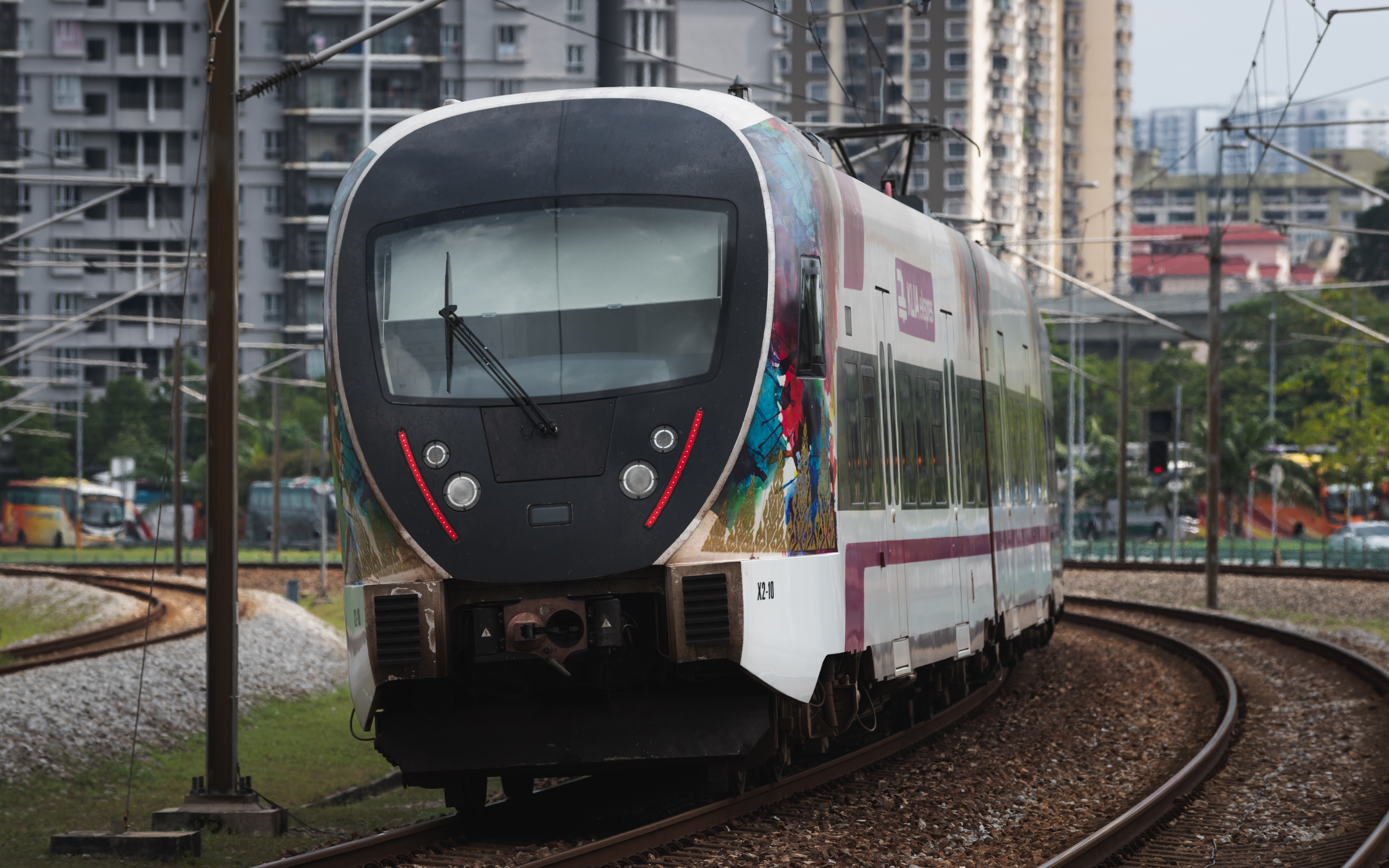
- A CRRC Changchun at Bandar Tasik Selatan

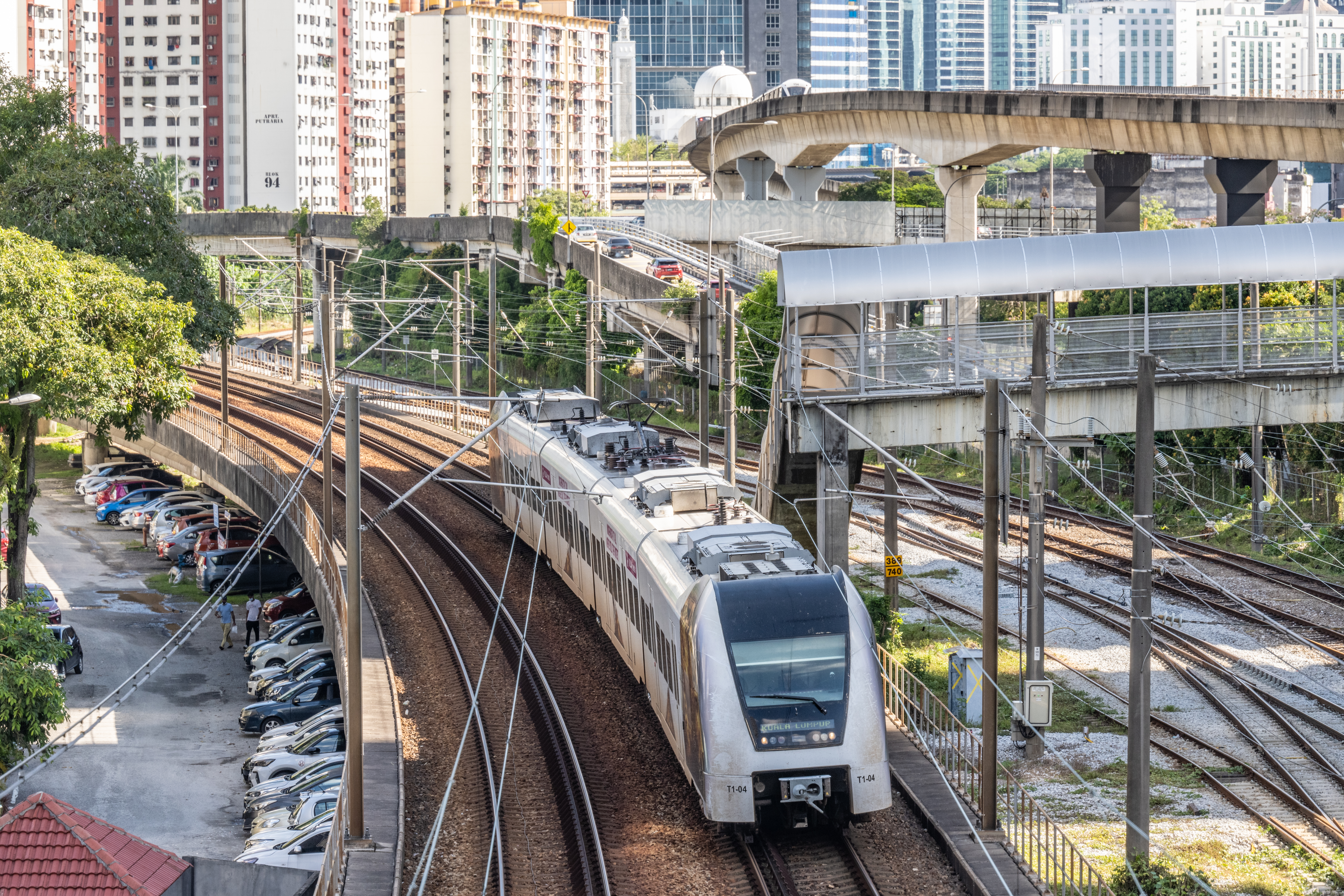
- A Siemens Desiro at Bangsar

Overview
- Owner: Express Rail Link Sdn Bhd
- Locale: Klang Valley, Malaysia
- Transit type: Airport rail link
- Number of lines: 6 7
- Number of stations: 6
- Daily ridership: 26,854 (Q2 2025)
- Annual ridership: 9.29 million (2025)
- Website: kliaekspres.com

Operation
- Began operation: 14 April 2002; 24 years ago
- Number of vehicles: 12 × 4-car Siemens Desiro ET 425 M Electric Multiple Unit; 6 × 4-car CRRC Changchun Equator Electric Multiple Unit

Technical
- System length: 57 km (35 mi) (total)
- Track gauge: 1,435 mm (4 ft 8 1/2 in) standard gauge
- Electrification: 25 kV 50 Hz AC overhead catenary
- Average speed: 145 km/h (90 mph)

The Express Rail Link Sdn Bhd is a company that owns and operates the airport rail link of the same name that connects the Kuala Lumpur International Airport (KLIA) with the Kuala Lumpur Sentral (KL Sentral) transportation hub, 57 kilometres apart. The company operates two different train services:

- KLIA Ekspres, a direct airport rail service directly from KLIA to KL Sentral, launched on 14 April 2002.
- KLIA Transit, a commuter rail service with three additional stops between KLIA and KL Sentral, launched on 20 June 2002.

== Background ==
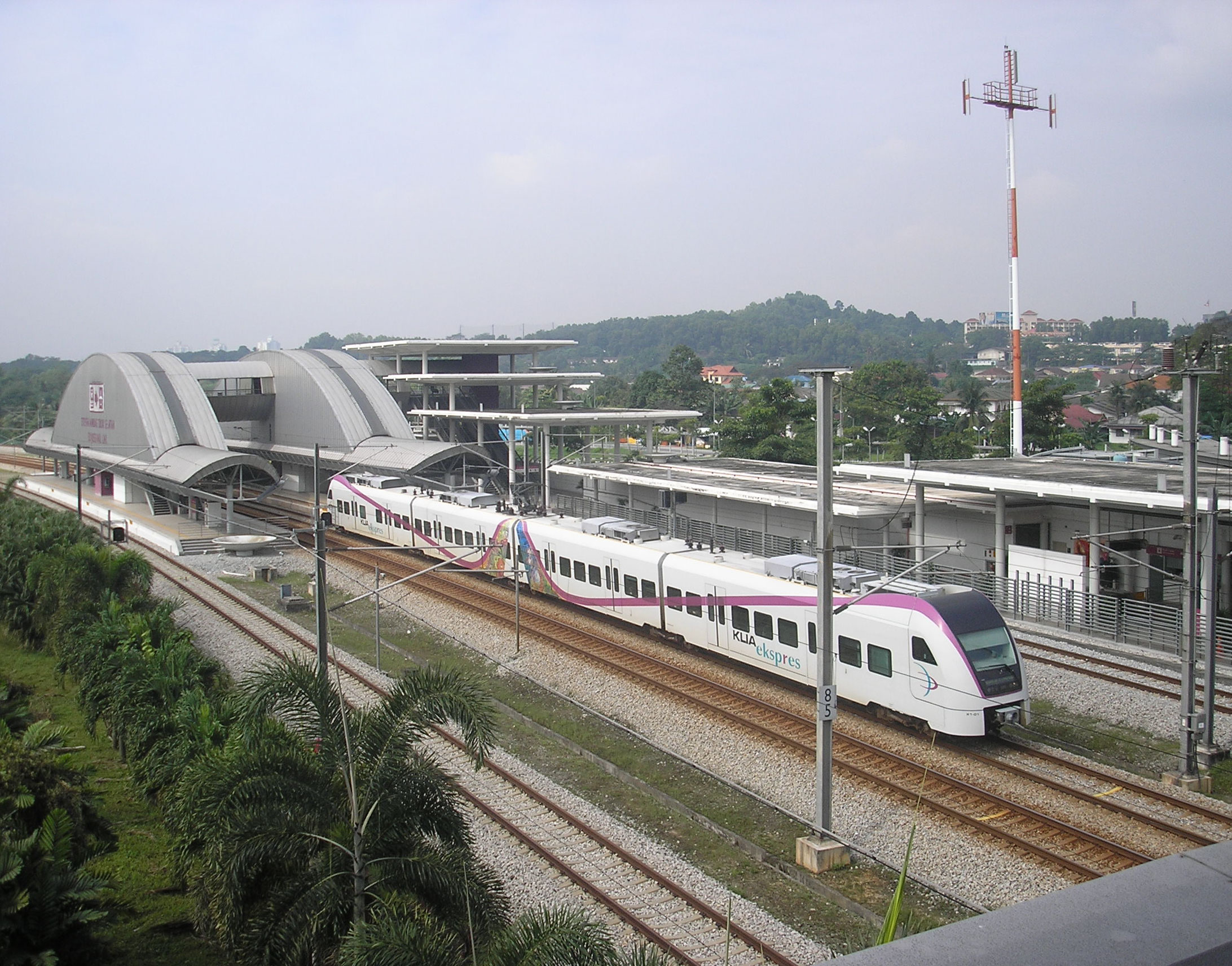
KLIA Ekspres trainset passing Bandar Tasik Selatan station.

Express Rail Link Sdn. Bhd. (ERL) is a joint venture company between YTL Corporation Berhad, Lembaga Tabung Haji, SIPP Rail Sdn. Bhd. (a company linked to Sultan Ibrahim Ismail of Johor) and Trisilco Equity Sdn. Bhd. with each partner holding 45%, 36%, 10% and 9% of the company respectively. On 25 August 1997, the Malaysian government presented the company with a 30-year concession to finance, build, maintain and control the operations of the railway.

Construction began in May 1997 and was completed 5 years later. It was then handed over to SYZ consortium, a joint relations consortium between German and Malaysian companies consisting of Siemens, Siemens Electric Engineering Sdn. Bhd and Syarikat Pembenaan Yeoh Tiong Lay Sdn. Bhd (SPYTL), a wholly owned subsidiary of YTL Corporation Bhd.

ERL Maintenance and Support was set up in 1999 and is responsible for the operations and maintenance of trains owned by ERL. The company was initially a joint venture between Express Rail Link Sdn. Bhd. and Siemens, but since June 2005 it has been wholly owned by Express Rail Link Sdn. Bhd.

The 1997 financial crisis that hit Asia caused a brief setback to the project but due to strong governmental support, the project went on to completion. The project racked up a cost of RM2.4 billion which was financed through equity mergers (RM500 million), loans from Development and Infrastructure Bank of Malaysia (RM940 million) and the remainder through import credit from four German financial institutions.

In January 2024, the concession for Express Rail Link Sdn. Bhd. to operate the KLIA Ekspres and KLIA Transit, which was originally to expire in 2017, was extended for a further 30 years (to 2059), after seven years of negotiations. The revised concession includes the introduction of “market-based”/variable fare pricing (ticket prices are currently fixed) and a profit-sharing mechanism with the government (30% of any additional profit if the rate of return exceeds 10%). ERL will still be entitled to receive a share of the Passenger Service Charge paid by all passengers departing from Kuala Lumpur International Airport until 2029.

== Units and subsidiaries ==
ERL Maintenance Support Sdn Bhd, or E-MAS, is ERL's operations and maintenance (O&M) subsidiary. E-MAS had working together with CRCC since 2012 on the operation & maintenance of Al Mashaaer Al Mugaddassah Metro Southern Line which their 13 employees were selected for the first outing in 2012 and another 29 employees were sent in 2013. In 2014 Hajj season, ERL has been working with Prasarana Malaysia to help fulfil CRCC's manpower requirements.

== Major facilities ==
- Customs, Immigration and Quarantine (CIQ) facilities
- Departure lounges
- Passenger arrival and departure halls
- Underground track area
- Duty-free outlets
- Food and beverage outlets
- Station parking

== Rolling stock ==
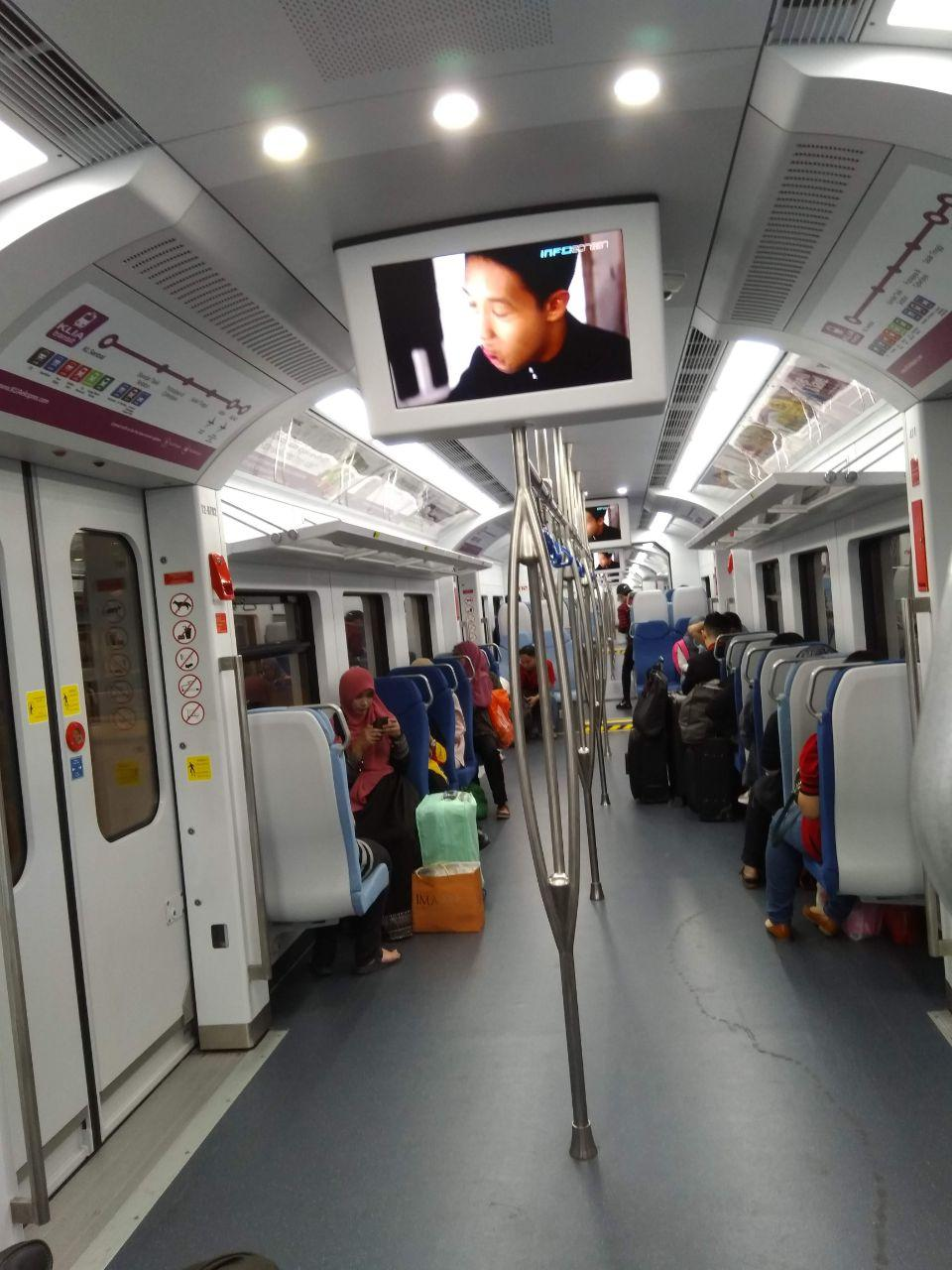
Inside the CRRC Changchun ERL Equator EMU used from KLIA Transit.

Both the KLIA Ekspres and KLIA Transit use 12 four-car Siemens Desiro ET 425 M electric multiple unit (EMU) trains. The trains are derived from and technically similar to the DBAG Class 425 used on S-Bahn systems in Germany and run at a maximum commercial speed at 160 km/h, the fastest speed for rail travel in Malaysia.

On 27 November 2014, Express Rail Link ordered from CRRC Changchun six new 4-car trains to cater to the ridership growth of both KLIA Ekspres and KLIA Transit services. CRRC's Zhuzhou plant had already supplied rolling stock to the Rapid KL Ampang Line and KTM Komuter. Of the six new trains, two will be used for KLIA Ekspres and four for KLIA Transit. Delivery of the six new trains will be made progressively from May 2016 onwards, after which testing will be done. ERL expects all six trains to be operational by November 2016.

Commercial service commenced on 13 March 2018 using CRRC Changchun Equator EMUs.

== Fleet ==
Line Code	Line Name	Formation	In service	EMU/Fleet	Manufacturers
6	KLIA Ekspres	4 cars EMU	8 trainsets (32 cars); 2 trainsets (8 cars)	Siemens Desiro ET 425 M; CRRC Changchun "Equator EMU"	(Germany) Siemens; (China) CRRC Changchun
7	KLIA Transit	4 cars EMU	4 trainsets (16 cars); 4 trainsets (16 cars)	Siemens Desiro ET 425 M; CRRC Changchun "Equator EMU"	(Germany) Siemens; (China) CRRC Changchun

== Ridership ==
KLIA Express & KLIA Transit Ridership
Year	KLIA Express	KLIA Transit	Note
2026	1,838,282	6,297,398	As of October 2026
2025	2,103,920	7,190,783	Highest on record (KLIA Transit)
2024	1,888,520	6,085,514	
2023	1,442,393	5,143,217	
2022	564,585	3,384,996	
2021	53,434	724,997	Total lockdown
2020	388,949	2,189,136	COVID-19 pandemic
2019	2,155,855	6,787,707	
2018	2,195,353	6,541,492	
2017	2,275,650	6,443,667	
2016	2,419,883	6,485,272	
2015	3,470,710	6,496,617	Highest on record (KLIA Express)
2014	2,928,302	6,310,323	
2013	2,062,223	4,374,220	
2012	1,649,410	3,713,536	
2011	1,581,476	3,236,795	
2010	1,508,734	2,626,121	
2009	1,419,827	2,441,739	
2008	1,578,706	2,508,886	
2007	1,780,384	2,449,842	
2006	1,838,723	2,369,763	
2005	1,604,404	1,829,224	
2004	1,912,340	1,734,614	
2003	1,697,574	970,598	
2002	1,048,201	187,848	Opened on 14 April 2002

== Accidents ==
On 24 August 2010, Express Rail Link suffered their first reported accident in which 3 passengers were injured. Two ERL trains collided at Kuala Lumpur Sentral, Of the trains involved one of them was about to depart at 9.45pm for Kuala Lumpur International Airport while the other train, which was empty, rammed into its rear.

== Expansion ==
A 2.14 km extension to the new KLIA2 terminal of Kuala Lumpur International Airport was completed and commercial service commenced on 1 May 2013.

There are proposals to extend the line with two to four stations to Seremban and Melaka.

Due to automatic termination of Kuala Lumpur–Singapore high-speed rail bilateral agreement after passing postponement deadline on 31 December 2020, the government planned to extend the line until Johor Bahru as an alternative for the cancelled HSR project.

== Awards and achievements ==
Year	Award	Category	Result	Ref(s)
2014	Global AirRail Awards	North Star Air Rail Link of the Year	Won	
2015	Global AirRail Awards	North Star Air Rail Link of the Year	Won	
2016	Global AirRail Awards	North Star Air Rail Link of the Year	Won	
2016	Global AirRail Awards	Social Responsibility	Won	

== Gallery ==
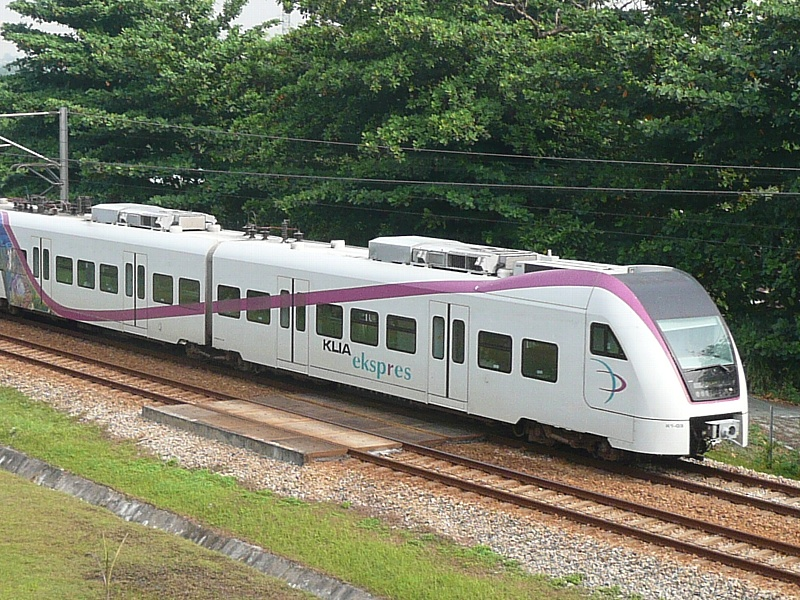
KLIA Ekspres trainset towards KL Sentral station.

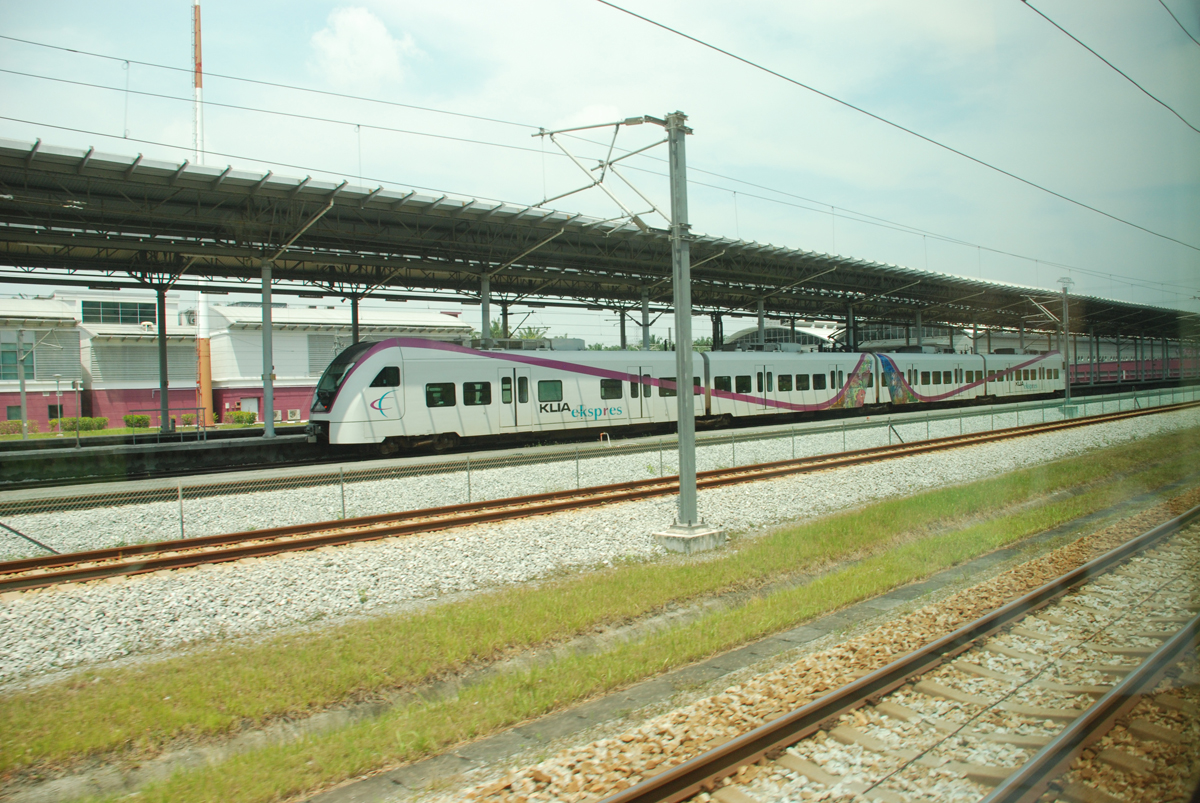
KLIA Ekspres trainset at Salak Tinggi depot.

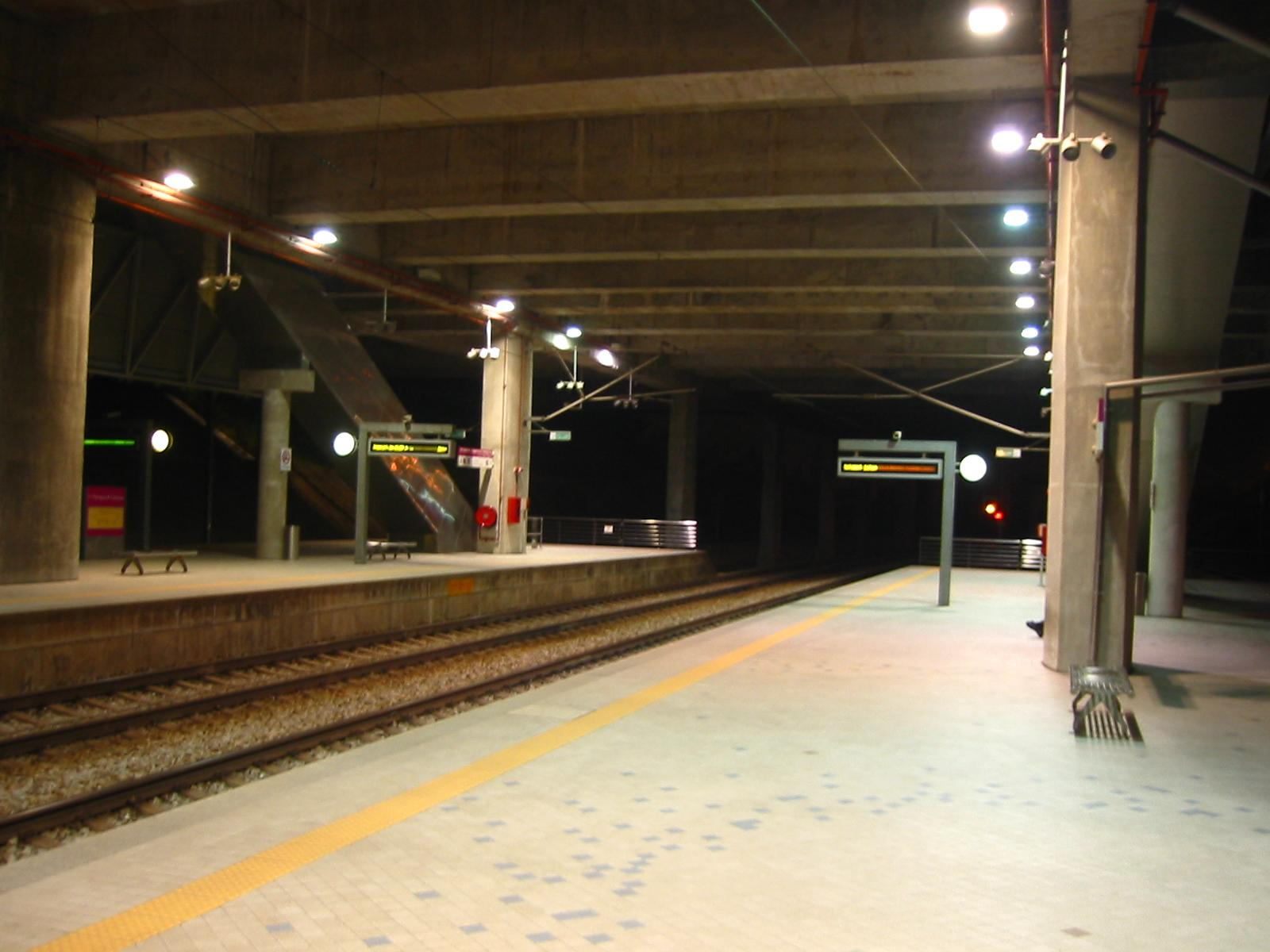
The Putrajaya/Cyberjaya ERL station platform at night.

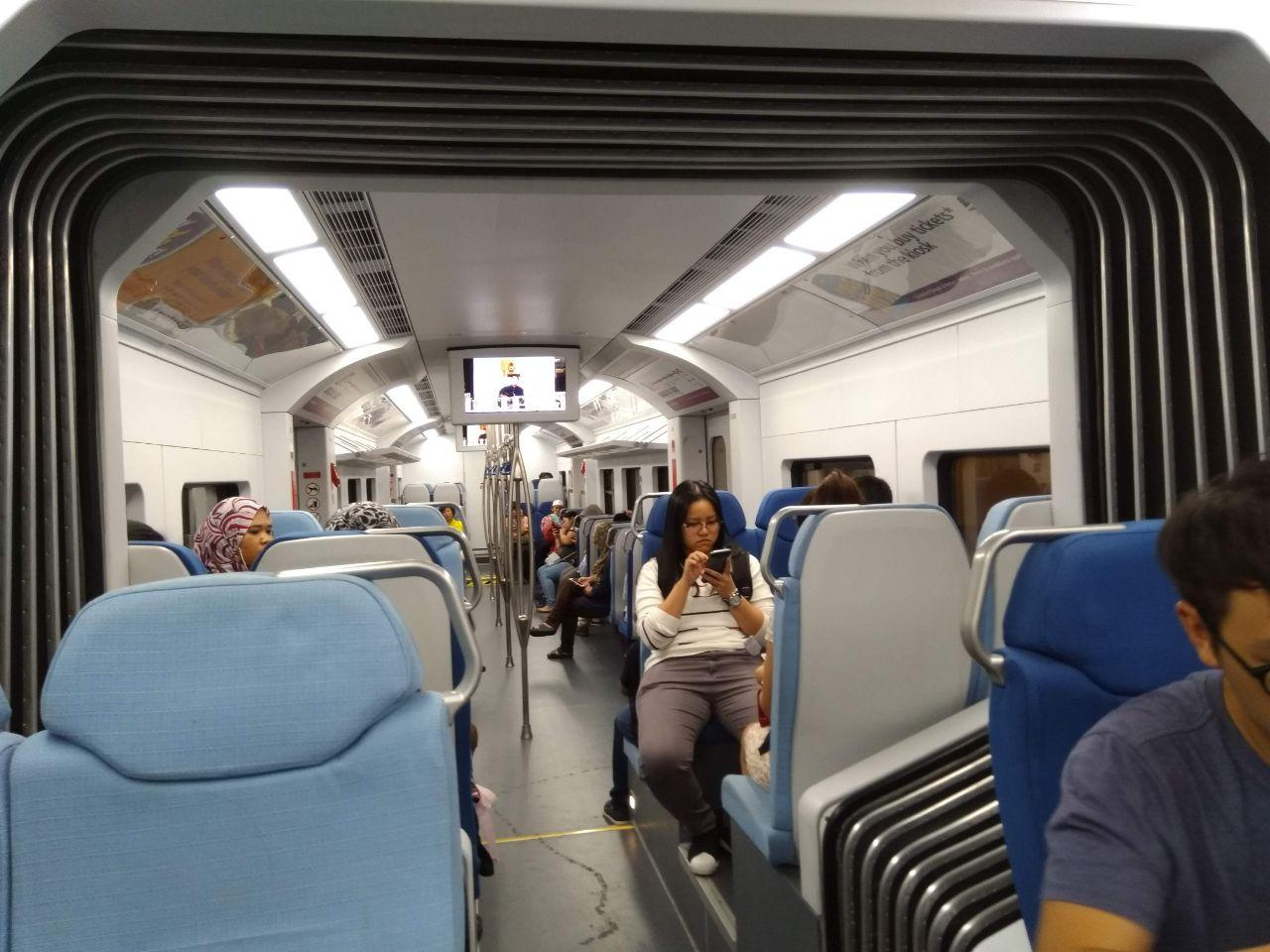
The wide gangway between coaches of the CRRC Changchun ERL Equator EMU used from KLIA Transit.

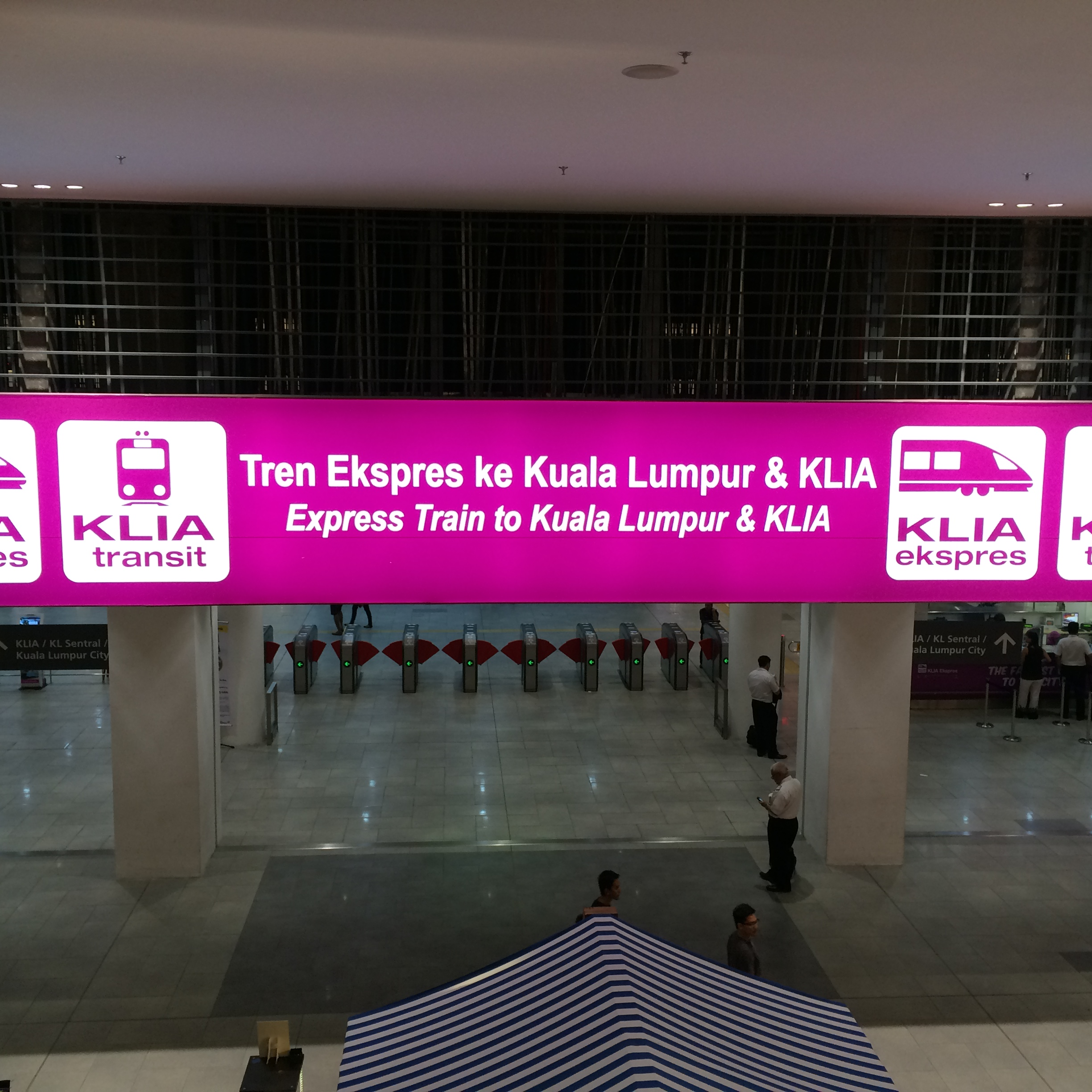
klia2 ERL station entrance at klia2

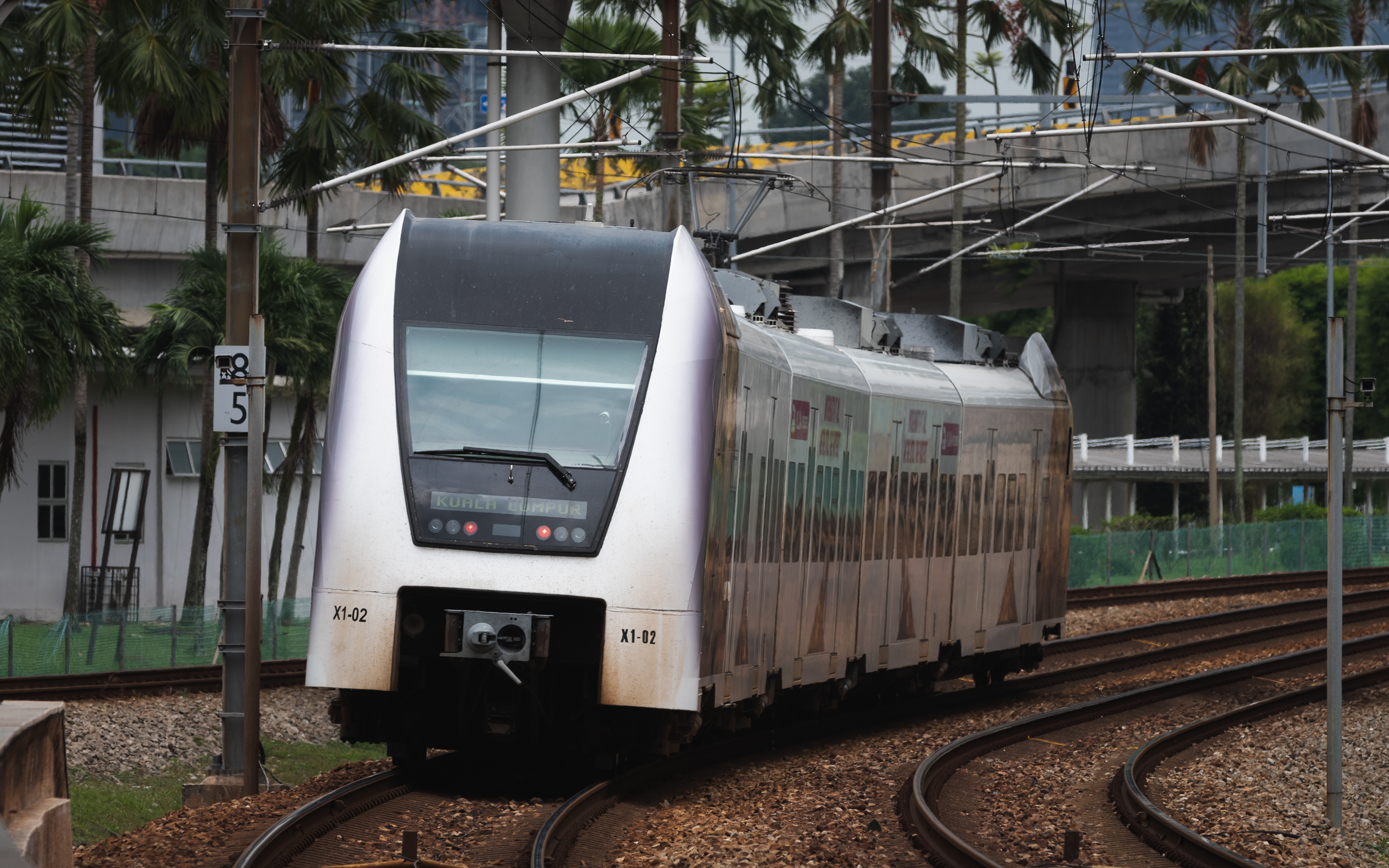
KLIA Exspres Siemens ET425M EMU Train at Bandar Tasik Selatan Station

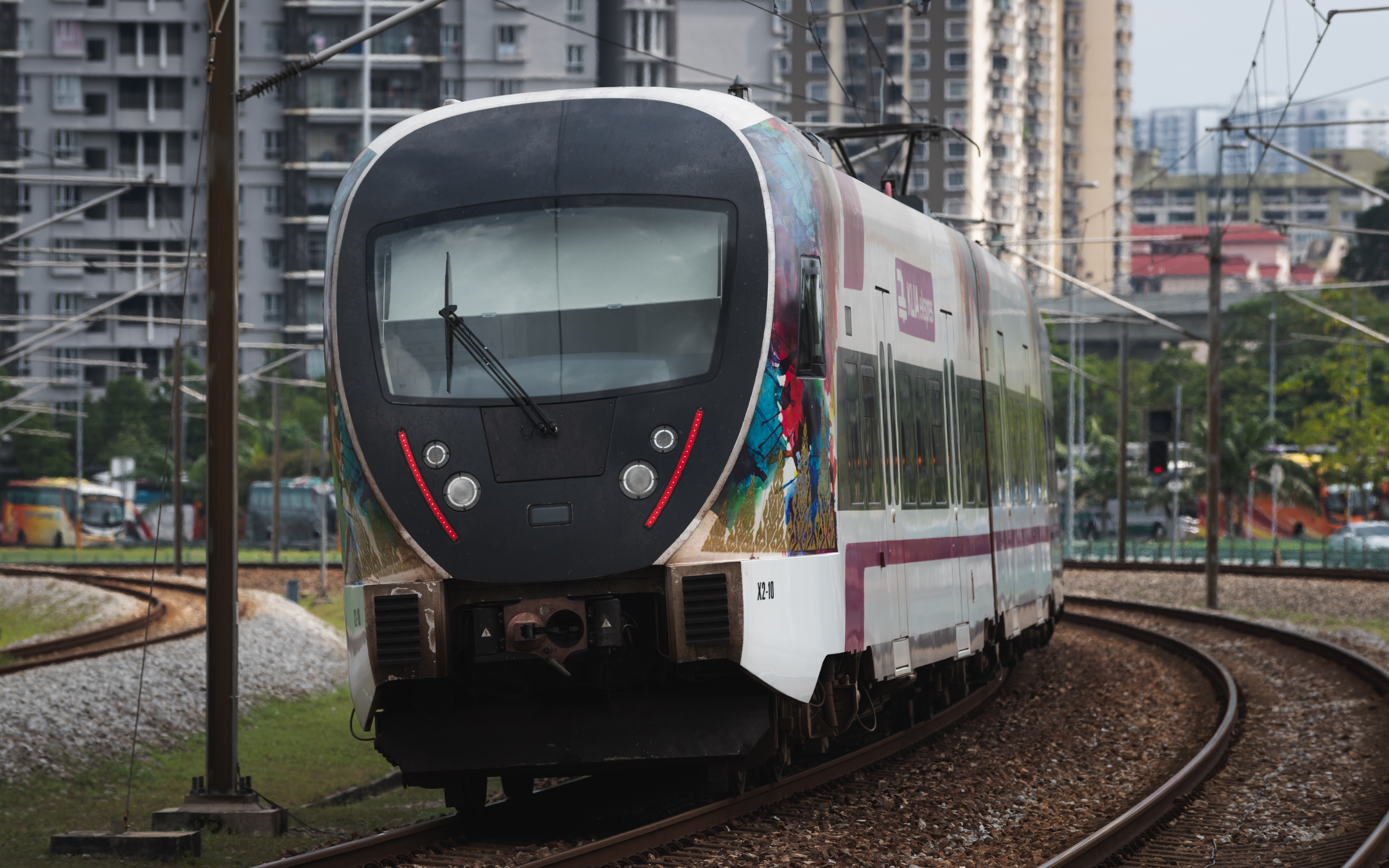
KLIA Exspres CRRC Changchun Equator EMU Train at Bandar Tasik Selatan Station

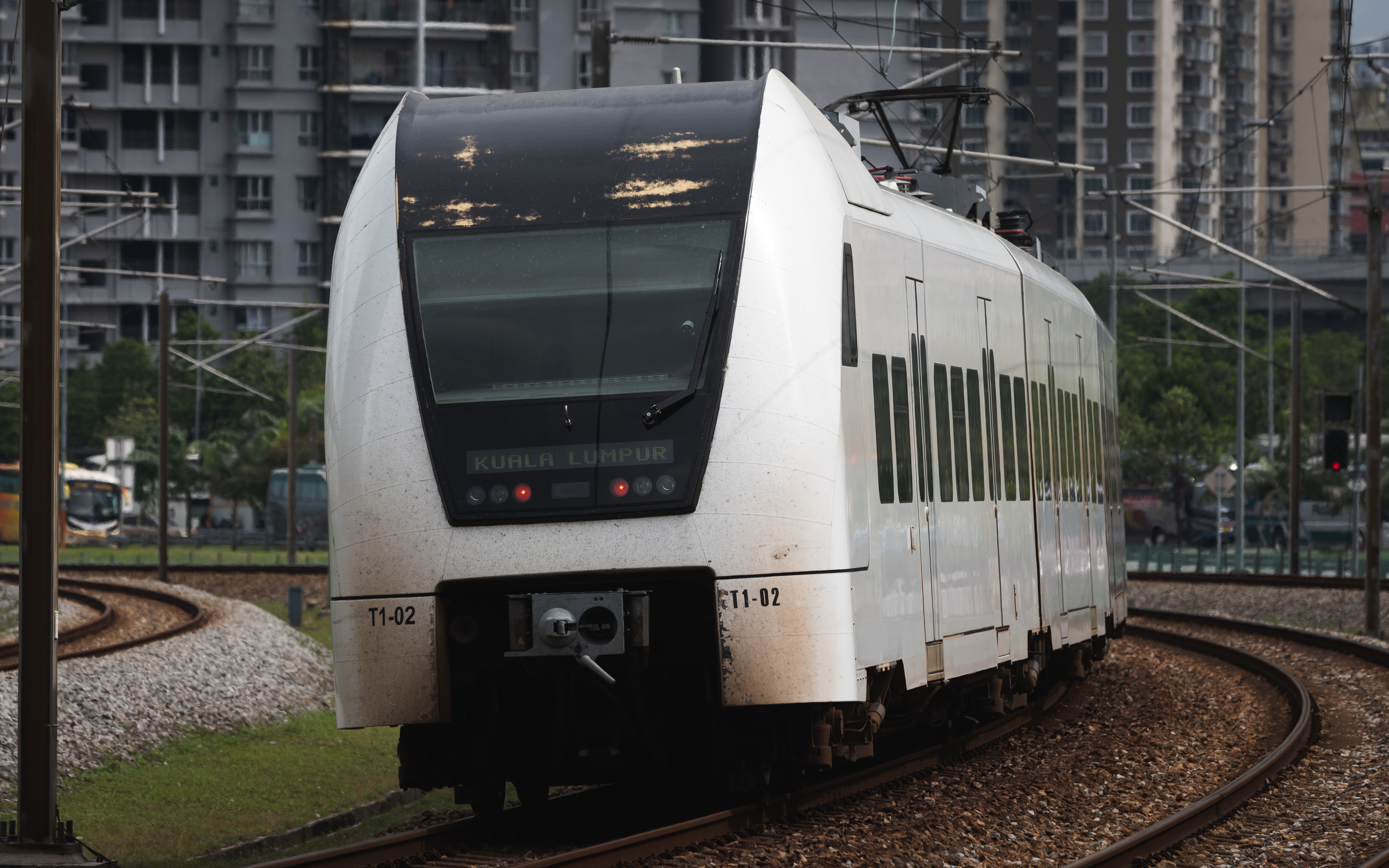
KLIA Transit Desiro ET 425 M EMU Train at Bandar Tasik Selatan Station

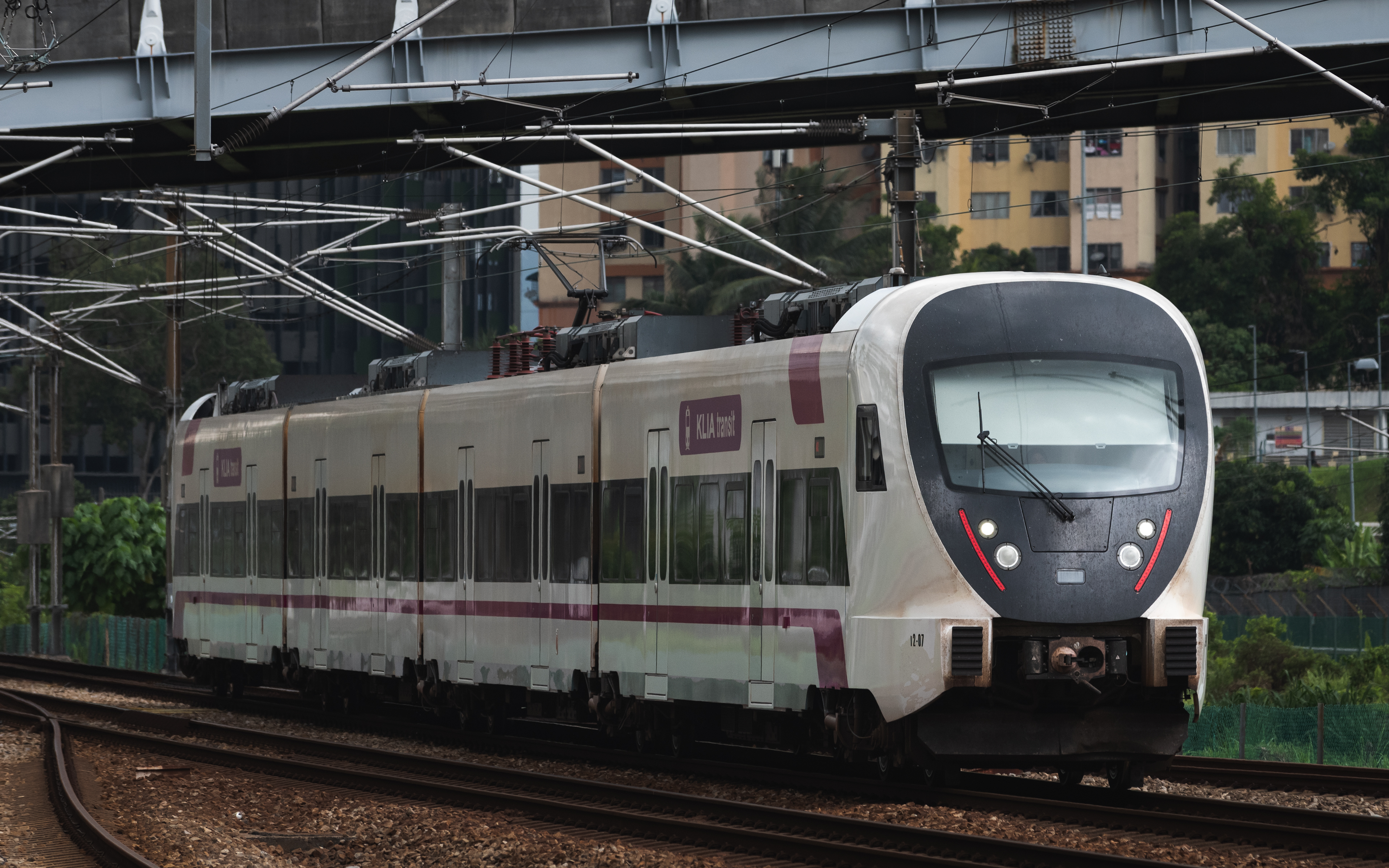
KLIA Transit Equater EMU Train at Bandar Tasik Selatan Station
