= Cityliner =

Cityliner or CityLiner may refer to:

- Cityliner (train), a limited express train service in Japan
- Cityliner (bus), the brand name for local buses in Malaysia operated by Konsortium Transnasional
- Alitalia CityLiner, a short-haul airline in Italy, a subsidiary of Alitalia
- Neoplan Cityliner, the name of several models of coach manufactured by German company Neoplan
- Cityliner, a model of coach manufactured by American company FitzJohn

== See also ==
- City Line (disambiguation)
