= City Line =

City line is an alternative name for City limits. It may also refer to:

- CityLine, a Canadian television program
- The neighborhood of City Line, Brooklyn in New York, USA
- Cityline (ISP), a Russian Internet provider
- City Line (Jerusalem), a boundary between Israel and Jordan from 1948 to 1967

== In rail transport ==
- The City Line (Merseyrail), a commuter rail route in Merseyside, England
- The Cardiff City Line, a commuter rail route in Cardiff, Wales
- The Cross-City Line, a suburban railway line in the West Midlands conurbation, England
- The City Branch of the London Underground's Northern line
- The London Underground's Hammersmith & City line
- The London Underground's Waterloo & City line
- The Northern City Line (formerly the Great Northern and City Line), a National Rail line in London, England
- The Stockholm City Line, a railway tunnel beneath central Stockholm, Sweden
- Tranz Metro, a former rail operator in Wellington, New Zealand which was formerly known as Cityline

== In road transport ==
- City Avenue or City Line Avenue, a highway in Philadelphia, USA
  - City Line Avenue Bridge, a historic bridge carrying City Line Avenue
- City Line, a bus rapid transit (BRT) line in Spokane, Washington, operated by Spokane Transit Authority
- An obsolete trading name used by the Bristol Omnibus Company and later First Bristol in Bristol, England
- An obsolete trading name used by the Oxford Bus Company in Oxford, England

== In water and air transport ==
- The Bristol City Line, a shipping line based in Bristol, England that traded from 1704 to 1974.
- CityLine Hungary, a Hungarian charter airline
- Lufthansa CityLine, a German regional airline

== See also ==
- Cityliner (disambiguation)
