= Transport in Greater Kuala Lumpur =

Public transport in Malaysia

Transport in Greater Kuala Lumpur includes a road network, a railway network, airports, and other modes of public transport. Greater Kuala Lumpur is conterminous with the Klang Valley, an urban conglomeration consisting of the city of Kuala Lumpur, as well as surrounding towns and cities in the state of Selangor. The Klang Valley has Malaysia's largest airport, the Kuala Lumpur International Airport (KLIA), as well as the country's largest intermodal transport hub and railway station, Kuala Lumpur Sentral (KL Sentral).

There are multiple modes of public transport, including buses, rail, taxis, and motor-taxis, serving the region. However Kuala Lumpur, with a population of 1.79 million in the city and six million in its metropolitan area, is experiencing the effects and challenges of rapid urbanisation and urban planning issues. To resolve these issues, the Kuala Lumpur City Hall (DBKL) has plans to initiate programmes that would improve the public transportation system and increase its sustainability and decrease its environmental impact in the Klang Valley. The Kuala Lumpur Structure Plan 2020, in particular, intends to address the unprecedented growth and changes in Kuala Lumpur's urban transportation landscape.

== History of public transport in Kuala Lumpur ==
In the 19th century and early 20th century, most Kuala Lumpur citizens and tin miners used rickshaws, elephants, sampans, and bull- or horse-drawn carriages as basic public transportation (as in transport by means not owned by persons being transported).

Rail transit in Kuala Lumpur and Selangor began in 1886 when a railway line from Kuala Lumpur to Bukit Kuda (just outside Klang) was opened. The line remains operational to this day as the Tanjung Malim-Port Klang Line.

From the 1960s to the 1990s, the Mini-Bus Service or Bas Mini was popular.

Kuala Lumpur's (and by extension, Malaysia's) first metro line, the STAR LRT (now known as LRT Ampang Line), opened in December 1996.

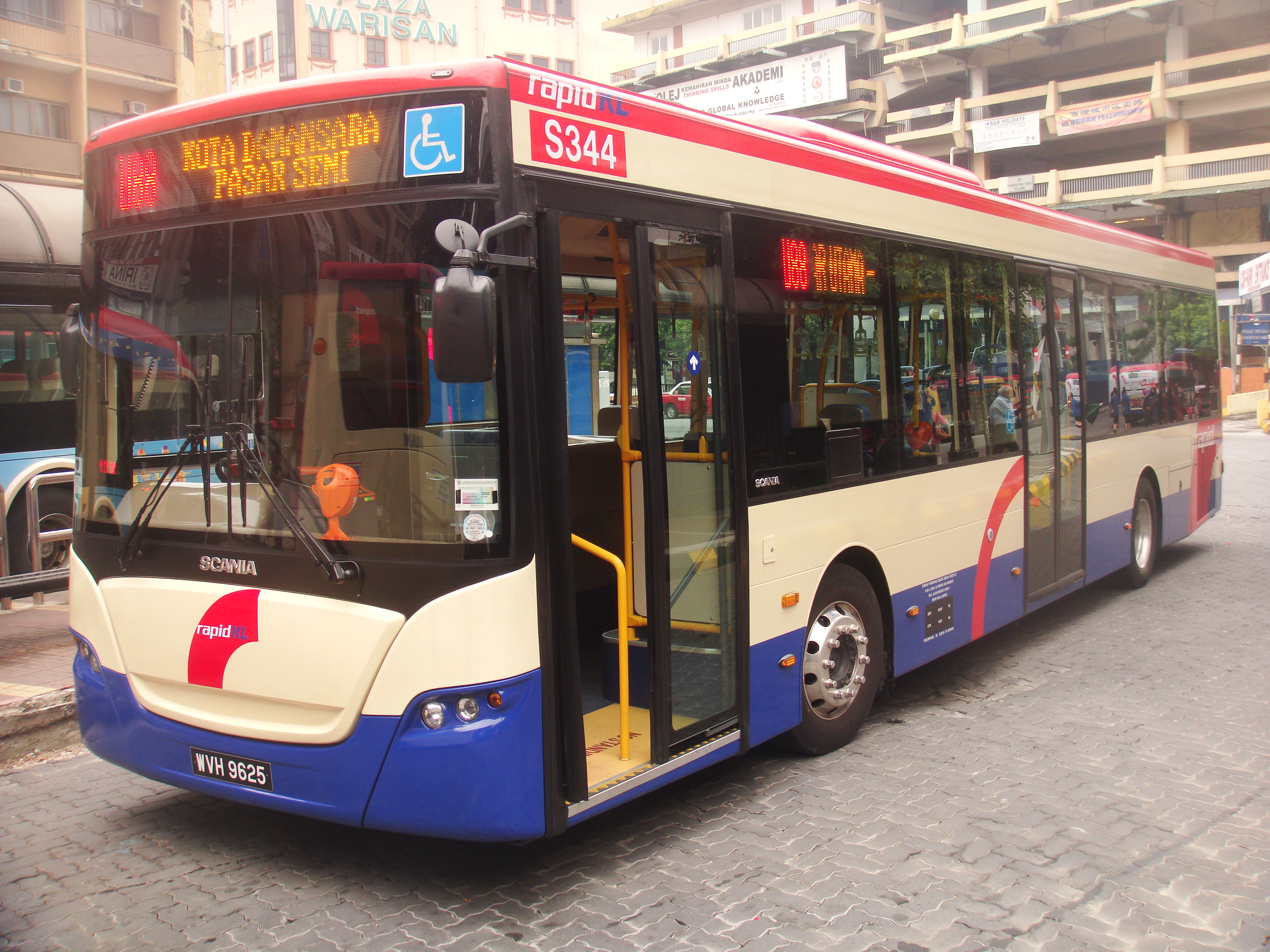
Scania K270UB 4x2 operated by Rapid KL

== Regulation ==
The public transport system is regulated by various authorities, including the Commercial Vehicle Licensing Board (CVLB) of the Ministry of Entrepreneur and Co-operative Development, the Ministry of Transport and local governments such as the Kuala Lumpur City Hall (DBKL) and the other city and municipal councils.

There is no single body that regulates the whole sector.

The Integration and Restructuring of the Public Transport System in the Klang Valley (Inspak) steering committee, established in July 2003, is tasked with encouraging greater use of public transportation to reduce traffic congestion and initiate the establishment of the Klang Valley Urban Transport Authority as the regulatory authority for public transportation in the Klang Valley. Little has been said about the establishment of this authority ever since.

Rapid KL was established in 2004 by the Ministry of Finance to provide an integrated public transport system in the Klang Valley incorporating rail and bus services as part of Inspak. It holds quasi-regulatory powers in the sense that unlike other bus operators, it has much greater freedom to set its routes. Furthermore, its fare structure differs from that set by the CVLB.

By 2007, passengers have access to Touch 'n Go ticketing system on Rapid KL systems, KL Monorail, and KTM Komuter.

== Cycling ==
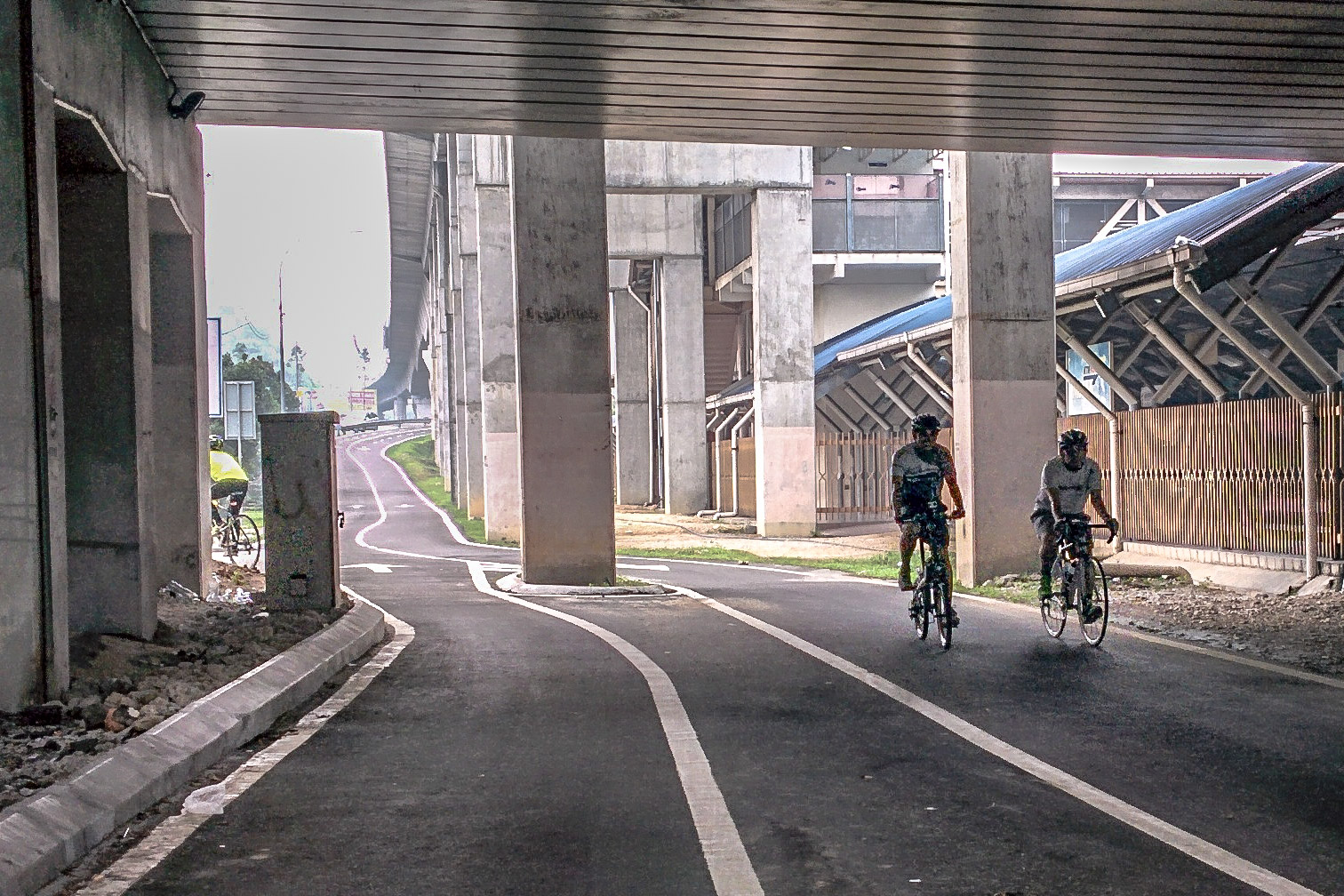
Southwest Dedicated Bicycle Highway heading from Jalan Klang Lama. On the right side is the building of Mid Valley Komuter station.

Cycling in Kuala Lumpur (Malay: Menunggang basikal di bandaraya Kuala Lumpur) refers to the bicycle uses in Kuala Lumpur, Malaysia for touring, recreational, work and transportation purpose. It was first appeared on 1938 when there is a first road cycling race that has been introduced in Kuala Lumpur. The bicycle in Kuala Lumpur later became one of the preferred transportation methods for students and mid-class citizens. As Kuala Lumpur begin its rapid urbanization progress since 1960s, the usage of bicycle start to decline as people shifting their transportation method to driving. In recent years however, the roads of the city have seen an increased presence of cyclists, whereas the importance of doing exercise has become more recognized. To match this positive change, and to reduce air pollution, the city urgently needs the introduction of more pavements and bicycle lanes, ideally by leveraging on the vast area that is currently taken up by motorways. Given that Kuala Lumpur lacks many bicycle-friendly routes suitable for cyclists in the city, however, proposals of a bicycle infrastructure of urban bicycling program were drafted, mainly under the Kuala Lumpur Structure Plan 2020 and cycling activism by Cycling Kuala Lumpur in order to encourage more citizens of Kuala Lumpur to cycle in the urban area.

== Rail ==
=== Klang Valley Integrated Transit System ===
The Klang Valley Integrated Transit System currently consists of four light rapid transit (LRT) lines, two commuter rail lines, one monorail line, one bus rapid transit line, two mass rapid transit (MRT) lines and three airport rail links, two to the Kuala Lumpur International Airport (KLIA) and one to the Sultan Abdul Aziz Shah Airport (Subang Airport). The LRT lines connect the city centre with Kuala Lumpur's satellite cities and towns such as Petaling Jaya, Subang Jaya, Gombak, Puchong, Shah Alam and Klang. The MRT and commuter rail lines link the city centre with other major towns and cities outside the city such as Shah Alam, Petaling Jaya, Klang, Rawang, Kepong, Kajang, Sungai Buloh, Putrajaya and others. The monorail serves various locations within the city centre. Several interchanging stations integrate these rail services. Several railway stations are also served by the intercity KTM ETS service, which connects the Klang Valley with other states and regions in Peninsular Malaysia.

Commuter rail service

1 Batu Caves–Pulau Sebang Line
Between Batu Caves and Pulau Sebang/Tampin
27 stations over 135.6 km, operated by Keretapi Tanah Melayu (KTM)
2 Tanjung Malim–Port Klang Line
Between Tanjung Malim and Port Klang
34 stations over 127.5 km, operated by Keretapi Tanah Melayu (KTM)

Mass Rapid Transit (MRT) service

9 Kajang Line
Between Kwasa Damansara and Kajang
29 stations + 3 provisional over 46 km, owned by MRT Corp and operated by Rapid Rail

12 Putrajaya Line
Between Kwasa Damansara and Putrajaya Sentral
36 stations + 5 provisional over 57.7 km, owned by MRT Corp and operated by Rapid Rail

13 Circle Line
(Future)
A loop-line between Bukit Kiara Selatan and UM
Currently in the land acquisition process, will consist of 30 stations + 3 provisional over 50.8 km, owned by MRT Corp

Light Rapid Transit (LRT) service

3 Ampang Line
Between Sentul Timur and Ampang
18 stations over 15 km, owned by Prasarana Malaysia and operated by Rapid Rail

4 Sri Petaling Line
Between Sentul Timur and Putra Heights
29 stations + 2 provisional over 37.6 km, owned by Prasarana Malaysia and operated by Rapid Rail

5 Kelana Jaya Line
Between Gombak and Putra Heights
37 stations over 46.4 km, owned by Prasarana Malaysia and operated by Rapid Rail

11 Shah Alam Line
Between Bandar Utama and Johan Setia
20 + 5 provisional over 37.8 km, owned by Prasarana Malaysia and operated by Rapid Rail

Monorail service

8 KL Monorail
Between KL Sentral and Titiwangsa
11 stations over 8.6 km, owned by Prasarana Malaysia and operated by Rapid Rail

Bus Rapid Transit (BRT) service

B1 BRT Sunway Line
Between Sunway-Setia Jaya and USJ 7
7 stations over 5.6 km, owned by Prasarana Malaysia and operated by Rapid Bus

Airport rail link service

6 KLIA Ekspres
Non-stop between KL Sentral and KLIA T1 & KLIA T2
3 stations over 59.1 km, owned and operated by Express Rail Link (ERL)

7 KLIA Transit
Between KL Sentral and KLIA T1 & KLIA T2
6 stations over 59.1 km, owned and operated by Express Rail Link (ERL)

10 KL Sentral–Terminal Skypark Line
(Temporarily suspended since February 15, 2023, due to low ridership and high operational costs)
Limited express between KL Sentral and Terminal Skypark
3 stations over 24.5 km, operated by Keretapi Tanah Melayu (KTM)

==== Light Rapid Transit (LRT) ====
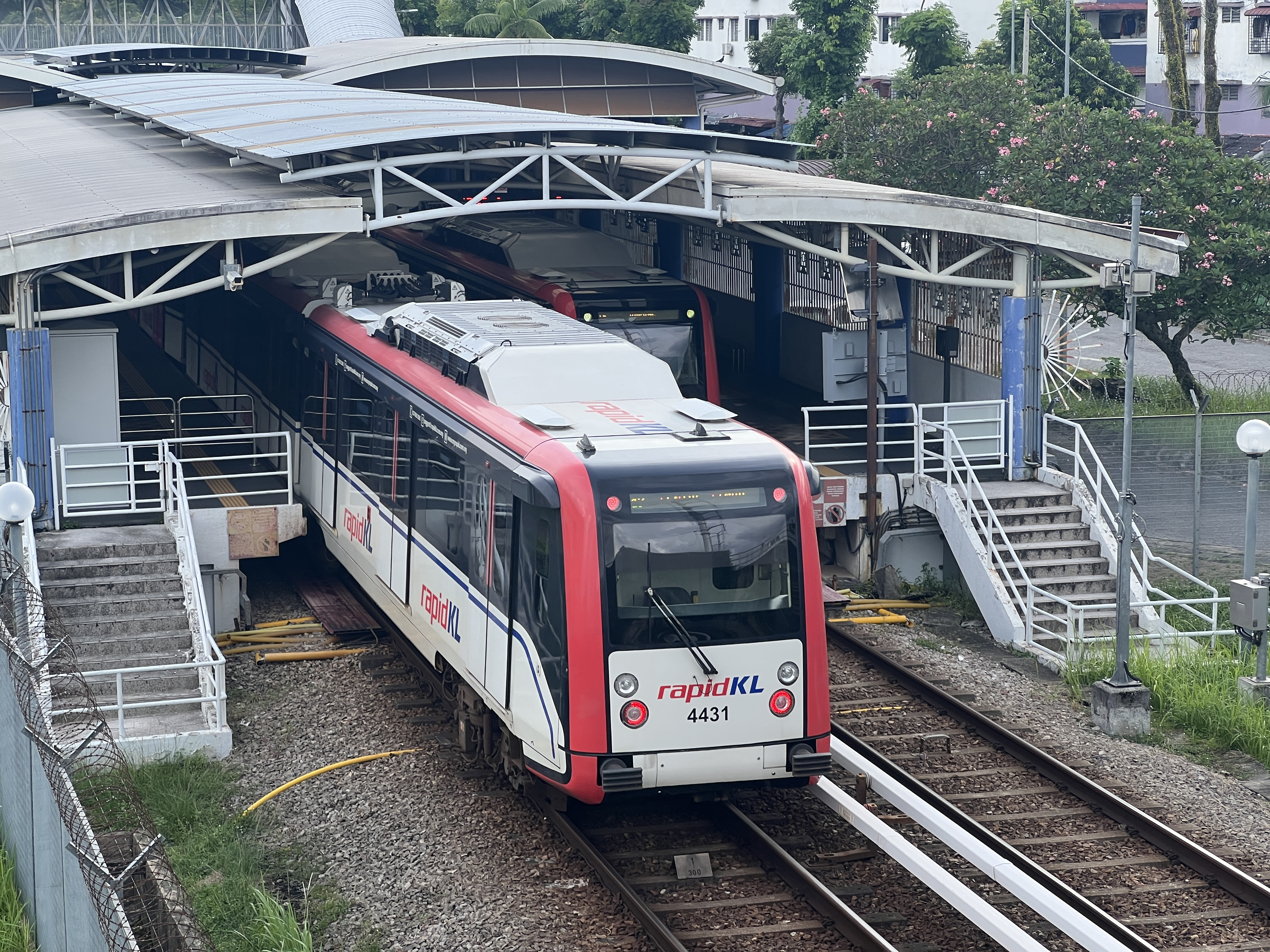
LRT Ampang Line CSR Zhuzhou LRV arriving at Cahaya station

There are three fully grade-separated light rapid transit (LRT) systems in the Klang Valley, the Kelana Jaya Line, LRT Ampang and Sri Petaling Lines, and the Shah Alam Line. The lines function as light metro services and are all operated by Rapid Rail as part of the Rapid KL system.

The Kelana Jaya Line links the city centre with the major towns and cities of Subang Jaya, Petaling Jaya and Gombak. To date, it carries over 250,000 passengers a day. At 46.4 km (28.8 mi) in length, the Kelana Jaya Line is the third-longest fully automated driverless metro system in Malaysia. Between Pasar Seni and Damai, the line runs underground, serving five stations.

The Ampang Line and Sri Petaling Line function as a single system. Both lines share a common section between their terminus Sentul Timur, and Chan Sow Lin. After Chan Sow Lin, the lines split and travel to their respective southern termini. The Sri Petaling Line extends from the city centre towards the south of Kuala Lumpur and through Puchong, before meeting the Kelana Jaya Line at their common terminus station, Putra Heights. The Ampang Line serves the eastern part of Kuala Lumpur as well as Ampang. Both lines have a combined length of 45.1 km (28.0 mi). These two lines carry over 200,000 per day on weekdays and an average of 120,000 per day on weekends. Unlike the other rapid transit lines, the Ampang and Sri Petaling lines run completely above ground.

The Shah Alam Line is the third LRT system and the fourth LRT line, and the latest LRT line introduced to the Klang Valley. Having a total length of 37.8 km (23.5 mi), it connects the township of Bandar Utama and western Petaling Jaya with Klang, serving the city of Shah Alam along the way. The line is the first rapid transit line in the Klang Valley Integrated Transit System to not be within the borders of Kuala Lumpur proper. However, the line is connected to the system through interchange stations with the Kelana Jaya Line and the Kajang Line, allowing commuters from Kuala Lumpur to travel as far as Shah Alam and Klang on the western side of Selangor.

All LRT lines run on standard-gauge tracks.

==== Mass Rapid Transit (MRT) ====
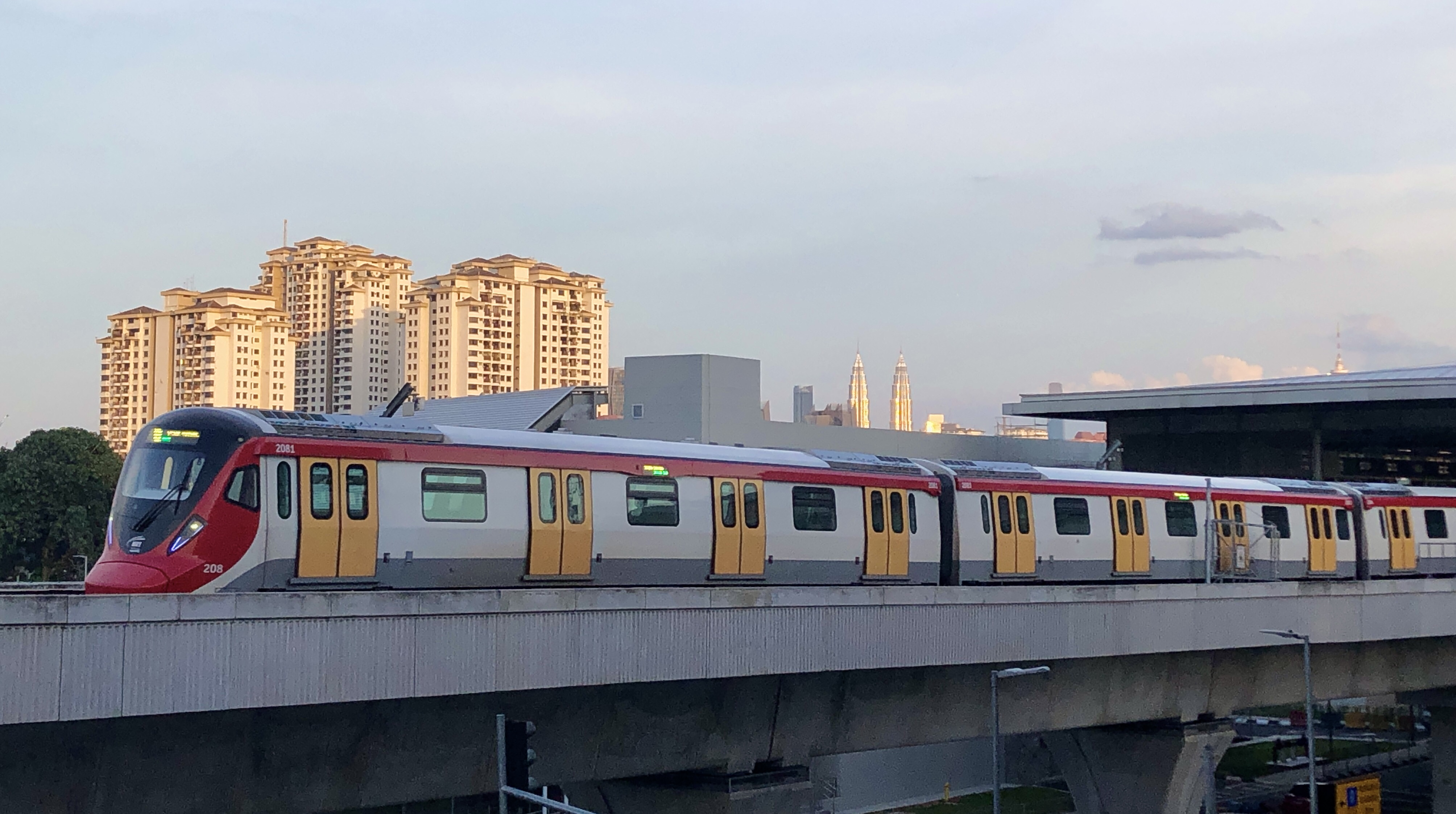
Hyundai Rotem EMU rolling stock on the MRT Putrajaya Line

The Klang Valley currently has two mass rapid transit (MRT) lines, the Kajang Line and Putrajaya Line. The Kajang Line provides high-capacity metro services between the city and the outer parts of the Klang Valley. The Kajang Line runs from Kwasa Damansara to Kajang stations, running through the city centre, as well as the areas of Damansara, Cheras and Kajang. The line is 47 km (29 mi) long with a total of 29 stations, and is currently the second-longest fully-automated driverless metro system in Malaysia.

The second MRT line, the Putrajaya Line runs from Kwasa Damansara (where it shares a common terminus with the Kajang Line with a stacked island platform) to Putrajaya Sentral. The line is 57.7 km (35.9 mi) long with a total of 36 stations. The line serves Sungai Buloh and northern Kuala Lumpur (Kepong), passing through the city centre, and serving southern Kuala Lumpur, Seri Kembangan and Cyberjaya before terminating at Putrajaya. It is also the second rail link from Kuala Lumpur to Putrajaya, the country's administrative capital, after the Express Rail Link lines. It is currently the longest fully-automated driverless metro system in Malaysia.

Both lines are owned by MRT Corp and operated by Rapid Rail, and functions as part of the Rapid KL system.

A third MRT line, the Circle Line, has been approved and would form a loop line of the integrated transit system in the Klang Valley region. It is expected to stretch from Bukit Kiara to the University of Malaya, and will also include densely populated areas outside of the city centre.

All MRT lines run on standard-gauge tracks.

==== Commuter rail ====
Commuter rail in the Klang Valley is mainly operated by Keretapi Tanah Melayu (KTM). It operates three lines in the Klang Valley, namely the Batu Caves–Pulau Sebang Line, Tanjung Malim–Port Klang Line and KL Sentral–Terminal Skypark Line. All three lines integrate at KL Sentral, the largest railway station and intermodal transportation hub in Malaysia, which is also served by other transit lines. The commuter lines provide long-distance rail transport to the outer fringes of the Klang Valley, including Batu Caves, Shah Alam, Petaling Jaya, Subang Jaya, Kajang and Klang in Selangor. The Batu Caves-Pulau Sebang Line travels south as far as Pulau Sebang in Malacca, while the Tanjung Malim-Port Klang Line extends to Tanjung Malim in Perak. The KL Sentral-Terminal Skypark Line functions as an airport rail link from the city centre to the Sultan Abdul Aziz Shah Airport (Subang Airport) in Subang.

The KTM Komuter system is the only urban rail system in the Klang Valley which runs on metre-gauge tracks. The KTM Komuter shares the same tracks with the KTM ETS, providing interchanges with the inter-city rail service.

==== Airport Rail Links (Express Rail Link) ====
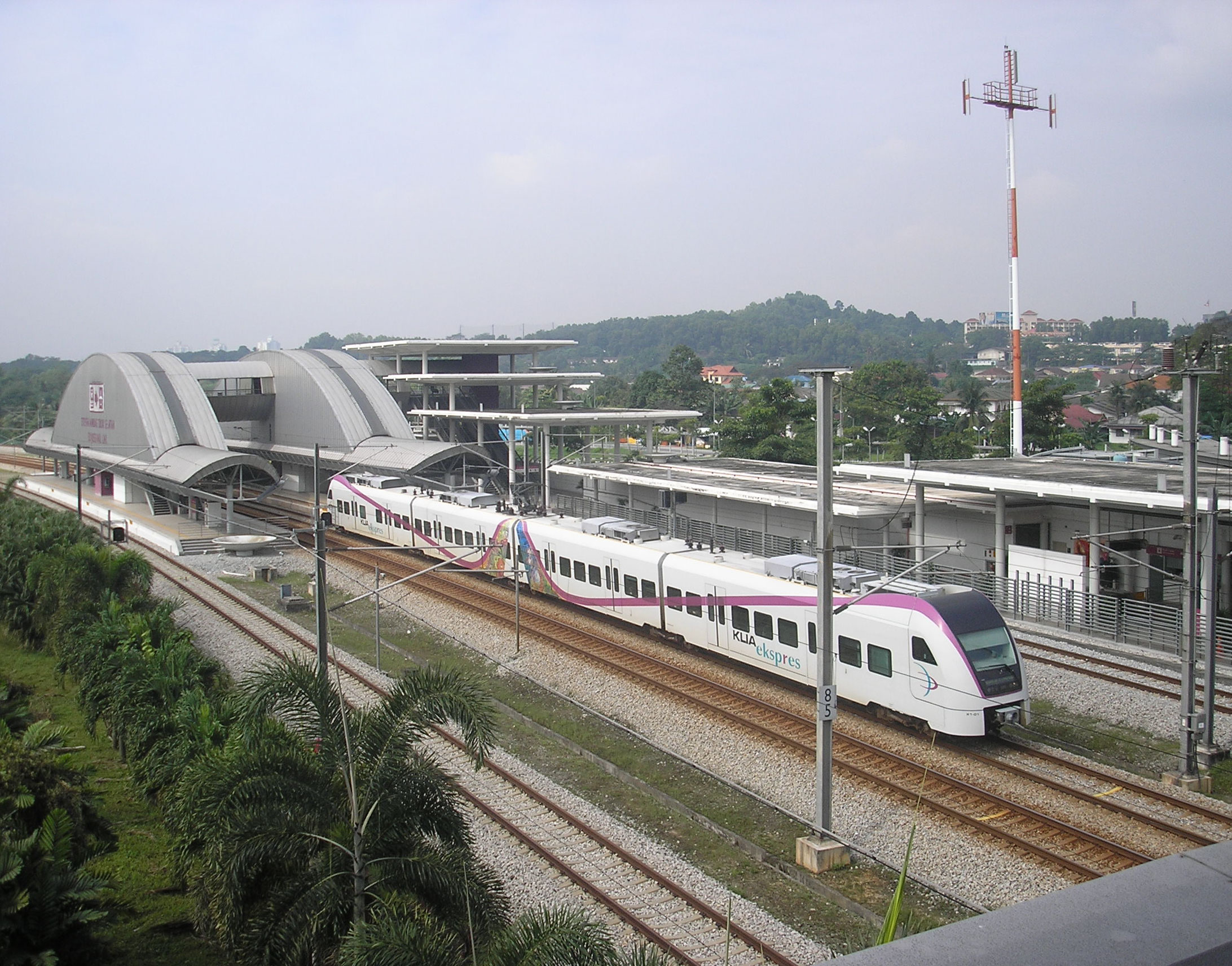
A KLIA Ekspres Siemens Desiro leaving Bandar Tasik Selatan Station. KLIA Express and KLIA Transit share the same track.

Express airport rail link services are provided by both the KL Sentral-Terminal Skypark Line to the Subang Airport, as well as the KLIA Ekspres line operated by Express Rail Link (ERL) to the Kuala Lumpur International Airport (KLIA). The KLIA Ekspress provides non-stop service between KL Sentral and KLIA, without stopping in any of the stations in between. The journey only takes 28 minutes with a maximum speed of 160 km/h (99 mph). The trains run on 15-minute intervals during peak hours and 20-minute intervals during off-peak hours.

The KLIA Transit line shares the same tracks as the KLIA Ekspres. Also operated by ERL, KLIA Transit stops at all stations between KL Sentral and KLIA, providing a commuter rail service apart from a rail link from the city centre to the airport.

The KL Sentral-Terminal Skypark Line, KLIA Transit Line, and KLIA Ekspres Line share a common terminus at KL Sentral station, allowing passengers to transfer between the airports using the rail lines.

While the KTM Komuter system uses metre-gauge tracks, the ERL system uses standard-gauge tracks.

==== Monorail ====
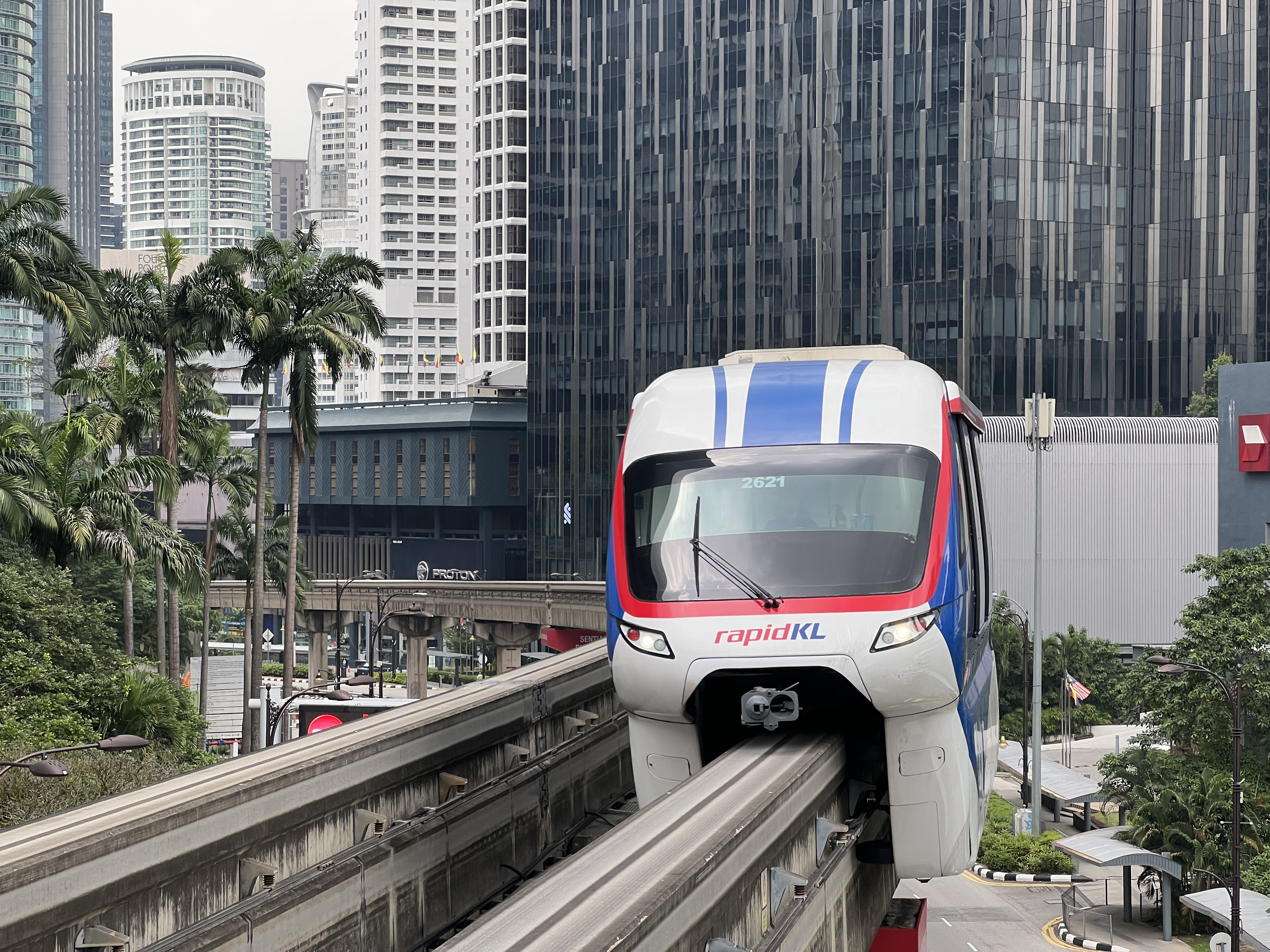
KL Monorail Scomi RSV Arriving Raja Chulan Station MR7

Previously operated by KL Infrastructure Group, the monorail service in Kuala Lumpur serves as a people mover system within the city. It connects the KL Sentral transport hub with the Golden Triangle area of Kuala Lumpur, and onward towards Titiwangsa, where it meets the Ampang, Sri Petaling and Putrajaya lines. The system spans over 8.6 km (5.3 mi), with 11 elevated stations, and has 50,000 daily passengers. Since November 2007, the monorail service has been taken over by Prasarana Malaysia and merged into the Rapid KL network.

=== Inter-city rail ===
==== KTM Electric Train Service (ETS) ====
The main Inter-city rail service in Malaysia is provided by Keretapi Tanah Melayu (KTM), which operates the KTM ETS service. KTM ETS operates along the KTM West Coast Line, between Padang Besar in Perlis and JB Sentral in Johor. All KTM ETS services originate or run through KL Sentral and connect the city with all the states along the West Coast of Peninsular Malaysia.

At Padang Besar, the West Coast line connects with the Thai railway network operated by the State Railway of Thailand. At Gemas, the railway line is connected with the KTM East Coast Line. The West Coast line terminates at the Woodlands Train Checkpoint in Singapore. The East Coast line, as well as the southern portion of the West Coast line (between Gemas and the Woodlands Train Checkpoint), is served by KTM Intercity, another inter-city rail service also operated by KTM, providing rail transport to the East Coast states and Johor, and crossing the international border into Singapore.

The railway lines are built on the metre gauge. The West Coast line between Padang Besar and JB Sentral is double-tracked and electrified, while the entire East Coast line as well as the short portion between JB Sentral and the Woodlands Train Checkpoint on the West Coast line is single-tracked and not electrified, allowing only diesel hauled trains to run on them.

Double tracking and electrification of the West Coast Line, which was carried out in portions, was finally completed in 2025 with the latest completion of works on the southern portion of the line between Gemas and Johor Bahru, allowing full deployment of KTM ETS services throughout the west coast of Peninsular Malaysia.

== Buses ==
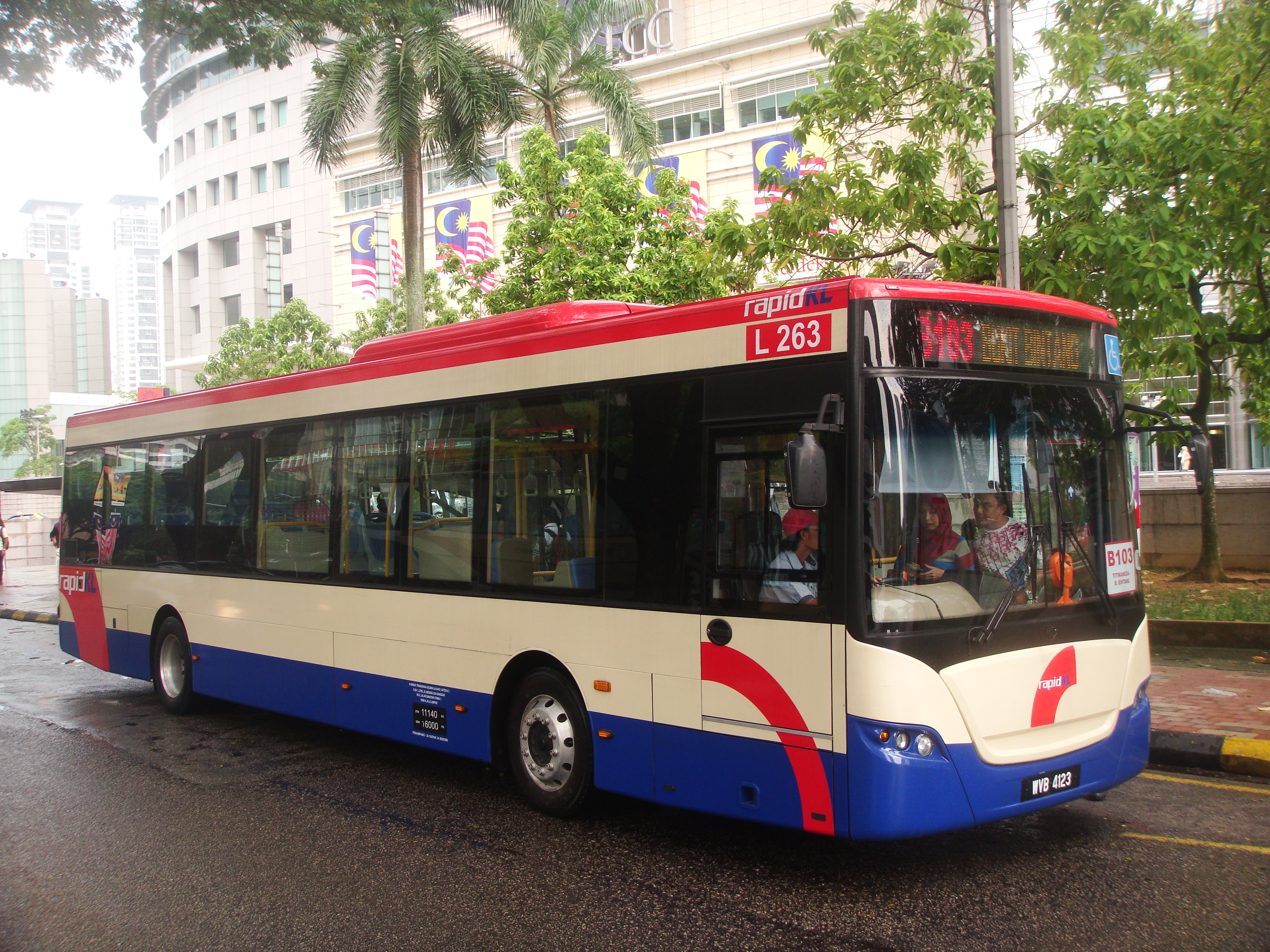
Rapid KL King Long XMQ6121G bus

The Kuala Lumpur Mini Bus service is one of the oldest bus services in Malaysia and commenced operation in 1975. The Klang Valley's bus service was rather poor compared to other cities around the world before the bus network revamp, resulting in only 16% of the total population in Klang Valley using public transport.

On 1 December 2015, the Land Public Transport Agency (formerly SPAD) under the Ministry of Transport revamped the bus network. Through this exercise, all bus routes were reorganised into 8 smaller corridors based on the main trunk roads connecting Kuala Lumpur's city center. In total, 8 stage bus corridors were introduced, namely the Ampang Corridor, Cheras Corridor, Sungai Besi Corridor, Klang Lama Corridor, Lebuhraya Persekutuan Corridor, Damansara Corridor, Jalan Ipoh Corridor, and Jalan Pahang Corridor were revamped under the Klang Valley region.

Rapid Bus is the largest single operator of the bus network in Malaysia. Bus fare varies with bus operator, where Rapid Bus uses a cashless system and other operators uses cash system. Within the city centre, Rapid Bus also operates eight free GoKL City Bus lines.

On 18 June 2020, Rapid Bus released new features on real time locations of bus in Google Maps, via collaboration with Google Transit. Almost 170 Rapid KL's bus routes are covered with this real time feature. Rapid Bus also had been expanded the application to MRT feeder bus service, Rapid Penang, and Rapid Kuantan by 2022, passengers can check the real time location via the kiosk website or the PULSE application.

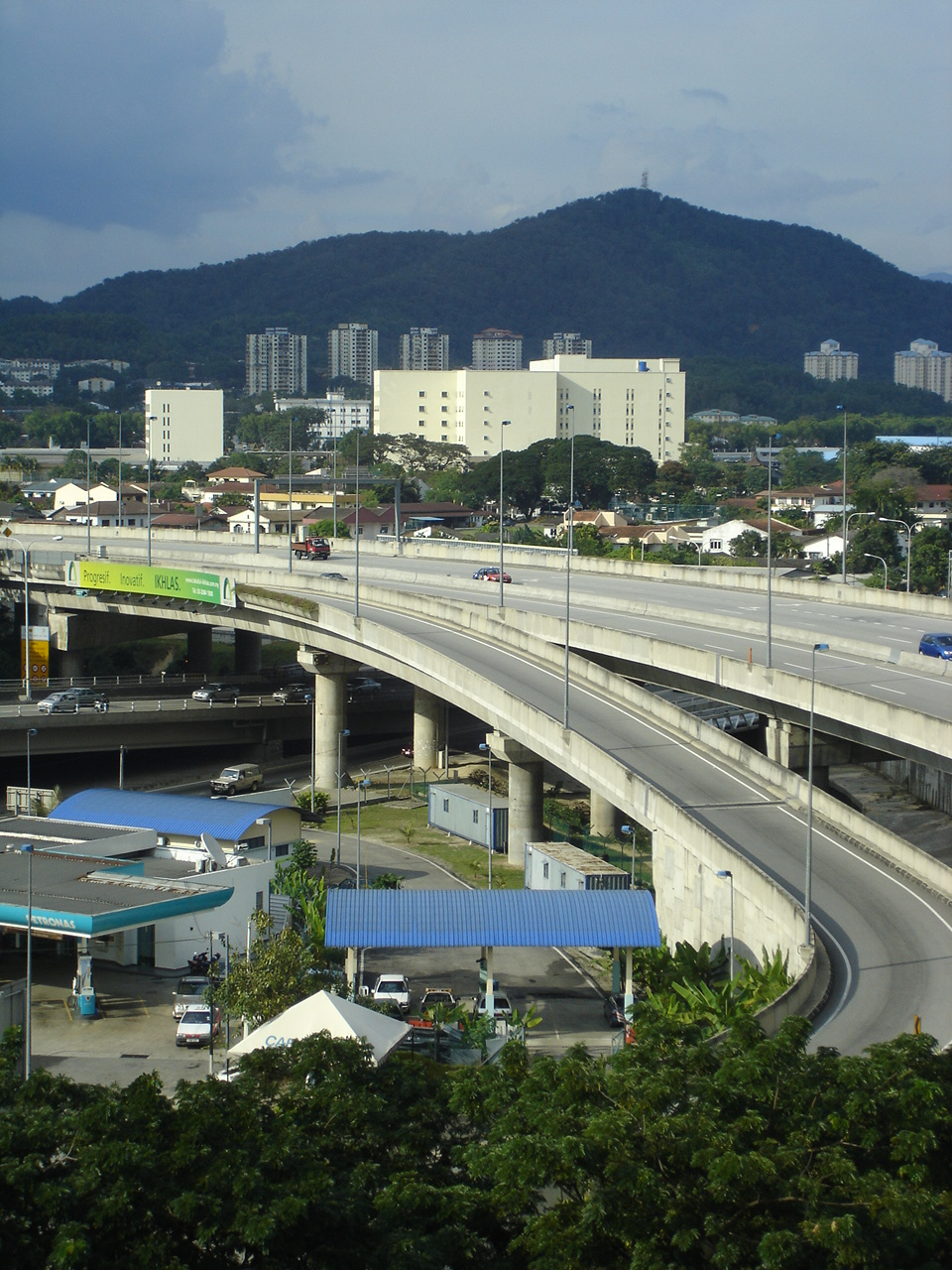
The Ampang–Kuala Lumpur Elevated Highway at the eastern fringes of the city

Several bus operators operate in Kuala Lumpur, linking the city centre with the suburbs of the Klang Valley. The main operator is Prasarana's subsidiaries of Rapid Bus, who took over the operations of the two main bus operators, Intrakota and Cityliner.

Other operators include MARA Liner, Selangor Omnibus, Causeway Link and Wawasan Sutera.

=== Klang Valley ===
Buses in Klang Valley are run by many transport operators and have many uses. There are nine stage bus operators within the Klang Valley, including Kuala Lumpur, which together operate about 3,200 stage buses.

==== Local buses ====
Local buses (not to be confused with Rapid KL's Local Shuttle) or stage buses are run by the integrated network operator Rapid KL as well as privately owned MARA Liner, Causeway Link, Len Seng, Selangor Omnibus, Cityliner (KKBB), Wawasan Sutera, Nadi Putra, and KR Travel and Tours.

Metrobus and Rapid KL are the two main bus companies within the boundaries of Kuala Lumpur from 2006 to 2015. As there is no difference between public transport in Kuala Lumpur and public transport for the whole Klang Valley, most of the other bus companies other than Rapid KL and Metrobus are normally confined to Klang Valley areas that are outside the boundaries of Kuala Lumpur.

The largest operator, Rapid KL, operates more than 170 bus routes along with the LRT Ampang Line, LRT Sri Petaling Line, LRT Kelana Jaya Line, LRT Shah Alam Line, MRT Kajang Line, MRT Putrajaya Line, KL Monorail and BRT Sunway Line.

=== Bus stops ===
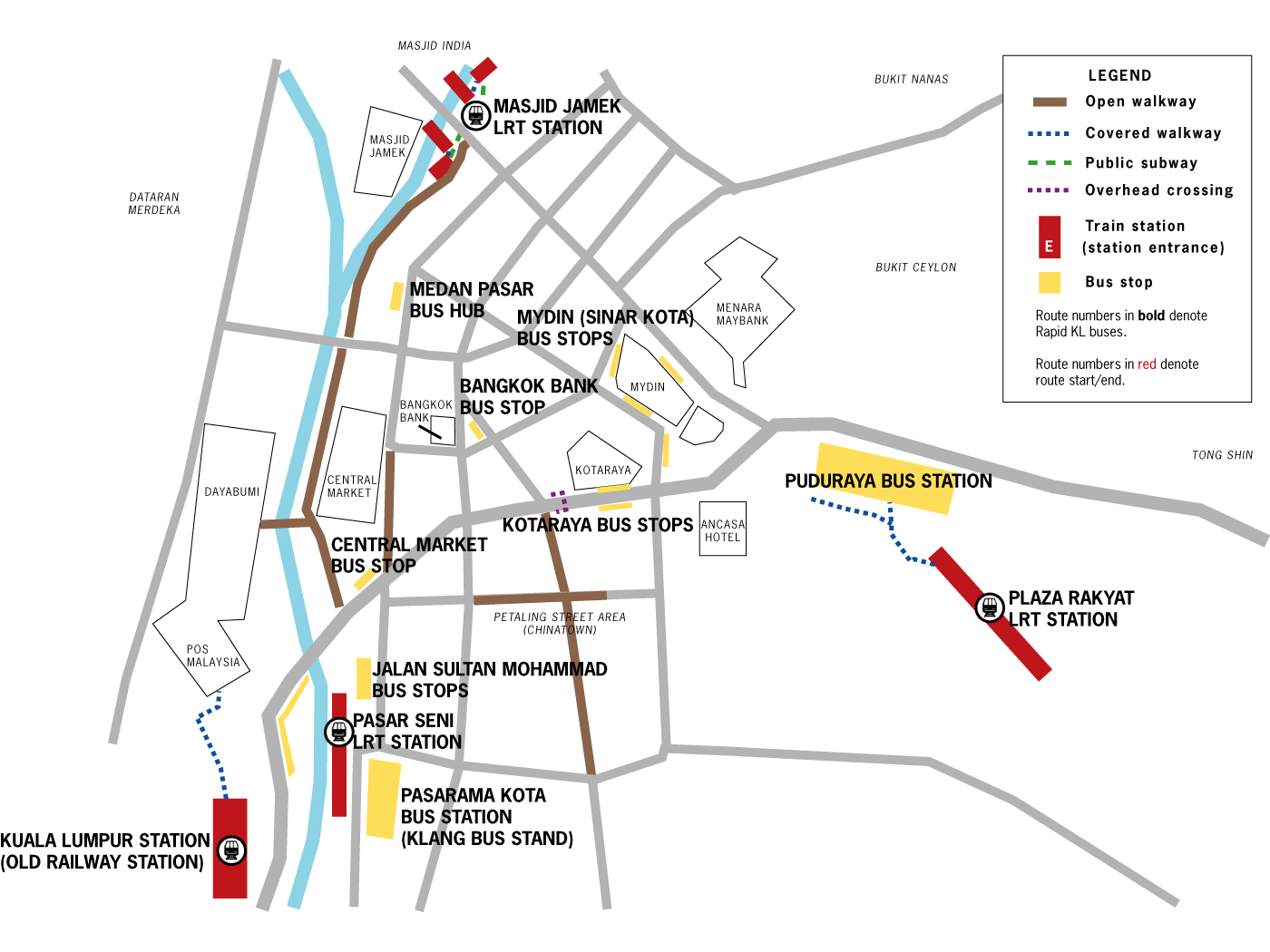

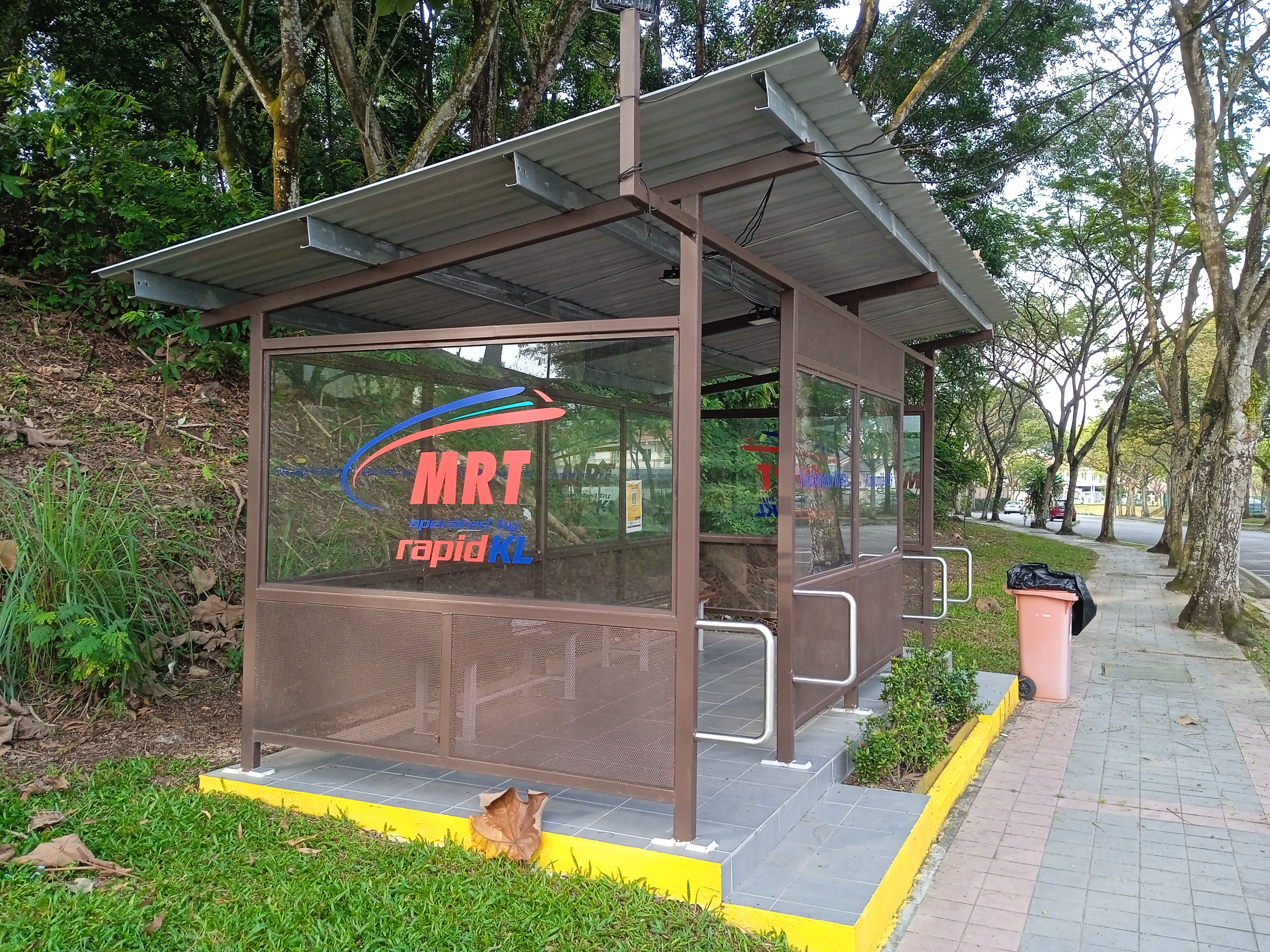
A MRT Feeder Bus stop in Selangor

There are several major bus stops in Kuala Lumpur.

==== Important bus interchange ====
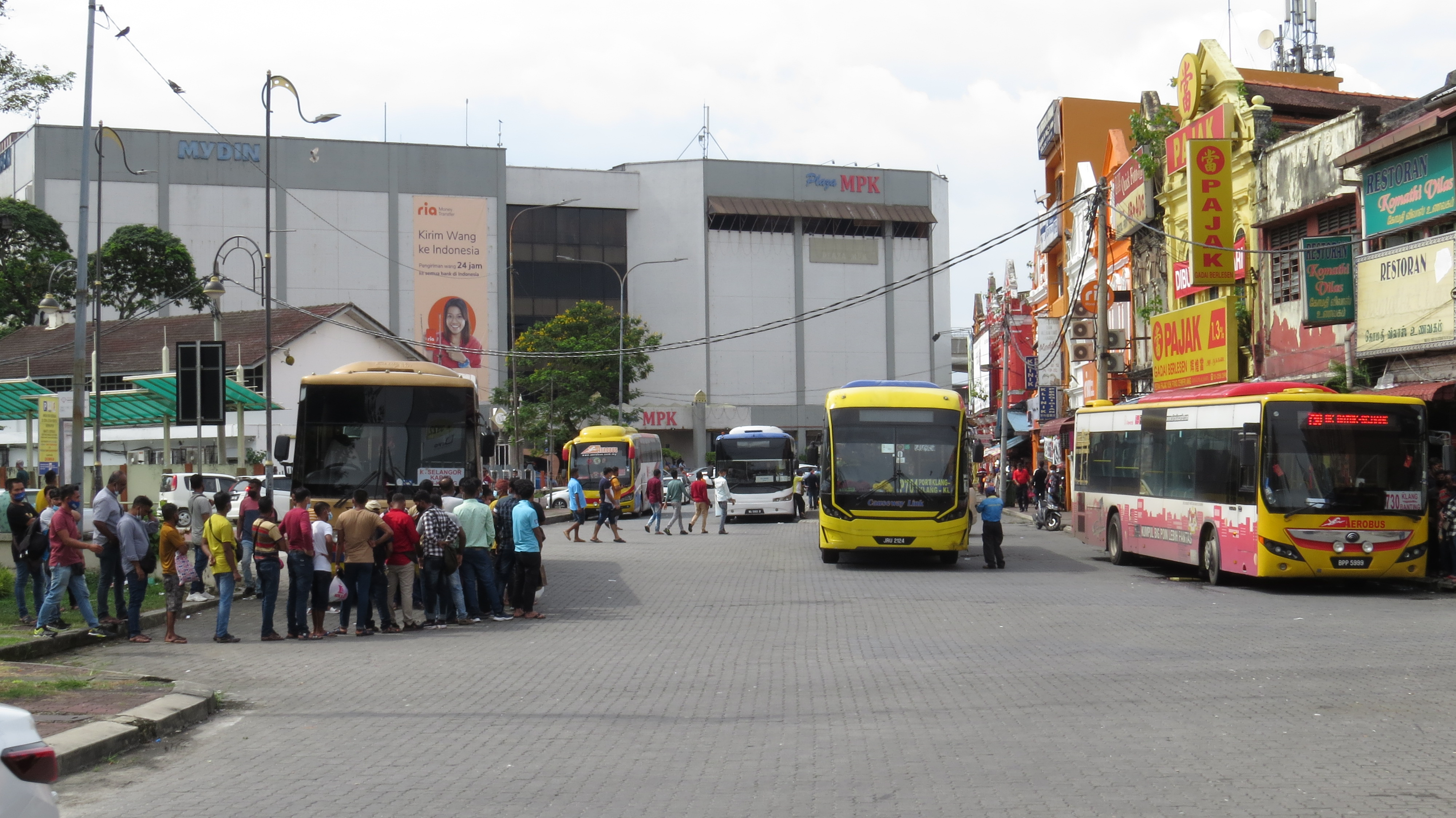
A city bus terminal in Klang, known as Klang Utara Bus Station

List of City bus interchanges:

- Lebuh Pudu Hub (Formerly Kotaraya / Mydin at Jalan Silang / Sinar Kota / Metrojaya; Near Puduraya)
- Pasar Seni hub (Formerly Terminal Jalan Sultan Mohammad / Bus Stand Klang / Pasaramakota)
- Medan Pasar hub (Serves the Jalan Ipoh Corridor & Jalan Pahang Corridor Buses), most of the bus will start their journey at BSN Jalan Ampang near Masjid Jamek station
- Titiwangsa hub (Rapid KL and GoKL buses) - Interchange with Ampang Line, Sri Petaling Line, KL Monorail and MRT Putrajaya Line
- Terminal Bersepadu Selatan (TBS)
- Klang Utara Bus Station near Mydin Klang

Express and long-distance buses: (to other states in Malaysia, as well as international services to Singapore and southern Thailand)

- Pudu Sentral (for Seremban, Tanjung Malim and Teluk Intan routes)
- Hentian Duta (mainly serves northern region)
- Terminal Bersepadu Selatan (TBS)
- Terminal Bersepadu Gombak near Gombak LRT station
- Pekeliling Bus Terminal (for Genting Highlands, Bentong, Raub, Kuala Lipis, Mentakab and Temerloh routes)

Old and former bus interchanges and terminals:

- Pasaramakota bus station (Demolished by MRT Corp for the construction of Pasar Seni MRT station)
- Terminal Putra (Defunct)

=== Stage bus operators ===
==== Rapid KL by Rapid Bus ====
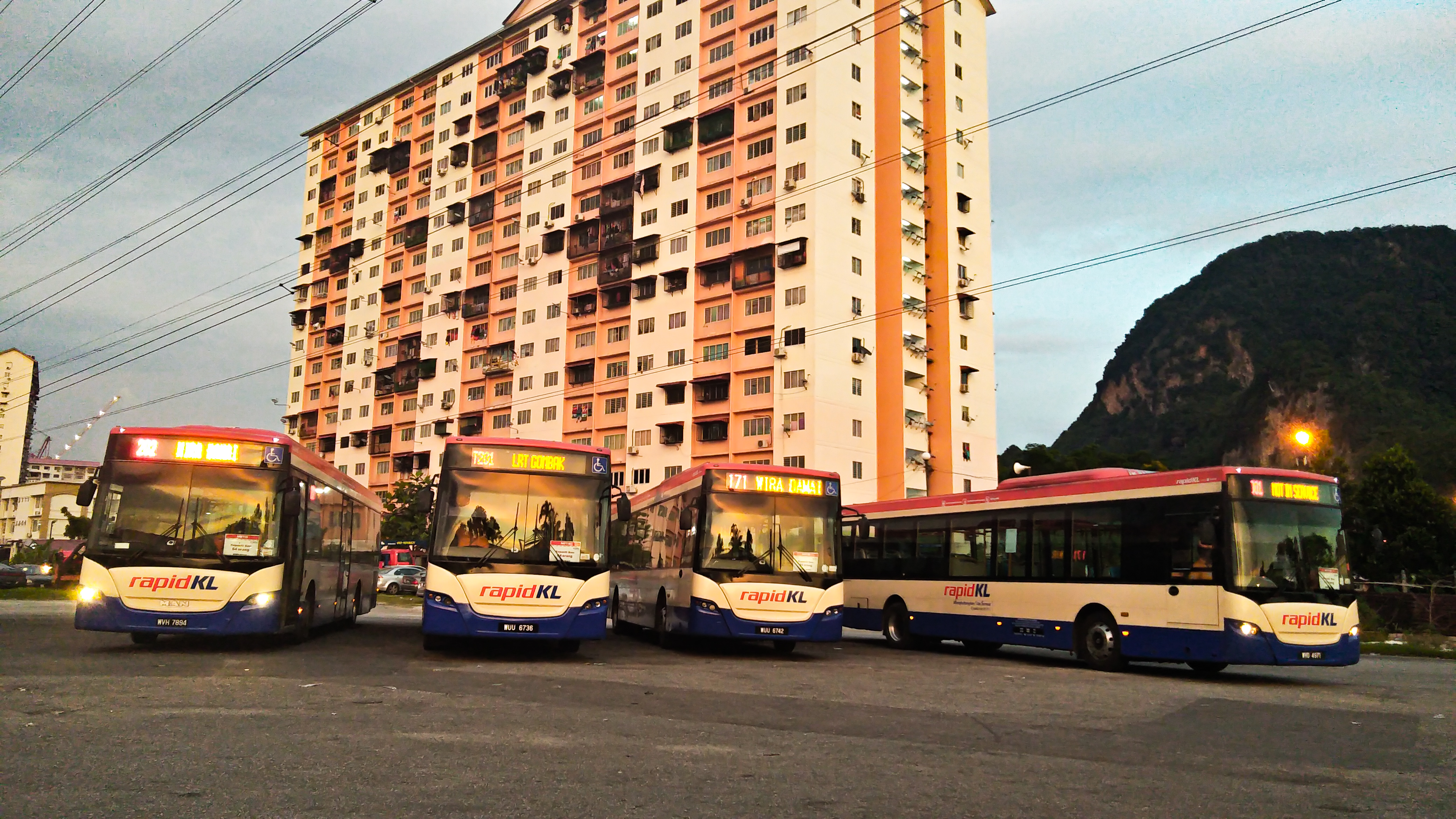
Rapid Bus by Rapid KL, the largest bus operator in Klang Valley

Rapid Bus is the largest bus operator in the Klang Valley. Currently, there are more than 200 routes, which integrates with Klang Valley's Rail Systems. The bus routes operated by Rapid Bus were previously operated by Intrakota Komposit Sdn Bhd, a subsidiary of DRB-HICOM Bhd; and Cityliner Sdn Bhd, a subsidiary of Park May Bhd. Rapid KL bus services cover the entire Federal Territory of Kuala Lumpur and Federal Territory of Putrajaya while in Selangor it covers Petaling district (Petaling Jaya, Damansara, Shah Alam, Subang Jaya, Puchong, Seri Kembangan), Gombak district (Taman Melawati, Gombak, Selayang) and Hulu Langat district (Ampang Jaya, Pandan Indah, Kajang, Bandar Baru Bangi, Semenyih, Hulu Langat) but it has lesser bus coverage in Klang district (Taman Sri Muda, Kota Kemuning, Klang town), Sepang district (Cyberjaya, Taman Mas) and Kuala Selangor district (Puncak Alam area only).

In 2005, Rapid KL buses carried around 190,000 passengers daily. Many of the other bus companies listed here including Metrobus are slowly being phased out and being defunct or unpopular with commuters.

On 18 June 2020, Rapid Bus released new features on real time locations of bus in Google Maps, via collaboration with Google Transit. All the bus routes operated by Rapid Bus are covered with this real time feature including MRT feeder bus service and two other cities.

==== Selangor Omnibus Co. ====
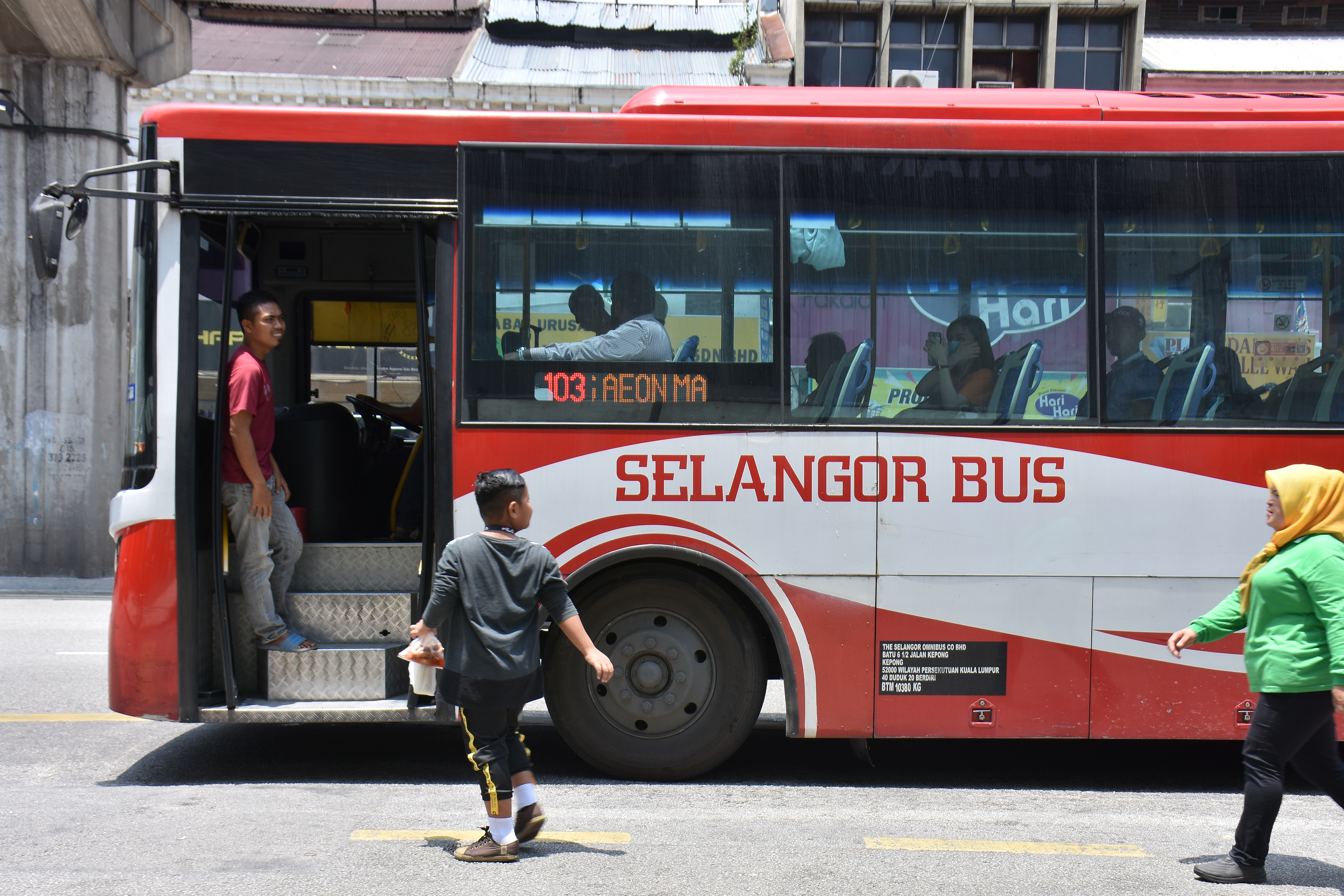
Selangor Omnibus at Chow Kit

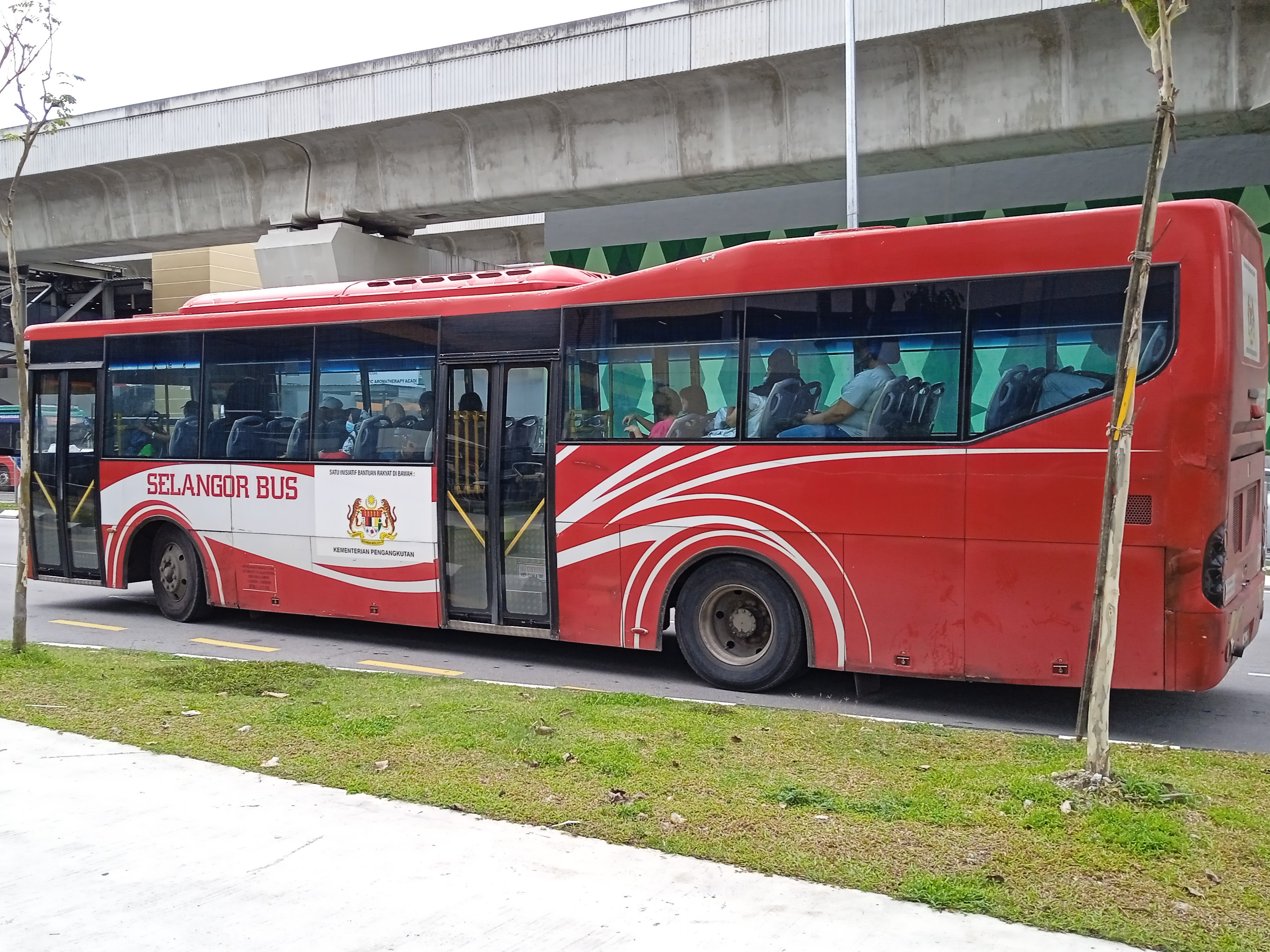
Selangor Omnibus at MRT Metro Prima Entrance B

Established in 1937, Selangor Omnibus is the oldest company in Malaysia, starting its operation between Kuala Lumpur and Kuala Selangor, connecting the northwest and the city centre of Kuala Lumpur. Its famous red and white coloured bus makes it easily recognisable by passengers travelling towards Kuala Selangor. Since then, Selangor Omnibus started covering the northwest rural areas such as Bestari Jaya, Ijok, Paya Jaras, Kepong and Jinjang. Until today, Selangorbus has covered almost 20 northern areas with 6 routes, using combination of new and old buses. Currently the Selangor Omnibus management have been absorbed into Causeway Link.

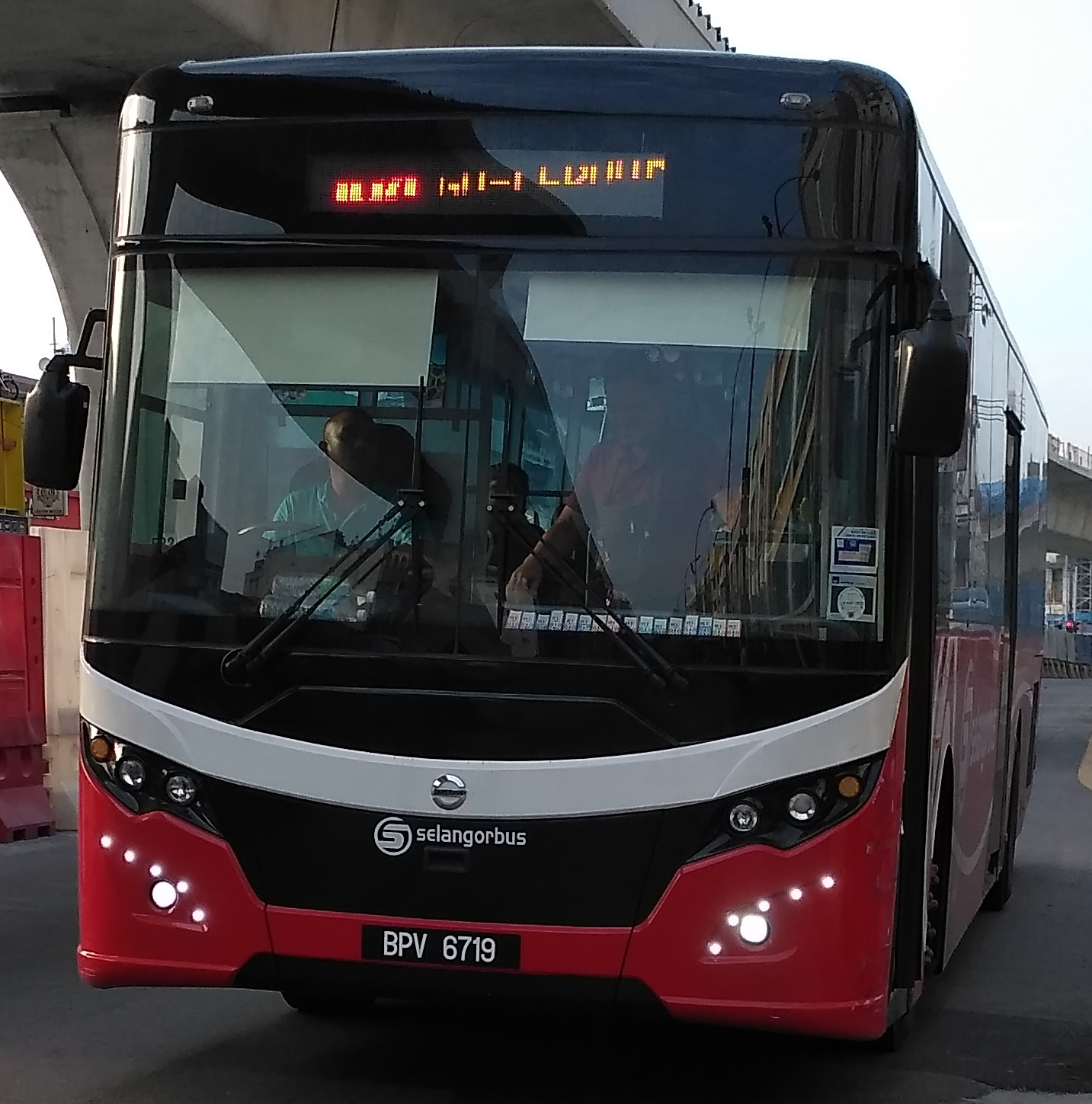
Silverbus SL900 with Selangorbus lovery, currently being used under Smart Selangor MPKS service with new livery

==== Setara Jaya Bus (SJ Bus) ====
MARA Liner bus at Lebuh Pudu bus hub, the bus serves Route 152 to Taman Intan Baiduri, KL that was once served by SJ Bus

Setara Jaya Bus were established in 1989, connecting Tanjung Malim, Rawang, Selayang and Kuala Lumpur areas, using second-hand buses purchased from Rapid KL. The bus company was shut down in 2022 and the service routes is taken over by MARA Liner.

==== Cityliner by Konsortium TransNasional ====
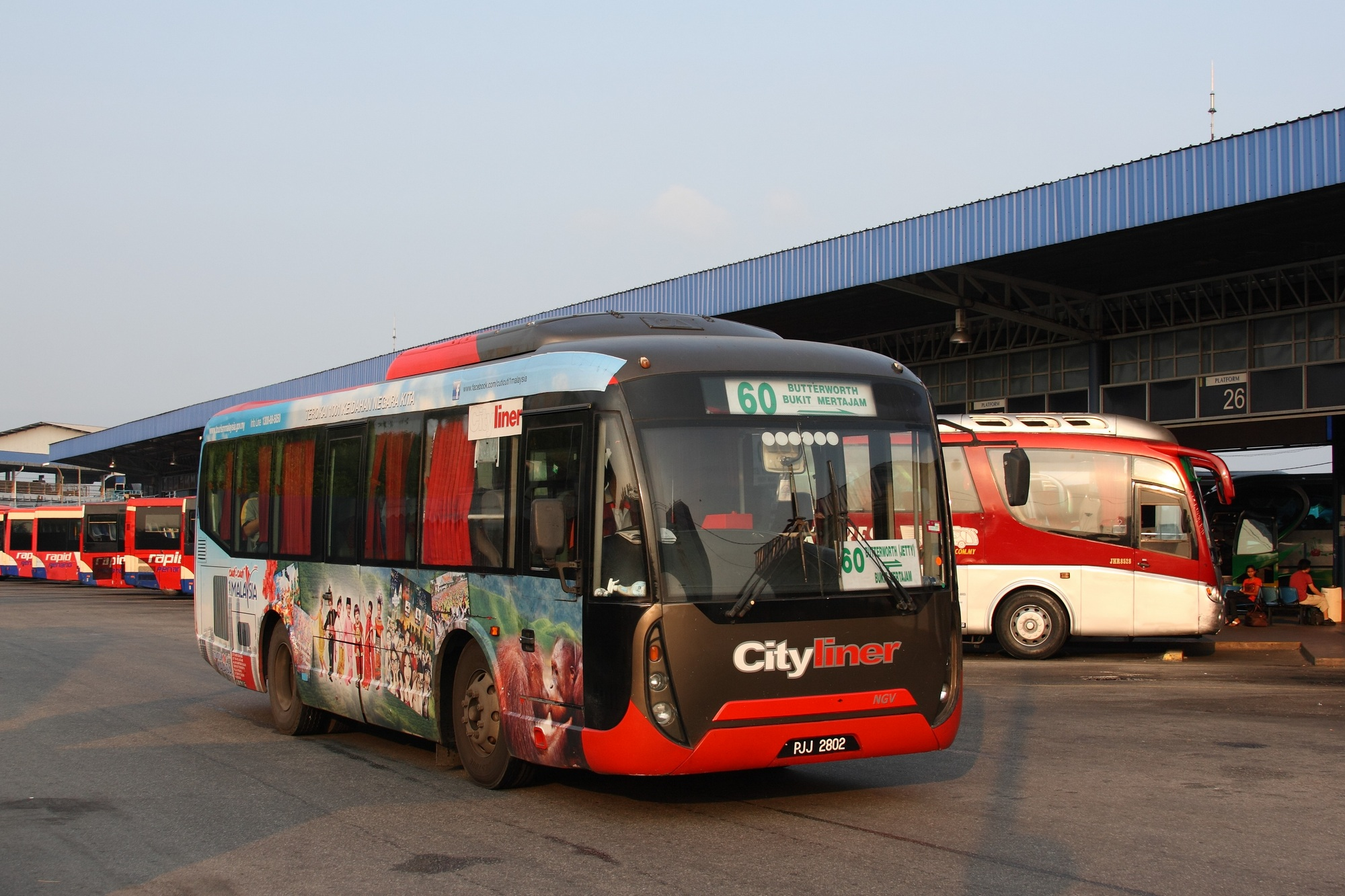
Cityliner bus in Penang

Konsortium Transnasional Berhad (KTB) is the largest private stage bus operator in Malaysia, serving people in states namely Kedah, Penang, Pahang, Kelantan, Negeri Sembilan, and Selangor. With a fleet of more than 700 buses, ranging from mini to double-decker, the red and grey signature colour of Cityliner has been a major mode of transport, connecting rural and urban areas, villages to towns ferrying thousands of passengers every day of the year. From school-going children to housewives buying groceries and workers commuting to work, with trips schedule tailored to the local needs, Cityliner has become part of daily life for many Malaysians.

Cityliner has pioneered the stage bus industry with many firsts. With the rising environmental concerns and increasing fuel prices, Cityliner was the first in the country to opt for Compressed Natural Gas (CNG) technology which allows the buses to run on an alternative source of fuel commonly known as Natural Gas.

Cityliner was also the first in Klang Valley to introduce double-decker stage buses. The additional seating capacity enables Cityliner to carry a double number of passengers of a single deck at one time thus making it the most efficient among the stage bus providers.

The high debt in Kuala Lumpur's Cityliner company, Kenderaan Klang-Banting Berhad results in termination of the company in Kuala Lumpur, resulting some routes were either transferred to other company such as Seranas or Wawasan Sutera, or terminated.

==== Len Seng ====
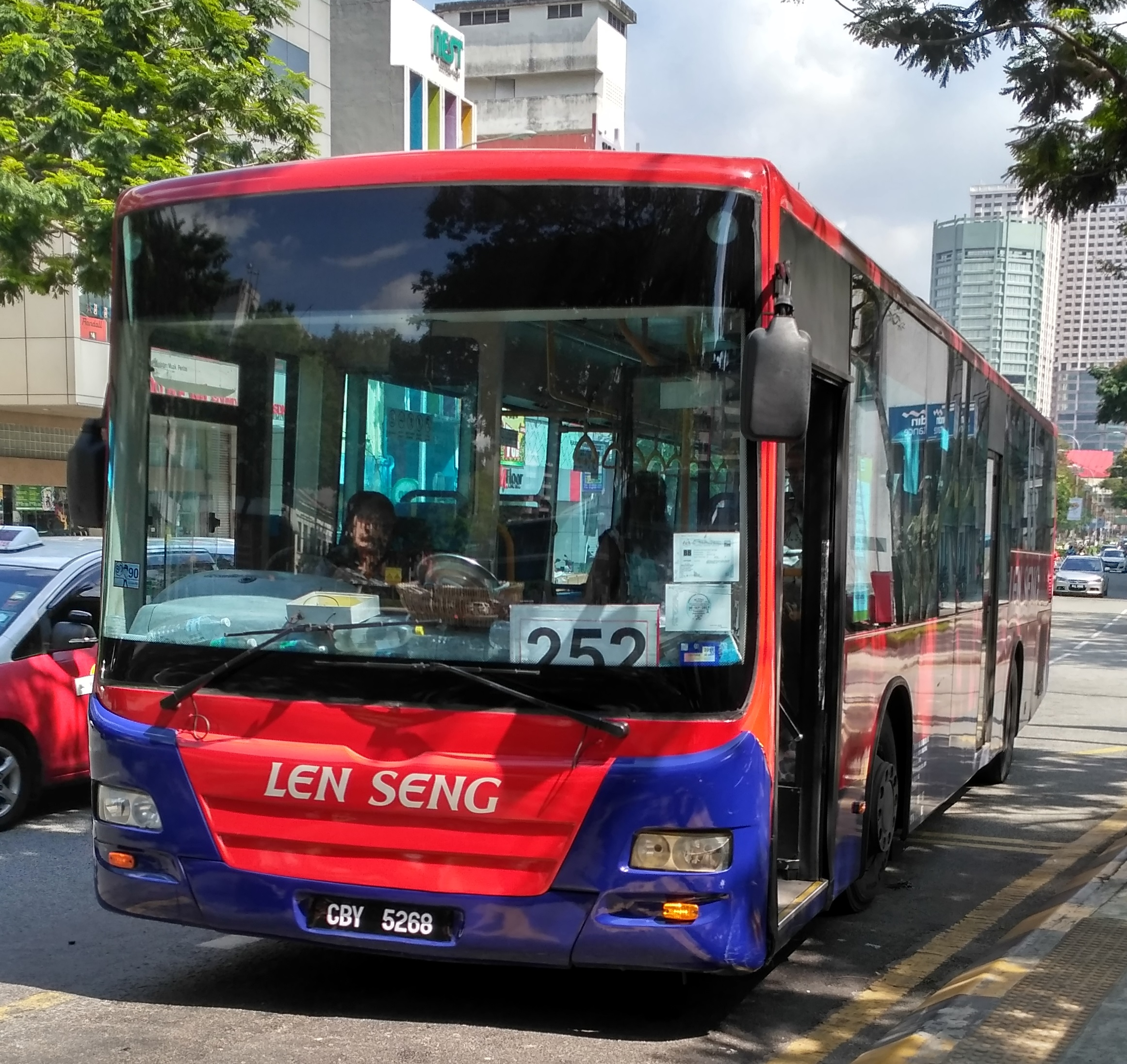
Len Seng's latest fleet, ex-Genting Scania K270 second hand bus

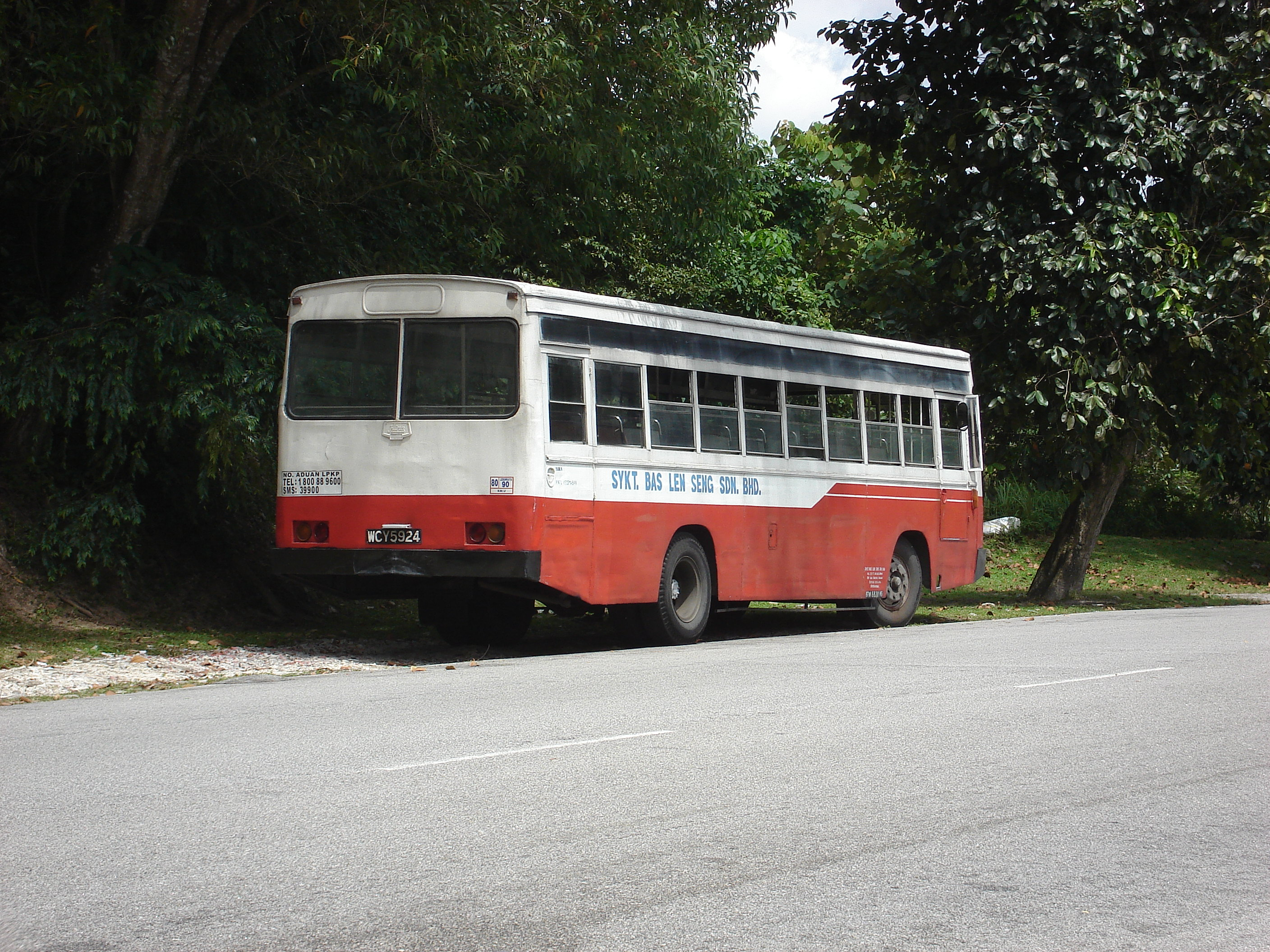
An old Hino manufactured bus owned by Syarikat Bas Len Seng (a bus company in Kuala Lumpur) or also known as Len Seng Omnibus Company

Len Seng Omnibus was formed in the early 60s, covering routes to Ampang Jaya, Setapak and Wangsa Maju. After revamped the routes by SPAD, the company mainly serves the Wangsa Maju areas of bus services 252 (Seksyen 10 Wangsa Maju - Hub Munshi Abdullah). Due to competition on Rapid Bus services 251 (Jentayu AU3 - Seksyen 10 Wangsa Maju - Chow Kit) and T251 (LRT Sri Rampai - Seksyen 10 Wangsa Maju), the services became unpopular, resulting in termination of the services.

==== Nadi Putra ====
Founded in 1999, Nadi Putra is a bus service that is owned by Perbadanan Putrajaya. It operates mainly around Putrajaya and Cyberjaya, as well as trunk buses that link from Putrajaya to Kuala Lumpur, Bandar Saujana Putra and Seri Kembangan.

Since the company took over by GETS Global Berhad in 2018, the service quality has declined, much of the buses were left abandoned due to poor maintenance and service. During the lockdown in 2020 and until 31 December 2022, Nadi Putra abandoned or terminated the outer trunk routes where two of the routes were transferred to KR Travel and Tours, while some of the Putrajaya routes were operated using 15 KBES Foton express bus with the minimal frequency. Beginning January 2023, Putrajaya Corporation returned to operate Nadi Putra bus service with new revamped routes operated by Rapid Bus.

==== Causeway Link ====
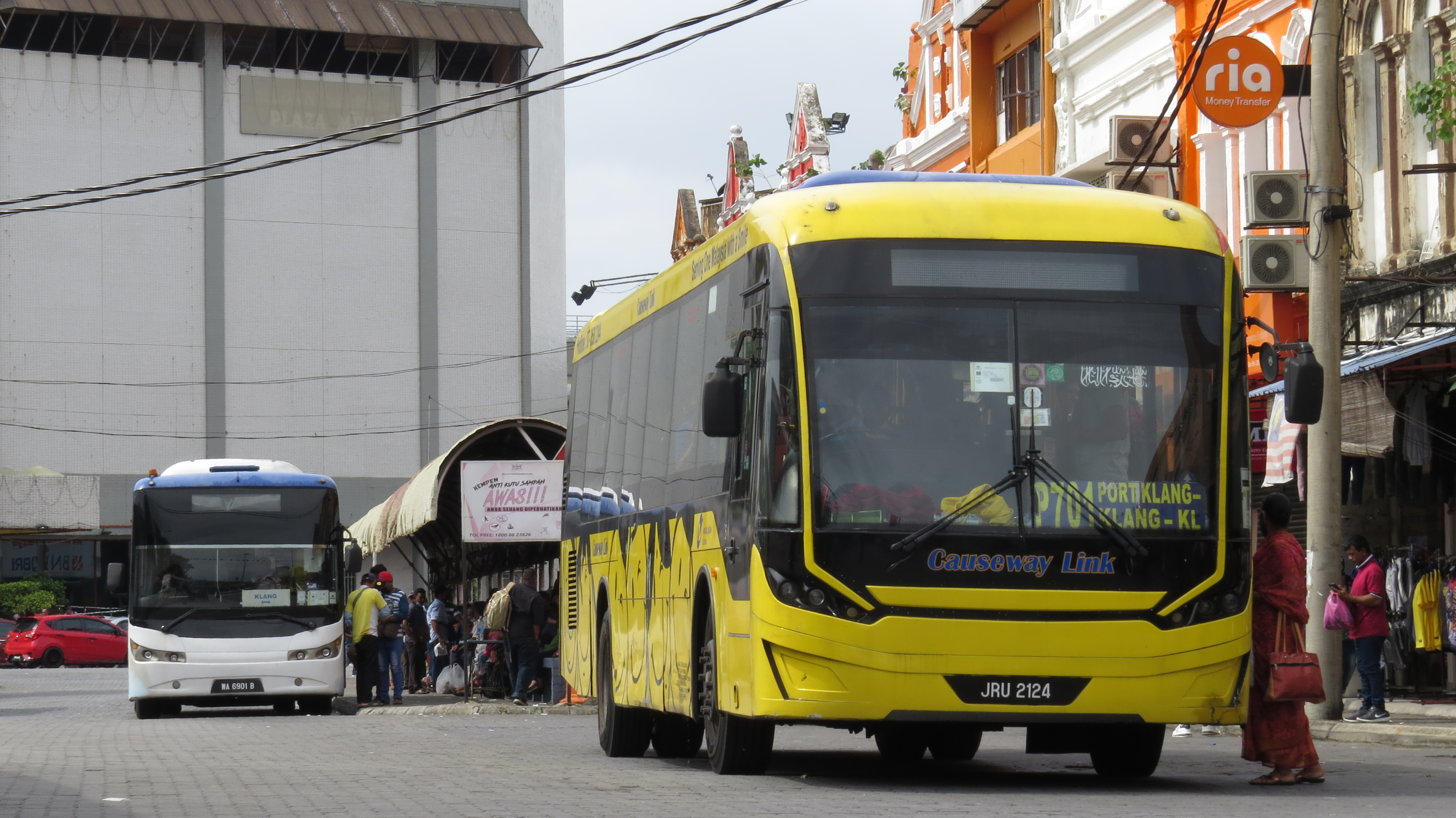
Causeway Link mainly serve Puchong and Klang areas.

Causeway Link was founded in 2003 and is based in Johor Bahru, Johor. Apart from its services in Johor and Singapore, the company mainly serves the areas in Port Klang, Klang and Puchong, Selangor. The company has previously served in the Kepong and Segambut areas of Kuala Lumpur until its transfer to Selangor Omnibus in July 2017. It also operates Smart Selangor Free Bus service in Sepang District.

==== Wawasan Sutera ====
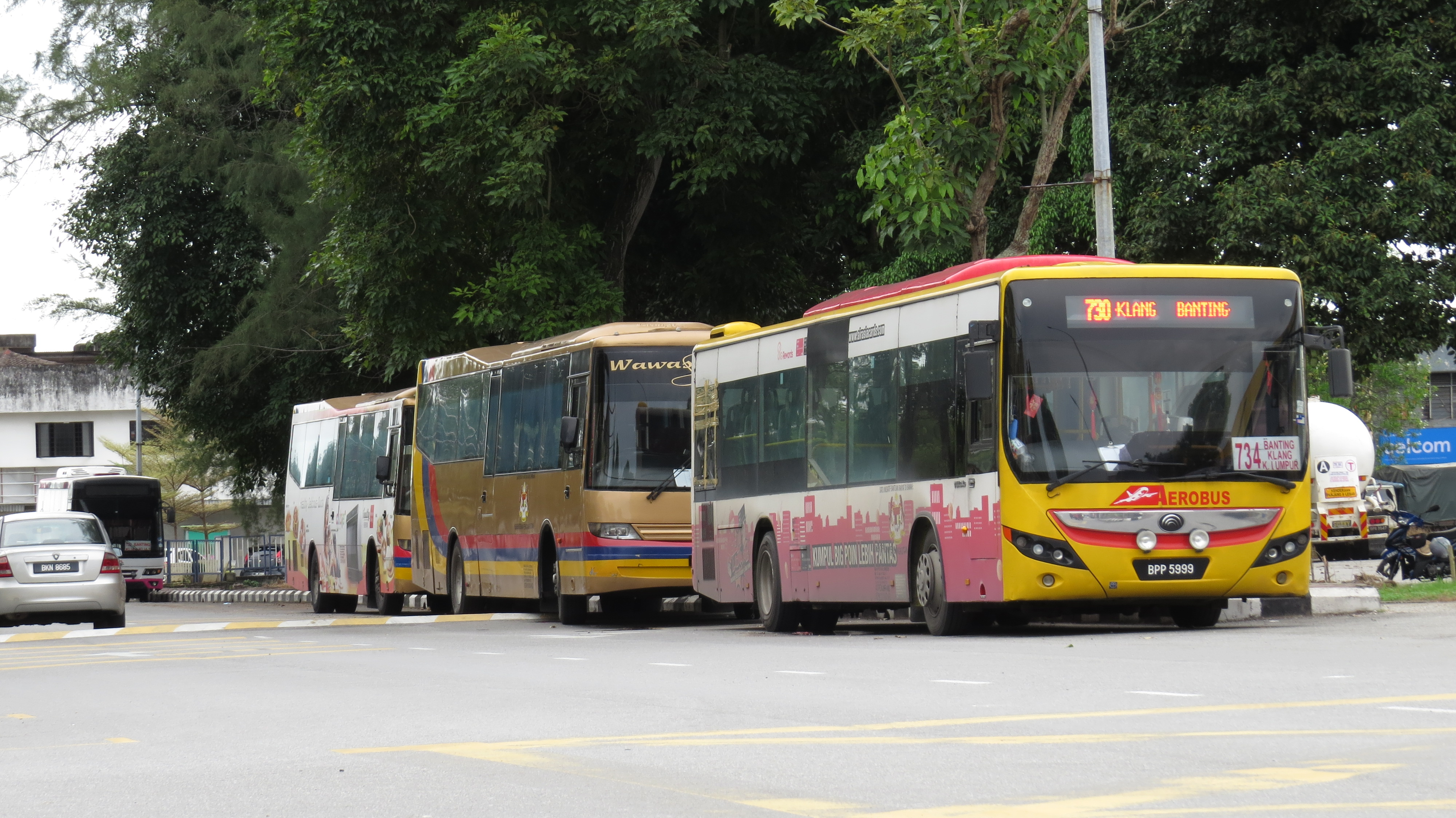
Wawasan Sutera, marketed as Aerobus, mainly serve Klang and Banting areas

Established in 2004 as an express bus service to airports, Wawasan Sutera started its operation from Klang to Kuala Selangor in 2009. The company begin took over the CityLiner routes in Banting, as some routes still shows demand of passengers travelling to some areas in Banting and Klang. As of today, there were 8 routes mainly serve around Klang and Banting areas.

==== KR Travel and Tours (KRTT) ====
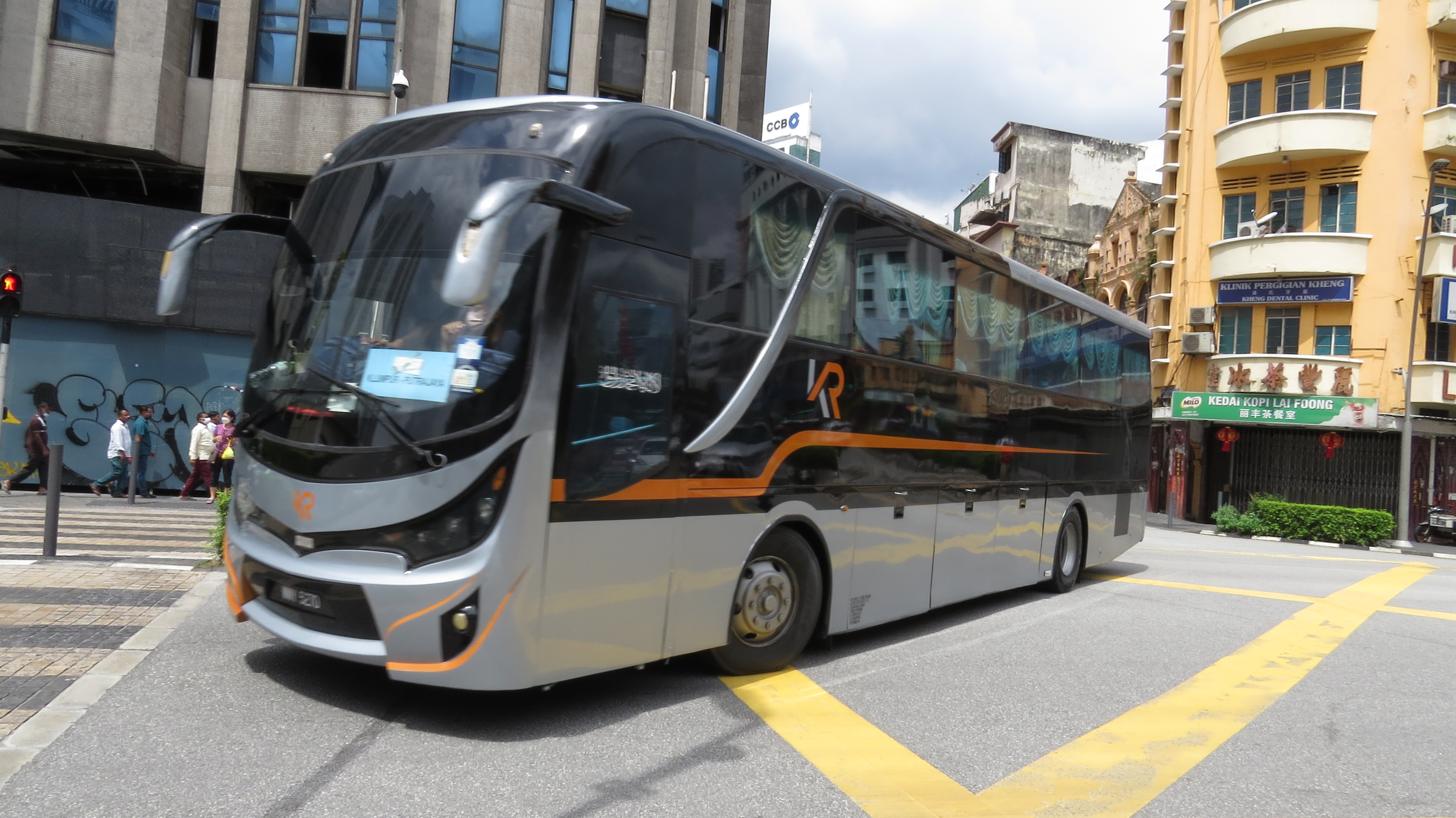
KR Travel and Tours bus operating on Putrajaya's sole route

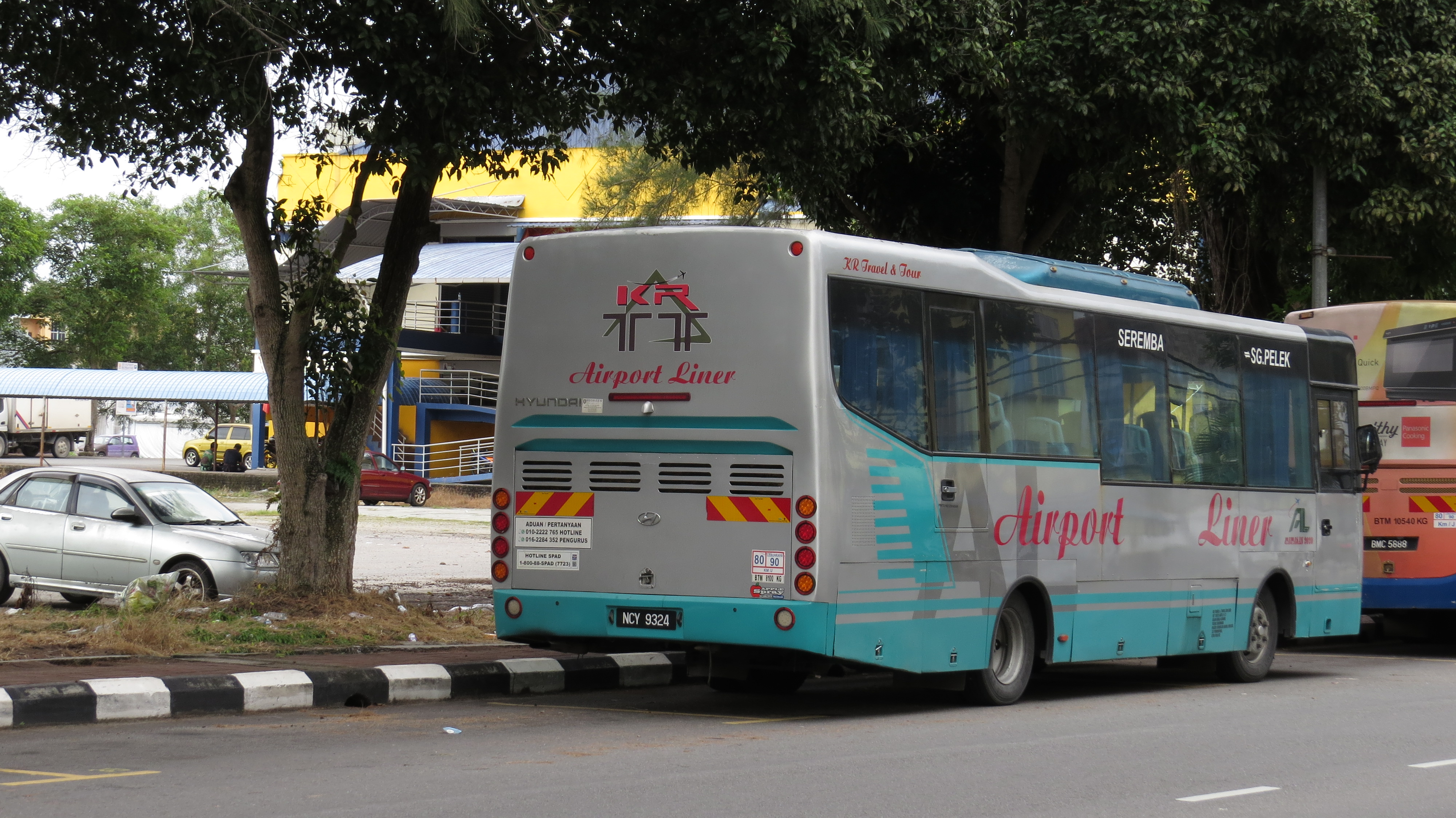
Airport Liner serve between Banting areas and airport terminals.

Founded in 2002, KR Travel and Tours began its operation with tour coach and factory bus services. The company began to operate stagebus service to Klang Valley with takeover of CityLiner route 732 from KLIA to Banting. Until today, KRTT has 2 routes in Klang Valley, connecting Putrajaya areas to Serdang and Kuala Lumpur and Banting to KLIA, marketed as Airport Liner. The company also operates MyBas (Airport Liner) routes from Nilai to KLIA via Bandar Baru Salak Tinggi and Nilai to Sungai Pelek, as well the free shuttle bus for the Long-Term Car Park (LTCP) in KLIA.

=== Klang Valley Bus Network Revamp ===
The Klang Valley Bus Network Revamp or 'Greater Kuala Lumpur Bus Network Revamp (BNR) is a plan implemented by Land Public Transport Commission in Klang Valley and Greater Kuala Lumpur of Malaysia, starting from 1 December 2015.

This plan aims to improve the stage bus services in these areas by providing commuters with higher bus service frequency that covers a wider area, which will subsequently improve its reliability.

Under this system, existing bus corridors were reorganized into eight bus corridors:

- Ampang Corridor
- Cheras Corridor
- Damansara Corridor
- Jalan Ipoh Corridor
- Jalan Pahang Corridor
- Klang Lama Corridor
- Lebuhraya Persekutuan Corridor
- Sungai Besi Corridor

== Taxis ==
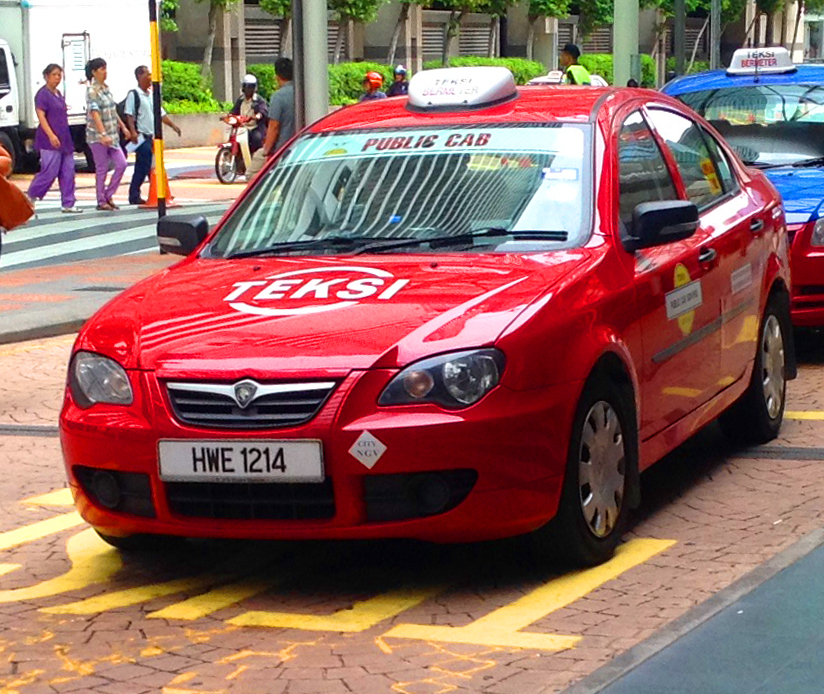
Proton Persona taxi in Kuala Lumpur, where taxis are coloured in red-white, yellow-blue, green, or yellow

=== Teksi bermeter ===
Taxis have been a common sight in Kuala Lumpur ever since the 1950s, and in the 1970s and 1980s, the Morris Oxford was a common model used as a taxi. Metered taxis (Malay: Teksi Bermeter) can be hailed throughout the city. However, traffic jams are fairly common in KL, especially during rush hour, and it might be difficult to get a taxi at that time. There have been many instances of taxi drivers charging extravagant fares, especially for tourists, who are therefore advised to travel in taxis which charge fares according to a meter, and insist that the meter is used.

Taxi stands are available around the city and most taxis will stop at the taxi stand. Taxis in Kuala Lumpur are coloured in various colours such as a combination of red-white, red, yellow-blue, green, or yellow. However, taxis could be easily recognised as the taxis' vehicle registration number carries a prefix H for normal taxis and LIMO for an airport limousine.

=== Motor-Taxis ===
Fixed rate and metered motorcycle-taxi or "motor-taxi" can now be found in and utilized by KL citizens as well as tourists since its introduction on Nov 16, 2016.

== Transit hubs ==
=== Intercity travel ===
For intercity travel, the main transit hubs in Kuala Lumpur are:

- Pudu Sentral — an intercity bus terminal located in the city centre. A new bus terminal, Plaza Rakyat is planned to replace neighbouring Pudu Sentral. However, the construction has been halted indefinitely. There are an LRT and MRT station nearby that connects to the building. Express buses to airports still operates at this terminal.
- KL Sentral — Kuala Lumpur's main railway station and bus hubs for shuttles to Genting Highlands, KLIA and klia2.
- Pekeliling Bus Terminal — the combination of local and express buses to Genting Highlands, Bentong, Raub, Kuala Lipis, Jerantut and Temerloh.
- Duta Bus Terminal — for buses operated by Transnasional, Airport Coach (bus services to KLIA) and northern express bus.
- Terminal Bersepadu Selatan - The newest transport hub in the Klang Valley, replaced Pudu Sentral as the major hub for all intercity buses in the Klang Valley. Connecting with KTM Seremban Line, KTM ETS, KLIA Transit & LRT Sri Petaling Line.

=== Local rail transport ===
- KL Sentral — a modern multi-modal transport hub served by KTM Komuter, KTM ETS, LRT, MRT, ERL, KL Monorail as well as local buses, airport buses to the KLIA, shuttle bus to Genting Highlands and several intercity buses
- Masjid Jamek — an LRT interchange between the LRT Kelana Jaya Line, LRT Ampang Line & LRT Sri Petaling Lines.
- Bandar Tasik Selatan — a train interchange between the LRT Sri Petaling Line, KTM Batu Caves - Pulau Sebang Line, KTM ETS, and ERL KLIA Transit.
- Pasar Seni — a bus hub Hab Bas Pasar Seni together with a MRT/LRT interchange between the LRT Kelana Jaya Line and MRT Kajang Line. Connecting to KTM Kuala Lumpur for KTM Komuter, KTM ETS

=== Local bus terminals ===
KL Sentral, Titiwangsa, KLCC, Maluri, and Medan Pasar form Rapid KL's bus interchanges in the city. Meanwhile, private bus operators are mostly based at the Jalan Tun Tan Cheng Lock (formerly known as Jalan Cheng Lock) area which includes Pasaramakota, Central Market, Bangkok Bank, Medan Pasar, Kotaraya, Sinar Kota and Puduraya. Several suburban bus hubs serve as terminals and interchanges.

=== Legacy terminals ===
Traditionally, most bus services, whether local or intercity originated from the city centre, especially in the areas around Jalan Tun Tan Cheng Lock. Recently transport operators have decided to unilaterally move operations elsewhere. For example, executive bus operators, especially those headed for Singapore, have switched to less congested locations like the Kuala Lumpur Railway Station, KL Sentral, Bangsar and Petaling Jaya. Rapid KL itself has shifted operations to its city hubs. The government meanwhile has been encouraging buses to use other newer terminals like Pasarakyat and Duta Bus Terminal.

The Kuala Lumpur Railway Station ceased to serve intercity trains in 2001 when operations shifted to neighbouring KL Sentral. However, many other operations such as KTM Komuter services and postal services by Pos Malaysia are still maintained there.

=== Intermodal hubs ===
There are various intermodal transport hubs in Kuala Lumpur, with one major intermodal transport hub in the city centre of Kuala Lumpur, the Kuala Lumpur Sentral transport hub.

Kuala Lumpur Sentral

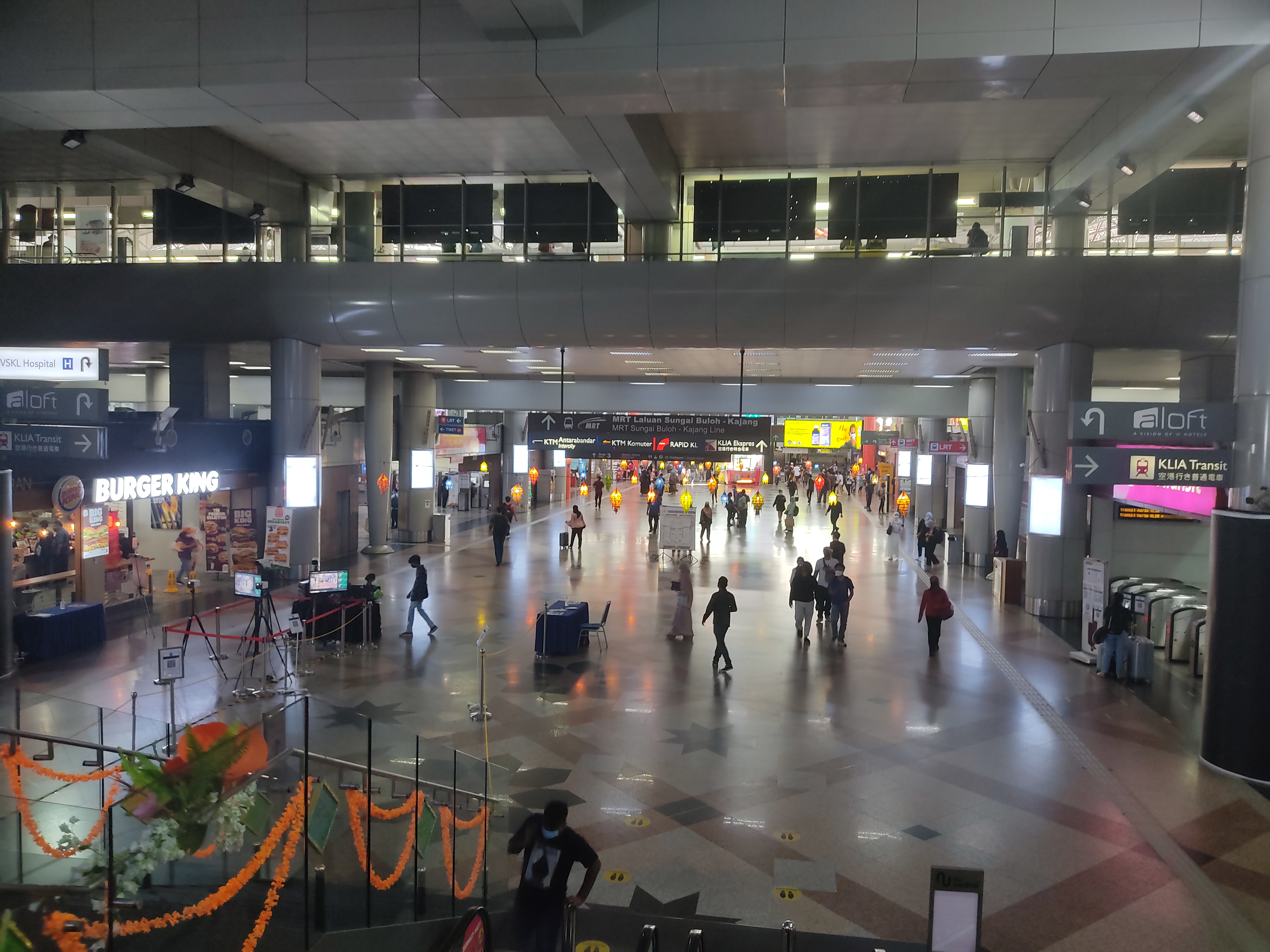
Kuala Lumpur Sentral is the largest railway station in Southeast Asia.

Kuala Lumpur Sentral (KL Sentral) or Sentral Kuala Lumpur is a transit-oriented development that houses the main railway station of Kuala Lumpur, which has officially taken over the role of Kuala Lumpur Railway Station. It is the largest railway station in Southeast Asia.

Stesen Sentral is designated the transport hub within its KL Sentral development project, although both the public and connected transit lines generally refer to the station itself as "KL Sentral". Among rail lines in Kuala Lumpur, Kelana Jaya Line, KL Monorail, KTM Komuter, KTM Intercity, KLIA Ekspres and KLIA Transit integrate in this railway station.

Located within Stesen Sentral, the KL City Air Terminal (KL CAT) is virtually an extension of the Kuala Lumpur International Airport. KL CAT also has luggage check-in services. Currently, only passengers flying Malaysia Airlines, Cathay Pacific, Emirates, Batik Air and Royal Brunei Airlines can check-in their luggage at KL CAT. KL Sentral has also been made a city bus hub by Rapid KL under its bus network revamp.

Pudu Sentral

Puduraya, now known as Pudu Sentral was the main bus terminus for Kuala Lumpur. Long-distance buses arrive and leave from Puduraya for all over Malaysia. Under Kuala Lumpur 2020 Structural Plan, there are plans to move some bus operators to inter-regional hubs in other parts of Kuala Lumpur such as Hentian Duta, Gombak Hub, and Bandar Tasik Selatan hub to avoid massive congestion in Puduraya. Pudu Sentral is accessible via Ampang Line, at Plaza Rakyat Station

== Roads ==
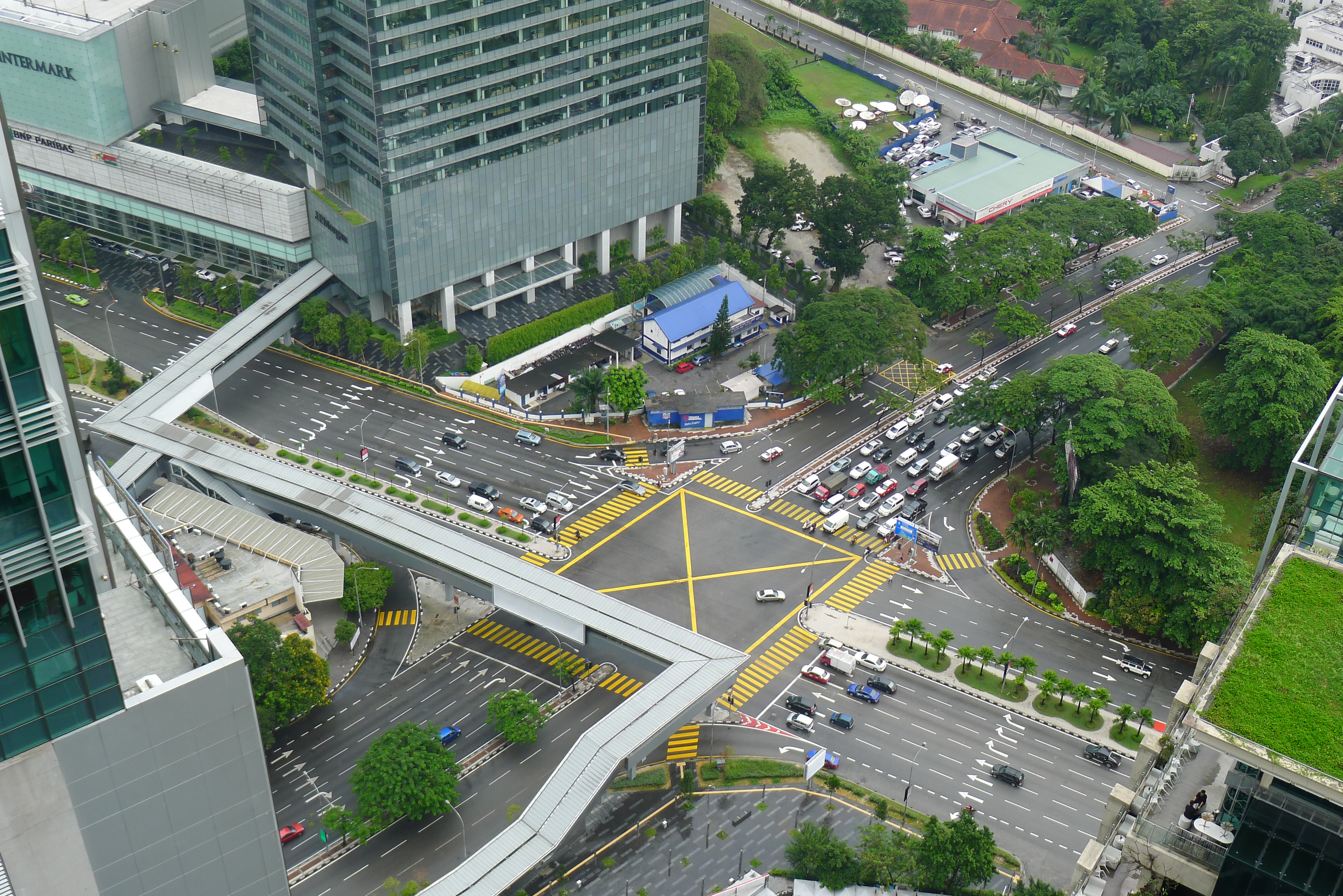
Jalan Ampang and Tun Razak junction in central Kuala Lumpur. An elevated pedestrian walkway spans the two roads, connecting nearby buildings to the Ampang Park LRT & MRT underground stations.

Road traffic of Jalan Kuching, Kuala Lumpur during noon

Roads are the major arteries of Kuala Lumpur's transport network. The road network system in Kuala Lumpur is similar to the city road network system in major Chinese cities, where it has ring roads. The main ring roads in Kuala Lumpur are the Kuala Lumpur Inner Ring Road (IRR), Kuala Lumpur Middle Ring Road 1 (MRR1), and Kuala Lumpur Middle Ring Road 2 (MRR2). Roads in Kuala Lumpur are usually 3 lanes in each direction, and certain roads such as Jalan Sultan Ismail and Jalan Bukit Bintang are one-way streets.

=== Expressways ===
Expressways in Kuala Lumpur are tolled roads. They serve as an alternative during peak periods at which time some parts of Kuala Lumpur's ring roads become highly congested. Kuala Lumpur is well connected by many intracity expressways such as the Ampang–Kuala Lumpur Elevated Highway (AKLEH). Moreover, Kuala Lumpur is the home for the world's first SMART Tunnel, which is a unique solution to Kuala Lumpur's long-term traffic problems and floodwater mitigation woes.

Most expressways in Kuala Lumpur adopt an open toll collection system. NKVE is the only closed toll system in the Klang Valley. In the open toll system, the user pays the toll at each toll plaza, while for the closed toll system, the tolls are to be paid at the toll plazas when exiting the expressway. Payment options includes cash, stored value card Touch 'n Go, debit and credit cards, or the electronic toll collection system SmartTAG.

Access from the city to the surrounding areas is facilitated by a series of expressways that are both integrated and complex. From the city centre to the south-western areas, access is provided mainly by the Federal Highway which connects the city to Klang and bridging Petaling Jaya, Subang Jaya, Kelana Jaya and Shah Alam. The New Pantai Expressway (NPE) provides an alternative route to Subang Jaya, bypassing the morning and evening traffic congestion on the Federal Highway. An alternative connection to Shah Alam, Subang Jaya, and Klang is provided by the New Klang Valley Expressway (NKVE) which connects with the Sprint Expressway. This connects the city centre to Damansara, to the west. The NKVE also provides connections to Sungai Buloh and Kepong and is linked to the northern section of the North–South Expressway, which provides access to northern states like Perak, Penang and Kedah. The connection from Damansara in the northwest to Puchong in the south-west of Kuala Lumpur is facilitated by Damansara–Puchong Expressway (LDP), which also provides a connection to Putrajaya.

Access from the city centre to southern areas is provided by the Sungai Besi Expressway, which leads to Bukit Jalil and Sungai Besi. The highway runs in parallel with the Kuala Lumpur–Seremban Expressway. The highway also provides an alternative route to Kajang by connecting with the Kajang Dispersal Link Expressway (SILK).

Access from the city centre to the south-eastern areas is provided by the Cheras Highway which connects to Cheras. The highway is connected with the Cheras–Kajang Expressway (CKE), which provides access to Kajang and that highway itself is connected with the Kajang–Seremban Highway (LEKAS) and the SILK highway, giving alternative access to Seremban and southern parts of the city.

The connection from the city centre to eastern areas is provided by Ampang–Kuala Lumpur Elevated Highway (AKLEH). The highway is connected to Kuala Lumpur Middle Ring Road 2 (MRR2) for access to Batu Caves and Gombak. Near Kuala Lumpur–Karak Expressway, it provides access to the east coast states of Peninsular Malaysia. There is no dedicated highway leading from the city centre to the northern areas such as Batu Caves. However, Jalan Kuching is the main road from the city to the northern area.

The MRR2 connects with Shah Alam Expressway (KESAS) which provides yet another alternative route to Shah Alam and Subang Jaya. The KESAS highway also has connections to the Kuala Lumpur–Seremban Expressway which integrates with the southern section of the North–South Expressway, which serves the southern states of Peninsular Malaysia, and the North–South Expressway Central Link (ELITE) which provides access to the Kuala Lumpur International Airport (KLIA).

The connection from the city to Putrajaya is facilitated by a direct highway, the Maju Expressway (MEX) which also provides connections to KLIA through the ELITE highway. The MEX highway also provides alternative access to southern areas of the city such as Puchong and Bukit Jalil.

Below is a non-exhaustive list of expressway serving the Klang Valley area:

Highway shield and Name	Abbreviation	Areas Served	Connections to other Expressways
North–South Expressway Northern Route (New Klang Valley Expressway)	NKVE	Subang Jaya, Shah Alam, Klang, Petaling Jaya, Damansara	North–South Expressway Northern Route, ELITE, Sprint Expressway, GCE
Shah Alam Expressway	KESAS	Shah Alam, USJ, Klang, Kota Kemuning, Bukit Jalil, Sri Petaling	MEX, Kuala Lumpur–Seremban Expressway
North–South Expressway Central Link	ELITE	Putrajaya, Cyberjaya, USJ, KLIA, Saujana Putra, Shah Alam, Nilai	NKVE, North South Expressway, KESAS, GCE, SKVE
Cheras–Kajang Expressway ( FT 1)	CKE	Cheras, Kajang	Cheras Highway, SUKE, LEKAS, SILK, SMART Tunnel
Sungai Besi Expressway	SBE	Sungai Besi, Bandar Tasik Selatan	SILK, North–South Expressway, Kuala Lumpur-Seremban Expressway, Salak Expressway, NPE, SUKE, SKVE
New Pantai Expressway	NPE	Subang Jaya, Petaling Jaya, Kuchai Lama, Pantai	Federal Highway, Kuala Lumpur–Seremban Expressway, LDP
Damansara–Puchong Expressway	LDP	Kepong, Damansara, Petaling Jaya, Puchong, Cyberjaya, Putrajaya	MRR2, DASH, Sprint Expressway, Federal Highway, NPE, KESAS, SKVE
Ampang–Kuala Lumpur Elevated Highway	AKLEH	Jalan Tun Razak, Jalan Sultan Ismail, Setiawangsa, Ampang	MRR2, SPE, SUKE
Kemuning–Shah Alam Highway	LKSA	Kota Kemuning, Shah Alam	KESAS, Federal Highway
Kajang Dispersal Link Expressway	SILK	Kajang, Cheras, Sungai Long	SKVE, CKE, SBE, EKVE, LEKAS, North-South Expressway Southern Route
Sungai Besi–Ulu Klang Elevated Expressway	SUKE	Ulu Kelang, Ampang, Cheras, Taman Connaught, Sungai Besi, Sri Petaling	MRR2, DUKE, AKLEH, CKE, Kuala Lumpur-Seremban Expressway, SBE, KESAS
Maju Expressway	MEX	Jalan Tun Razak, Bukit Jalil, Seri Kembangan, Putrajaya, Cyberjaya	Kuala Lumpur–Seremban Expressway, KESAS, ELITE, SPE
Kajang–Seremban Highway	LEKAS	Kajang, Semenyih, Seremban	CKE, Cheras Highway
Sprint Expressway	—N/a	Damansara, Mont Kiara, TTDI, Petaling Jaya, Taman Duta, Sungai Penchala, Pantai, Kampung Kerinchi	NKVE, Federal Highway, LDP, DUKE, DASH, SPE
Kuala Lumpur–Kuala Selangor Expressway	LATAR	Ijok, Puncak Alam, Rawang	West Coast Expressway (WCE), GCE
South Klang Valley Expressway	SKVE	Pulau Indah, Klang, Teluk Panglima Garang, Banting, Jenjarom, Saujana Putra, Putrajaya, Sepang	WCE, ELITE, LDP, SILK, SBE
East Klang Valley Expressway	EKVE	Ampang, Ulu Kelang, Cheras, Kajang	MRR2, SUKE, SILK
New North Klang Straits Bypass	NNKSB	Port Klang, Klang, Pulau Indah, Bukit Raja	WCE, Federal Highway, NKVE
Damansara–Shah Alam Elevated Expressway	DASH	Puncak Perdana, Denai Alam, Subang, Subang Airport, Damansara	LDP, Sprint Expressway, GCE
Guthrie Corridor Expressway	GCE	Rawang, Sungai Buloh, Shah Alam	North-South Expressway Northern Route, LATAR, DASH, NKVE, ELITE
Duta–Ulu Klang Expressway	DUKE	Taman Duta, Sentul, Segambut, Ulu Klang, Gombak, Kepong	NKVE, Kuala Lumpur–Rawang Highway, MRR2, Kuala Lumpur–Karak Expressway, SPE, LDP, Sprint Expressway
East–West Link Expressway (Kuala Lumpur–Seremban Expressway)	—N/a	Kuala Lumpur, Seremban, Kajang, Bangi, Nilai	ELITE, North–South Expressway Southern Route, SMART Tunnel, MEX, SBE, SUKE, MRR2, SPE
East–West Link Expressway (Salak Expressway)	—N/a	Cheras, Taman Connaught, Sungai Besi	Cheras Highway, CKE, Kuala Lumpur–Seremban Expressway, SMART Tunnel, SBE, SUKE
SMART Tunnel	SMART	Jalan Sultan Ismail, Jalan Tun Razak	Kuala Lumpur–Seremban Expressway, Cheras Highway, Salak Expressway, CKE
Setiawangsa–Pantai Expressway	SPE	Taman Melati, Wangsa Maju, Setiawangsa, Kampung Pandan, Pantai, Kampung Kerinchi	MRR2, DUKE, AKLEH, MEX, Salak Expressway, Kuala Lumpur-Seremban Expressway, Federal Highway, Sprint Expressway
FT 1 Cheras Highway	—N/a	Cheras, Sungai Besi	CKE, MRR1, MRR2, Salak Expressway
FT 2 Federal Highway	—N/a	Klang, Petaling Jaya, Subang Jaya, Subang Airport, Kelana Jaya, Shah Alam	NPE, LDP, Sprint Expressway, Salak Expressway, SPE, NNKSB, LKSA

=== Other roads ===
- Jalan Batu Caves
- Jalan Sungai Tua
- Kepong–Selayang Highway
- Klang–Banting Highway

== Airports ==
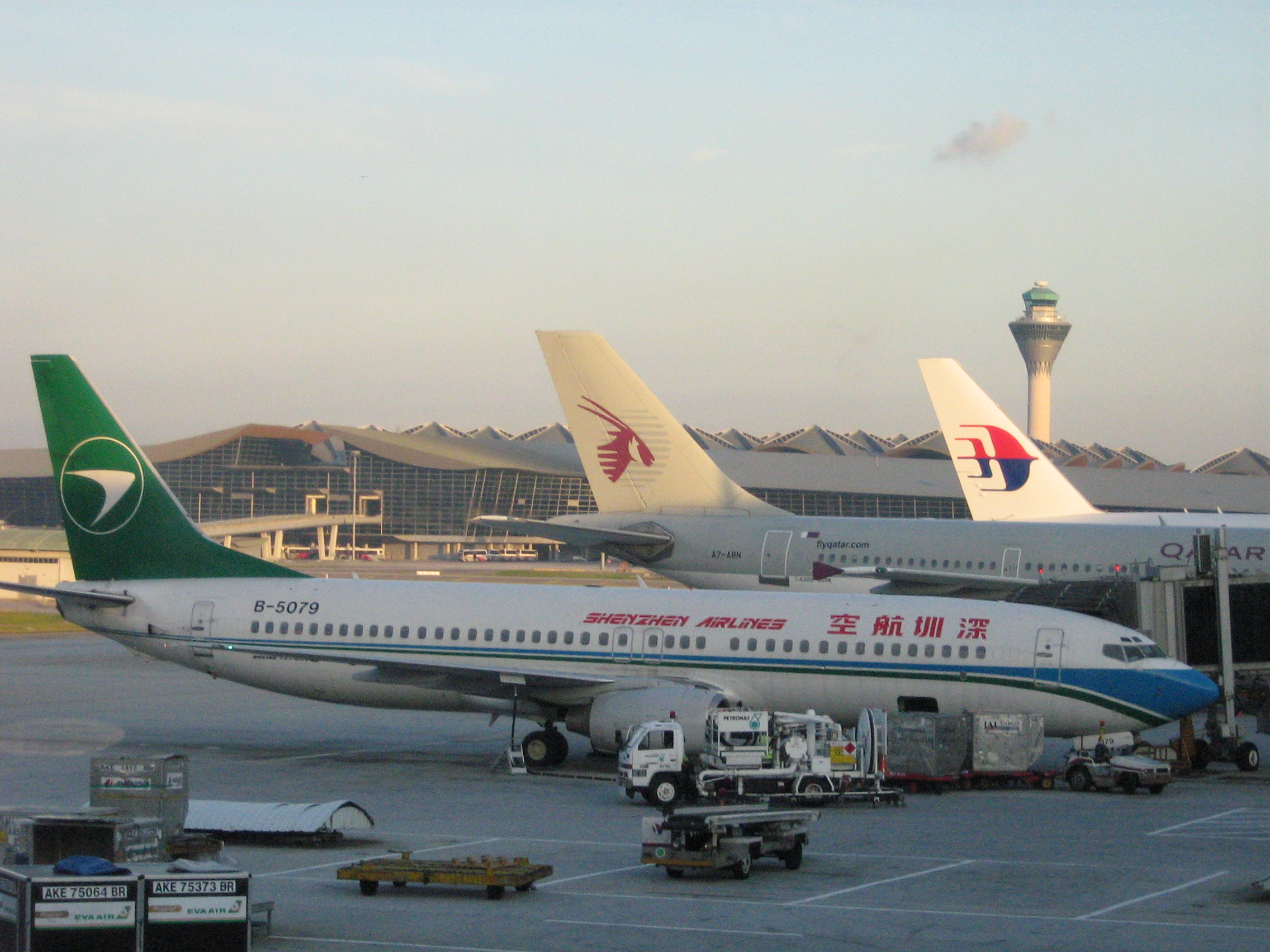
Qatar Airways, Malaysia Airlines and Shenzhen Airlines parked at Kuala Lumpur International Airport

Kuala Lumpur International Airport

The first airport in Kuala Lumpur, Simpang Airport, commenced operations in 1952 and was the main airport for Malaysia until 1965. In 1965, the Subang International Airport became the main international airport in Kuala Lumpur and Malaysia until 1998, before being taken over by the new constructed Kuala Lumpur International Airport (KLIA) in Sepang. The Simpang Airport was taken over by and converted into an air-base for the Royal Malaysian Air Force, while the Subang Airport (renamed Sultan Abdul Aziz Shah Airport) was repurposed as a general aviation and low-cost carrier airport.

Kuala Lumpur is the main gateway for Malaysia as it has the country biggest airport, Kuala Lumpur International Airport, about 25 million passengers used the airport, making it the busiest airport in Malaysia.

The city is served by 2 airports, which is Kuala Lumpur International Airport and Sultan Abdul Aziz Shah Airport (formerly. Subang International Airport). Both airports have international connections, but Sultan Abdul Aziz Shah Airport is solely for turboprop aircraft and private jets only. Kuala Lumpur International Airport apart from being the main passenger gateway, it is also the main cargo destination in Malaysia by cargo traffic. Kuala Lumpur International Airport is linked to the city centre by KLIA Ekspres by railway, major expressways, and bus service. Subang Airport, meanwhile, is well connected by road networks and bus service.

Kuala Lumpur International Airport (KLIA) is capable of handling 35 million passengers and 1.2 million tonnes of cargo a year in its current phase. It is currently ranked as the 13th busiest airport in the world by international passenger traffic where it has handled 24,129,748 passengers in the year 2006. In the same year, it is also ranked 30th busiest airport in the world by cargo traffic where it has handled 677 446 metric tonnes of cargo. Kuala Lumpur International Airport is one of the only few airports in East Asia to have links to South America, where Malaysia Airlines, has flights out of Kuala Lumpur International Airport to Buenos Aires via Johannesburg and Cape Town.

Both airports are operated by Malaysia Airports and are the hub for Malaysia Airlines, Malaysia Airlines Cargo, AirAsia and AirAsia X in Kuala Lumpur International Airport and Firefly, Transmile Air Services and Berjaya Air in Subang Airport. Moreover, KLIA is also the stopover point for the kangaroo route for Malaysia Airlines.

== Ports ==
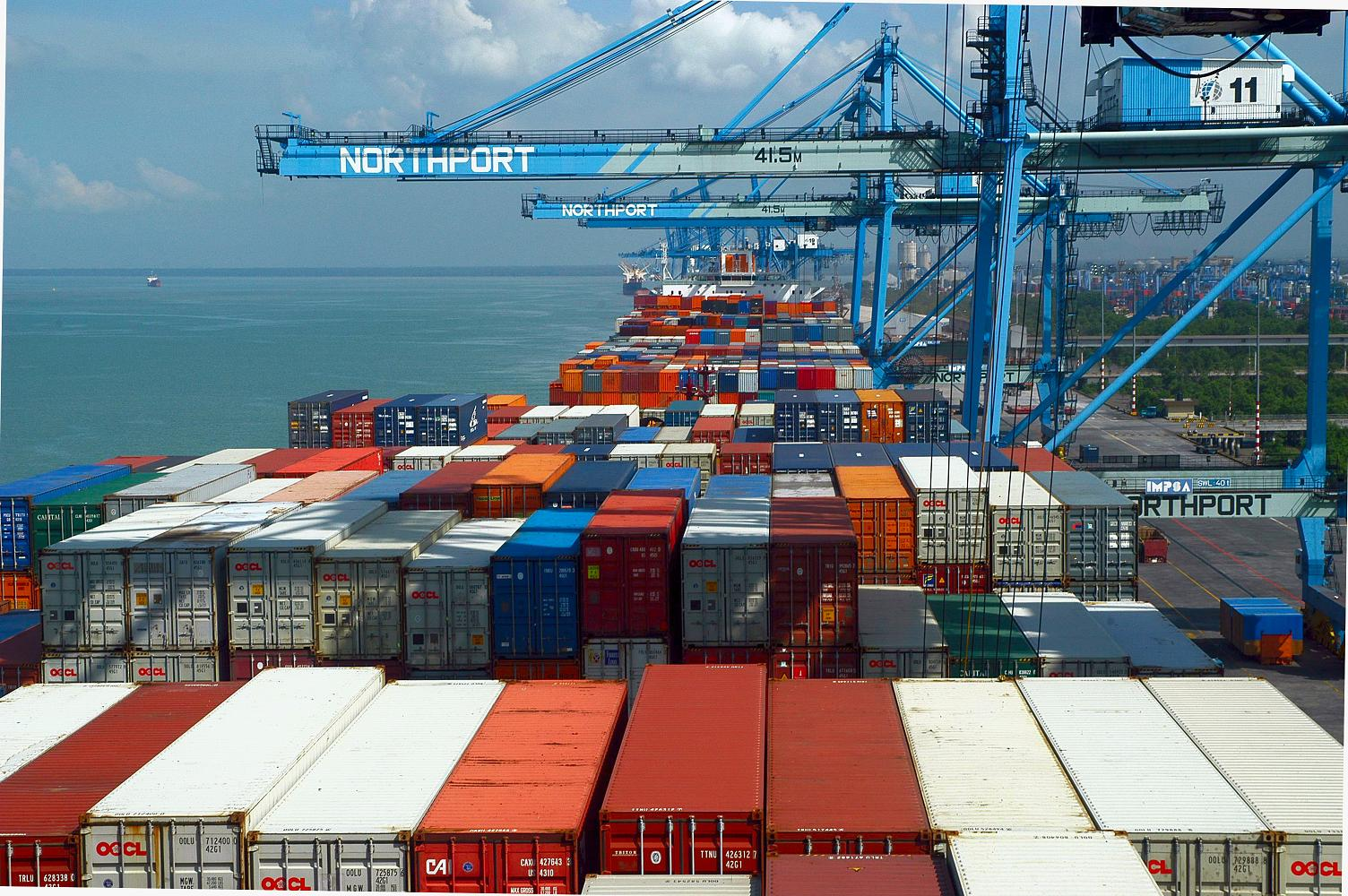
Quay Cranes at Northport

Container ship docking at one of Port Klang's Berth

Port Klang is one of the main sea ports of Malaysia, located in the district of Klang in the state of Selangor. It serves the Klang Valley, including the federal capital Kuala Lumpur and federal administrative capital Putrajaya.

Port Klang was originally known as Port Swettenham when it was founded under British colonial rule in 1893, after the then British Resident High Commissioner for the Malay State, Sir Frank Swettenham. The official opening of the port was on 15 September 1901, which developed as a new port after a study found that its coastal area had a harbour with deep anchorage, free from dangers, and very suitable for wharves. Its development was accelerated further with the extension of a railway line from Kuala Lumpur to the new port. The Port Klang Authority, established 1 July 1963, administers the three ports in the Port Klang area: Northport, Southpoint and West Port. As of November 2007, West Port, part of the three ports in Port Klang, has handled 4 million twenty-foot equivalent units (TEU) worth of containerised cargo, and is moving towards its 4.3 millionth TEU by end of 2007. Together with North port and South port, Port Klang handled 7.12 million TEU of containerised cargo and 133.5 million tonnes of conventional cargo in 2007.

Apart from cargo ships, Port Klang also features a cruise ship terminal in Westport where SuperStar Virgo and Queen Mary 2, the world's second-largest passenger ship has docked in the terminal for an excursion. Port Klang is also the home port of call for SuperStar Gemini.

Port Klang has its free zone, called Port Klang Free Zone (PKFZ). It is an integrated 1,000-acre (4.0 km^{2}) international cargo distribution and consolidation centre situated in Port Klang, the world's 13th-ranked port in 2005 in terms of throughput volume. The PKFZ is designed to promote entrepot trade and manufacturing industries involved in producing goods primarily for export. In 2007, PKFZ Authority has secured US$220 million and projected to secure another US$184 million in 2008. The project is similar to Dubai's Jebel Ali Free Zone, which previously PKFZ is managed by Jebel Ali Free Zone Authority (JAFZA).

Port Klang is well connected by road and railway networks. On the rail, Port Klang is connected by Keretapi Tanah Melayu, whereas by road, Port Klang is connected by Federal Highway and Shah Alam Expressway

== Recent efforts ==
Recent efforts on urban transportation design address both the functional and aesthetic aspects of the city's built environment. The Kuala Lumpur Structure Plan 2020 particularly cites good transportation linkage as essential factors to the success of the city, noting that public transportation would enable greater flexibility and movement. For the residents of Kuala Lumpur, it is important to provide a transportation structure that allows members of the community to equal accessibility. The KLCH recognizes “low public transport modal share” as the key problem to high demands on road infrastructure and traffic congestion.

To increase public transportation usage, KLCH is currently expanding and constructing the Mass Rapid Transit lines that would provide more coverage to areas within the conurbation. Additional attention to the design of the newest public transport facilities is made to accommodate individuals with special needs. Also, to avoid traffic congestion occurring on local streets, major bus and rail interchange stops will be strategically located at points of intersections of major roads. Recent studies also show that people of Klang Valley are willing to use public transport system if it is efficient and comfortable However, this shift is highly impacted by peers pressure (subjective norm).

On 18 June 2020, Rapid KL's subsidiary Rapid Bus released new features on real time locations of bus in Google Maps, via collaboration with Google Transit. Almost 170 Rapid KL's bus routes are covered with this real time feature. Rapid Bus also plans to expand the application to MRT feeder bus service, Rapid Penang, and Rapid Kuantan in the future.

== Future projects ==
=== Plaza Rakyat ===
Plaza Rakyat is a mixed-use skyscraper complex initiated during the 1990s that was to be completed but was halted due to the 1997 Asian financial crisis. The building was intended to replace Puduraya bus depot and also to provide better connectivity to Ampang Line's Plaza Rakyat LRT station. Minor demolition works on the abandoned site started back in 2020 and currently being revived by Kuala Lumpur City Hall.

=== Multi Lane Free Flow ===
By 2008, expressways in Kuala Lumpur will introduce Multi-Lane Free Flow system similar to SmartTAG. Under the Multi-Lane Free Flow, which is similar to the system used extensively in Europe, the United States, Australia, Canada and Singapore, the toll charges will be deducted electronically as vehicles beating special tags pass through the plazas normal driving speeds as fast as 180 km/h (110 mph), as there will be no barriers. Trails of the system is expected to be run starting November 2008 with the Sungai Pencala Toll Plaza on the Damansara–Puchong Expressway(LDP) as the test site. Shah Alam toll plaza as also been selected as a new test site for the system beginning December 2008.|This system will implement in 2010 by stages.

=== Bandar Tasik Selatan integrated transport hub ===
The Bandar Tasik Selatan station will be upgraded to an integrated transport hub. It is expected to serve buses coming from the south of Kuala Lumpur. Construction has started since November 2007 and expected to complete by 2010. Currently, the station serves Ampang Line, Rawang-Seremban Route of the KTM Komuter and KLIA Ekspres line.

== See also ==
- Transport in Malaysia
- Kuala Lumpur–Singapore High Speed Rail
- Kuala Lumpur Mini-Bus Service
- List of bus routes in Greater Kuala Lumpur
