= Rail transport in Malaysia =

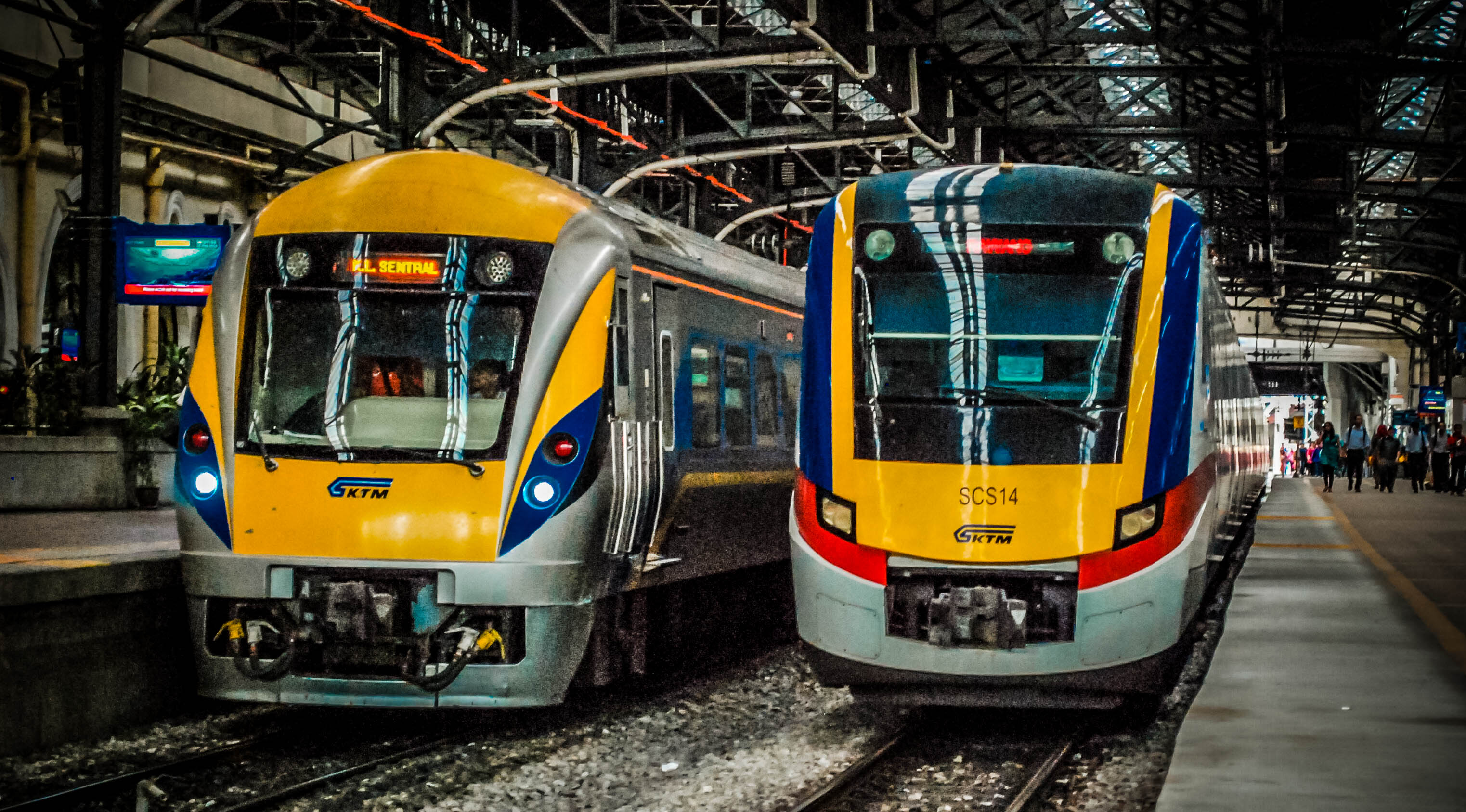
- Class 91 of KTM ETS for Intercity Express and Class 92 of KTM Komuter at Kuala Lumpur Railway Station

Operation
- Infrastructure company: Railway Assets Corporation, MRT Corp, Prasarana Malaysia, Express Rail Link, State Government of Sabah
- Major operators: Peninsular Malaysia: Keretapi Tanah Melayu, Rapid Rail, Express Rail Link; East Malaysia: Sabah State Railway

Statistics
- Ridership: 364,778,311 (2025)
- Freight: 5,767,000 tonnes (2025)

System length
- Total: Total: 2,049.8 km (1,273.7 mi); Suburban: KTM: 1,789 km (1,112 mi), ERL: 57 km (35 mi), JKNS: 134 km (83 mi); Metro: MRT: 103.7 km (64.4 mi), LRT: 91.5 km (56.9 mi), Monorail: 8.6 km (5.3 mi)
- Double track: Total: 1,203.7 km (747.9 mi); Suburban: 839 km (521 mi); Metro: 203.8 km (126.6 mi)
- Electrified: 1,203.7 km (747.9 mi)

Track gauge
- Main: 1,000 mm (3 ft 3 3/8 in); 1,435 mm (4 ft 8 1/2 in)
- Metre gauge: 1,789 km (1,112 mi)
- Standard gauge: 252.2 km (156.7 mi)
- Straddle beam monorail: 8.6 km (5.3 mi)

Features
- Tunnel length: 3,300 m (10,800 ft)
- Longest tunnel: Bukit Berapit Rail Tunnel
- No. of stations: Total: 350; Suburban: KTM: 188 (include halts), ERL: 6, JKNS: 15; Metro: MRT: 65, LRT: 73, Monorail: 11
- Max elevation: 185 m (607 ft) at Tenom
- Min elevation: 4 m (13 ft) at Port Klang
Map

Rail transport in Malaysia has evolved significantly since its inception in the late 19th century, reflecting the country's economic growth and modernization.

The development of Malaysia's railways, from the first tracks laid for transporting tin to the extensive network that exists today, mirrors the broader social and economic transformations that have shaped the nation. This narrative explores the key milestones in the history of Malaysian rail transport, consists of primarily of passenger and freight shipments along an integrated rail network. Keretapi Tanah Melayu (KTM), a Government-owned company under the ownership of the Minister of Finance (Incorporated) of the Government of Malaysia, operates Malaysia's national railway system. It is the primary operator of rail operations throughout the country including inter-city rail and commuter/suburban rail in major metropolitan areas.

The urban transit systems operated by independent bodies constituted for the purpose of the respective operations such as light rapid transit (LRT), mass rapid transit (MRT) and only-functioning monorail.

There is only one functioning airport rail link system, which links Kuala Lumpur, Malaysia's capital city with the Kuala Lumpur International Airport (KLIA), while the Penang Hill Railway is the only operational funicular system in the country. Private owned rails exist in few places, mostly used to connect freight to the integrated rail network.

The railway network covers most of the 11 states in Peninsular Malaysia, with the exception of Terengganu. In East Malaysia, only the state of Sabah has a rail network, which is operated by Sabah State Railway. The Malaysian rail network is also connected to the State Railway of Thailand 1,000 mm (3 ft 3 3/8 in) network in the north. If the Burma Railway is rebuilt, services to Myanmar, India, and China could be initiated.

== History ==
=== The birth of railways (1885-1891) ===
Rail transport in Malaysia began with the first railway line operated in 1885, connecting Taiping to Port Weld (now known as Kuala Sepetang). This 13.5-kilometer line was developed to transport tin from the mines in Taiping, one of the world's most important tin mining areas at the time, to the port for export. The success of this initial line laid the groundwork for the expansion of rail transport in Malaya.

In 1886, the line was extended to connect the tin-rich area of Larut, further boosting the region's economy by providing an efficient means of transporting tin to the port. The early railways were primarily driven by the needs of the tin mining industry, which was the backbone of Malaya's economy in the late 19th century.

=== Expansion and consolidation (1891-1910) ===
The late 19th and early 20th centuries saw significant expansion of the railway network in British Malaya. In 1891, a major line was constructed between Klang and Kuala Lumpur, connecting the inland commercial center to the coastal port. This line was pivotal in facilitating the export of goods, particularly tin and rubber, which were central to Malaya's economy at the time.

As the rail network grew, the need for centralized management became apparent. In 1910, the Federated Malay States Railways (FMSR) was established, consolidating various regional rail systems under one administration. This unification allowed for more coordinated planning and development, setting the stage for the creation of major rail lines that would form the backbone of the national network.

=== Development of major rail lines (1910-1931) ===
Under the FMSR, two major rail lines were developed: the West Coast Line and the East Coast Line.

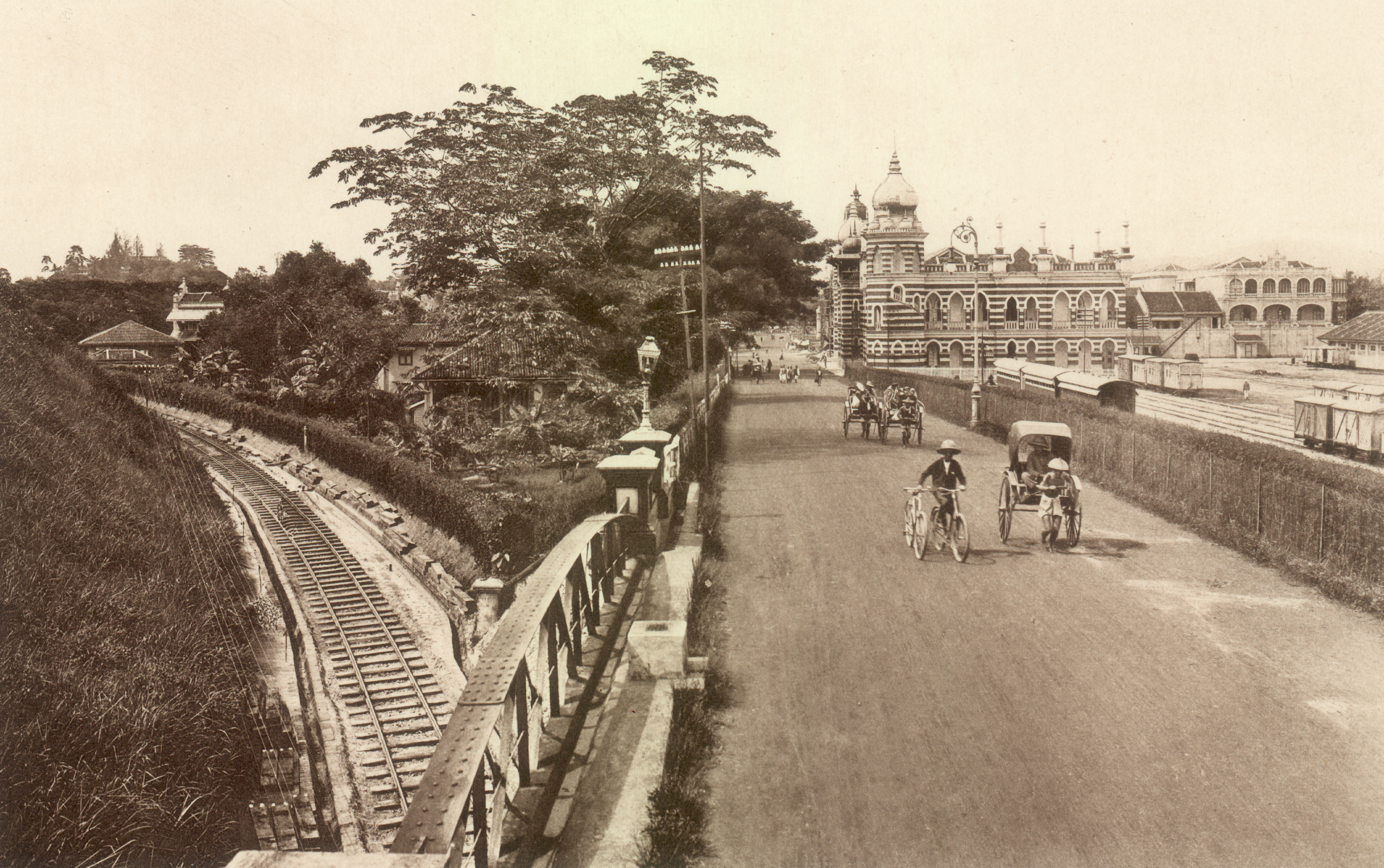
Headquarters of the F.M.S. Railways at Kuala Lumpur - circa 1910. The headquarters was later moved to a building opposite Kuala Lumpur Railway Station. Railway line heading north from Kuala Lumpur on left, railway sidings on right.

Railways in Malaysia began because of the need to transport tin from mines in the hinterland of the West Coast states of Peninsular Malaysia to coastal ports. The first railway line, which was opened on 1 June 1885, was about 13 km long and ran between Port Weld and Taiping, the heart of the tin-rich Larut Valley in Perak state. The second line was opened a year later to link Kuala Lumpur, again the center of tin-mining activities in the Klang Valley, and Klang and subsequently to Port Swettenham (Port Klang) today.

The West Coast Line, completed in 1923, ran from Padang Besar near the Thai border in the north to Tanjong Pagar in Singapore in the south. This line was crucial in linking the major cities along the west coast, including Penang, Ipoh, Kuala Lumpur, and Johor Bahru. It became the primary route for the transportation of goods and passengers, playing a key role in the economic integration of the region.

The East Coast Line, completed in 1931, branches of the West Coast Line at Gemas in Negeri Sembilan to Tumpat in Kelantan. This line opened up the east coast, which was less developed compared to the west, by providing a reliable means of transportation for agricultural products, particularly rubber and palm oil, to markets on the west coast and beyond.

=== Challenges during the Malayan Emergency (1948-1960) ===
The Malayan Emergency posed significant challenges to the rail network. The communist insurgency targeted the railways as they were seen as symbols of colonial power and were crucial for British military logistics. Sabotage and attacks on trains and infrastructure caused disruptions, but the rail network remained operational and played a vital role in the British efforts to maintain control during the conflict.

=== Post-Independence modernization (1963-1989) ===
With Malaysia's independence in 1957 and the subsequent formation of Malaysia in 1963, the nation's railways entered a new phase of development. The rail networks in Peninsular Malaysia, Sabah, and Sarawak were brought under the administration of Keretapi Tanah Melayu (KTM), allowing for more unified management and planning.

In the early 1960s, rail transport was still the primary mode of long-distance travel within Peninsular Malaysia. However, with the rapid expansion of road networks and the rise of automobile ownership, the railways began to face increasing competition. To remain relevant, KTM initiated several modernization projects aimed at improving service efficiency and passenger comfort.

A significant milestone during this period was the introduction of inter-city rail services with brand KTM Intercity in 1989. This was a significant development in Malaysia's rail transport history, as it expanded the range of long-distance travel options available across Peninsular Malaysia.

KTM Intercity's services have long been a vital part of Malaysia's rail network, providing long-distance travel options across Peninsular Malaysia. These services connected major cities and towns, offering a reliable and affordable means of transportation for millions of Malaysians.

One of the most iconic trains in KTM Intercity's fleet was the Senandung Malam Express. This overnight service connected Kuala Lumpur with cities such as Butterworth, Padang Besar, and Hat Yai in southern Thailand. The Senandung Malam Express was particularly popular for its overnight travel option, allowing passengers to travel long distances while sleeping, and arrive at their destination refreshed the next morning.

Other notable KTM Intercity services included the Ekspres Rakyat, which ran between Johor Bahru and Butterworth, and the Ekspres Wau, connecting Kuala Lumpur with Tumpat in Kelantan. These services were known for their scenic routes, passing through lush landscapes and offering a unique travel experience.

In Sabah, the Sabah State Railway (SSR) operated a separate network, primarily serving the western coastal regions from Kota Kinabalu to Tenom. Built during the British North Borneo era, this narrow-gauge railway played a crucial role in connecting remote areas with the state capital and was vital for the transportation of goods and passengers in the region.

One of the key developments during this period was the electrification of the rail network in the Klang Valley, which began in 1989. The electrification marked the start of a transition from diesel-powered to electric trains, significantly improving travel times, efficiency, and capacity in the rapidly urbanizing region. This modernisation laid the groundwork for the introduction of commuter rail services, which would become increasingly important in the following decades.

=== Introduction of modern commuter services and urban transit (1995-2023) ===
The mid-1990s marked the beginning of a new era in Malaysian rail transport, with the introduction of modern commuter services and urban transit systems.

In 1995, KTM launched its commuter rail service, the first electric commuter train service in Malaysia branding as KTM Komuter. Initially serving the Klang Valley for the central sector which currently consist of the Batu Caves–Pulau Sebang Line, Tanjung Malim–Port Klang Line and KL Sentral–Terminal Skypark Line, KTM Komuter quickly became an essential part of the region's public transportation network, offering a reliable alternative to the congested roads. The service was later expanded to include the northern sector, connecting cities such as Butterworth, Padang Besar, and Ipoh to the larger network, enhancing connectivity and convenience for residents and travelers alike.

Urban rail transit also saw significant advancements with the introduction of two light rapid transit (LRT) systems in the Klang Valley. The Ampang Line and Sri Petaling Line (formerly STAR LRT) opened in 1996, followed by the Kelana Jaya Line (formerly PUTRA LRT) in 1998. These lines provided a much-needed solution to the increasing traffic congestion in the Klang Valley, offering fast and efficient connections between key urban centers. In 2010, the Klang Valley Mass Rapid Transit project was iniated which introduced two new mass rapid transit (MRT) lines to the Klang Valley, the Kajang Line in 2017 and Putrajaya Line in 2023. All five LRT and MRT lines, as well the KL Monorail which was opened in 2003, operate under a single metro system known as Rapid KL.

The modernization of the Sabah State Railway (SSR) began in the early 2000s, addressing the need to upgrade the aging narrow-gauge tracks and rolling stock. These efforts were crucial for improving safety, reliability, and passenger comfort, particularly on the line connecting Kota Kinabalu to Tenom. The modernization project included the refurbishment of stations, the introduction of new trains, and significant improvements to the infrastructure. The SSR modernization is ongoing, with plans to further enhance the network by extending the line to other parts of Sabah, thereby improving connectivity and supporting the state's economic development. This project is vital for ensuring that the SSR continues to serve as a key transportation link in Sabah, particularly in the more remote regions of the state.

In 2002, the Express Rail Link (ERL) was introduced, providing high-speed connectivity between Kuala Lumpur and the Kuala Lumpur International Airport (KLIA). The ERL's KLIA Express service reduced travel time between the city and the airport to just 28 minutes, significantly improving access to the country's main gateway for international travelers.

The early 2000s also saw the double-tracking and electrification of existing West Coast railway line, which paved the way for the introduction of the KTM ETS (Electric Train Service) in 2010. The KTM ETS offered high-speed rail services between major cities, including Kuala Lumpur, Ipoh, and Penang, providing a comfortable and efficient alternative to road and air travel. This has since been expanded southwards to Gemas and Johor Bahru.

Following the 2008 Penang state election that saw Pakatan Rakyat (predecessor of the present-day the Pakatan Harapan coalition) gaining control of the Penang State Legislative Assembly, the Penang state government conceived the multimodal Penang Transport Master Plan (PTMP), which includes the introduction of urban rail systems across the state. In 2015, as part of the PTMP, the state government announced a proposed RM10 billion light rapid transit (LRT) line to link downtown George Town with the Penang International Airport. However, planning was carried out independently from the federal government, creating political tensions that ultimately delayed the PTMP's implementation, as transport infrastructure falls under the federal Ministry of Transport's jurisdiction.

=== Ongoing projects (2023-present) ===
Malaysia's rail transport continues to expand and modernize, with several significant projects currently underway or in planning stages.

One of the most ambitious projects is the East Coast Rail Link (ECRL), which began construction in 2017. The ECRL aims to connect the East Coast region of Peninsular Malaysia with the more developed West Coast, running from Kota Bharu in Kelantan to Port Klang in Selangor. This project is expected to reduce travel times, boost economic development in the east coast states, and improve the overall efficiency of Malaysia's rail network. This project will also see the introduction of rail services to Terengganu.

The Klang Valley continues to see expansions with the recent completion of the third LRT system and fourth LRT line, the Shah Alam Line, set to connect Bandar Utama to Klang and Shah Alam. The LRT line serves densely populated areas, providing an alternative to road transport and enhancing the region's public transportation network.

Another major project in the planning stages is the Circle Line, the third MRT line and final phase of the Klang Valley Mass Rapid Transit Project, which will form a loop around Kuala Lumpur, connecting existing MRT, LRT, monorail and KTM lines. Once completed, the MRT line will significantly enhance connectivity within the Klang Valley, offering more convenient and efficient travel options for residents and visitors. The land acquisition phase has concluded, and construction is scheduled to start in 2027.

The proposed LRT line between downtown George Town, the Penang International Airport and Silicon Island was granted federal approval in 2019. However, due to protracted political infighting, the project, now renamed the LRT Mutiara Line, only secured federal funding in 2023. The LRT line was redesigned to include an extension between George Town and Penang Sentral in Seberang Perai. Construction of the LRT line commenced in 2025 and is expected to be completed by 2031.

The Johor Bahru–Singapore Rapid Transit System (RTS) project is another key development, set to provide a crucial link between Johor Bahru and Singapore. Expected to be completed by January 2027, the RTS will ease congestion on the Causeway and provide a fast, efficient cross-border commuting option for thousands of daily travelers. This will eventually replace KTM Intercity's Shuttle Tebrau service, marking the full withdrawal of KTM from Singapore.

Meanwhile, ongoing double-tracking and electrification projects in the southern part of Peninsular Malaysia are expected to enhance the efficiency and capacity of the national rail network, particularly for intercity rail travel and freight rail services.

Despite the expansion of railways in this period, there was no substantial modal shift towards rail travel and away from cars. This may be a result of continued fuel subsidies and parking incentivising driving, and a disconnect between railway development and last mile transportation issues.

== Networks ==
=== List of systems ===
As of 1 July 2026

Under construction

| Region | Line(s) | Operator | Length (km) | Track Gauge | No. of tracks | Electrified | Signalling | Opening |
|---|---|---|---|---|---|---|---|---|
| Peninsular Malaysia | West Coast Line (with 6 branch lines) | KTM | 756.8 | 1,000 mm (3 ft 3 3/8 in) | 2 | 25 kV 50 Hz AC overhead catenary | | 1885 |
| Peninsular Malaysia | East Coast Line (with 1 branch line) | KTM | | 1,000 mm (3 ft 3 3/8 in) | 1 | no | | 1896 |
| Peninsular Malaysia | Ampang Line and Sri Petaling Line | Rapid Rail | 45.1 | 1,435 mm (4 ft 8 1/2 in) | 2 | 750 V DC third rail | Thales SelTrac CBTC & AlTrac ETCS L1 | 1996 |
| Peninsular Malaysia | Kelana Jaya Line | Rapid Rail | 46.4 | 1,435 mm (4 ft 8 1/2 in) | 2 | 750 V DC third rail | Thales SelTrac CBTC & AlTrac ETCS L1 | 1998 |
| Peninsular Malaysia | Express Rail Link | | 57 | 1,435 mm (4 ft 8 1/2 in) | 2 | 25 kV 50 Hz AC overhead catenary | | 2002 |
| Peninsular Malaysia | KL Monorail | Rapid Rail | 8.6 | Straddle-beam | 2 | 750 V DC third rail | Thales SelTrac CBTC & AlTrac ETCS L1 | 2003 |
| Peninsular Malaysia | Putrajaya Line | Rapid Rail | 57.7 | 1,435 mm (4 ft 8 1/2 in) | 2 | 750 V DC third rail | Cityflo 650 CBTC | 2022 |
| Peninsular Malaysia | Kajang Line | Rapid Rail | 47 | 1,435 mm (4 ft 8 1/2 in) | 2 | 750 V DC third rail | Cityflo 650 CBTC | 2016 |
| Peninsular Malaysia | Shah Alam Line | Rapid Rail | 37.8 | 1,435 mm (4 ft 8 1/2 in) | 2 | 750 V DC third rail | Trainguard MT | 2026 |
| Peninsular Malaysia | RTS Link | RTS Operations (Note: Joint venture of Prasarana and SMRT Corporation) | 4 | 1,435 mm (4 ft 8 1/2 in) | 2 | 750 V DC third rail | | 2027 |
| Peninsular Malaysia | East Coast Rail Link | MRL / CCCC | 665 | 1,435 mm (4 ft 8 1/2 in) | 2 | 25 kV 50 Hz AC Overhead line | CTCS-2 | 2027 |
| Peninsular Malaysia | Mutiara Line | MRTC | 29.5 | 1,435 mm (4 ft 8 1/2 in) | 2 | 750 V DC third rail | | 2031 |
| Sabah | West Sabah Line | Sabah State Railway | 134 | 1,000 mm (3 ft 3 3/8 in) | 1 | no | | 1896 |

==== Peninsular Malaysia ====
Evolution of Malayan Railway from 1890 to 2023

There are two primary railway networks in Peninsular Malaysia: The KTM West Coast railway line, which runs from Padang Besar in Perlis where it connects with Thailand’s railway network, to the Woodlands Train Checkpoint in Singapore, as well as the KTM East Coast railway line between Gemas in Negeri Sembilan and Tumpat in Kelantan. Within the West Coast Line lies several branch lines, which include railways from Kuala Lumpur to Port Klang, Subang Jaya to the Sultan Abdul Aziz Shah Airport, Sentul to Batu Caves, Bukit Mertajam to Butterworth, Kempas to Tanjung Pelepas and Kempas to Pasir Gudang. The entire 1,776 km network uses 1,000 mm (3 ft 3 3/8 in) metre gauge tracks, and uses a ballasted setup with locally manufactured concrete sleepers. Since the early 1980s, companies formed via international collaboration, such as Mastrak Sdn Bhd had been producing these sleepers via technology transfer. In the five years period of 1982-1987 alone, it was estimated that around 500,000 pieces of concrete sleepers had been laid down for the Kerdau-Jerantut and Sungai Yu-Tumpat lines.

Currently, a total of 962 km from the 1,776 km railway network is double-tracked and electrified. This includes almost the entire main West Coast Line between Padang Besar and JB Sentral (except for the JB Sentral-Woodlands section), as well as the branch lines to Port Klang, Batu Caves and Butterworth. The rail lines from Tanjung Malim to Pulau Sebang/Tampin, Padang Besar to Ipoh as well as the Port Klang, Batu Caves and Butterworth branch lines are used for KTM Komuter commuter rail services.

Efforts in retrofitting the old tracks were done under the Electrification and Double Tracking Project (EDTP) orchestrated by the Minister of Transport. The first EDTP was done from Rawang to Ipoh from 2001 to 2009, stretching 179 km while the second EDTP was done from Seremban to Gemas and was completed in 2013. The third EDTP was done from Ipoh to Padang Besar at a length of 329 km from January 2008 to November 2014. There were also smaller scale EDTPs initiated in branch lines, such as the 7.2 km Batu Caves branch line, which was completed in 2010. The fourth and final EDTP of the West Coast Line, which will see the complete electrification and double tracking of the portion of the line used for passenger services, was done from Gemas to JB Sentral and was completed in 2025.

Malaysia's national petroleum company, Petronas, had once built and operated a single-track 75 km Kerteh–Kuantan Port railway line starting 1 April 2004. Despite this, the railway system was of poor quality and locomotives had to operate well below the designated speed. On 17 November 2010, the railway was eventually closed due to a number of recurring technical problems on the railway system such as drainage problems, improper slope protection and alleged usage of weak fill material within the embankment slope.

==== Borneo ====
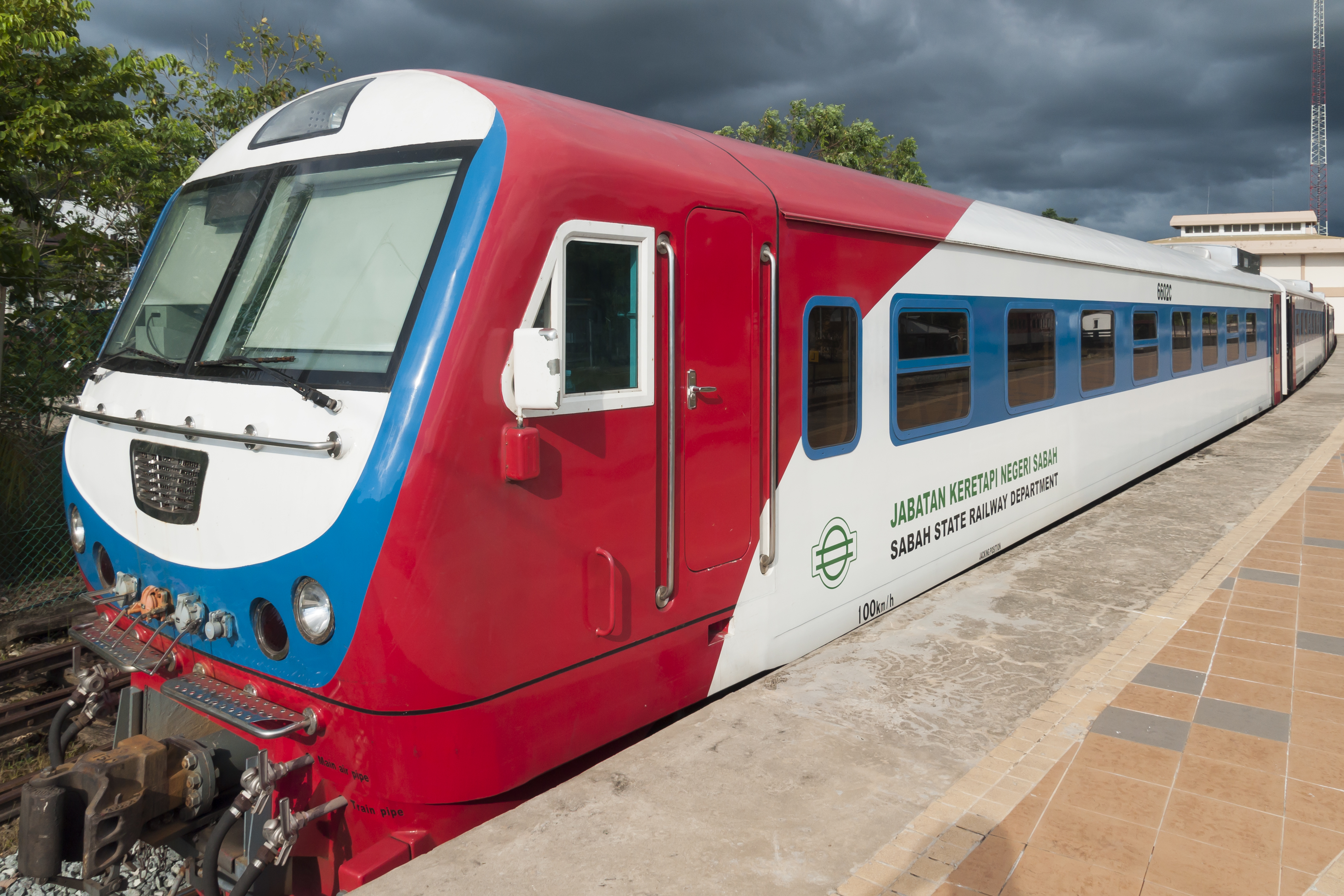
The Sabah State Railway

The only railway network present on the island of Borneo is the 134 km (83 mi) railway line in Sabah, linking Tanjung Aru in Kota Kinabalu, and Tenom in the Interior Division. It is operated by the Sabah State Railway and has 15 stations. Efforts of modernisation were undertaken from 2006 to 2011 and as widespread usage of concrete sleepers becomes apparent in the Malaysian Peninsula, the Sabah State Railway had also installed these sleepers for their railway network.

=== Projects and Expansion Plans ===
==== West Coast Line Electrification and Double Tracking (EDTP) ====
The first electrified railway section of the West Coast Line was opened in 1995 with the introduction of KTM Komuter. Since then, KTM has embarked on several EDTPs along the entire West Coast Line, with the most recent being the stretch between Gemas and JB Sentral. As of 12 December 2025, the all portions of West Coast Line from Padang Besar-JB Sentral as well as several branch lines that are used for regular passenger service have been completed.

==== Klang Valley Double Track (KVDT) Project ====
The project was implemented by KTM to rehabilitate and upgrade the signalling system, electrification and tracks of the railway in the Klang Valley region, which are the oldest double-tracked and electrified railway in the country. The project began in 2016. Phase 1 of the KVDT, which entails the rehabilitation of 42 km of tracks between Rawang and Salak Selatan, as well as between Sentul and Batu Junction, while projected to be completed in 2021, was only completed in 2025. It was projected that once complete, train frequencies will be reduced to just seven-and-a-half minutes.

Phase II of the KVDT, which began in 2023, will cover the sections from Port Klang/Bangsar Junction to Port Klang, and from Salak Selatan to Seremban. It is projected to be completed by 2027, ahead of the initial target of 2029.

==== Kempas Baru–Pasir Gudang passenger service line ====
On 9 May 2025, it was announced that the cargo-only Kempas Baru–Pasir Gudang railway line will soon be upgraded to accommodate passenger services. Passenger service along this line will primarily serve the high passengers flow expected from the upcoming Johor Bahru–Singapore RTS line in Johor Bahru, and is planned to be operational by 2026.

==== Penang Transport Master Plan ====
Introduced by the Penang state government in 2015, the Penang Transport Master Plan originally envisaged seven public transport corridors. Of the seven corridors, the LRT Mutiara Line was given the highest priority to ease vehicular traffic volume along the downtown George Town-Bayan Lepas corridor, which reached 64,144 vehicles in 2018. The 29 km (18 mi) line is the first domestic light rapid transit (LRT) system outside the Klang Valley, comprising 22 stations between Penang Sentral in Seberang Perai, downtown George Town, Bayan Lepas and Silicon Island.

The Mutiara Line received conditional approval from federal government environmental regulators in 2019. Due to political infighting, construction could not begin until 2025 when the Anwar Ibrahim administration took over the LRT project. The line is expected to be operational by 2031.

==== East Coast Rail Link ====
The upcoming East Coast Rail Link

The East Coast Rail Link (ECRL) is a standard gauge, single-track on double placement railway link infrastructure project connecting Port Klang on the Straits of Malacca to Kota Bharu in northeast Peninsular Malaysia via Serendah, Gombak and the states of Pahang and Terengganu, connecting the East Coast Economic Region states of Pahang, Terengganu and Kelantan to one another, and to the Central Region of the Peninsular Malaysia's west coast. The project was proposed to provide higher speed inter-city rail service to the east coast states and to complement the single track non-electrified KTM East Coast Line. Currently, Terengganu is the only state in Peninsular Malaysia without a passenger railway system, as the KTM East Coast Line only serves Pahang and Kelantan. The railway is expected to begin operations in January 2027.

==== Johor Bahru-Singapore Rapid Transit System ====
The Johor Bahru-Singapore Rapid Transit System (RTS Link) is an under-construction cross-border rapid transit system that will connect Woodlands, Singapore and Johor Bahru, Malaysia, crossing the Straits of Johor.

The rapid transit system will have two stations, with the Singaporean terminus located at Woodlands North station (interchanging with the Singapore MRT system) and the Malaysia terminus at Bukit Chagar station (interchange with the proposed Iskandar Malaysia BRT system). Both stations will have co-located Singaporean and Malaysian customs, immigration and quarantine facilities.

When built, the RTS Link will be the second rail link between the two countries after KTM Intercity's Shuttle Tebrau service on the last remaining KTM railway in Singapore between JB Sentral and the Woodlands Train Checkpoint, and the first high-capacity international metro system to be built. The RTS Link is expected to replace the railway line and shuttle train services between, completing the withdrawal of KTM operations from Singapore.

==== Klang Valley Light Rapid Transit (LRT) 3rd System ====
A third LRT system was completed in 2026, linking the city centre with the cities of Shah Alam and Klang. The line, which spans 37.8 km, has 20 stations with another 6 under construction, planning to begin operations by 2031. It is the first line in the Klang Valley Integrated Transit System to be situated completely outside the borders of Kuala Lumpur.

==== Klang Valley Mass Rapid Transit (MRT) 3rd Line ====
The Klang Valley Mass Rapid Transit (KVMRT) project is a proposed three-line 150 km MRT system by Gamuda-MMC Corporation Berhad for the Klang Valley which envisages a "Wheel and Spoke" concept comprising two northeast–southwest radial lines and one circle line looping around Kuala Lumpur. The proposal was announced in early-June 2010 and construction works were targeted to commence in early 2011.

The MRT system will be owned by the Government of Malaysia through the Mass Rapid Transit Corporation (MRT Corp), a special purpose vehicle which is 100% owned by the Minister of Finance (Incorporated). The three lines will be operated by Rapid Rail, which is the current operator of the Klang Valley's existing LRT and monorail lines, under its integrated Rapid KL brand and fare system.

The first MRT line, the Kajang Line was fully operational by July 2017. The second MRT line, the Putrajaya Line was completed and fully operational by March 2023. Both the Kajang and Putrajaya lines form the "Spoke" component of the KVMRT project.

The third MRT line, the Circle Line, is the "Wheel" component of the MRT project. The line was recently approved by the Cabinet and is currently awaiting the tendering process. It is projected that the Circle Line will be fully operational in 2032.

==== Sarawak rail transportation projects ====
Terengganu and Sarawak are the only two states in Malaysia that do not have railway infrastructure. In Sarawak, a railway line existed before the Second World War, but the last remnants of the line were dismantled in 1959.

As part of Sarawak Corridor of Renewable Energy project, the government is planning a 320 km railway track between Similajau in Bintulu Division and Tanjung Manis in Mukah Division. The cost and plans for the project timeline is yet to be revealed.

Another railway line, the Sarawak Railway Line is a proposed project by the Malaysian government to establishing a railway network in the state of Sarawak. In 2008, it was reported the project will be ready in 2015 but still no signs of development by the government until present. In 2026, the Bintulu-Samalaju Line was identified by the Sarawakian Government as the first phase of the state's development of rail. The line will be a component of the much larger Trans-Borneo Railway.

The Kuching LRT system was a proposed light rapid transit (LRT) system network in Kuching, the capital city of Sarawak. as one of the methods to ease traffic congestion in the city. The proposed LRT lines would have connected Kuching to nearby towns such as Samarahan and Serian. The construction of the RM10.8 billion project was expected to commence by 2019 and was scheduled to be operational by 2024, however, it was scrapped in favor of a more cost-affordable Autonomous Rapid Transit (ART) system which is currently under construction and is expected to begin operations by 2028 with 3 initial lines.

==== Sabah rail transportation projects ====
On 17 September 2015, it was announced that the Sabah State Railway will be extended to cover the northern and east coast areas, mainly to major towns of Kudat, Sandakan and Tawau. On 21 March 2017, around RM1 million has been allocated for the project study. Once the project is complete, there is also a proposal to connecting the rail networks of Sabah and Sarawak in Malaysia with the provinces of Kalimantan in Indonesia that will be called as Trans-Borneo Railway, as Indonesia were currently developing the railway network on their side.

A proposed monorail line project is to be constructed in the Kota Kinabalu area by the Sabah state government. The proposals generated mixed reactions between the mayor and politicians. As reported in the government website, the project was in the ground breaking process under the Kota Kinabalu development plan.

A new rapid transit line has also been proposed to ease traffic congestions in Kota Kinabalu, the capital of Sabah. On 27 August 2019, the Kota Kinabalu City Hall (DBKK) has submitted a proposal to build an LRT or MRT to the federal government. The city authorities are currently waiting for budget on the project.

In 2021, a skytrain system of Kota Kinabalu was proposed. The skytrain is planned to connect the Kota Kinabalu International Airport and Universiti Malaysia Sabah. Four companies which will be involved in the skytrain project signed a memorandum of understanding on 29 November. The skytrain will be built by phases, with phase 1 will be connecting the airport to the city centre, while phase 2 will extended till Alamesra, near the university.

== Express and passenger trains ==
=== Commuter rail ===
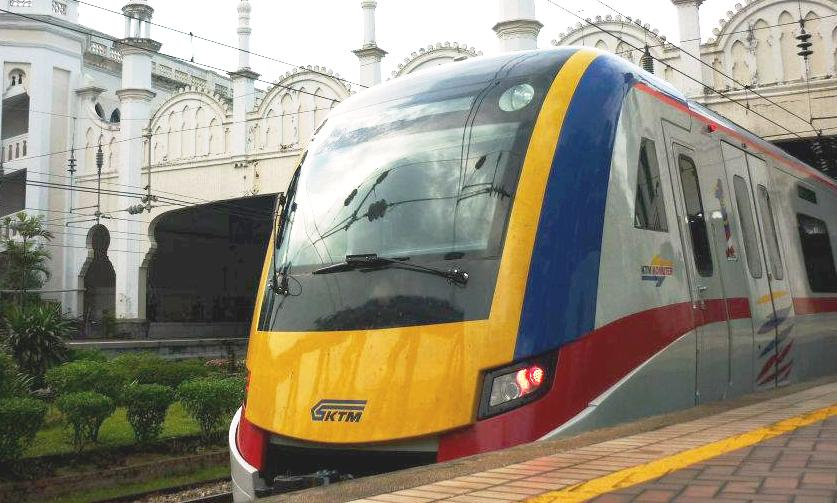
KTM Class 92 at Kuala Lumpur

Malaysia's commuter rail system plays a vital role in connecting urban centers with suburban and outlying regions, offering a reliable and efficient mode of transportation for millions of passengers. Two prominent services within the commuter rail network are the KTM Komuter, operated by Keretapi Tanah Melayu (KTM), and the Express Rail Link (ERL).

The KTM Komuter services primarily serve the Klang Valley (Central Sector) and the Greater Penang Conurbation (Northern Sector) regions with routes spanning over 280 km (170 mi), with more than 80 stations. The central sector consists of three routes, the Batu Caves–Pulau Sebang Line, Tanjung Malim–Port Klang Line and KL Sentral–Terminal Skypark Line. The KTM Komuter Northern Sector consists of two routes, namely the Butterworth-Ipoh Line and Padang Besar-Butterworth Line.

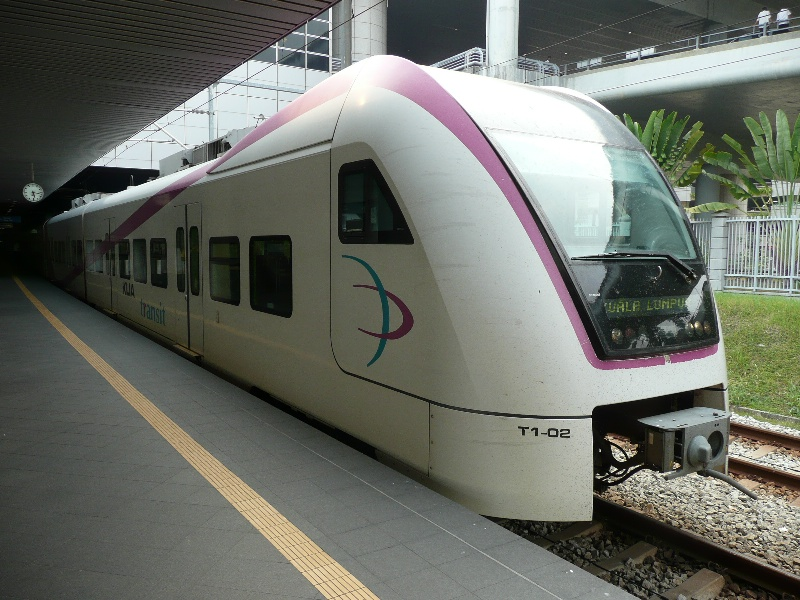
ERL KLIA Transit Line

The Express Rail Link (ERL) services are dedicated to providing fast and direct connections between Kuala Lumpur and the Kuala Lumpur International Airport's (KLIA) Terminal 1 and Terminal 2 that stretches 57 km (35 mi). The rail link currently has two services: The KLIA Ekspres serving three stations, and the KLIA Transit, serving six stations on the line.

The KLIA Ekspres is a non-stop express airport rail link service that connects KL Sentral, the main railway station of Kuala Lumpur, to KLIA's Terminal 1 and Terminal 2 stations. It offers the fastest way to travel between the city center and the airport, with a journey time of just 28 minutes. The service operates every 15 to 20 minutes during peak hours and is known for its punctuality and efficiency. On the other hand, the KLIA Transit shares the same tracks as KLIA Ekspres but includes additional stops at intermediate stations: Bandar Tasik Selatan, Putrajaya & Cyberjaya, and Salak Tinggi with a journey time from KL Sentral to KLIA Terminal 2 of approximately 39 minutes.

KTM Komuter's KL Sentral–Terminal Skypark Line also functions as an airport rail link, sharing most of its route with the Tanjung Malim–Port Klang Line from KL Sentral until Subang Jaya, where it branches off to Terminal Skypark, where it serves the Sultan Abdul Aziz Shah Airport (Subang Airport). Trains on the line only call at KL Sentral, Subang Jaya and Terminal Skypark.

==== Lines and systems ====
Suspended

| Sector | Line Code | Line Name | Length | Stations | Opened | Operator |
|---|---|---|---|---|---|---|
| Central | 1 | Batu Caves–Pulau Sebang Line | 135.6 km (84.3 mi) | 27 | 1995 | KTM |
| Central | 2 | Tanjung Malim–Port Klang Line | 127.5 km (79.2 mi) | 34 | 1995 | KTM |
| Central | 6 | KLIA Ekspres | 57 km (35 mi) | 3 | 2003 | ERL |
| Central | 7 | KLIA Transit | 57 km (35 mi) | 6 | 2003 | ERL |
| Central | 10 | KL Sentral–Terminal Skypark Line | 24.5 km (15.2 mi) | 3 | 2018 | KTM |
| Northern | 1 | Butterworth-Ipoh Line | 104 km (65 mi) | 13 | 2015 | KTM |
| Northern | 2 | Padang Besar-Butterworth Line | 169.8 km (105.5 mi) | 15 | 2016 | KTM |
| Southern | 1 | Paloh–JB Sentral Line | 110.1 km (68.4 mi) | 7 | 2026 | KTM |
| Southern | 2 | Kempas Baru–Pasir Gudang Line | 40 km (25 mi) | 2 | 2026 | KTM |

==== Fleet ====
| Service Brand | Line Code/Name | Formation | In service | Rolling stock | Image | Speed in service | Manufacturers |
|---|---|---|---|---|---|---|---|
| | 1 2 | 6 cars EMU and 3 cars EMU | 37 trainsets (222 cars) | CRRC Zhuzhou "KTM Class 92" | | 120 km (75 mi) | (China) CRRC Zhuzhou |
| | 1 2 | 6 cars EMU and 3 cars EMU | | Hyundai Mobis "KTM Class 83"; CRRC Zhuzhou "KTM Class 92" | | 100 km (62 mi); 120 km (75 mi) | (South Korea) Hyundai Mobis; (China) CRRC Zhuzhou |
| | 6 | 4 cars EMU | 8 trainsets (32 cars); 2 trainsets (8 cars) | Siemens Desiro ET 425 M; CRRC Changchun "Equator EMU" | | 160 km (99 mi) | (Germany) Siemens; (China) CRRC Changchun |
| | 7 | 4 cars EMU | 4 trainsets (16 cars); 4 trainsets (16 cars) | Siemens Desiro ET 425 M; CRRC Changchun "Equator EMU" | | 160 km (99 mi) | (Germany) Siemens; (China) CRRC Changchun |
| | 10 | 3 cars EMU | 4 trainsets (12 cars) | Hyundai Mobis "KTM Class 83"; Marubeni "KTM Class 83" | | 100 km (62 mi) | (South Korea) Hyundai Mobis; (Japan) Marubeni |

==== Ridership ====
Commuter Rail Ridership in Malaysia
| Year | KTM Komuter | KLIA Express | KLIA Transit | Total |
|---|---|---|---|---|
| 2025 | 16,647,676 | 2,103,920 | 7,210,129 | 25,961,725 |
| 2024 | 18,473,715 | 1,888,520 | 6,143,917 | 26,506,152 |
| 2023 | 18,130,770 | 1,440,773 | 5,143,373 | 24,714,916 |
| 2022 | 14,516,366 | 563,472 | 3,375,314 | 18,455,152 |
| 2021 | 5,898,884 | 53,434 | 724,997 | 6,677,315 |
| 2020 | 11,795,828 | 388,949 | 2,189,136 | 14,373,913 |
| 2019 | 30,405,000 | 2,156,319 | 6,788,121 | 39,349,440 |
| 2018 | 32,077,853 | 2,212,393 | 6,541,505 | 40,831,751 |
| 2017 | 37,273,916 | 2,275,650 | 6,443,667 | 45,993,233 |
| 2016 | 41,468,877 | 2,419,964 | 6,485,520 | 50,374,361 |

=== Intercity rail ===
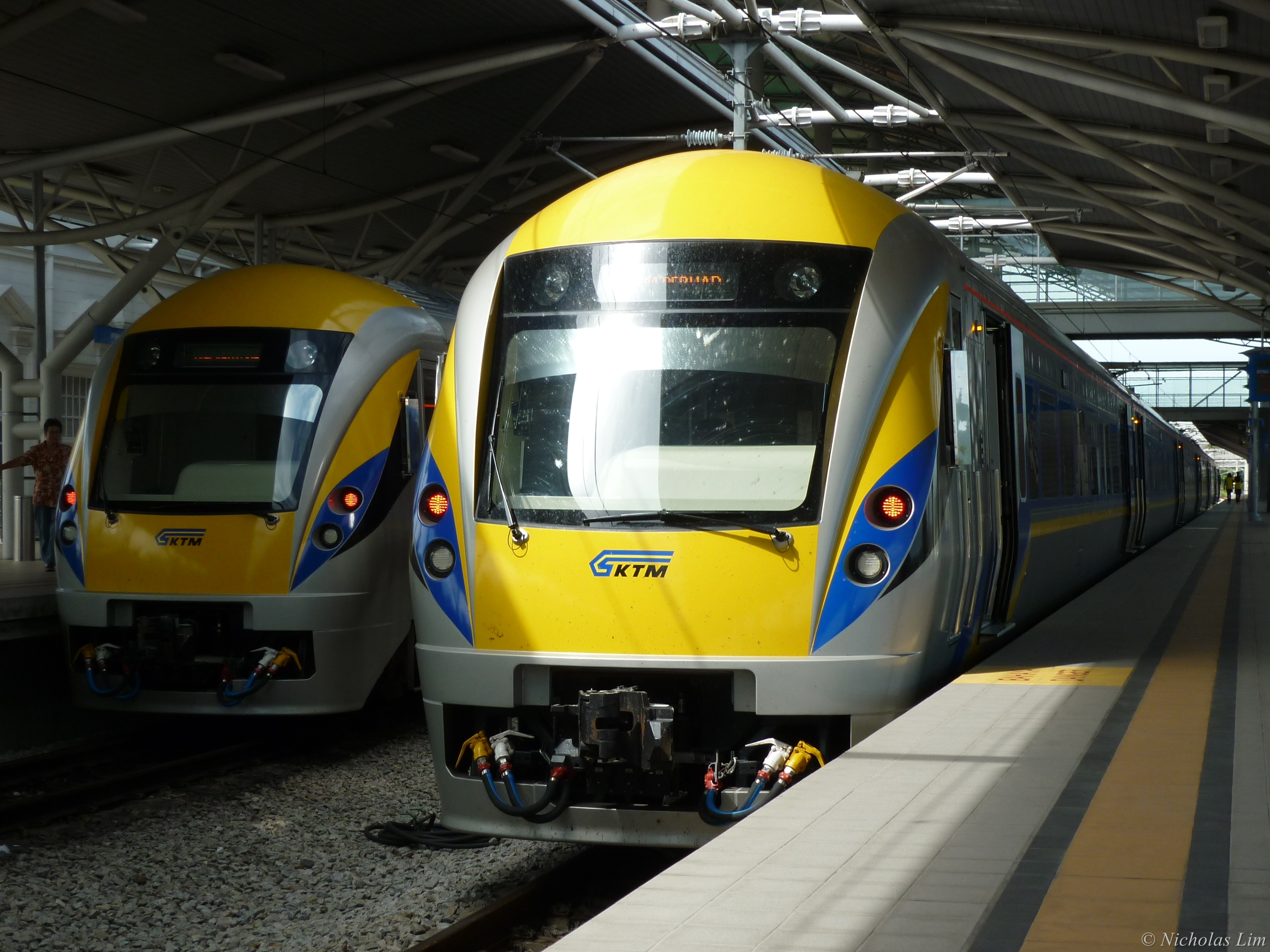
KTM Class 91 at Ipoh

Malaysia's inter-city rail network has been a cornerstone of the nation's transportation infrastructure, connecting major cities and towns across Peninsular Malaysia. The primary operator of intercity rail services in Malaysia is Keretapi Tanah Melayu (KTMB), which runs the service the KTM Intercity and KTM ETS services. These services provide an essential link for passengers, fostering economic growth and enhancing mobility across the country.

KTM Intercity (Malay: KTM Antarabandar) is the service brand name for long-haul passenger trains that connect cities and major towns served by the KTM rail network using conventional diesel locomotive-hauled coaches and diesel multiple units (DMUs). Services previously spun the entire length of the network, except branch-lines. Currently, the KTM Intercity serves the entirety of the KTM East Coast Line, and the portion of the KTM West Coast Line between Gemas and the Woodlands Train Checkpoint. The remainder of the West Coast Line is fully served by the KTM ETS service. KTM Intercity has also been involved in various types of collaborations, joint-promotions, and cross-promotions with all state-level tourism bodies, travel agencies and travel-related industry players in developing rail packages for group travellers.

KTM ETS, another service brand which stands for Electric Train Service, is a rapid intercity train service by KTM utilising electric train-sets. The service started in 2010 and had a recent expension in 2025. It currently operates on the entire main line West Coast Line between Padang Besar and JB Sentral, as well as the branch line to Butterworth. The trains travel up to 140 km/h (87 mph) on electrified lines. Each train set is capable of carrying up to 350 passengers.

==== Lines and systems ====
Defunct

| Sector | Line Code | Line Name | Length | Stations (Stop) | Opened | Operator |
|---|---|---|---|---|---|---|
| East Coast | Shuttle Timuran | Kuala Lipis-Gemas (2 return trips daily) | | 12 | | KTM |
| East Coast | Shuttle Timuran | Gua Musang-Kuala Lipis (1 return trip daily) | | 11 | | KTM |
| East Coast | Shuttle Timuran | Tumpat-Dabong (1 return trip daily) | | 17/21 | | KTM |
| East Coast | Shuttle Timuran | Tumpat-Gua Musang (2 return trips daily) | | 13/34 | | KTM |
| East Coast | Shuttle Timuran | Tumpat-Kuala Lipis (1 return trip daily) | | 33/40 | | KTM |
| West Coast and East Coast | Ekspres Rakyat Timuran | JB Sentral-Tumpat (1 overnight trip daily on each direction) | | 22 | | KTM |

==== Fleet ====
| Service Brand | Line Code/Name | Formation | In service | Rolling stock | Image | Speed in service | Manufacturers |
|---|---|---|---|---|---|---|---|
| | Business; Platinum; Gold; Silver | 6 cars EMU | 4 trainsets (24 cars); 19 trainsets (114 cars) | Hyundai Rotem "KTM Class 91"; CRRC Zhuzhou "KTM Class 93" | | 145 km (90 mi); 160 km (99 mi) | (South Korea) Hyundai Rotem; (China) CRRC Zhuzhou |
| | Shuttle Timuran | 4 cars DMU | 13 trainsets (52 cars) | CRRC Zhuzhou "KTM Class 61" | | 120 km (75 mi) | (China) CRRC Zhuzhou |
| | Ekspres Rakyat Timuran | | | | | | |

==== Ridership ====
Intercity Rail Ridership in Malaysia
| Year | KTM Intercity (1st class) | KTM Intercity (2nd class) | KTM Intercity (3rd class) | KTM ETS (Business) | KTM ETS (Platinum) | KTM ETS (Gold) | KTM ETS (Silver) | Total |
|---|---|---|---|---|---|---|---|---|
| 2025 | 40,000 | 3,788,000 | 662,000 | 238,000 | 2,483,000 | 1,499,000 | 182,000 | 8,892,000 |
| 2024 | 35,000 | 3,882,000 | 697,000 | 233,000 | 2,351,000 | 1,598,000 | 195,000 | 8,991,000 |
| 2023 | 32,000 | 3,947,000 | 723,000 | 225,000 | 2,250,000 | 1,672,000 | 193,000 | 9,042,000 |
| 2022 | 23,000 | 2,010,000 | 645,000 | 160,000 | 1,755,000 | 1,428,000 | 155,000 | 6,176,000 |

=== Rapid Transit ===
==== Light Rapid Transit (LRT) ====
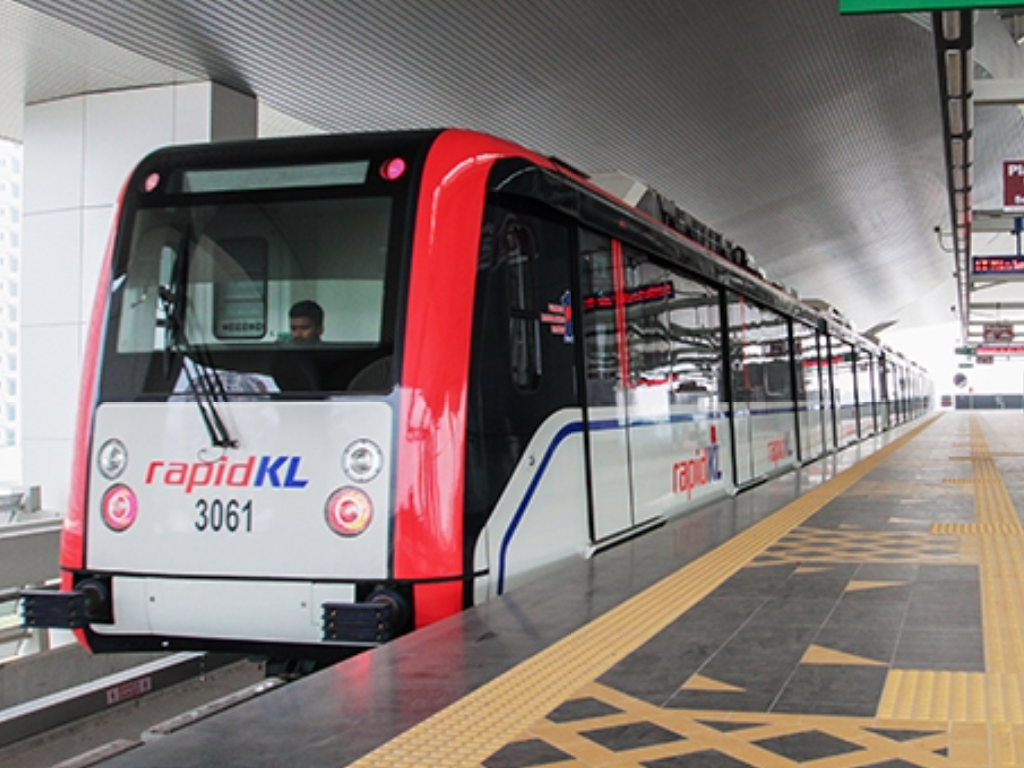
Rapid KL Sri Petaling Line

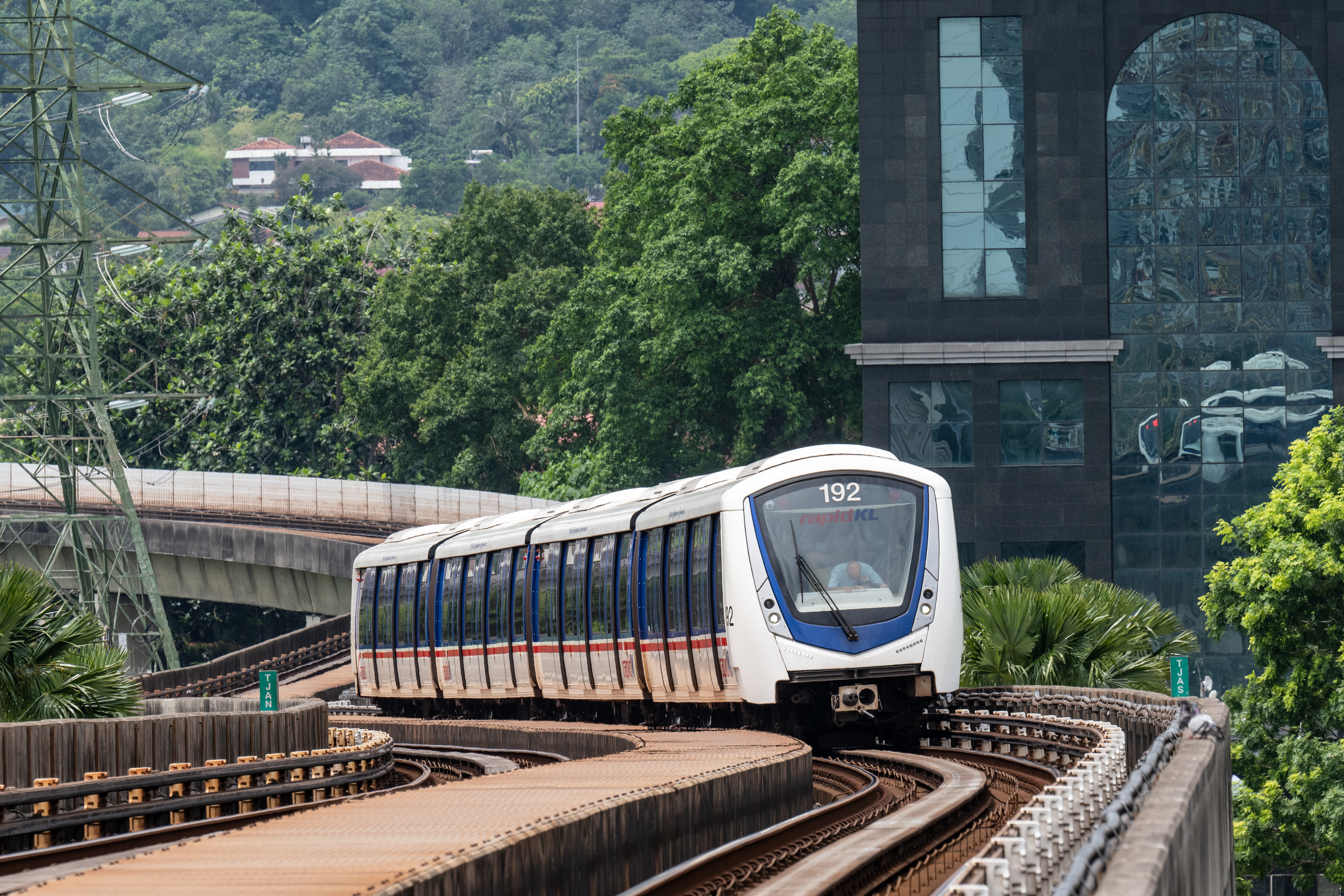
Rapid KL Kelana Jaya Line

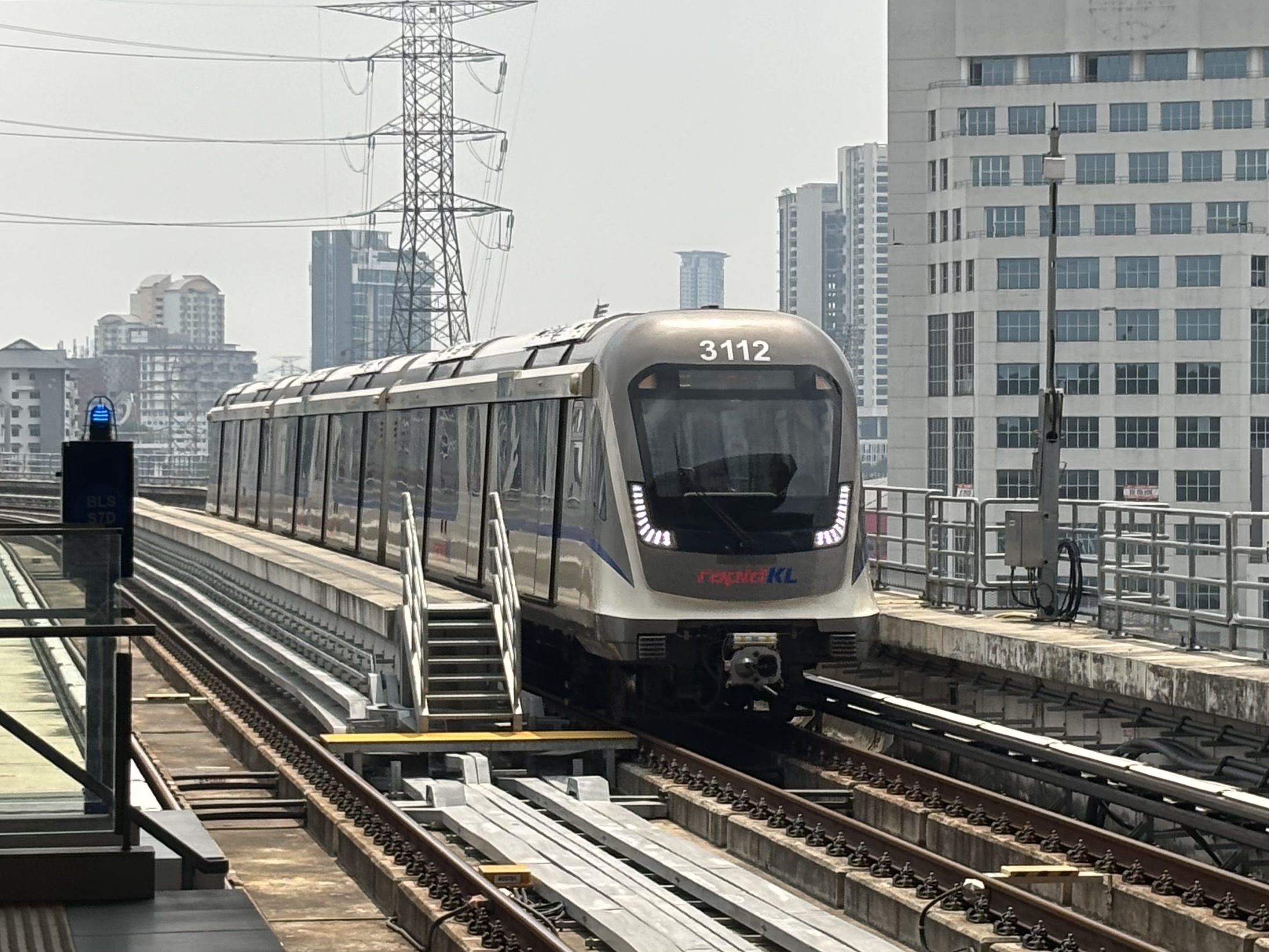
Rapid KL Shah Alam Line

The medium-capacity rail system, or officially named as Light Rapid Transit (LRT) by Prasarana Malaysia, is a rail system that consists of four lines: LRT Kelana Jaya Line, LRT Ampang Line, LRT Sri Petaling Line and LRT Shah Alam Line. The lines are operated by Rapid Rail and owned by Prasarana Malaysia. It is not to be confused with a light rail transit, which bears a similar acronym.

The Ampang and Sri Petaling Lines share a single rail line from Sentul Timur to Chan Sow Lin, before they branch off to Ampang and Putra Heights respectively. The combined 45.1 km (28.0 mi) line has 36 stations and uses semi-automated trains. The lines entered service with the first phase opening on 16 December 1996, second phase in July 1998 and a recent extension on 30 June 2016.

The Kelana Jaya Line is a 46.4 km (28.8 mi) LRT system which runs from Gombak to Putra Heights. It is the first fully automated and driverless rail system in Malaysia, and began operations on 1 September 1998. An extension project to connect the Kelana Jaya Line to the Sri Petaling Line via Putra Heights was completed on 1 July 2016.

The Shah Alam Line is a 37.8 km (23.5 mi) LRT system connecting from Bandar Utama to Johan Setia that began operations on 29 June 2026. It is the fourth fully automated and driverless rail system in Malaysia after the Kelana Jaya Line, Kajang Line and Putrajaya Line.

==== Mass Rapid Transit (MRT) ====
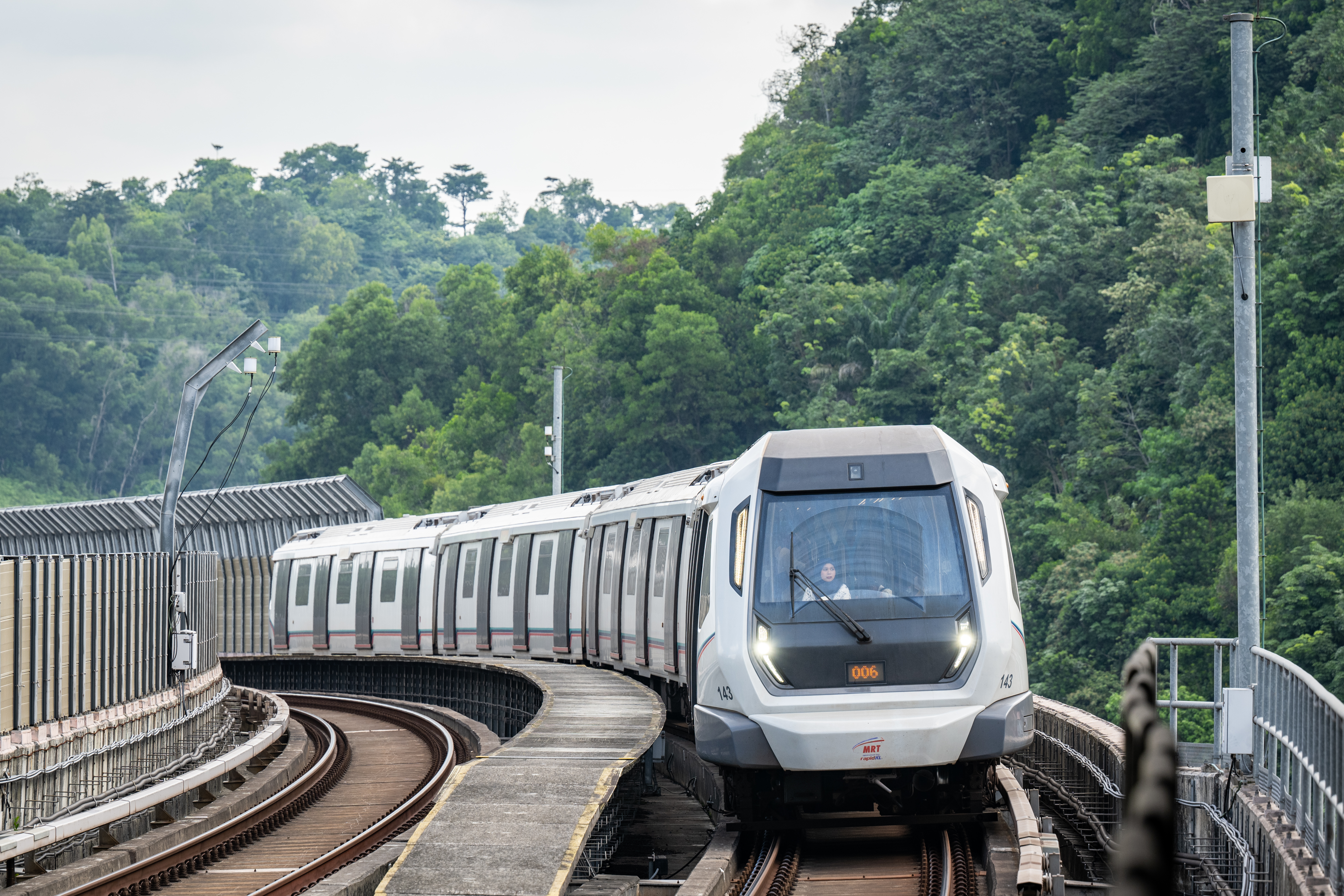
Rapid KL Kajang Line

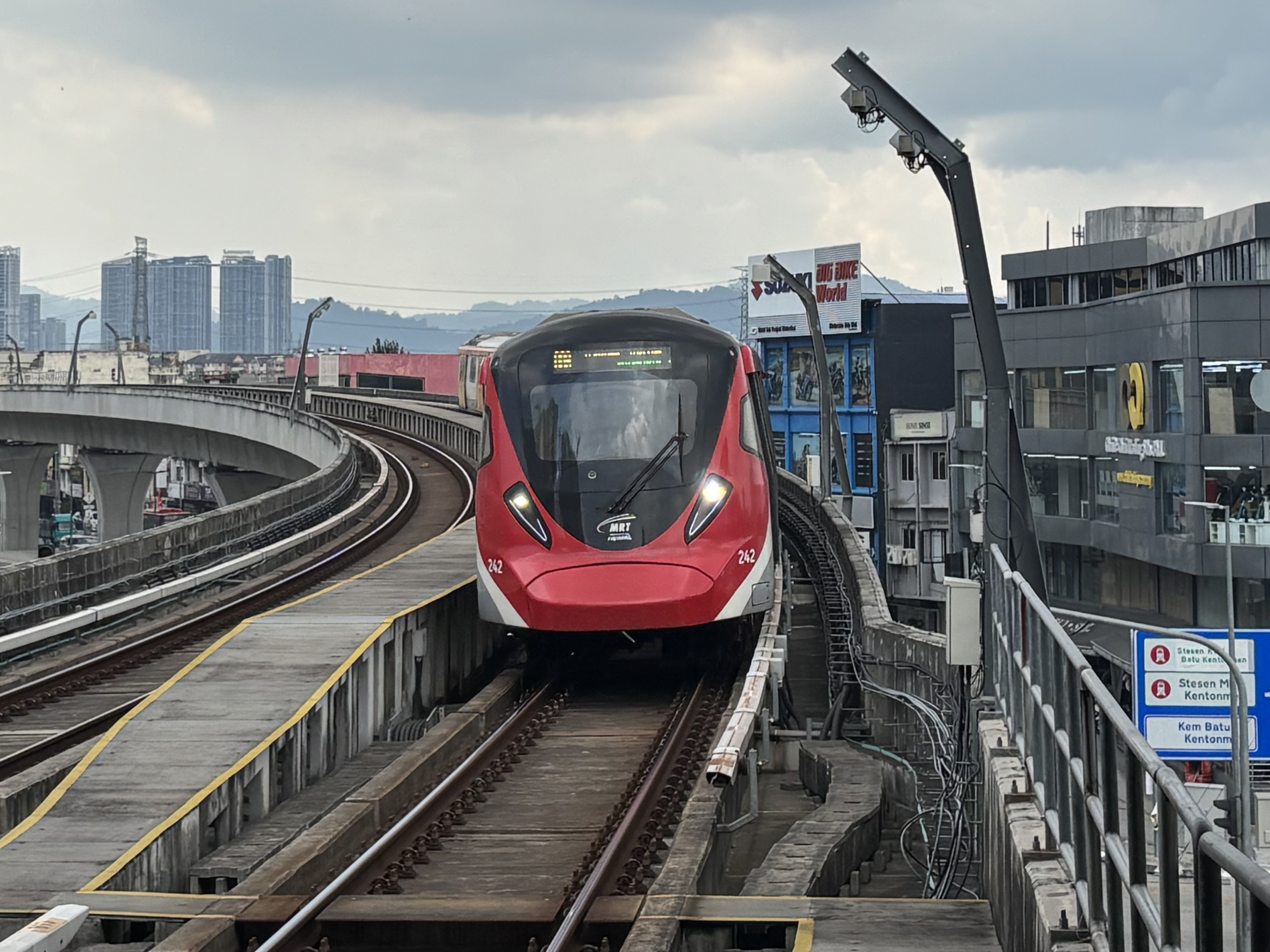
Rapid KL Putrajaya Line

As the population of the Klang Valley region grew higher and traffic congestion became much more problematic, the government had embarked on realising a public transport project to ease congestion. The new Klang Valley Mass Rapid Transit (KVMRT) project was drafted up on early 2010 with three lines to be built, which now include MRT Kajang Line, MRT Putrajaya Line and the upcoming MRT Circle Line. All three lines are operated by Rapid Rail and owned by MRT Corp. MRT stations are also supported with additional parking areas and feeder buses for last mile connectivity.

The MRT Kajang Line is the first mass rapid transit (MRT) line constructed in Malaysia. It is a fully automated and driverless rail system with 29 stations and stretches 46 km (29 mi) from Kwasa Damansara to Kajang. The MRT Kajang Line began construction on 8 July 2011, and its first phase finished on 16 December 2016. Since its full opening on 17 July 2017, the Kajang Line has been serving various densely populated suburban areas such as Bandar Utama, Kota Damansara and Balakong.

The second MRT line currently in operation is the Putrajaya Line. It also uses fully automated and driverless train-sets running from Kwasa Damansara to Putrajaya Sentral with a track length of 57.7 km (35.9 mi). Works on building the line began on 15 September 2016 and its first phase was opened on 16 June 2022. The second phase began operations on 16 March 2023. The Putrajaya Line provides an alternative travel route for the population of Putrajaya to travel to the heart of Kuala Lumpur without the need for a personal vehicle or using the KLIA Transit. The MRT Putrajaya Line also links several townships south of Kuala Lumpur, including Cyberjaya, Seri Kembangan and Sungai Besi as well as Universiti Putra Malaysia (UPM).

Cross border Rapid Transit System (RTS)

As the traffic flow on the borders of both countries gets more crowded, Malaysia had decided to construct a 4 kilometer Light Rail Project with only 2 stations known as the Rapid Transit System (RTS) Linking up Bukit Chagar Station (Johor) to Woodland North Station (Singapore). This project was constructed by Mass Rapid Transit Corporation Sdn. Bhd. (now known as Malaysia Rapid Transit Sdn. Bhd.) and operated by RTSO (RTS Operations Pte Ltd) a company by Prasarana Malaysia and SMRT Corporation Singapore. The project is planned to open in early 2027.

==== Monorail ====
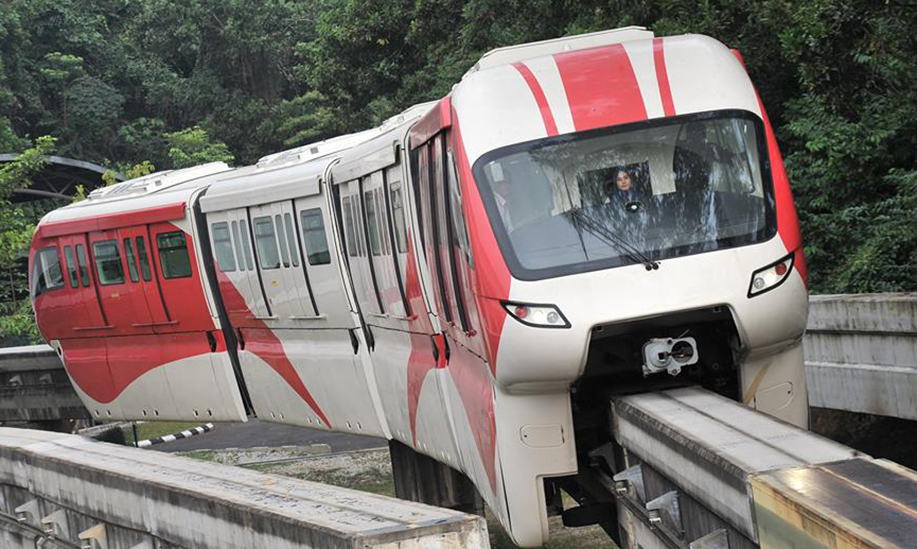
Rapid KL Monorail Line

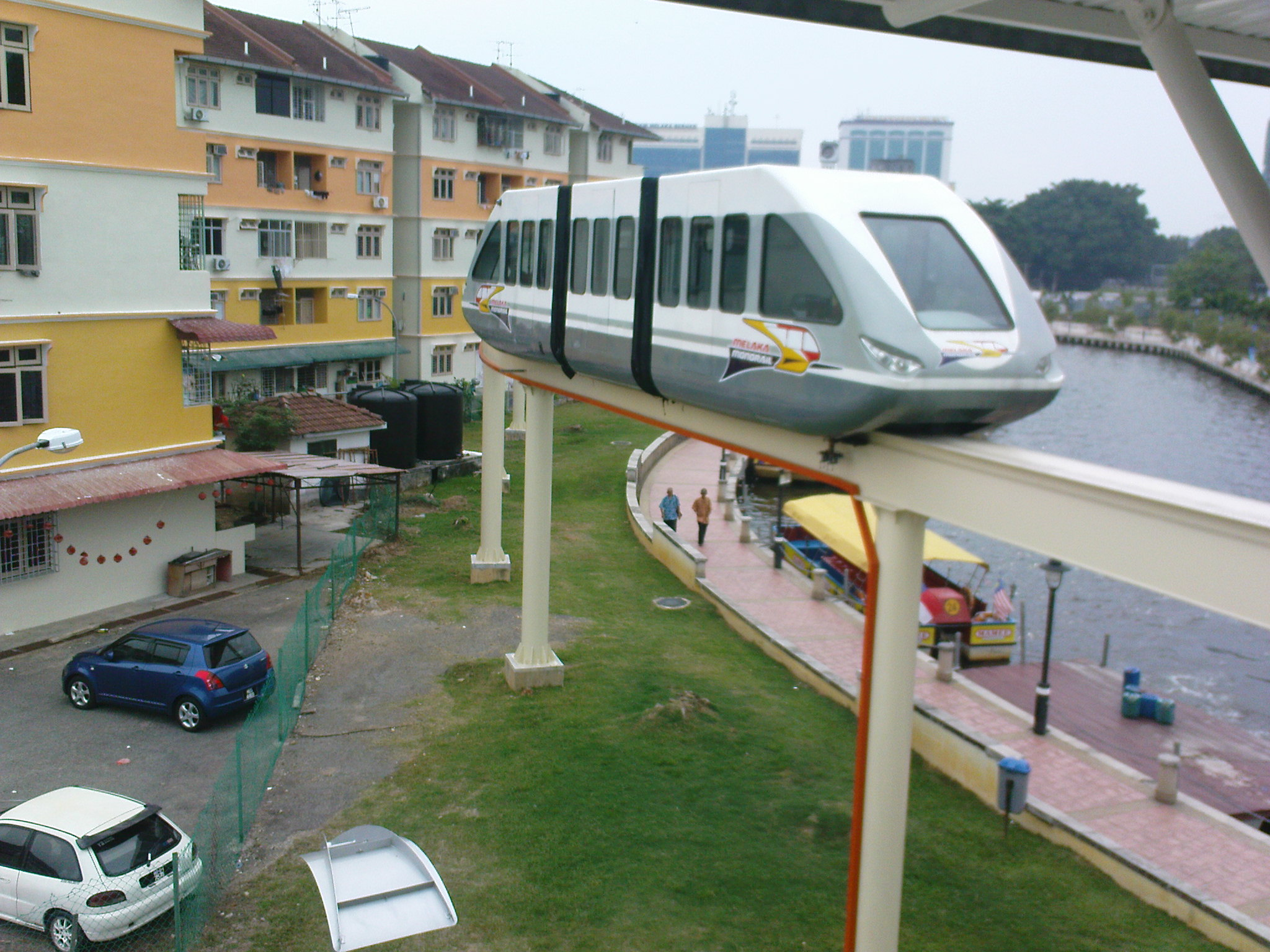
Malacca City's former monorail system

Malaysia has only one operational monorail system, the KL Monorail in Kuala Lumpur. Previously, another monorail line in Malacca City, the Melaka Monorail was also operational. Both monorail systems use elevated straddle-beams as rail tracks. The KL Monorail is mainly used for urban public transport, while the Melaka Monorail, now abandoned, was used as a displayed tourist attraction.

The KL Monorail is an 8.6 km (5.3 mi), 11-station monorail system operated by Rapid Rail and owned by Prasarana Malaysia. The monorail system uses 4-car train-sets built by Scomi Rail and serves areas from KL Sentral to Titiwangsa, as well as other areas such as Pudu, Bukit Bintang and Bukit Nanas. In 2021, the system served a total of 4.226 million passengers.

The Melaka Monorail is a 2.5 km (1.6 mi) uni-directional single track monorail system which formerly had three stations. Since its opening on 21 October 2010, the system suffered various incidents, including frequent breakdowns and lack of maintenance. The company, Monorail Theme Park & Studios, which operated the system, had its contract terminated in September 2021 and the system had stopped operating. There are currently no plans of reviving this system.

== Freight trains ==
KTM Kargo provides cargo conveyance services, with a network that spans almost the whole of the KTMB rail network. It is accessible from seaports and Inland Container Terminal (ICT) as well as industrial centres. Cargo services are a major contributor to KTM's overall revenue. Currently, there are 45 cargo train services daily with 23 routes daily, of which about 70% are concentrated in the Northern sector. KTMB runs 37 freight train services daily of which about 80% are concentrated in the Northern sector.

== Specialty trains ==
=== Funicular system ===
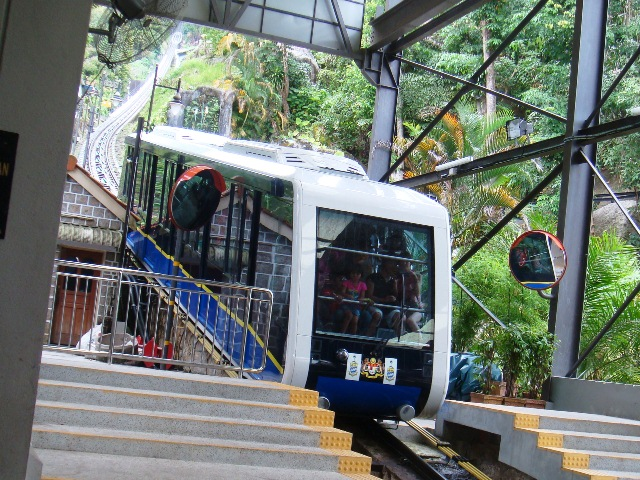
The Doppelmayr Garaventa 100-FUL Penang Hill coach at lower station

The Penang Hill Railway in Penang is the funicular system in Malaysia. The system uses a single metre-gauge railway track, with a total length of 2 km (1.2 mi) and a passing loop in the middle. The inclination is around 52.9% at maximum and 18.8% at minimum. The system was first opened as a two-section system in 1923 and managed by the former George Town Municipality (now Penang Island City Council). On 1 February 1977, the ownership was transferred to the Penang State Government and a complete overhaul was done in 2010 to convert the system into a one-section railway. The system travels through eight stations from the Lower Station at Air Itam to the Upper Station on top of the Penang Hill. Despite the upgrade done in 2010, the aging rail infrastructure had led to the system having several breakdowns as it could not support large number of passengers at certain times.

=== Cable transport ===
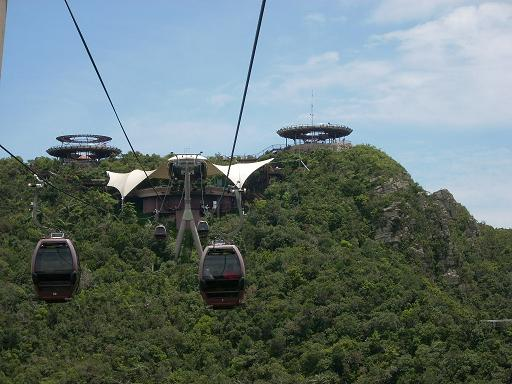
Langkawi Cable Car Top Station, the two circular viewing platforms are visible

Cable transport in Malaysia is typically used in the tourism industry to transport tourists to the peak of a hill or highland using gondola lifts. As of May 2023, there are three cable transport systems built: Langkawi Cable Car, Awana Skyway and Genting Skyway. The former is located in Langkawi Island, while the latter two are located in Genting Highlands.

The Langkawi Cable Car, or Langkawi SkyCab, is a 2.2 km (1.4 mi) cable transport system transporting tourists to the peak of Mount Machinchang. The journey time takes around 15 minutes, and upon arrival, tourists are able to go to the Langkawi Sky Bridge via an inclined elevator. The construction of the cable car was realised following a survey of the most feasible method of public transportation on Mount Machinchang. The cable car commenced operations in 2003, owned by the Langkawi Development Authority (LADA) and operated by Panorama Langkawi Sdn Bhd.

Another two cable car systems located in Genting Highlands are Awana Skyway and Genting Skyway. Awana Skyway is a three-station 2.4 km (1.5 mi) cable car system owned by Genting Malaysia Berhad. From 1977 to 2014, the system used an aerial tramway lift and had two stations. A newer mono cable gondola lift system was later constructed on the existing system and was subsequently opened in 2016. It uses 60mm diameter solid cable wire ropes with 22 pylons, making it safer compared to the previous system. The system now has three stations, taking passengers to either the Awana Station, Chin Swee Station or the SkyAvenue Station, with the whole trip taking around 10 minutes and with an operating speed of 6 m/s.

Besides the Awana Skyway, Genting Skyway is also a gondola lift cable car system in Genting Highlands. The system was opened on 21 February 1997, with two stations from Gohtong Jaya to Highlands Hotel. With a length of 3.38 km (2.10 mi), the system now serves as an alternative route whenever Awana Skyway is closed for maintenance. The trip duration for this system is 15 minutes, much longer compared to its twin system. This system is also owned by Genting Malaysia Berhad.

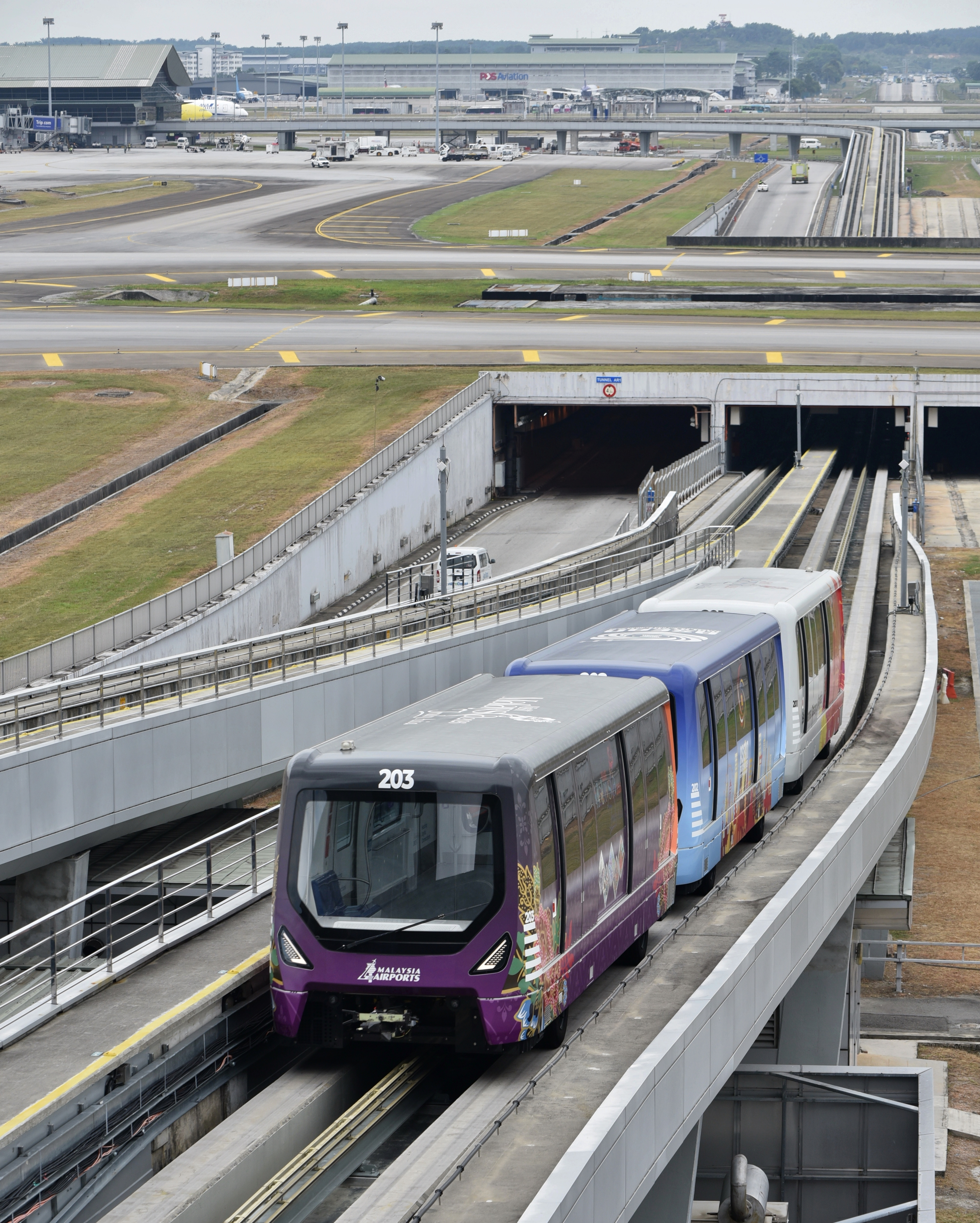
Innovia APM 300 at Kuala Lumpur International Airport

=== People mover ===
The only automated people mover system (APM) in Malaysia is the Aerotrain, which is located within Kuala Lumpur International Airport's (KLIA) Terminal 1. The 1.2 km (0.75 mi) APM first commenced operation in 1998 and is operated by the Engineering Transportation bureau of Malaysia Airport (Sepang) Sdn Bhd. The system serves from Terminal A of KLIA to Satellite Terminal A and takes around 2.5 minutes of travel time. The system ceased operations on 2 March 2023 due to technical problems on the aging system, and was initially planned to gradually reopen starting June 2024. The system resumed service starting 1 July 2025.

== Railway operators ==
=== Keretapi Tanah Melayu Berhad ===
The main intercity passenger train operator is Keretapi Tanah Melayu (KTM), a corporation owned by the Malaysian government. It operates the diesel-hauled KTM Intercity passenger trains on the entire East Coast Line and the southern portion of the West Coast Line, and the electrified KTM ETS passenger trains along the remaining portion of the West Coast Line, between Padang Besar and Gemas and the Butterworth branch line. KTM also operates freight trains along both railway lines. Under KTM Komuter, KTM operates commuter rail services along double-track and electrified portions of the West Coast Line between Tanjung Malim in Perak and Pulau Sebang in Negeri Sembilan, and between Padang Besar in Perlis and Ipoh in Perak, as well as the Butterworth, Port Klang and Batu Caves branch lines. Besides its own network, KTM also operates trains on the Kerteh-Kuantan railway under contract with Petronas, the owner of the line.

=== Sabah State Railway ===
The Sabah State Railway, previously the North Borneo Railway, is the only state department in Malaysia to operate a railway service. It operates passenger and freight services along the 134 km railway line between Tanjung Aru and Tenom in East Malaysia.

=== Express Rail Link Sdn Bhd ===
The Express Rail Link (ERL) is a private company that was set up to develop and operate the high-speed railway between Kuala Lumpur's KL Sentral station and the Kuala Lumpur International Airport. It operates two services along the 59.1 km standard gauge line, the non-stop KLIA Ekspres and the commuter-like KLIA Transit. Trains on the two services can reach a maximum speed of 160 km/h and are the fastest in Malaysia. Besides trains, the company also provides check-in facilities at its Kuala Lumpur City Airport Terminal at KL Sentral. Except for check-in baggage of passengers, Express Rail Link does not handle any cargo.

=== Rapid Rail Sdn Bhd ===
Rapid Rail was set up by Prasarana Malaysia to operate the rapid transit public transport service in the Klang Valley. Prasarana Malaysia is fully owned by Ministry of Finance Incorporated, the corporate arm of the Malaysian Ministry of Finance. The company currently operates two MRT lines, three LRT lines and one monorail line in Kuala Lumpur under the Rapid KL brand, namely the Kajang Line, Putrajaya Line, Ampang Line, Sri Petaling Line, Kelana Jaya Line and KL Monorail.

=== RTS Operations Pte Ltd ===
RTS Operations (RTSO) is a collabaration between Prasarana Malaysia and SMRT Corporation Singapore to operate the Rapid Transit System Link (RTS Link) service in between Bukit Chagar (Johor) and Woodlands North (Singapore).

=== Other operators ===
- Malaysia Airports (Sepang) Berhad: The main operator of airports in Malaysia is also the operator of the Aerotrain at Kuala Lumpur International Airport.
- Penang Hill Corporation: The Penang Hill Railway is managed by the Penang Hill Corporation, a statutory body of the Penang state government.

== See also ==
- Rail transport by country
- Transport in Malaysia
- Klang Valley Integrated Transit System
- Kuala Lumpur–Singapore high-speed rail
- Keretapi Tanah Melayu
  - KTM Intercity and KTM ETS
    - KTM West Coast railway line
    - KTM East Coast railway line
  - KTM Komuter
    - Seremban Line
    - Port Klang Line
    - Skypark Link
    - Northern Sector
- Railway electrification in Malaysia
- Public transport in Kuala Lumpur
