= KotaSAS =

Township located about 10 km from Kuantan

Kota Sultan Ahmad Shah KotaSAS
- Future administrative capital of Pahang
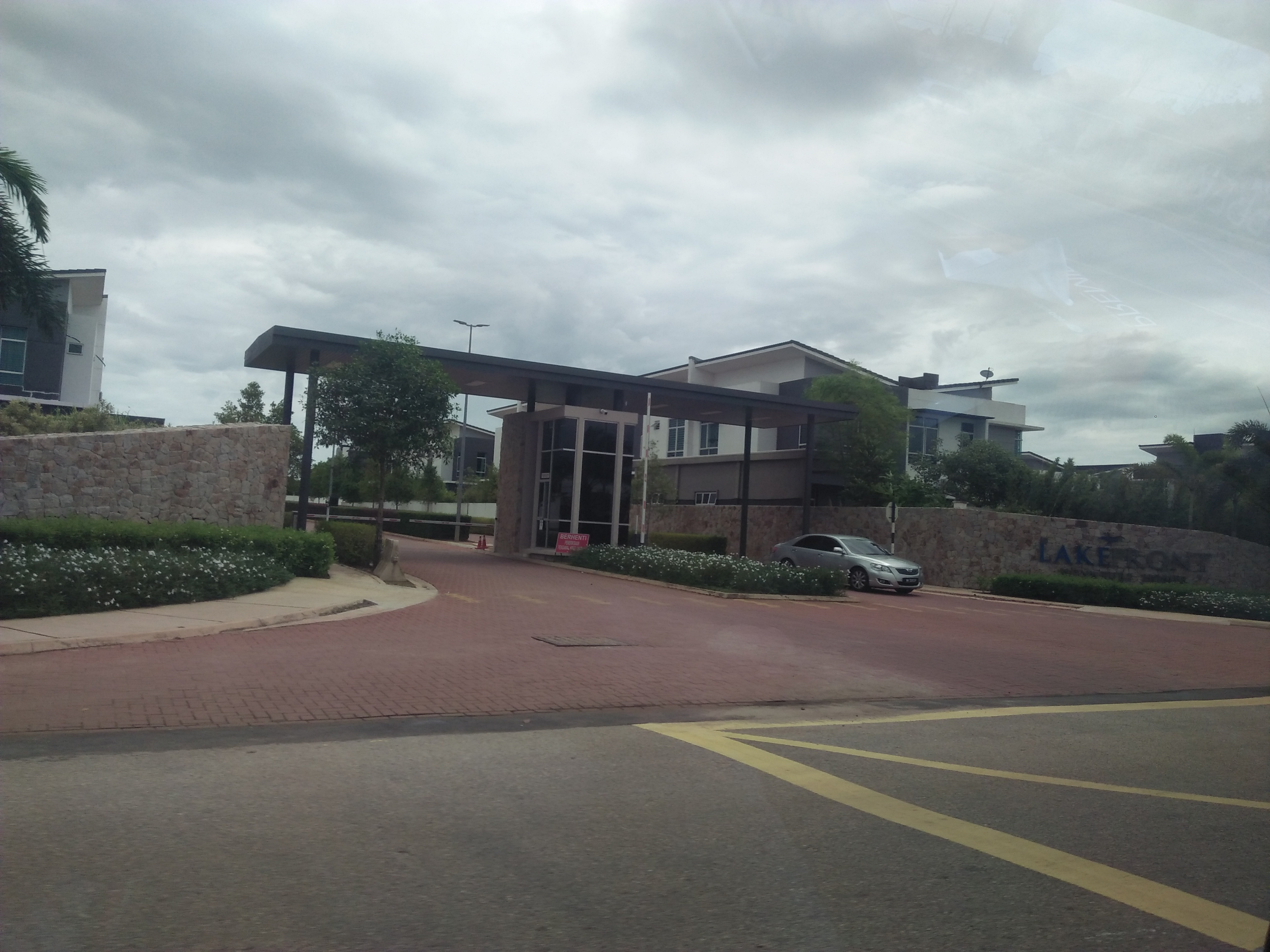
- Gated residences in KotaSAS
- Etymology: Sultan Ahmad Shah
- Interactive map of Kota Sultan Ahmad Shah
- Country: Malaysia
- State: Pahang
- District: Kuantan

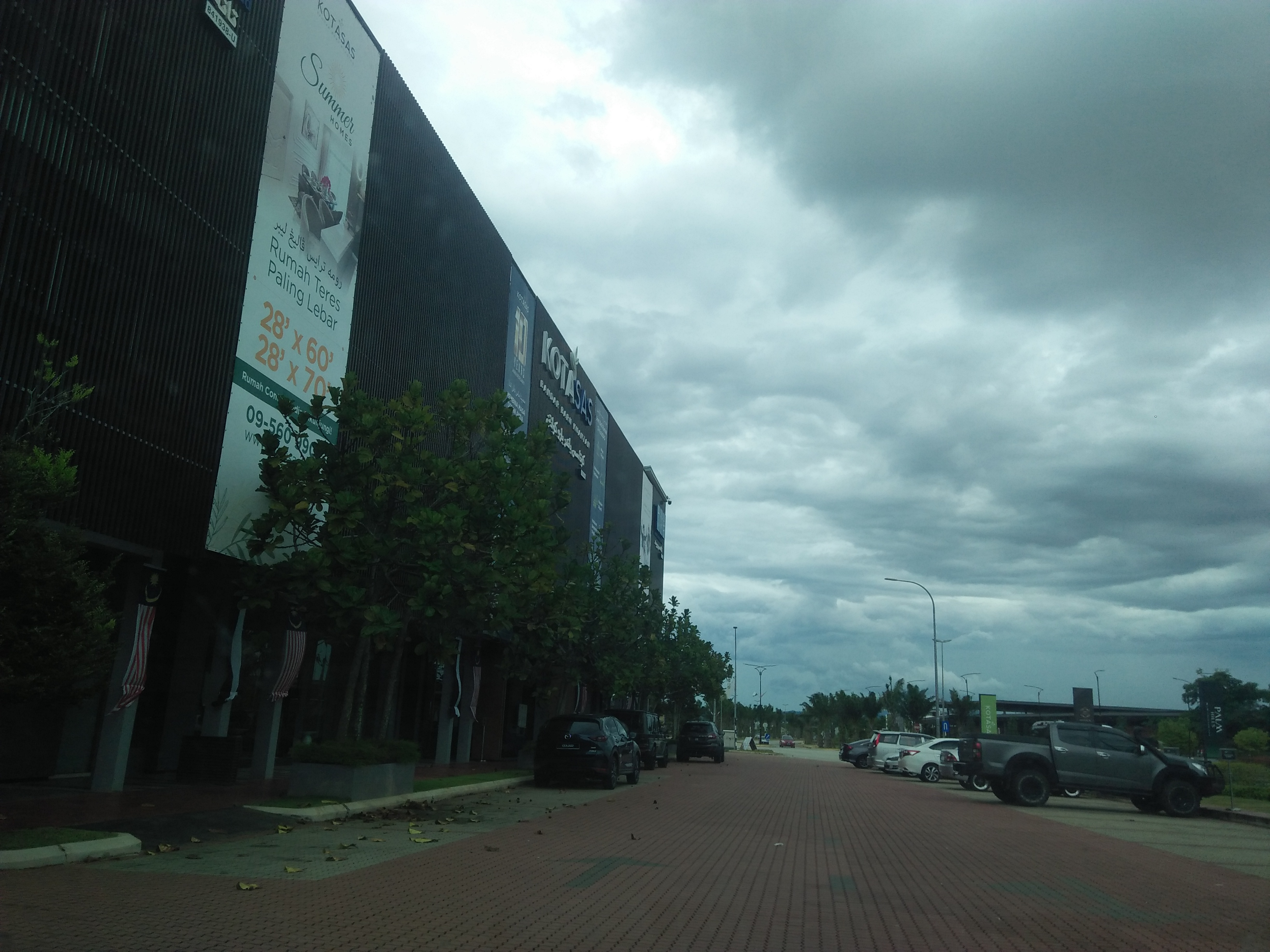
Modern shophouses in KotaSAS

Kota Sultan Ahmad Shah (Jawi: كوتا سلطان احمد شاه), known as KotaSAS, is a planned township located about 10 kilometers northwest of Kuantan, Pahang, Malaysia. It will serve as the new administrative centre for the state once fully completed.

The development of KotaSAS as a new township started in 2006, with Tanah Makmur Berhad commissioned as the main developer. The currently under-construction ECRL project has included a station to serve this township that bears its name, situated roughly a kilometer away, making this township accessible to the rest of the Malaysian rail network.
