= Kerteh–Kuantan Port railway line =

Railway line in Peninsular Malaysia

The Kerteh–Kuantan Port railway line is a defunct railway line in the East Coast of Peninsular Malaysia. This 77 km long 1,000 mm (3 ft 3 3/8 in) gauge railway line connected the Petronas oil refinery in Kerteh, Terengganu, to Kuantan Port in Kuantan, Pahang. This railway line crossed the five towns in Kemaman (Kerteh, Kemasik, Ulu Chukai, Binjai and Banggul) in Terengganu and Cherating in Kuantan, Pahang. It was managed by Petronas. The rail operation was terminated in November 2010.

As of 2023, the East Coast Railway Line has partially reused most portions of the alignment and is expected to be operational by 2027.

== Operational issues ==
Upon completion of the railway line, it faced issues such as slope stability, erosion, and settlement which significantly reduced its ability to operate. There was also a lack of utilization and slow speed. Poor maintenance and poor construction ultimately lead to the railway line being inoperable.

== Features ==
The line features:

- Single railway track linking the Petronas refinery complex and the nearby town Kerteh, Terengganu and Gebeng petrochemical complex in Kuantan Port in Kuantan, Pahang
- Three depots in Kerteh, Gebeng and Kuantan
- Two locomotives
- 50 wagons with a capacity of 60 metric tons each
- Two units of the BGVs

== Stations ==
Name	Type	Notes
Kerteh railway station	Cargo terminal	
Kuantan Port railway station	Cargo terminal	
