= Sarawak Railway Line =

Proposed railway in Malaysia

The Sarawak Railway Line is a proposed project by the Malaysian government to establishing a railway network in the state of Sarawak. In 2008, it was reported the project will be ready in 2015 but still no signs of development by the government until present.

== History ==
Together with its neighbour of Sabah, Sarawak once had a small railway line, about 10 miles (16 km) long serving the region of Kuching, providing cargo and passenger services. It was opened in August 1915 and was ordered closed in 1931 due to financial losses, amidst the Great Depression. In the following years it was used occasionally to haul stone from the quarry at the 10th mile of the line, and during World War II it was taken over by the Japanese.

The line was finally closed in 1947; the tracks were sold for scrap in Singapore in 1959. During operation, the passenger coaches were acquired from Burma while the goods wagons were bought second-hand from FMSR. To date, Sarawak, as Malaysia's largest state by area, has no rail transport. In the modern days, the Malaysian government is planning to revive the Sarawak railway system back beside upgrading the rail network in Sabah.

== Expansion proposal and connection of Borneo railway systems ==
Once if the project is complete, there is also a proposal to connecting the rail networks of Sabah and Sarawak in Malaysia with the provinces of Kalimantan in Indonesia that will be called as Trans-Borneo Railway, as Indonesia were currently developing the railway network on their side.

== See also ==
- Trans-Borneo Railway
- Kuching Urban Transportation System
- Rail transport in Malaysia
