= Trans-Borneo Railway =

International railway network

Overview
- Native name: Kereta Api Trans-Borneo
- Status: Proposed
- Locale: Sarawak; Sabah; Brunei; Kalimantan
- Stations: TBD

Service
- Type: Commuter rail Inter-city rail Rail freight transport

Technical
- Line length: TBD
- Track gauge: TBD
- Operating speed: TBD

The Trans-Borneo Railway (Malay: Kereta Api Trans-Borneo) is a proposed international railway network that will connect the territories of Malaysia, Brunei and Indonesia on the island of Borneo. The proposed network will link major urban, logistics and industrial centres in Sabah, Sarawak, Brunei and Kalimantan.

Currently, there is only one operational rail network on the island of Borneo which is the Sabah State Railway; a 134-kilometre single track line that connects Tanjung Aru, Kota Kinabalu to Tenom.

== Background ==
The island of Borneo which is among the world's largest islands and home to over 20 million inhabitants does not possess an extensive rail network. Rail transport currently only exists in Sabah linking the West Coast and Interior of Sabah, the metre gauge single track Western Sabah Railway Line. Recent developments such as Indonesia's planned move of its capital to Kalimantan as well as increased focus on development in East Malaysia has increased the push for a comprehensive rail network for Borneo. Brunei-based Brunergy Utama Sdn Bhd proposed and outlined plans for a US$70 billion project. The proposal entailed two routes covering 1620 km with high-speed trains reaching 300–350 km/h. In March 2026. the Malaysian Transport Minister Anthony Loke mentioned that a feasibility study for the rail network is underway and expected to be completed by mid 2026. He estimated that the rail network would take decades to be fully constructed. The study looks into the proposed rail alignments and possible integration with the under construction Kuching Urban Transportation System. In October 2026, the study was announced to have been completed on 7 August 2026.

== Alignment ==
On the Malaysian side, the Sarawak Deputy Transport Minister Datuk Dr Jerip Susil mentioned that the proposed alignment in Sarawak will traverse Kuching, Samarahan, Sri Aman, Sarikei, Sibu, Bintulu and Miri divisions continuing into Brunei and re-entering Sarawak through Limbang. The proposed alignment will connect major population centers, industrial areas, ports, airports and other logistics nodes. Among ports that were identified for rail connection are Kuching, Tanjung Manis, Bintulu, Samalaju and Miri. In Sabah, the Ministry of Transport confirmed that the Kota Kinabalu-Kudat corridor is among the key routes assessed by the feasibility study. The study also explores potential rail connection to major portsin Sabah such as Sepanggar, Lahad Datu, and Tawau.

== See also ==
- Sabah State Railway
- Sarawak Railway Line
- Rail transport in Malaysia
- Rail transport in Brunei
- Rail transport in Indonesia
