= Melaka Monorail =

Defunct monorail in Malacca City, Malaysia

Coordinates: 2.2037°N 102.2516°E

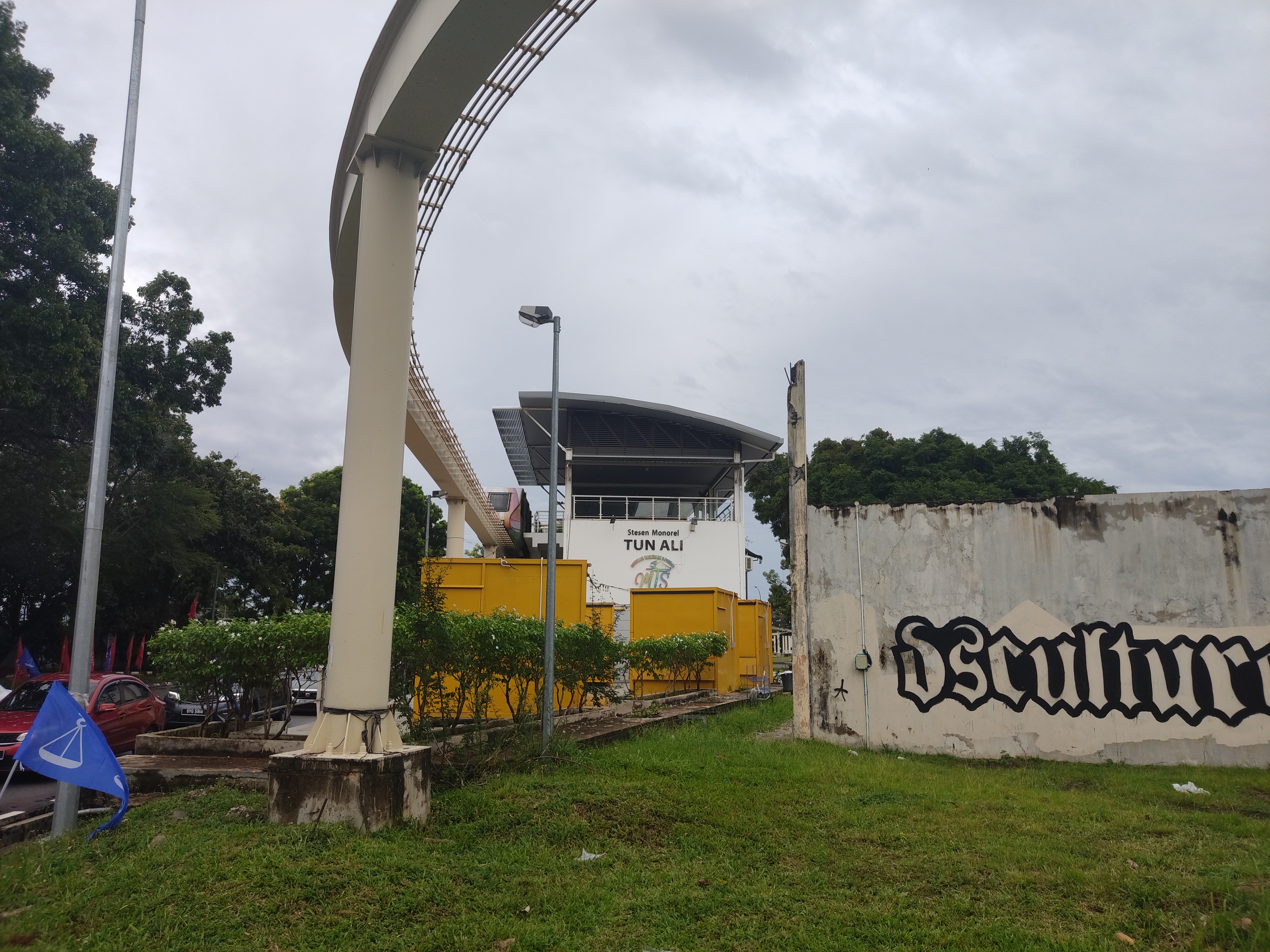
- The abandoned Tun Ali Monorail Station

Overview
- Native name: Monorail Theme Park & Studios
- Status: Suspended
- Locale: Malacca City
- Termini: Tun Ali
- Stations: 3 (All currently closed)

Service
- Type: Straddle-beam Monorail
- Services: Tun Ali
- Operator(s): Monorail Theme Park & Studios Sdn Bhd
- Rolling stock: Three-car trains

History
- Opened: 21 October 2010; 16 years ago

Technical
- Line length: 2.5 km (1.6 mi)
- Character: Elevated

The Melaka Monorail (Note: This monorail project uses the Malay language spelling of the state's name, as opposed to the more traditional English language spelling of its name, "Malacca") was a monorail system in Malacca City, Malacca, Malaysia with 3 stations – Tun Ali, Hang Tuah and Hang Jebat. Troubled since its inception in 2010, with services suspended between 2013 and 2017, the monorail has not been operational since the COVID-19 Malaysian movement control order in 2020.

== History ==
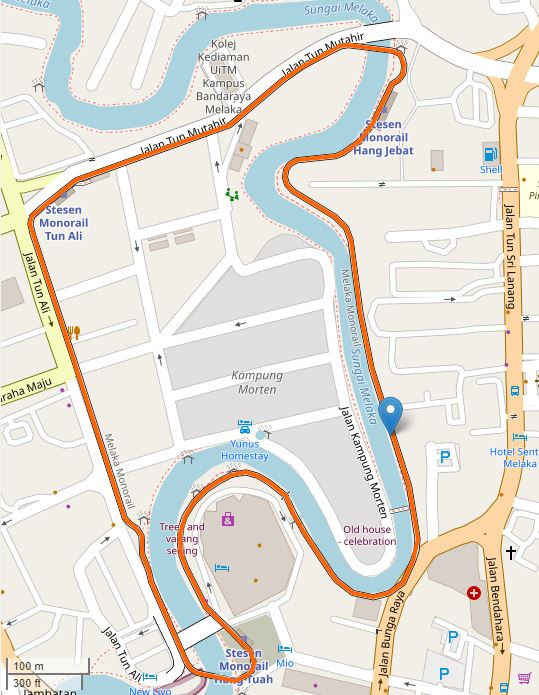
Melaka Monorail route map

The first phase of the system, built at a cost of RM15.9 million and covering 1.6 km from Taman Rempah in Pengkalan Rama to Hang Tuah Station at Kampung Bunga Raya Pantai, was opened to the public on 21 October 2010. However, hours after opening, the monorail ground to a halt, stranding 20 passengers inside. As of December 2010, after a series of similar problems it was no longer operational; the monorail was however spotted at nights doing test runs in 2011.

After 4 years being suspended since 2013 due to technical problems, the Melaka Monorail service began operating again on 4 December 2017. The service operated from 10am to 10pm on weekdays, with extended service till midnight on weekends, using one coach that accommodate up to 15 people. Each round trip took 30 minutes, with tickets priced at RM10 each.

The monorail suspended operations in March 2020 due to the COVID-19 Malaysian movement control order, and the operator's contract was terminated in 2021.

== Route ==
The Melaka Monorail is a uni-directional clockwise loop covering 2.5 km starting from Tun Ali Station, crossing the Malacca River plying parallel to Jalan Tun Mutahir, bypassing Hang Jebat Station, running parallel south on the east side of the Malacca River, bypassing Hang Tuah Station, crossing the Malacca River again, running parallel to Jalan Tun Ali, and returning to Tun Ali Station.

== See also ==
- List of monorail systems
- KL Monorail
