= MRL East Coast Rail Link =

Infrastructure project in Malaysia

East Coast Rail Link Kota Bharu–Port Klang

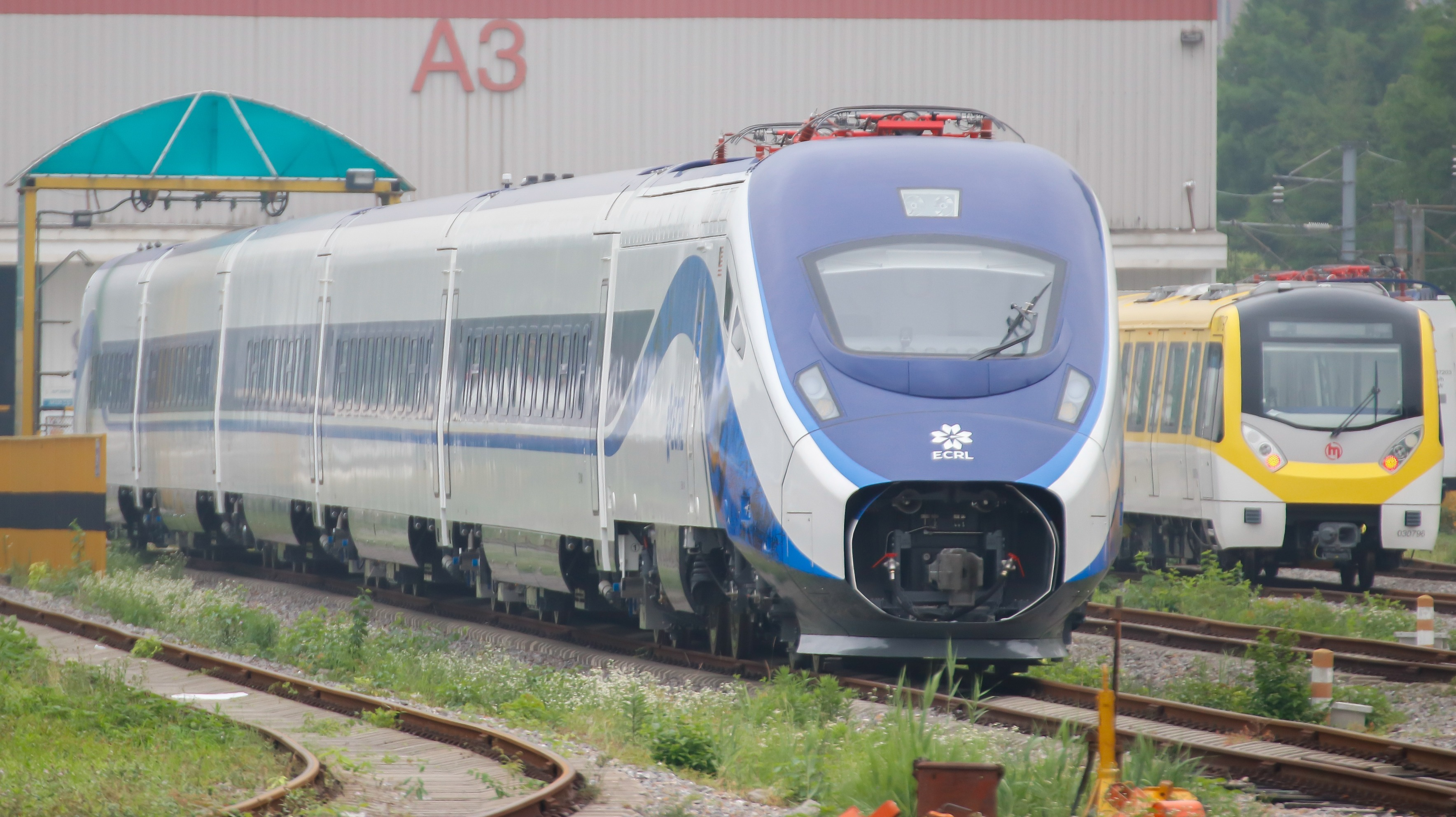
- A CR200J series train that will be used for the East Coast Rail Link

Overview
- Native name: Laluan Rel Pantai Timur
- Status: Under construction (98.16% as of October 2026)
- Owner: Malaysia Rail Link Sdn Bhd
- Locale: Section A : Kota Bharu – Pasir Puteh – Jerteh - Bandar Permaisuri – Kuala Terengganu; Section B : Dungun – Kemasik – Chukai – Cherating – Kuantan Port City – KotaSAS – Gambang – Maran; Section C : Temerloh – Bentong – Gombak – Serendah – Puncak Alam – Kapar – Northport/Westport
- Stations: 20
- Website: mrl.com.my (owner's website) ecrl.com.my (official website)

Service
- Type: Inter-city rail, rail freight transport
- Operator(s): Malaysia Rail Link Sdn Bhd & CCCC Joint Venture
- Depot: Kuantan Port City
- Rolling stock: ECRL CR200J EMU - 6-car set Power Concentrated EMU (Push–pull train); Formation: Mc+4T+Tc
- Ridership: 5.40 million by 2030 (estimated)

History
- Planned opening: Phase 1: ITT Gombak - Kota Bharu; 12 December 2026; 22 days' time Phase 2: ITT Gombak - Jalan Kastam; January 2028; 13 months' time

Technical
- Line length: 665 km (413 mi) mixed single and double track with the entire provisional double track
- Track gauge: 1,435 mm (4 ft 8 1/2 in) standard gauge
- Electrification: 25 kV 50 Hz AC overhead line
- Conduction system: With driver
- Operating speed: Maximum: 200—210 km/h Trial run: 175—180 km/h Service: 160 km/h (passenger train); 80 km/h (freight train)
Route map

The East Coast Rail Link (ECRL, Malay: Laluan Rel Pantai Timur) is an under-construction higher-speed double-track railway project connecting Port Klang on the Straits of Malacca to Kota Bharu in northeast Peninsular Malaysia, linking the East Coast Economic Region states of Pahang, Terengganu, and Kelantan to one another and to the central region of the peninsula's west coast.

The project is set to carry both passengers and freight from the west coast of Malaysia to the east, and vice versa. Construction began in August 2017.

On 3 July 2018, Malaysia Rail Link Sdn Bhd (MRL) instructed China Communications Construction Company (CCCC) to suspend all work under the engineering, procurement, construction, and commissioning contract of ECRL. The suspension was lifted a few months later after the signing of a supplementary agreement between MRL and CCCC in April 2019 on a revised construction cost and realignment of the southern route of the rail link.

ECRL is realized by a semi-automatic Chinese technology that lays 1.5 km of tracks a day with an accuracy of 10 millimeters using GPS satellites.

== Project proposal ==
=== Infrastructure ===
The project provides for the double tracking and standard gauge railway line. The infrastructure includes spur lines, tunnels, bridges, viaducts, depots, stations and a signalling system.

=== Board of directors ===
- Chairman: Mohammad Zuki Ali
- Director: Fauzi Abdul Rahman

=== Services ===
According to the first realignment, the inter-city passenger trains will use 6 car-train sets for EMUs travelling at 160 km per hour, cutting travel time from Kota Bharu to Gombak and Port Klang to around four and six hours respectively. The freight (cargo) trains use electric locomotives running at 80 km per hour.

Meanwhile, for international freight service from China to Europe via Malaysia, the original alignment of ECRL is expected to help reduce the shipping time by as much as 30 hours.

== Route and stations ==
Route of MRL East Coast Rail Link

=== Original alignment ===
==== Phase 1 ====
The proposed alignment for Phase 1 of the railway features 22 stations running along a 600.3 km route. The new rail link is projected to connect passengers from Kota Bharu in Kelantan to ITT Gombak in Selangor in less than four hours.

It will start north of Kuala Lumpur at the Integrated Transport Terminal Gombak (ITT Gombak), the future interchange with the Kelana Jaya Line and main long-distance bus terminal. From the Klang Valley the line will run east through the state of Pahang, serving the towns of Bentong, Mentakab, Maran and Gambang, KotaSAS before reaching the state capital, Kuantan where there will be two stations namely Kuantan Port City 2 (freight) and Kuantan Port City 1 (passenger).

From Kuantan, the line will turn north to Cherating before entering the state of Terengganu, where it will serve the towns of Chukai, Kemasik, Kerteh (Provisional), Dungun, Pengkalan Berangan, state capital Kuala Terengganu as well as via Telaga Papan and Kampung Raja area.

The ECRL will continue north into Kelantan, serving stations at Tok Bali and Jelawat, before ending at Kota Bharu.

The rail link includes a total of 50 km of tunnelling and underground alignment. The tunnelling works will be carried out along the Gombak-Bentong area where the single-longest twin hill-tunnel spanning 18 km will be built under the Titiwangsa Mountains. There will also be several underground lines, including in the heavily populated Gombak area near the Kuala Lumpur city centre.

==== Phase 2 ====
Phase 2 of ECRL will have an estimated length of 88 km. This phase will cover the stretch from Gombak North to Port Klang (Jalan Kastam) through Serendah and two more future stations located at Puncak Alam and Kapar. As well, a further extension between Kota Bharu and Pengkalan Kubor will also be built. The cost of construction for this section of the ECRL is RM9 billion. With Phase 1 and Phase 2 combined, the total length of the entire line is about 688 km and the construction cost amounting to RM55 billion.

=== First realignment ===
Due to the change of government in 2018, the new Pakatan Harapan government initially planned to cancel the project but instead decided to realign the route especially on the Section C between Port Klang and Mentakab, Pahang. This realignment would add extra two hours of travelling time between Kota Bharu to Port Klang from the original four hours to six hours.

Below are the new changes made due to the realignment.

- Double tracking from Port Klang to Kota Bharu bypass Gombak and Bentong.
- Standard gauges were used and the maximum speed for passenger is 160 km/h and for freight is 80 km/h.
- The number of stations reduced to 20 and these stations had been removed from list:
  - Pengkalan Kubor, Tumpat
  - Wakaf Bharu, Tumpat
  - Jelawat, Bachok
  - Telaga Papan, Setiu
  - Kerteh, Kemaman
  - Kuantan Sentral, Paya Besar
  - Bentong
  - Gombak North, Gombak
  - ITT Gombak, Kuala Lumpur
  - Serendah, Hulu Selangor
  - Puncak Alam, Kuala Selangor
  - Kapar, Klang
  - Northport, Klang

and the following stations were shifted to another place or new stations:

- Kota Bharu station will be located near Kampung Tunjong, passed through Melor town and portion of Bachok District land, and then will reached Pasir Puteh station and go ahead to Jerteh station via tunnel.
- Kuala Terengganu station, formerly situated at Kuala Nerus, was shifted to Marang District near Wakaf Tapai.
- Pengkalan Berangan station which formerly situated at Marang south was shifted to Marang west, making it nearer Marang town, and become a proposed station.
- Temerloh station will be integrated with current KTMB Mentakab via spur line.
- Klawang station will be located at Kampung Seperi, Kuala Klawang, Negeri Sembilan
- Nilai Sentral station will be integrated with new KTMB komuter station.
- Putrajaya Sentral station will be integrated with the current station via spur line, the section at Putrajaya will be elevated and pass Presint 14, 1 and 9.
- Jenjarom station which is located at oil palm area.
- Westport station, as a terminal freight station at Pulau Indah

The estimated date of completion was also extended for more than two years to the end of December 2026, compared to the originally targeted date of June 2024.

=== Second realignment ===
Due to another change of government from Pakatan Harapan to Perikatan Nasional in 2020, the Perikatan Nasional government reverted the ECRL route back to its original alignment.

In March 2021, the second realignment is confirmed with the reversion of the alignment to its original alignment with added improvement by passing through Serendah and linking Port Klang with West and North Port. The decision was said to enable the construction of a meter gauge bypass line from Serendah to Port Klang for Keretapi Tanah Melayu Bhd (KTMB) to be included into the new ECRL alignment. Section C alignment from Serendah - Port Klang will be on dual gauge (MRL - 1,435 mm (4 ft 8 1/2 in), KTM - 1,000 mm (3 ft 3 3/8 in)). The bypass line will make the KTMB rail services more efficient as it serves as a significant freight relief line to the KTMB which currently faces bottlenecks when traversing Kuala Lumpur's central business district (CBD) and relieves the concerns for public safety as KTMB cargo containing hazardous materials need to go through KL Sentral, Bank Negara and several other stations due to the freight congestion.

This latest realignment will add 25 more kilometers of rail tracks totaling to 665 km. The first section from Kota Bharu to Gombak will be completed by December 2026. The section between Gombak Utara to Port Klang is targeted to be completed by January 2028. The northern extension from Kota Bharu to the Sungai Golok border is in discussion with Thai's authority as technical study is undergoing.

The alignment was confirmed on 2 December 2021 after the Selangor state government agreed to having the original northern alignment known as Section C. The project cost remains unchanged at RM50.27b, with supplementary agreements signed to formalise the alignment.

=== Stations ===
The project provides 20 core stations, with additional proposed extensions to the north and potential future spurlines. The stations comprise passenger-only facilities and combined passenger and freight stations.

List of East Coast Rail Link Stations
Code	Station Name	State	District	Local Authority	Hierarchy	Type	Notes / Interchange	Coordinates
North Extension (Proposed)
—	Pengkalan Kubur	Kelantan	Tumpat	Tumpat	Suburban	Passenger		6°12′45.89″N 102°5′46.40″E
—	Wakaf Bharu	Kelantan	Tumpat	Tumpat	Regional	Passenger & Freight	Proposed connection to KTM East Coast Line	6°7′28.68″N 102°10′39.51″E
Section A (Kota Bharu – Dungun)
A_01	Kota Bharu	Kelantan	Kota Bharu	Ketereh Perbandaran Islam	Regional	Passenger	Proposed integration with Kota Bharu Sentral	6°3′8″N 102°14′0″E
A_02	Pasir Puteh	Kelantan	Pasir Puteh	Pasir Puteh	Suburban	Passenger & Freight		5°48′19″N 102°21′56″E
A_03	Jerteh	Terengganu	Besut	Besut	Suburban	Passenger		5°42′2″N 102°29′1″E
A_04	Bandar Permaisuri	Terengganu	Setiu	Setiu	Suburban	Passenger		5°31′17″N 102°44′14″E
A_05	Kuala Terengganu	Terengganu	Marang	Marang	Urban	Passenger		5°10′19″N 103°5′56″E
—	Pengkalan Berangan	Terengganu	Marang	Marang	Suburban	Passenger	Proposed	5°5′22″N 103°9′15″E
A_06	Dungun	Terengganu	Dungun	Dungun	Suburban	Passenger & Freight		4°44′20″N 103°23′5″E
Section B (Dungun – Mentakab)
B_01	Kemasik	Terengganu	Kemaman	Kemaman	Suburban	Passenger		
B_02	Chukai	Terengganu	Kemaman	Kemaman	Suburban	Passenger & Freight		
B_03	Cherating	Pahang	Kuantan	Kuantan	Urban	Passenger		
B_04	Kuantan Port City	Pahang	Kuantan	Kuantan	Suburban	Passenger & Freight		
B_05	KotaSAS	Pahang	Kuantan	Kuantan	Regional	Passenger		
B_06	Paya Besar	Pahang	Kuantan	Kuantan	Suburban	Passenger & Freight		
B_07	Maran	Pahang	Maran	Maran	Urban Neighbourhood	Passenger & Freight		
Section C (Northern Alignment)
C_01	Temerloh	Pahang	Temerloh	Temerloh	Urban	Passenger & Freight	KTM West Coast Line	3°25′21.76″N 102°22′58.27″E
C_02	Bentong	Pahang	Bentong	Bentong	Suburban	Passenger & Freight		
C_03	ITT Gombak	Selangor	Gombak	Selayang	Regional	Passenger	5 Gombak LRT station	
C_04	Bandar Serendah	Selangor	Hulu Selangor	Hulu Selangor	Urban	Passenger & Freight	KTM West Coast Line (Bypass)	3°21′51.93″N 101°35′19.36″E
C_05	Puncak Alam	Selangor	Kuala Selangor	Kuala Selangor	Suburban	Passenger		3°14′55.31″N 101°24′42.42″E
C_06	Kapar	Selangor	Klang	Klang	Suburban	Passenger		3°7′30″N 101°23′39.86″E
C_07	Jalan Kastam	Selangor	Klang	Klang	Regional	Passenger & Freight	Port Klang Line	3°0′55.16″N 101°24′11.85″E
Southern Spurline (Proposed/Legacy Alignment)
—	Kemasul	Pahang	Bentong	Bentong	—	Passenger		3°15′10.73″N 102°14′23.73″E
—	Klawang	Negeri Sembilan	Jelebu	Jelebu	—	Passenger		2°58′24.90″N 102°3′9.07″E
—	Nilai Sentral	Negeri Sembilan	Seremban	Seremban	—	Passenger	Nilai Komuter station	2°51′35.84″N 101°49′11.22″E
—	Putrajaya Sentral	Putrajaya	—	Putrajaya	—	Passenger	Putrajaya Sentral	2°55′52.19″N 101°40′13.45″E
—	Jenjarom	Selangor	Kuala Langat	Kuala Langat	—	Passenger & Freight		2°53′50.80″N 101°30′21.60″E
—	Westport	Selangor	Klang	Klang	—	Freight		

== Project background ==
The project forms part of China's Belt and Road Initiative. On 15 March 2016, Suruhanjaya Pengangkutan Awam Darat (SPAD) and East Coast Economic Region Development Council (ECERDC), conducting a marketing exercise to gauge market interest, and seek views and ideas for the ECRL via a Request for Information (RFI).

In November 2016, a framework finance deal and construction agreement, valued at USD13.1 billion, was signed by the Malaysian Government and the state-owned China Communications Construction Company Ltd (CCCC). The deal was criticised by Prime Minister Mahathir Mohamad as being lopsided. "When it involves giving contracts to China, borrowing huge sums of money from China, and the contract goes to China, and China contractors prefer to use their own workers from China, use everything imported from China, even the payment is not made here, it's made in China ... that kind of contract is not something that I welcome".

Starting 8 March 2017, the plan is opened for public inspection for three months at Land Public Transport Commission (SPAD) head office and 38 other locations including district offices.

The 3-month Public Inspection for Phase One of the ECRL received some 95 percent approval from 17,000 respondents across 15 east coast districts. SPAD had granted approval for Phase One of the ECRL railway schedule on 23 June 2017 which covers about 600 km of track. An Environmental Impact Assessment Report for the ECRL has also been completed and endorsed by the Department of Environment on 20 June 2017.

On 9 August 2017, then Prime Minister Najib Razak presided at the groundbreaking ceremony in Pahang state, marking the beginning of construction. He said "The construction of this rail link is in line with the government's initiative for efficient national infrastructure as well as connecting towns and upgrading public transport in the rural areas of the east coast."

Upon the change of government due to the 2018 Malaysian general election, the newly-elected Pakatan Harapan government initially decided to cancel the project citing high cost as the main factor. However, instead of being cancelled, the ECRL route was realigned with major changes made on the Section C route between Port Klang and Mentakab, Pahang.

After the fall of Pakatan Harapan government due to the Sheraton move, the new Perikatan Nasional-led government planned to revert the ECRL route back to its original alignment. On 5 April 2021, the Transport ministry announced the realignment of the Section C route back to its original alignment. It was pointed out that the realignment does not fully follow the original alignment with a few changes to avoid the Gombak Quartz Ridge and the Batu Dam area.

== Rolling stock ==
=== Passenger trains ===
Originally, passenger services were operated by a fleet of 11 sets of six-car CJ6-type EMUs, each accommodating up to 440 passengers. The trains will be eco-friendly and produce less noise than other EMUs. The passenger service will only run with the maximum speed of 160 kph. In 2020, promotional material by China Communications Construction Company (CCCC) has changed this to the CR200J electric trainsets. As of November 2024, the 6-Car CR200J trainset made up of an electric locomotive, four matching carriages featuring Business Class and Economy Class seats and a cab car is to be delivered by the end of December 2025, said Anthony Loke.

Class	Image	Top speed		Number	Remarks	Built
Class	Image	mph	km/h	Number	Remarks	Built
ECRL CR200J EMU push–pull train		99	160	11 trainsets (ordered/delivered): 11 power cars (Mc); 44 passenger carriages (T); 11 cab cars (Tc)	6-car Power Concentrated Electric Multiple Unit (EMU) push-pull trainsets featuring 1 electric locomotive power car, 4 unpowered passenger carriages (featuring Business Class and Economy Class seats), and 1 unpowered cab car (Mc-4T-Tc formation). Operating on the East Coast Rail Link with 25 kV AC railway electrification.	2024–2025

==== Formation ====
Car Position	Car Type	Driver's Cab	Traction / Propulsion	Key Equipment & Operational Notes
Car 1	Locomotive (Mc)	Yes (Leading Cab)	Yes (Powered)	Electric locomotive unit housing main traction systems, power control equipment and the primary driving cab.
Cars 2–5	Carriage (T)	No	No (Unpowered)	Passenger seating carriages featuring Business Class and Economy Class configurations.
Car 6	Cab Car (Tc)	Yes (Trailing Cab)	No (Unpowered)	Trailer cab car featuring a secondary driver's compartment enabling push-pull operations.

=== Rail freight locomotive ===
The China Railways HXD3CA electric locomotive is capable of hauling up to 45 wagons with 3500 tonnes of cargo. A fleet of 18 sets of these locomotives features container wagons, box wagons and open wagons.

=== Construction rolling stock ===
The China Railways DF8B diesel locomotives used to assist in construction activities for the track laying which began on 11 December 2023, The purpose for this locomotive is to fill the ballast of the track. All six customised diesel locomotives measuring 22m in length with a maximum speed of 100km per hour which arrived on 23 October 2023 will facilitate the transportation of track materials. Also, a CCPG500A track laying rolling stock, a Ballast Tamping Machine, Rail Heater, etc., have arrived on 4 December 2023.

== Owner and operator ==
The ECRL will be owned by Malaysia Rail Link Sdn Bhd (MRL), a special purpose entity wholly owned by the Minister of Finance (Incorporated) (MoF Inc). It will be jointly operated and maintained by a 50:50 joint-venture between MRL and CCCC.

== See also ==
- Malaysian national projects
- Rail transport in Malaysia
- LCR Boten–Vientiane railway
- CR Yuxi–Mohan railway
- Thai Canal
