= Glenmarie Komuter station =

Proposed railway station in Subang, Selangor, Malaysia

Glenmarie

General information
- Location: Subang, Selangor; Malaysia
- System: commuter rail halt
- Owner: Keretapi Tanah Melayu
- Line: 10 KL Sentral–Terminal Skypark Line (KTM Komuter)
- Platforms: 2 side platforms
- Tracks: 2

Other information
- Station code: N/A

Glenmarie Komuter station is a proposed KTM Komuter commuter train halt located in Subang, Selangor, Malaysia. The halt will be built as part of the Subang Skypark extension line, branching off from the Port Klang Line at Subang Jaya Komuter station and ending at Subang Skypark Komuter station.

Despite sharing the same name, the commuter halt will not be an interchange with Glenmarie LRT Station on the Kelana Jaya Line extension, which is located approximately 2.6 km away near Kelana Business Centre.
