= Sri Subang Komuter station =

Proposed railway station in Malaysia

Sri Subang

General information
- Location: Subang, Selangor; Malaysia
- System: commuter rail halt
- Owner: Keretapi Tanah Melayu
- Line: 10 KL Sentral–Terminal Skypark Line (KTM Komuter)
- Platforms: 2 side platforms
- Tracks: 2

Other information
- Station code: N/A

Sri Subang Komuter station is a proposed KTM Komuter commuter train halt located in Subang, Selangor, Malaysia. The halt will be built as part of the Subang Skypark extension line, branching off from the Port Klang Line at Subang Jaya Komuter station and ending at Subang Skypark Komuter station.
