= List of ambassadors of Malaysia to Russia =

Ambassador of Malaysia to Russia
- Incumbent; Bala Chandran Tharman since 2020
- Style: His Excellency
- Seat: Moscow, Russia
- Appointer: Yang di-Pertuan Agong
- Inaugural holder: Zaiton Ibrahim Ahmad
- Formation: 6 October 1968
- Website: www.kln.gov.my/web/rus_moscow/home

The ambassador of Malaysia to the Russian Federation is the head of Malaysia's diplomatic mission to Russia. The position has the rank and status of an ambassador extraordinary and plenipotentiary and is based in the Embassy of Malaysia, Moscow.

== History ==
- Malaysia and the Soviet Union established diplomatic relations on 3 April 1967, and the first ambassador was posted to Moscow on 6 October 1968.

== List of heads of mission ==
=== Ambassadors to the Soviet Union ===
Ambassador	Term start	Term end
Zaiton Ibrahim Ahmad	6 October 1968	15 November 1970
Tengku Ngah Mohammed Tengku Sri Akar	4 April 1971	27 December 1973
Raja Aznam Raja Ahmad	10 May 1974	17 June 1977
Zainal Abidin Sulong	14 October 1977	16 July 1980
K. Tharmaratnam	4 November 1980	18 January 1983
Dali Mohd Hashim	9 June 1983	6 April 1986
M. M. Sathiah	8 May 1986	3 July 1989
Mohammed Haron	24 July 1989	25 December 1991

=== Ambassadors to Russia ===
Ambassador	Term start	Term end
Mohammed Haron	25 December 1991	3 November 1993
Yahya Baba	6 December 1993	7 December 2001
Kamarudin Mustafa	3 January 2002	2 April 2005
Mohamad Khalis	10 June 2005	30 June 2010
Zainol Abidin Omar	12 October 2010	5 July 2015
Hayati Ismail	29 October 2015	9 June 2017
Mat Dris Yaacob	18 September 2017	11 January 2020
Bala Chandran Tharman	9 August 2020	7 September 2022
Cheong Loon Lai	31 January 2024	incumbent

== See also ==
- Malaysia–Soviet Union relations
- Malaysia–Russia relations
