= Malaysia–Russia relations =

- Malaysia: Russia

Diplomatic mission
- Malaysian Embassy, Moscow: Russian Embassy, Kuala Lumpur

Envoy
- Ambassador Bala Chandran Tharman: Ambassador Valery N. Yermolov

Malaysia–Russia relations (Malay: Hubungan Malaysia–Rusia; Jawi: هوبوڠن مليسيا–روسيا; Russian: Малайзийско-российские отношения Malayziysko-rossiyskiye otnosheniya) are the bilateral foreign relations between the two countries, Malaysia and Russia. Russia has an embassy in Kuala Lumpur (from April 1968), and Malaysia has an embassy in Moscow (from November 1968).

== History ==
=== Colonial era ===
As part of World War I, the Russian cruiser Zhemchug was sunk by the German cruiser SMS Emden off Penang in the British Straits Settlements. Some Malay fishermen risked their own lives to rescue any surviving crewmen from the cruiser.

=== Soviet era ===
The Soviet Union established diplomatic relations with Malaysia on 3 April 1967 along with the signing of a trade agreement. Following the opening of official trade relations between the two countries, the Soviet Trade Representation was established in November 1967. In 1970, the first group of Soviet students came to study Malay at the University of Malaya, among them Tatiana Dorofeeva, Tamara Reshetova, Victor A. Pogadaev and Anatoly Voronkov.

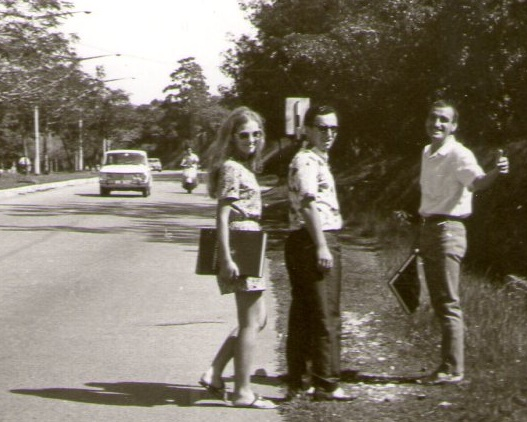
The first Russian students at the University of Malaya, Kuala Lumpur.

Ties between the two suffered when Malaysia declared its support for Islamic Unity of Afghanistan Mujahideen against the Soviet invasion to prop-up the Democratic Republic of Afghanistan throughout the 1980s. Malaysia also joined the US-led boycott of the 1980 Summer Olympics as part of their opposition of the invasion of a fellow Islamic country. Throughout the Cold War, relations between Malaysia and the Soviet Union were tense over the latter's role in the Vietnam War and Soviet intervention in the Indian Ocean, which Malaysia felt could lead to the fulfillment of the domino theory, as the nation struggled with three communists insurgency itself; the Malayan Emergency, Second Malayan Emergency and the Sarawak Communist Insurgency.

However, relations between the two recovered following the end of the Soviet-Afghan war, and both countries worked to repair diplomatic, economic, and military ties under Mikhail Gorbachev and Mahathir Mohamad. Several Malaysian Prime Ministers have made official visits to Moscow throughout the Cold War, including Tun Abdul Razak in 1972 and Mahathir Mohamad in 1985 and 1987. Diplomatic relations between Malaysia and the Soviet Union were maintained until the dissolution of the Soviet Union on 26 December 1991.

=== Post Soviet Union ===
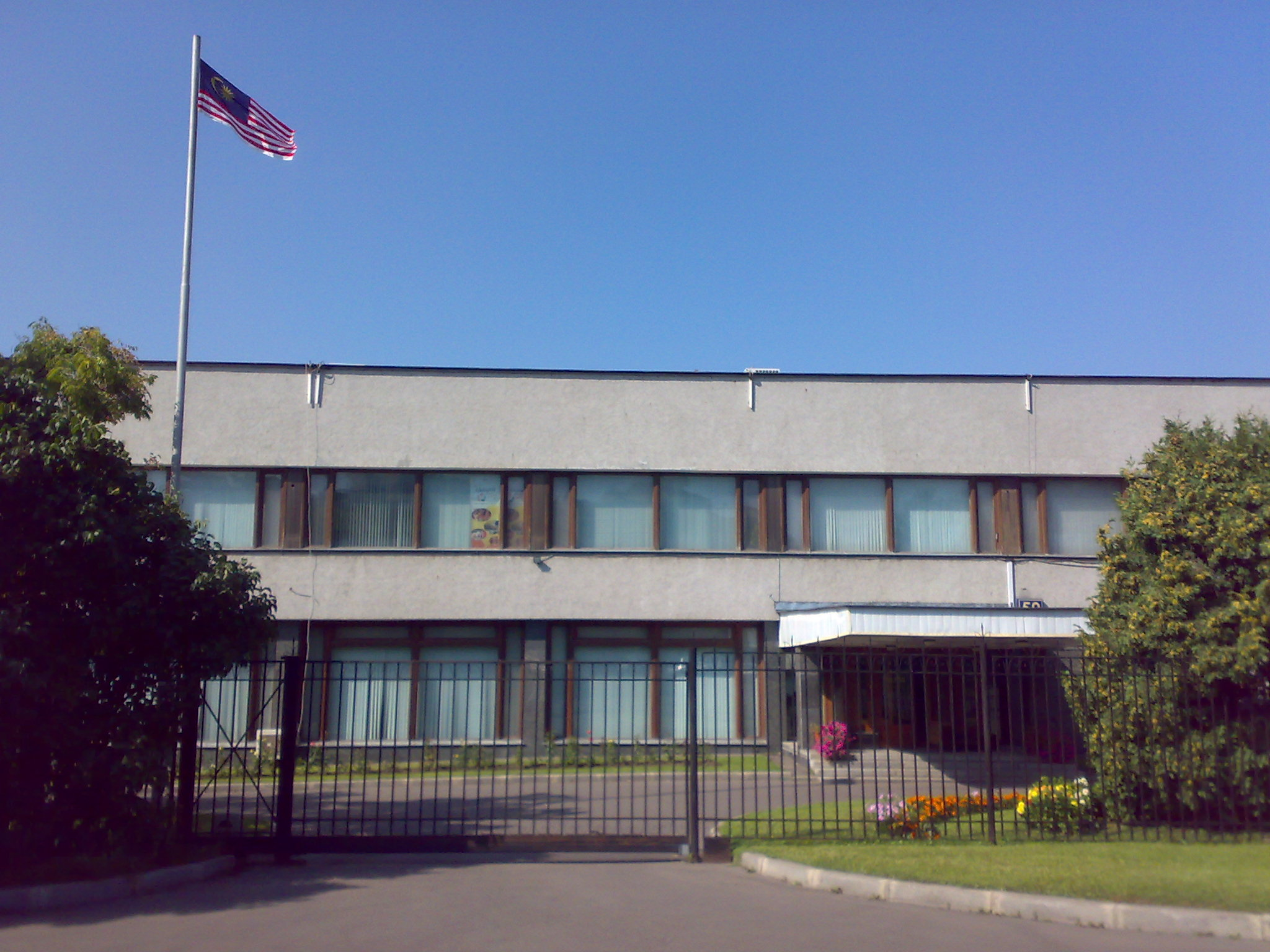
Malaysian embassy in Moscow.

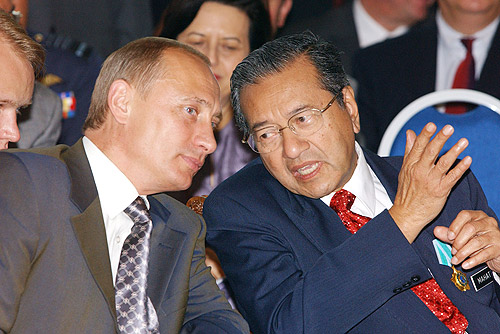
Prime Minister of Malaysia Mahathir Mohamad with President of Russia Vladimir Putin in Putrajaya, 5 August 2003

In the modern times, several visits have been made between leaders of respective countries. Tuanku Ja'afar, the then-Yang di-Pertuan Agong, or King of Malaysia made an unofficial visit to St. Petersburg in May 1997. In 1999, Mahathir made a working visit to the Russian regions of Khabarovsk Krai and Buryatia. Another visit by Mahathir to Moscow was made in 2002. At the Asia-Pacific Economic Cooperation (APEC Summits) in Brunei (November 2000) and Shanghai (October 2001) and Group of Eight (G8 Summit) in Evian (June 2003), there were informal meetings between Russian President Vladimir Putin and Malaysian Prime Minister Mahathir.

Putin visited Malaysia twice in 2003 (one as an official visit in August) and to attend the Organisation of Islamic Cooperation (OIC) Summit in October. During his official visit, Putin conferred the Order of Friendship to Mahathir in recognition of his contribution to strengthening the friendly ties between the two countries and to the cause of global stability and inter-religious accord while a contract was signed to supply the Royal Malaysian Air Force (RMAF) with 18 Russian Sukhoi Su-30MKM fighter aircraft. Another visit from Malaysia was made by Tuanku Sirajuddin in September 2005. Putin participated in the first Russia-ASEAN Summit in Kuala Lumpur and had a bilateral meeting with Malaysian Prime Minister Abdullah Ahmad Badawi in December 2005. Abdullah later made an official visit to Moscow in June 2007. Mahathir considered Russia to become a future rival to the United States and Israel and praised Putin for criticizing and standing up to American and Western interference in other sovereign states.

In 2012, Malaysian Prime Minister Najib Razak met Putin during the Asia-Pacific Economic Co-operation summit in Russia to expand trade relations and to discover other opportunities for business partnership. Another meeting was held in 2016 with the intention to expand trade, including establishing direct flights and exploring a free trade agreement (FTA) to enhance bilateral trade and tourist arrivals.

In 2014, an Amsterdam-to-Kuala Lumpur Malaysia Airlines plane crashed in the Russian-occupied area of Ukraine after it was shot at. The majority of people on board were Malaysians, though there were also other nationalities. No one survived. A few years later, a Dutch court found three Russian agents two Russian nationals and one Ukrainian defector guilty. However, it is unlikely that they will ever serve their sentences.

On early August 2019 the Russian Embassy in Kuala Lumpur was one of those affected by two online bomb threats which were posted on Twitter; the other being KL Sentral which is the capital city's transport hub. The aforementioned threats were posted via a hacked account by an individual calling himself "limzhengyan"; as a result the Malaysian police has carried out a search on those locations and determined that the threats were phony, although incidentally on the same day an incomplete improvised explosive device was found at the Bukit Damansara area.

Years later, Mahathir (now out of public office at such point in time) turned against Putin and went on to criticize and condemn the Russian invasion of Ukraine after 24 February 2022, stating that "the Malaysian government cannot be supporting those who would utilize war and aggression as a justification to resolve conflicts between two opposing countries" and "Today we have witnessed that Russia has used war to capture and solve problems, we cannot support those who use war as a weapon to a solution," he added. "Any dispute or rivalry between two governments should be resolved through negotiations, courts of law... that is the best way, not war. Russia seems to be doing the opposite when it comes to using the military to resolve their dispute with Ukraine."

== Economic relations ==
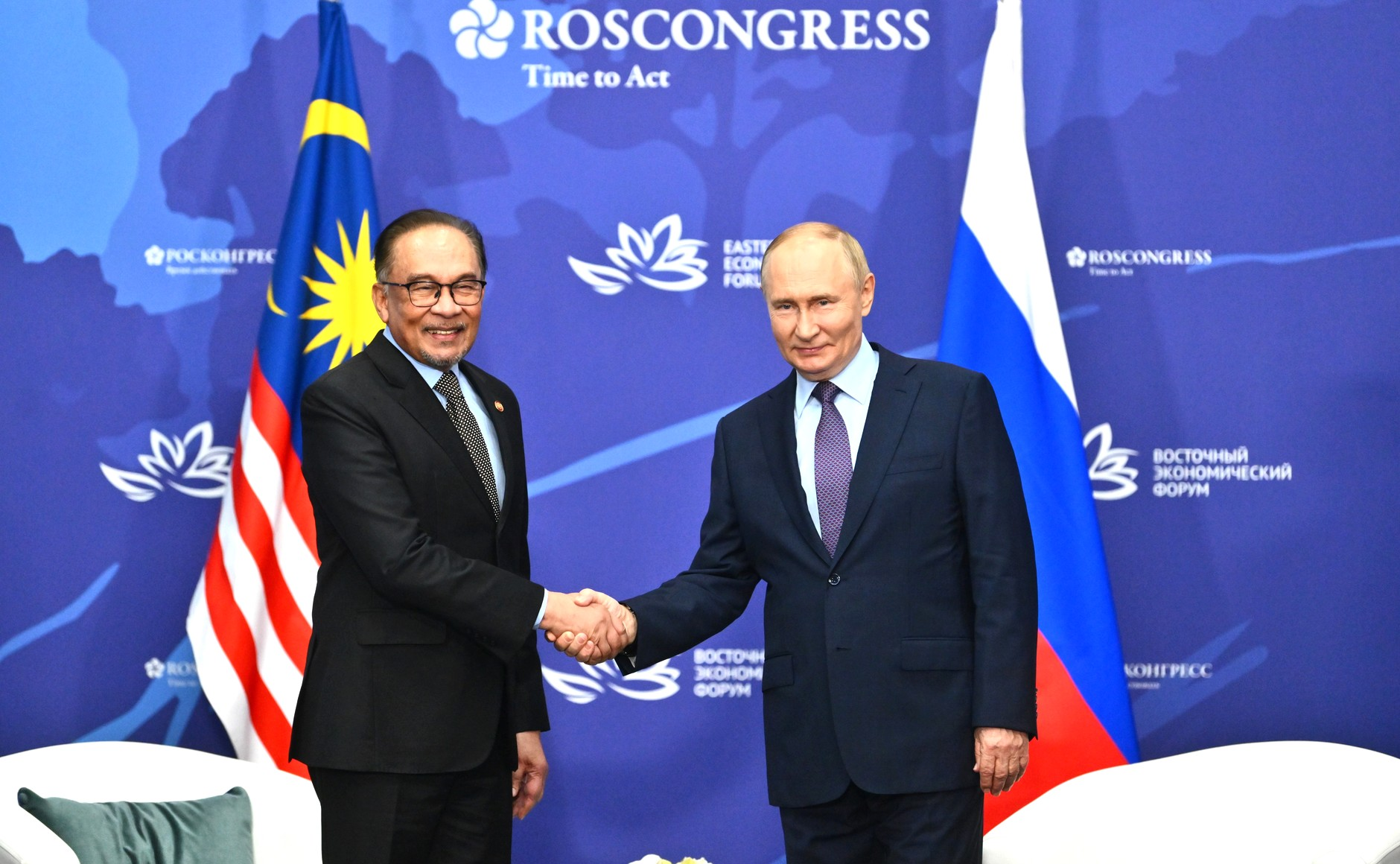
Malaysian Prime Minister Anwar Ibrahim and Russian President Vladimir Putin at the Eastern Economic Forum in Primorsky Krai, Russia, 4 September 2024

In 2012, around 40,000 Russian tourists visited Malaysia, and the Malaysian government expressed its intent to further increase the number of Russian tourists through the establishment of direct flights between the two countries. Trade between the two countries in 2016 valued around US$2.2 billion. On 15 March 2016, a Russian-Malaysian business council was established with the intent to strengthen cooperation on economic, scientific, technological issues and culture.

== Security relations and collaboration in science field ==
On 19 May 2007, Jamaluddin Jarjis then Malaysia's Minister of Science, Technology and Innovation announced that two Malaysian candidates for astronauts (Faiz Khaleed and Sheikh Muszaphar Shukor) will undergo training in Moscow as part of a billion-dollar deal for 18 Sukhoi Su-30MKM fighter jets. These astronauts brought along cancer cells, bacteria and protein for studies in space. One of the two candidates, Sheikh Muszaphar succeeded in the training and was sent to the International Space Station (ISS) as part of the Angkasawan program for the Malaysian National Space Agency (MNSA) and the Russian Federal Space Agency (Roscosmos). The mission was a success and Sheikh Muszaphar became the first Malaysian national to travel to space. In 2016, Malaysia acknowledged Russia's strength in the military and aerospace sector and sought their help in the expansion of those sectors in Malaysia. In 2018, Russia set a branch office of the Russian Centre of Science and Culture (RCSC) in Kota Kinabalu to expand the existing co-operation between Malaysia and Russia in the fields of economy, culture and science.

In October 2024, corvettes Aldar Tsydenzhapov, Gromkiy and Rezkiy, along with replenishment oiler Pechanga, docked in George Town where the crews attended a ceremony to commemorate the 110th anniversary of the Battle of Penang. The following month in 20 November, the Russian Navy's Project 636.3 Ufa diesel-electric submarine and rescue tug Alatau made a business call at the port of Kota Kinabalu where both the Russian and Malaysian navies are set to conduct the PASSEX joint drills in the South China Sea.

== Public opinion ==
In June 2022, a public opinion survey conducted by the Pew Research Center found that 47% of Malaysians had a favourable view of Russia while 30% of Malaysians had a somewhat unfavourable view of Russia and 20% had a very unfavourable view of Russia, making it the only country surveyed where majority of Malaysian expresses their confidence on Russia and its leader.

== See also ==
- List of ambassadors of Russia to Malaysia
