= KL Sentral–Terminal Skypark Line =

Railway line in Malaysia

KTM KL Sentral–Terminal Skypark Line

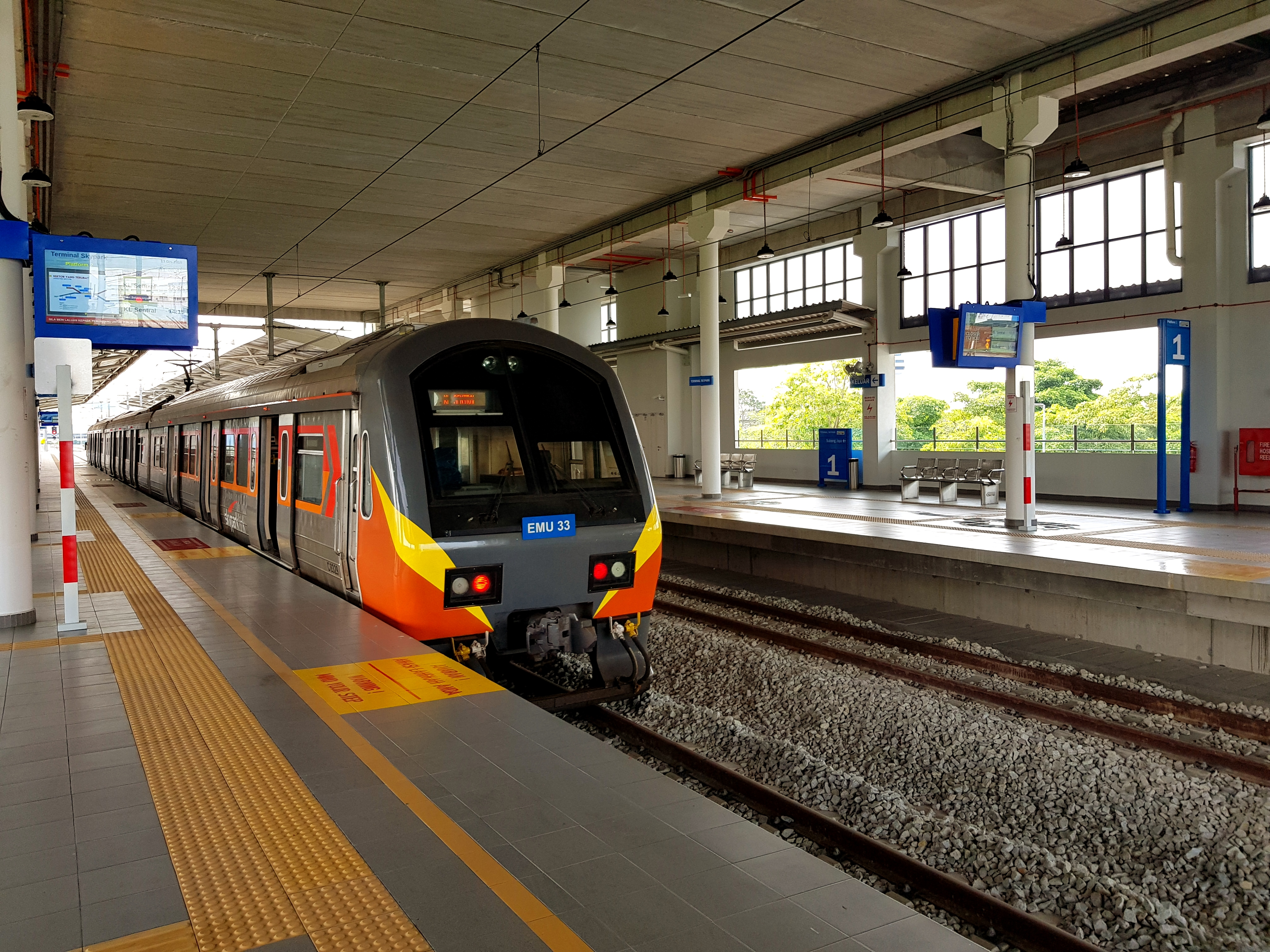
- KL Sentral–Terminal Skypark Line train set at Terminal Skypark station.

Overview
- Native name: KTM Laluan KL Sentral–Terminal Skypark
- Status: Suspended
- Owner: Keretapi Tanah Melayu
- Line number: 10 (brown)
- Locale: Kuala Lumpur – Subang Jaya – Subang Airport
- Termini: KS01 KL Sentral; KS03 Terminal Skypark
- Stations: 3 + 2 reserve stations
- Website: www.ktmb.com.my/Skypark.html

Service
- Type: Commuter rail (Airport rail link); Limited express
- System: KTM Komuter; Klang Valley Integrated Transit System
- Operator: Keretapi Tanah Melayu
- Depot: Sentul
- Rolling stock: KTM Class 83 EMU; Four 3-car trainsets

History
- Opened: 1 May 2018; 8 years ago
- Closed: 15 February 2023; 3 years ago

Technical
- Line length: 26 km (16 mi)
- Character: Ground and elevated
- Track gauge: 1,000 mm (3 ft 3 3/8 in) metre gauge
- Electrification: 25 kV 50 Hz AC overhead line
- Conduction system: With driver
- Operating speed: Up to 100 km/h

The KTM KL Sentral–Terminal Skypark Line (formerly known as the Skypark Link) is a currently suspended limited express train service in Kuala Lumpur, Malaysia between Kuala Lumpur Sentral (KL Sentral) and Sultan Abdul Aziz Shah Airport (Subang Airport). It is Malaysia's second airport rail link service, after the Express Rail Link system (KLIA Ekspres and KLIA Transit).

Operated by Keretapi Tanah Melayu (KTM), the service shares the same tracks as the Tanjung Malim–Port Klang Line between KL Sentral and Subang Jaya, after which it branches off to head towards Subang Airport. Ordinary Tanjung Malim–Port Klang Line trains stop at all stations between KL Sentral and Subang Jaya, while the KL Sentral–Terminal Skypark Line runs non-stop between them. One new station, the Terminal Skypark station, located opposite Subang Airport, was built to serve the line. Two reserve stations were planned between Subang Jaya and Terminal Skypark, but are currently not constructed.

The line is one of the components of the Klang Valley Integrated Transit System. It is numbered 10 and colored brown on official transit maps.

Services have been temporarily suspended since 15 February 2023 due to low ridership, with the funds to operate the service said to be reallocated to KTMB's MyRailLife program enabling students and disabled folks to ride for free. The trainsets are redeployed to serve the KTM Komuter Northern Sector. The service will only be resumed on a new model once the Subang Airport terminal finishes its refurbishment under the Subang Airport Regeneration Plan (SARP).

== Line information ==
KL Sentral–Terminal Skypark Line board in KL Sentral

=== Route ===
Location of Skypark Link

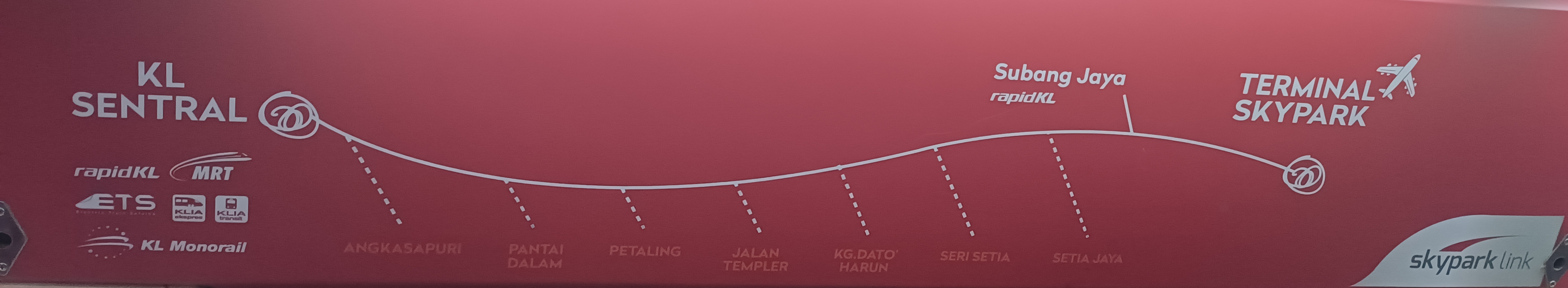
KL Sentral–Terminal Skypark Line route map showing the skipped stations

The 26 km (16 mi) KL Sentral-Terminal Skypark Line commenced operations on 1 May 2018 and runs between KL Sentral and Subang Skypark with a stop in Subang Jaya. In contrast to ordinary Port Klang Line services, after leaving Subang Jaya, the KL Sentral-Terminal Skypark Line skips all stations between Setia Jaya and Abdullah Hukum, both stations inclusive.

The journey time from KL Sentral to Subang Skypark is 30 minutes.

Operations began on 1 May 2018 with free rides available until the end of the year. Free rides were only provided for trips that begin or end at Terminal Skypark; no free rides were given for trips between KL Sentral and Subang Jaya only.

=== Stations ===
The three stations served by the KL Sentral-Terminal Skypark Line are, from east to west:

Station code	Station name	Platform type	Interchange station/Notes
KS01	KL Sentral	Terminus (Island)	Northern terminus. Interchange station with KA01 Batu Caves–Pulau Sebang Line, Tanjung Malim–Port Klang Line and KTM ETS. Connecting station to: KJ15 LRT Kelana Jaya Line; KE1 KT1 ERL KLIA Ekspres and ERL KLIA Transit; Linkbridge access to MR1 KL Sentral Monorail on the KL Monorail via NU Sentral shopping mall; Linkbridge access to KG15 Muzium Negara on the MRT Kajang Line; Feeder bus T819 to KG13 Pusat Bandar Damansara on the MRT Kajang Line.
KS02	Subang Jaya	Side	Connecting station to KJ28 LRT Kelana Jaya Line. Cross-platform interchange to KD09 Tanjung Malim–Port Klang Line.
KS02A	Glenmarie	-	reserve station
KS02B	Sri Subang	-	reserve station
KS03	Terminal Skypark	Terminus (Side)	Western terminus. Pedestrian access to Sultan Abdul Aziz Shah Airport (Subang Airport). Feeder bus T804 to KG05 Kwasa Sentral on the MRT Kajang Line.

=== Frequency ===
Services were suspended between March 2020 and October 2021 due to the Coronavirus pandemic. Services were restored on 15 October 2021. Services were suspended again from 15 February 2023 due to low ridership.

There were 25 services a day: 12 trips from KL Sentral to the airport, and 13 trips from the airport to KL Sentral.

== Rolling stock ==
interior seats of KL Sentral–Terminal Skypark Line trains

interior seats of KL Sentral–Terminal Skypark Line trains

The service used four refurbished KTM Class 83 electric multiple units (EMUs). The original blue and yellow KTM Komuter livery was changed to grey and orange. The trains had a capacity of 300 passengers.

== Background ==
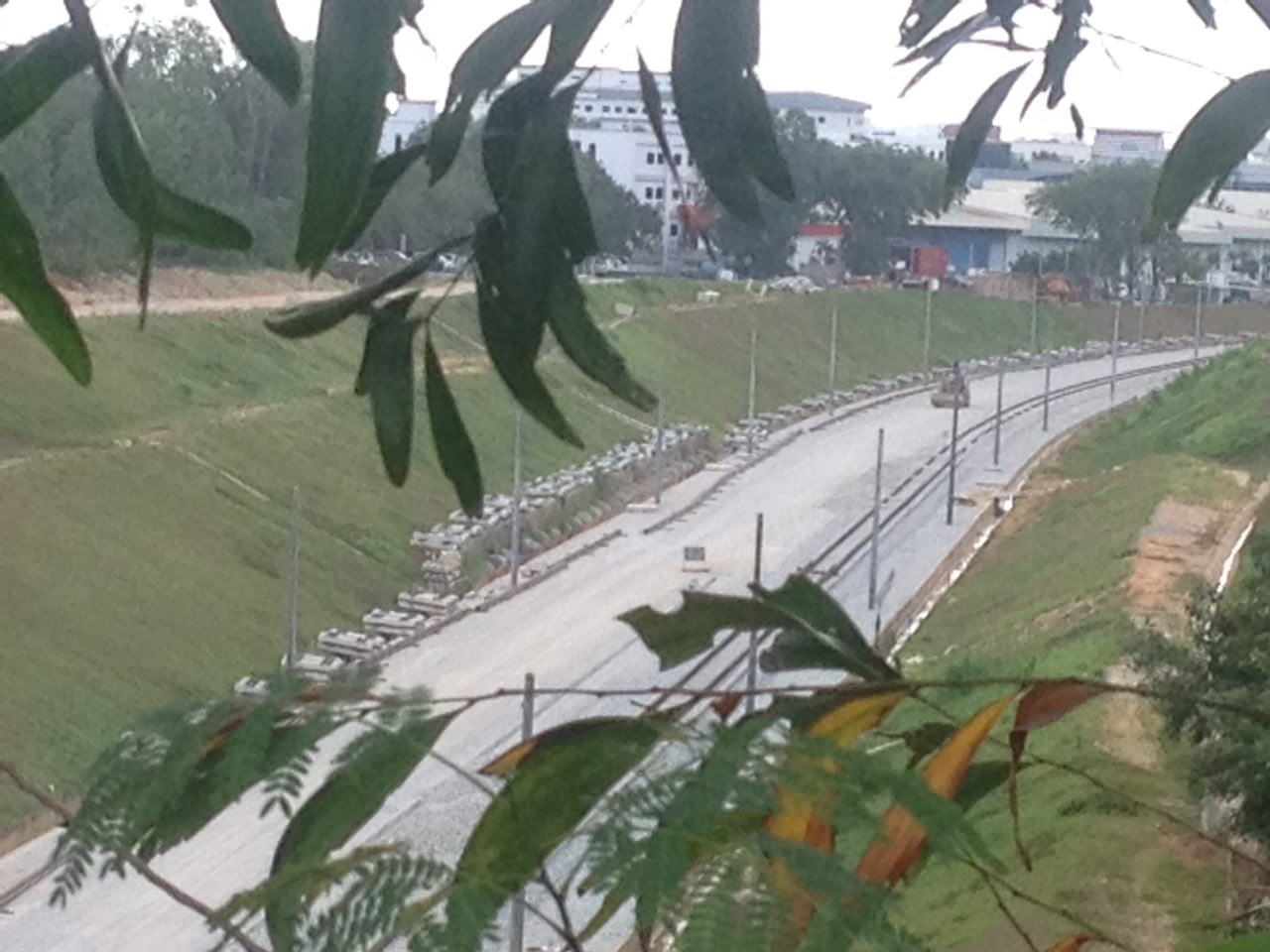
The rail track being constructed, taken from Malaysia Federal Route 3213

The Electrified Double Tracking Project consists of two phases: Phase 1 between Subang Jaya and Subang Skypark, which was awarded to Konsortium Skypark Link–Lion Pacific Sdn Bhd, and Phase 2 from Subang Skypark, through Kampung Melayu Subang and Ladang Elmina and ending at Sungai Buloh station to allow rail cargo traffic to bypass downtown Kuala Lumpur.. However, reports state that alternative plans, including an extension of the ECRL to Serendah instead of extending the KL Sentral-Terminal Skypark Line, were being studied.

The construction of the link was funded by the Ministry of Transport to provide rail-based public transport to connect the Sultan Abdul Aziz Shah (SAAS) Airport and its vicinity with the existing KTM railway. The RM521 million rail link was commissioned in 2013 with an initial completion date in 2016, but this was later extended to 2018.

The project consists of two main parts: a 4.09 km (2.541 mi) at-grade section between Subang Jaya and the old Sri Subang spur line, using the existing railway reserve previously funded by Petronas to transport fuel from Port Klang to the airport, and a new 4.067 km (2.527 mi) section from the new location of the unbuilt Sri Subang station, elevated along the existing Sungai Damansara river reserve, ending at the car park just outside the airport.

KTM KL Sentral–Terminal Skypark Line Logo

== Connection with KLIA ==
The KL Sentral–Terminal Skypark Line interchanges with the Express Rail Link at KL Sentral, thus allowing a rail connection between Subang Airport and Kuala Lumpur International Airport (KLIA).

== See also ==
- Keretapi Tanah Melayu
  - KTM Intercity & KTM ETS
    - KTM West Coast Line
    - KTM East Coast Line
  - KTM Komuter
    - Batu Caves–Pulau Sebang Line
    - KL Sentral–Terminal Skypark Line
    - Northern Sector
    - Southern Sector
- Public transport in Kuala Lumpur
