= List of ambassadors of Russia to Brunei =

Ambassador of the Russian Federation to Brunei Darussalam
- Emblem of the Russian Foreign Ministry
- Incumbent; Mikhail Baranov since 17 January 2023
- Ministry of Foreign Affairs; Embassy of Russia in Bandar Seri Begawan
- Style: His Excellency; The Honourable
- Reports to: Minister of Foreign Affairs
- Seat: Bandar Seri Begawan
- Appointer: President of Russia
- Term length: At the pleasure of the president
- Website: Embassy of Russia in Brunei Darussalam

The ambassador extraordinary and plenipotentiary of the Russian Federation to Brunei Darussalam is the official representative of the president and the government of the Russian Federation to the sultan and the government of Brunei.

The ambassador and his staff work at large in the Embassy of Russia in Bandar Seri Begawan. The post of Russian ambassador to Brunei is currently held by Mikhail Baranov, incumbent since 17 January 2023.

== History of diplomatic relations ==
In 1987, Soviet General Secretary Mikhail Gorbachev called for the establishment of diplomatic relations with Brunei. Although the Soviet ambassador to Singapore attempted to establish relations with Brunei in 1988, the Sultanate was unprepared to establish relations with the Communist state at the time. On 1 October 1991, Brunei established relations with the Soviet Union, and Soviet relations with the Sultanate were initially handled via the Soviet embassy in Kuala Lumpur, Malaysia. The first ambassadors to Brunei were non-resident ambassadors, accredited to Brunei in addition to their posts as ambassadors of Russia to Malaysia. The first ambassador accredited solely to Brunei was Viktor Seleznyov, appointed on 31 July 2009.

== Representatives of the Russian Federation to Brunei (1991–present) ==
Name	Title	Appointment	Termination	Notes
Anatoly Khmelnitsky	Ambassador	25 December 1991	2 November 1992	Concurrently ambassador to Malaysia
Vitaly Vorobyov	Ambassador	6 August 1993	10 August 1998	Concurrently ambassador to Malaysia
Alexey Zhukov	Ambassador	10 August 1998	26 June 2000	Concurrently ambassador to Malaysia
Vladimir Morozov	Ambassador	15 September 2000	14 April 2005	Concurrently ambassador to Malaysia
Aleksandr Karchava	Ambassador	14 April 2005	31 July 2009	Concurrently ambassador to Malaysia
Viktor Seleznyov	Ambassador	31 July 2009	30 January 2015	
Vladlen Semivolos	Ambassador	30 January 2015	26 June 2019	
Vladimir Goncharenko	Ambassador	26 June 2019	28 March 2022	
Mikhail Baranov	Ambassador	17 January 2023		
