= Hilton Kuala Lumpur =

Hotel in Kuala Lumpur, Malaysia

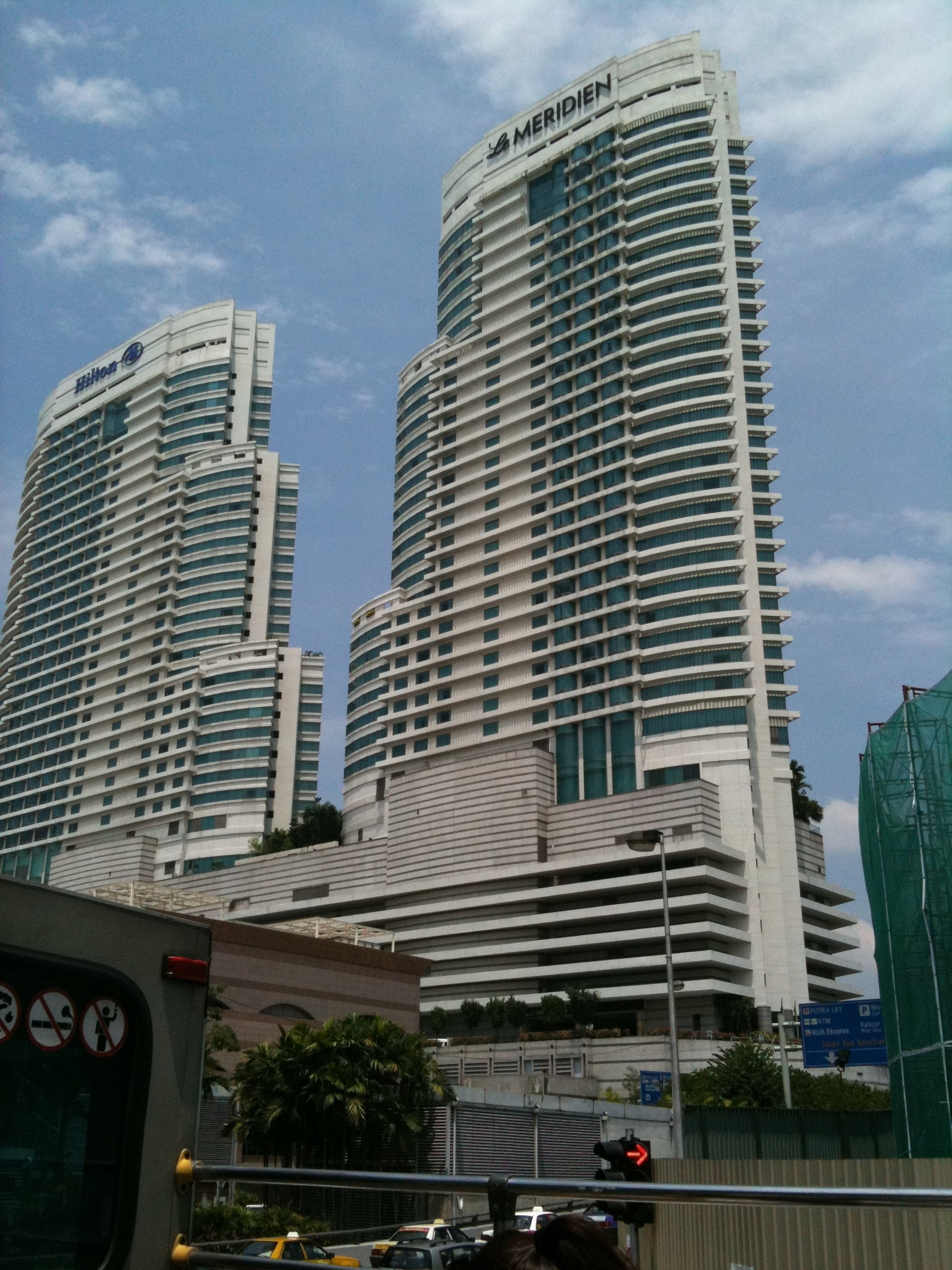
- Hilton Kuala Lumpur (above)
- Interactive map of the Hilton Kuala Lumpur area
- Hotel chain: Hilton Hotels & Resorts

General information
- Type: Hotel
- Classification: 5 stars
- Location: 3 Jalan Stesen Sentral, Kuala Lumpur, Malaysia
- Coordinates: 3.135212°N 101.685959°E
- Opened: 2004
- Owner: Hilton Worldwide

Other information
- Number of rooms: 512

Website
- Official website

Hilton Kuala Lumpur is a luxury hotel, located in Kuala Lumpur, Malaysia, and part of the Hilton Hotels & Resorts hotel chain. The hotel is situated in the Kuala Lumpur Sentral area. At a height of 154 meters with 35 floors, the hotel is the 43rd tallest building in Malaysia. It is situated next to another hotel of the French chain Le Meridien, whose building's appearance is identical.
