= Malaysia–Soviet Union relations =

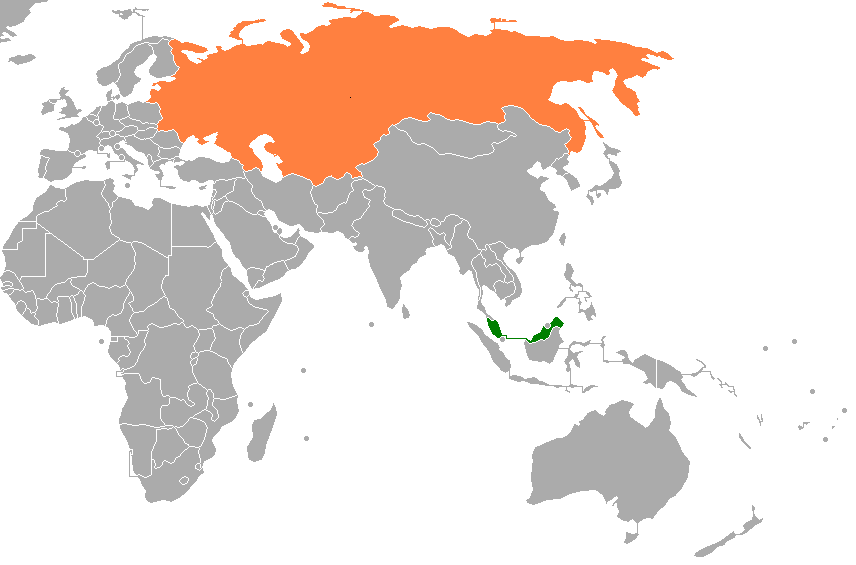

- Malaysia: Soviet Union

Malaysia–Soviet Union relations (Malay: Hubungan Kesatuan Soviet–Malaysia; Jawi: هوبوڠن كساتوان سوۏيايت–مليسيا; Russian: Малайзийско-советские отношения Malayziysko-sovetskiye otnosheniya) refers to the historical relationship between Malaysia and the Soviet Union.

== History ==
Despite Malaysia's early anti-communist foreign policy due to the Malayan Emergency, the two nations established diplomatic relations on 3 April 1967. Following the establishment of relations, Malaysia also expanded and established relations with other Soviet-influenced countries such as Poland, Romania, Hungary, Czechoslovakia, the German Democratic Republic and Yugoslavia. During the time, the Soviets were also keen to develop the relations by promoting Russian culture through the exchange of radio and television programmes, artists and in the educational field. However, throughout the Cold War, relations were often tense due to Malaysia's opposition to the Soviet invasion of Afghanistan, the Soviet role in the Vietnam War and Soviet intervention in the Indian Ocean which Malaysia felt could lead to the fulfillment of the domino theory.

== Economic relations ==
The Soviet Union was one of the largest customers of Malayan rubber during the 1950–1960 period, and replaced the United States as the largest purchaser of natural rubber with 134,000 tons purchased between January and July 1963 compared to the United States buying only 96,000 tons. However, all the purchases were made through the London market so as to avoid friction with Indonesia, who was also a producer of rubber in the region. In 1967, Malaysia also signed a trade agreement with the Soviet Union which was considered the country's first agreement with a communist country, and a prelude to full diplomatic relations.

== See also ==
- Malaysia–Russia relations
