= List of ambassadors of Russia to Malaysia =

Ambassador of the Russian Federation to Malaysia
- Emblem of the Russian Foreign Ministry

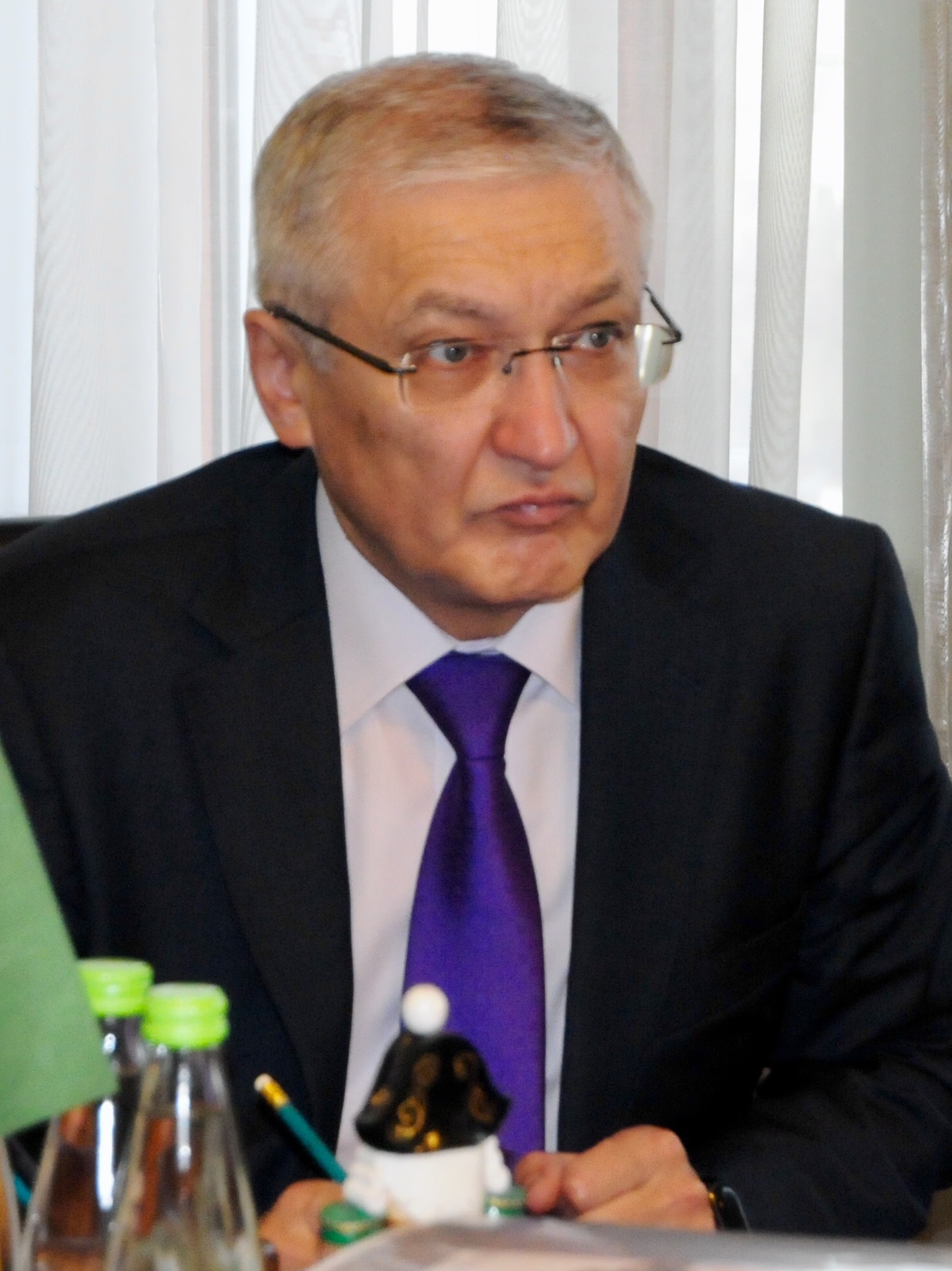
- Incumbent; Nail Latypov since 25 October 2019
- Ministry of Foreign Affairs; Embassy of Russia in Kuala Lumpur
- Style: His Excellency
- Reports to: Minister of Foreign Affairs
- Seat: Kuala Lumpur
- Appointer: President of Russia
- Term length: At the pleasure of the president
- Website: Embassy of Russia in Malaysia

The ambassador extraordinary and plenipotentiary of Russia to Malaysia is the official representative of the president and the government of the Russian Federation to the president and the government of Malaysia.

The ambassador and his staff work at large in the Embassy of Russia in Kuala Lumpur. The post of Russian ambassador to Malaysia is currently held by Nail Latypov, incumbent since 25 October 2019.

== History of diplomatic relations ==
Diplomatic relations between the Soviet Union and Malaysia were first formalized on 3 April 1967. The first ambassador, Vladimir Kuznetsov, was appointed on 9 February 1968. Representation continued throughout the existence of the Soviet Union. Towards the end of the Soviet Union's existence, the incumbent ambassador since 1988, Anatoly Khmelnitsky, was dismissed from his position by the President of the Soviet Union on 22 October 1991, being replaced simultaneously with Roza Otunbayeva. With the dissolution of the Soviet Union in December 1991, Otunbayeva chose allegiance to Kyrgyzstan, while the Russian Federation was recognised as the successor state to the Soviet Union. Otunbayeva's tenure officially came to an end on 10 February 1992, while Khmelnitsky remained nominally in post as ambassador for Russia, being dismissed a second time on 2 November 1992, this time by the President of Russia. The next ambassador, Vitaly Vorobyov, was appointed on 16 March 1993.

On 1 October 1991, Brunei established relations with the Soviet Union, and Soviet relations with the Sultanate were initially handled via the Soviet embassy in Malaysia. The first ambassadors to Brunei were non-resident ambassadors, accredited to Brunei in addition to their posts as ambassadors to Malaysia. The first ambassador accredited solely to Brunei was Viktor Seleznyov, appointed on 31 July 2009.

== List of representatives (1968–present) ==
=== Soviet Union to Malaysia (1968-1991) ===
Name	Title	Appointment	Termination	Notes
Vladimir Kuznetsov	Ambassador	9 February 1968	18 December 1973	Credentials presented on 10 April 1968
Vladimir Bendryshev	Ambassador	18 December 1973	24 April 1978	Credentials presented on 28 January 1974
Boris Kulik	Ambassador	24 April 1978	5 September 1984	Credentials presented on 17 May 1978
Fyodor Potapenko	Ambassador	5 September 1984	8 September 1988	Credentials presented on 25 October 1984
Anatoly Khmelnitsky	Ambassador	8 September 1988	22 October 1991 (by the President of the Soviet Union); 2 November 1992 (by the President of Russia)	
Roza Otunbayeva	Ambassador	22 October 1991	25 December 1991	

=== Russian Federation to Malaysia (1991-present) ===
Name	Title	Appointment	Termination	Notes
Roza Otunbayeva	Ambassador	25 December 1991	10 February 1992	
Vitaly Vorobyov	Ambassador	16 March 1993	10 August 1998	
Aleksey Zhukov	Ambassador	10 August 1998	26 June 2000	
Vladimir Morozov	Ambassador	15 September 2000	14 April 2005	
Aleksandr Karchava	Ambassador	14 April 2005	15 June 2010	
Ludmila Vorobyova	Ambassador	15 June 2010	18 February 2015	
Valery Yermolov	Ambassador	18 February 2015	25 October 2019	
Nail Latypov	Ambassador	25 October 2019		Credentials presented on 16 January 2020
