= Kuala Lumpur Sentral station =

Railway station in Malaysia

KA01 KS01 KE1 KT1 KL Sentral; KJ15 KL Sentral – redONE
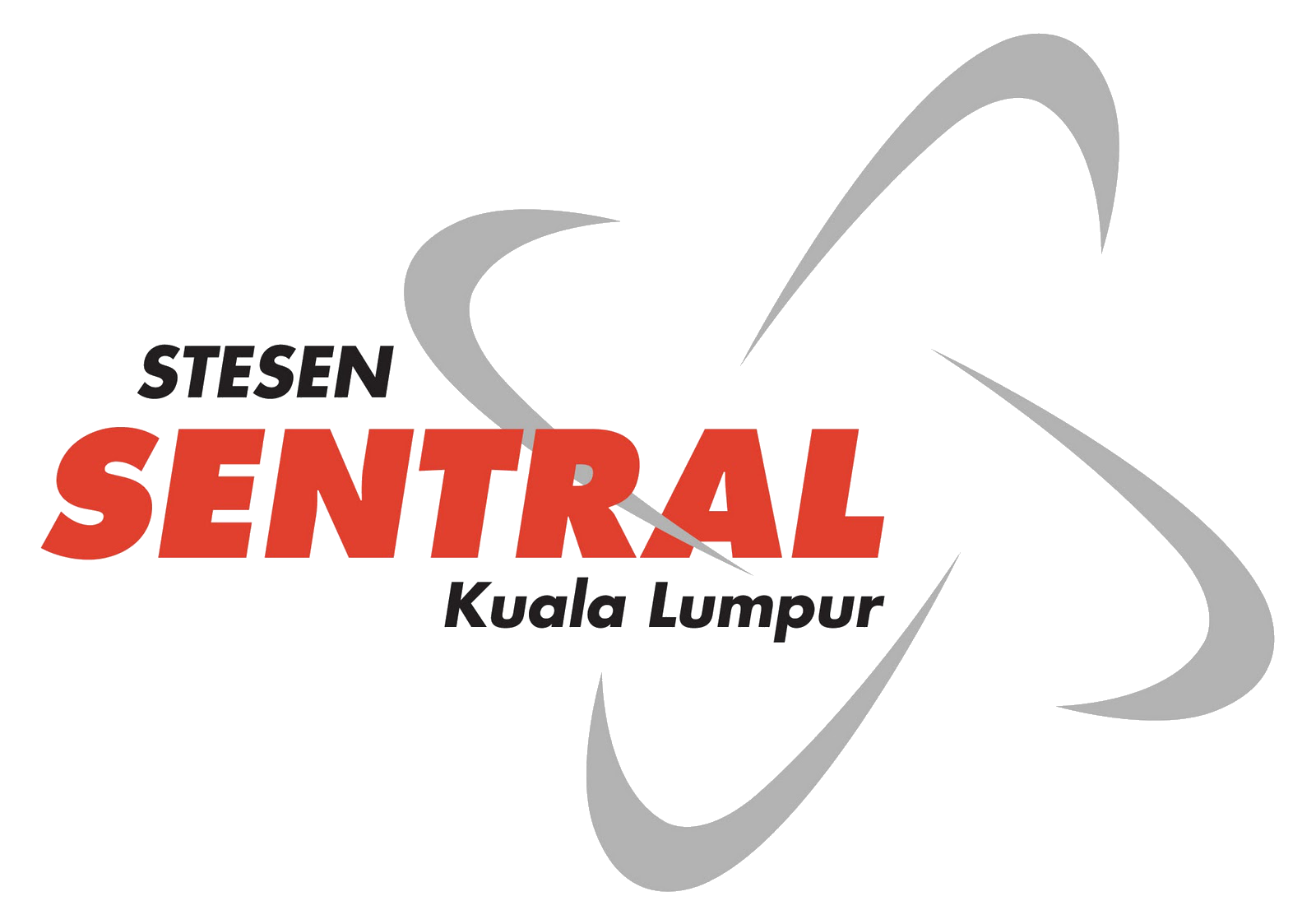
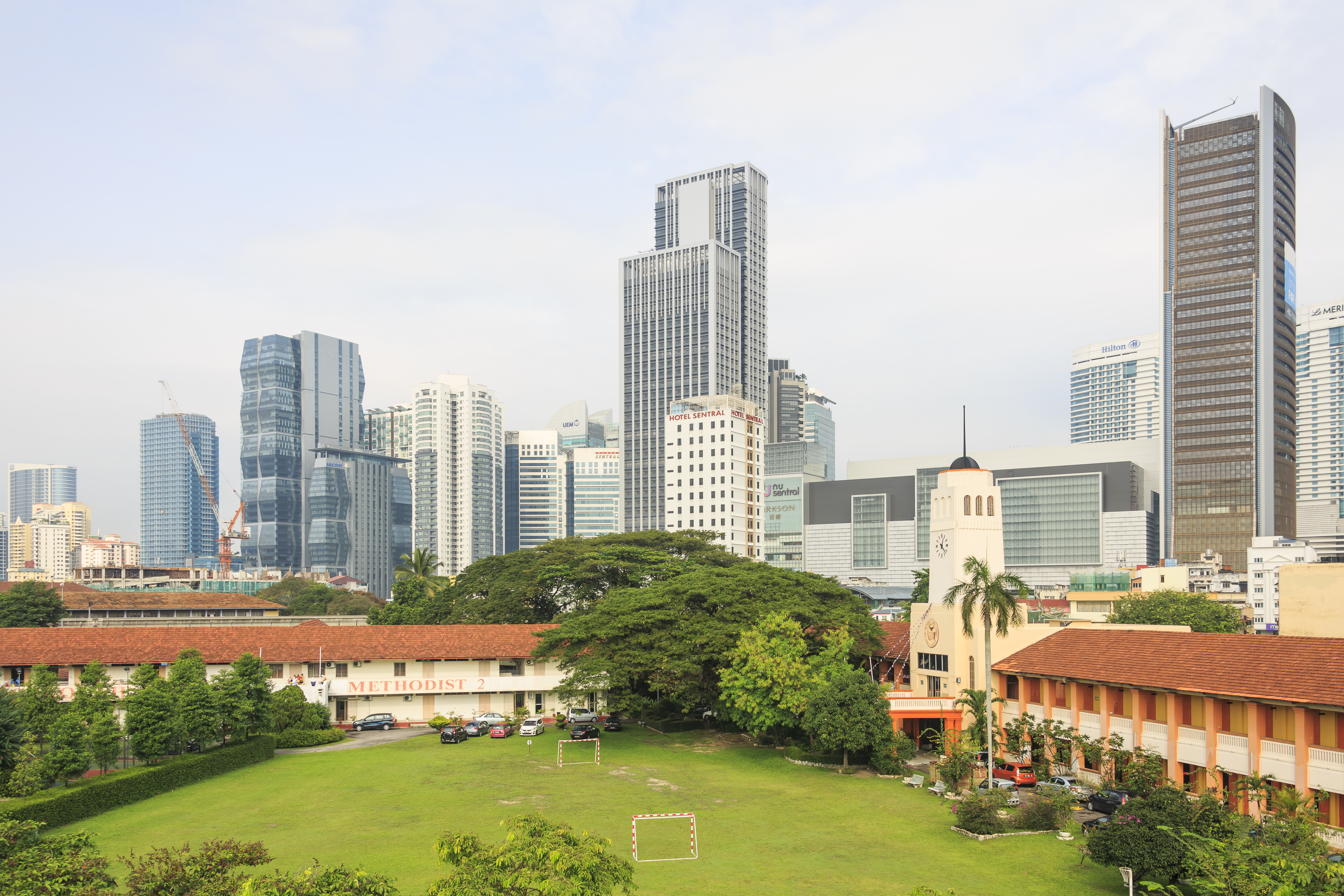
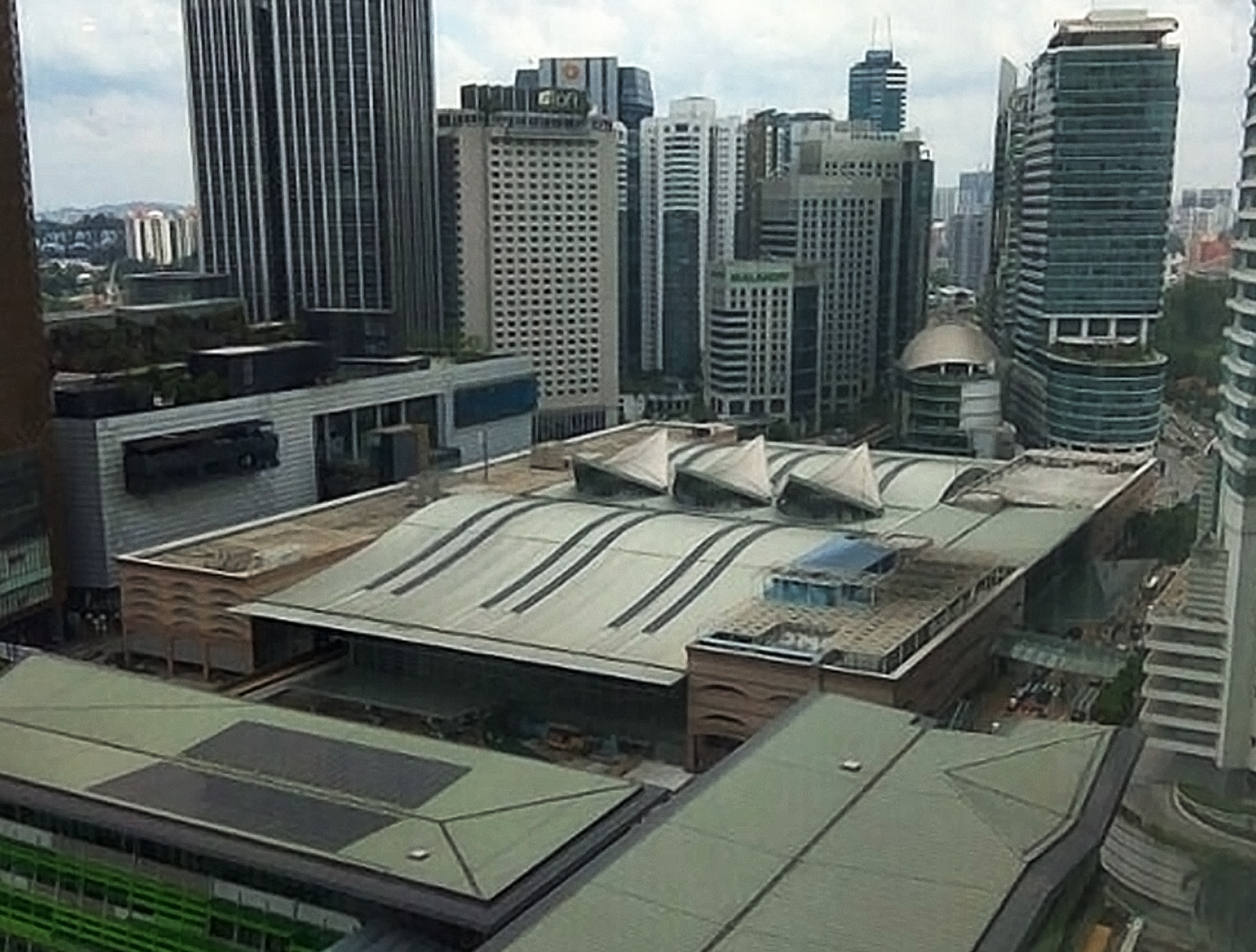
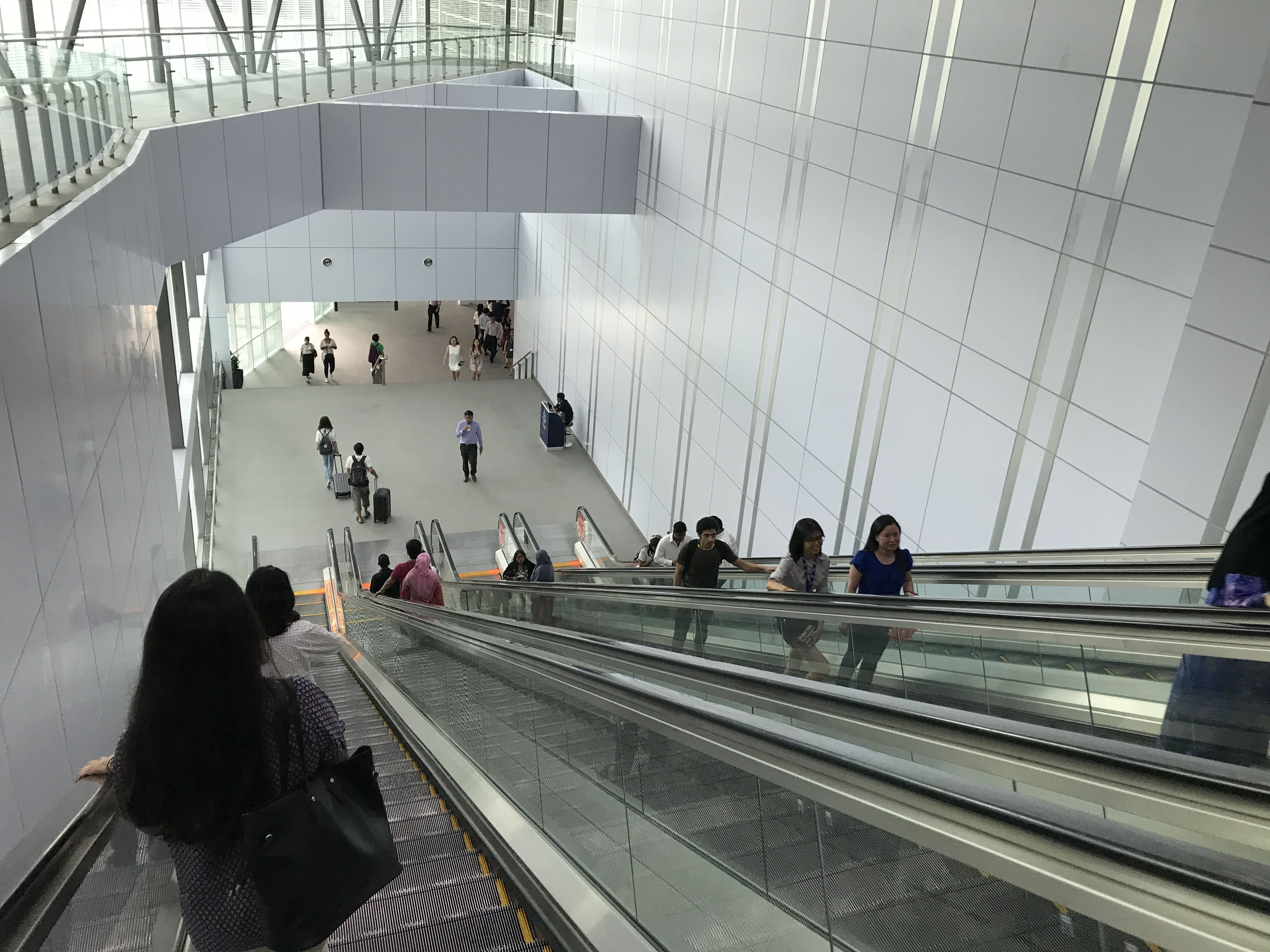
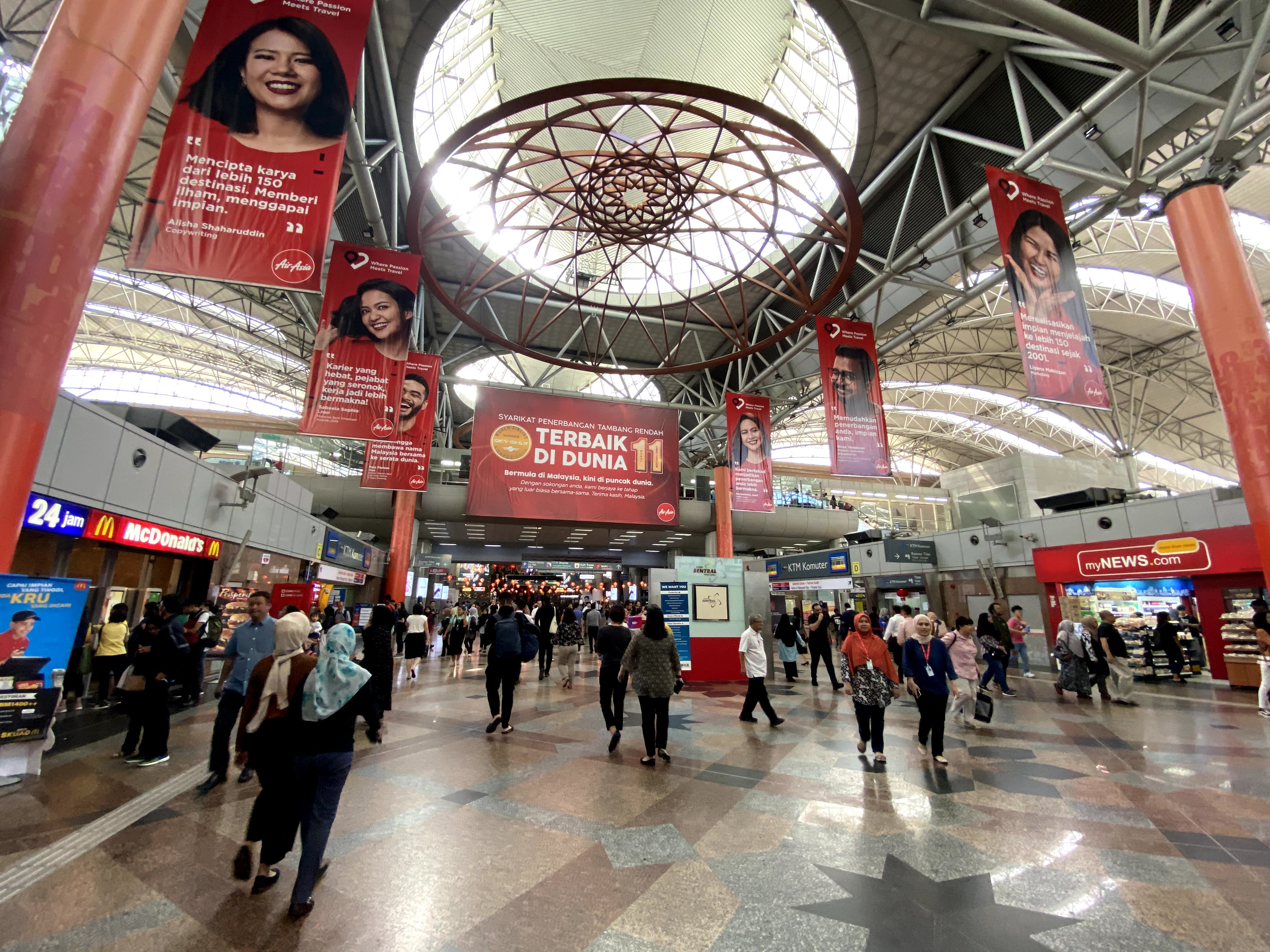
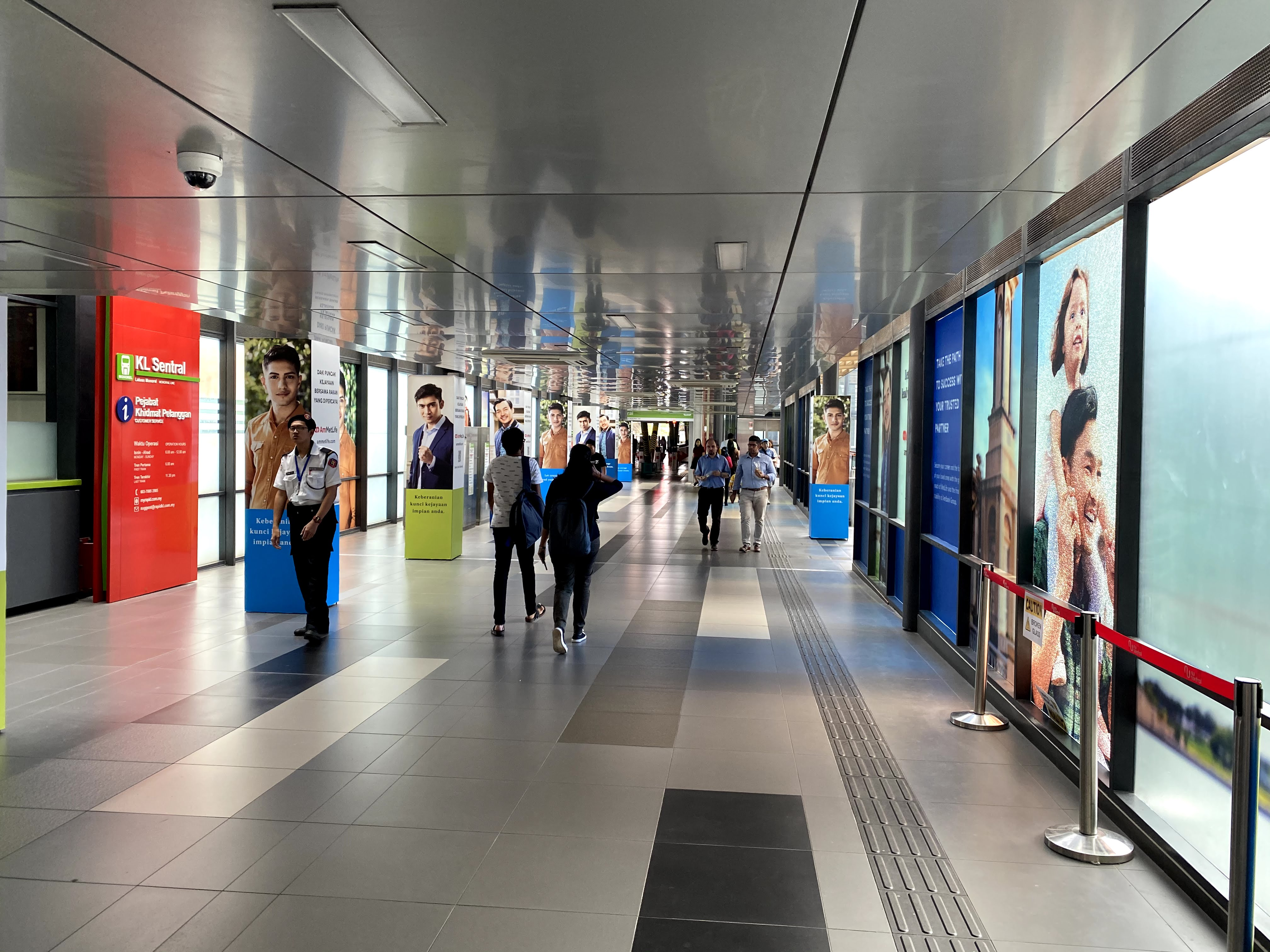
- From top, left to right: KL Sentral CBD, KL Sentral exterior, link to Muzium Negara station, KL Sentral concourse, and link to KL Monorail accessed via Nu Sentral shopping mall

General information
- Other names: Malay: كوالا لمڤور سينترل (Jawi); Chinese: 吉隆坡中环; Tamil: கோலாலம்பூர் சென்ட்ரல்
- Location: Jalan Tun Sambanthan, Brickfields; 50470 Kuala Lumpur; Malaysia
- Coordinates: 3°08′03″N 101°41′11″E
- System: Rapid KL (LRT)
- Owner: MRCB
- Operator: Keretapi Tanah Melayu; Rapid Rail; Express Rail Link
- Lines: West Coast Line; Kelana Jaya Line
- Platforms: 2 island platforms (Batu Caves–Pulau Sebang Line & Tanjung Malim–Port Klang Line); 1 island platform (KTM ETS & KL Sentral–Terminal Skypark Line); 2 side platforms (LRT); 2 side platforms (KLIA Ekspres); 1 island platform (KLIA Transit)
- Tracks: 4 (Batu Caves–Pulau Sebang Line & Tanjung Malim–Port Klang Line); 2 (KTM ETS & KL Sentral–Terminal Skypark Line); 3 (KTM Freight); 2 (LRT); 2 (KLIA Ekspres); 2 (KLIA Transit)
- Connections: Connecting station to MR1 through NU Sentral for KL Monorail; Connecting station to KG15 Muzium Negara for MRT Kajang Line via a 240 meter walkway Feeder buses

Construction
- Structure type: Mostly subsurface; Elevated (LRT)
- Parking: Available with payment
- Accessible: Yes
- Architect: Kisho Kurokawa

Other information
- Station code: KA01 KS01 KJ15 KE1 KT1

History
- Opened: 16 April 2001; 25 years ago (KTM Komuter, KTM Intercity and LRT); 14 April 2002; 24 years ago (ERL); 12 August 2010; 16 years ago (KTM ETS, replacing KTM Intercity); 1 May 2018; 8 years ago (KL Sentral-Terminal Skypark Line)

Services
Preceding station	KTM Komuter	Following station
Kuala Lumpur towards Batu Caves	Batu Caves–Pulau Sebang Line	Mid Valley towards Pulau Sebang/Tampin
Kuala Lumpur towards Tanjung Malim	Tanjung Malim–Port Klang Line	Abdullah Hukum towards Port Klang
Terminus	KL Sentral–Terminal Skypark Line	Subang Jaya towards Terminal Skypark
Preceding station	ETS	Following station
Kuala Lumpur towards Padang Besar	KL Sentral–Padang Besar (Express)	Terminus
Kuala Lumpur towards Butterworth	KL Sentral–Butterworth (Express)	Terminus
Kuala Lumpur towards Ipoh	KL Sentral–Ipoh (Express)	Terminus
Kuala Lumpur towards Padang Besar	KL Sentral–Padang Besar (Platinum)	Terminus
Kuala Lumpur towards Butterworth	KL Sentral–Butterworth (Platinum)	Terminus
Terminus	KL Sentral–JB Sentral (Platinum)	Bandar Tasik Selatan towards JB Sentral
Kuala Lumpur towards Padang Besar	Padang Besar–JB Sentral (Platinum)	Bandar Tasik Selatan towards JB Sentral
Kuala Lumpur towards Butterworth	Butterworth–JB Sentral (Platinum)	Bandar Tasik Selatan towards JB Sentral
Kuala Lumpur towards Padang Besar	Padang Besar–JB Sentral (Gold)	Bandar Tasik Selatan towards JB Sentral
Kuala Lumpur towards Butterworth	Butterworth–Segamat (Gold)	Bandar Tasik Selatan towards Segamat
Kuala Lumpur towards Ipoh	KL Sentral–Ipoh (Gold)	Terminus
Preceding station		Following station
Pasar Seni towards Gombak	Kelana Jaya Line	Bangsar towards Putra Heights
Preceding station	Express Rail Link	Following station
Terminus	KLIA Transit	Bandar Tasik Selatan towards KLIA T2
Terminus	KLIA Ekspres	KLIA T1 towards KLIA T2
Location

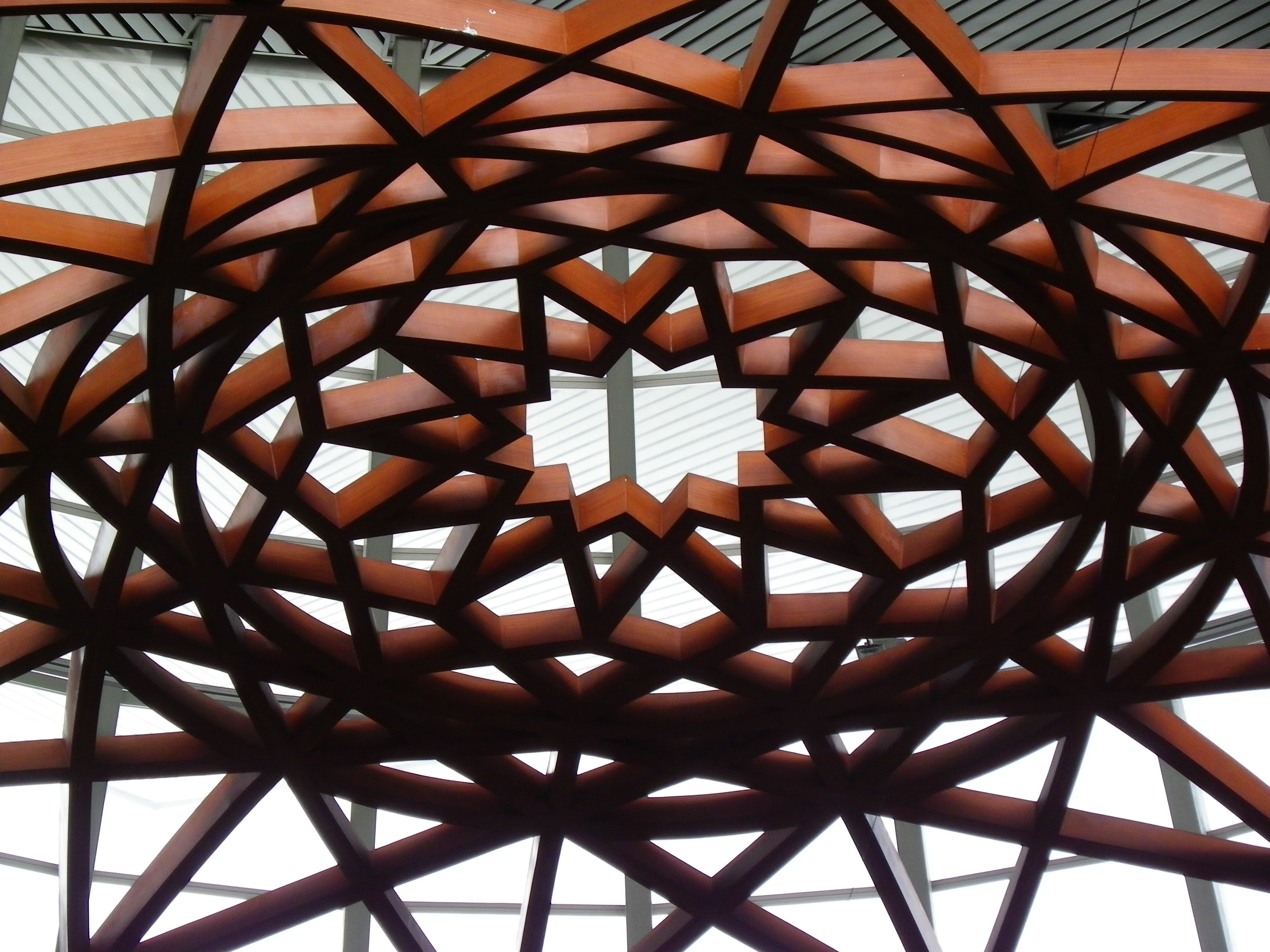
KL Sentral ornate roof decoration

Kuala Lumpur Sentral Station (KL Sentral) is a transit-oriented development that houses the main railway station of Kuala Lumpur, the capital of Malaysia. Opened on 16 April 2001, KL Sentral replaced the old Kuala Lumpur railway station as the city's main inter-city railway station. KL Sentral is the largest railway station in Malaysia, and also in Southeast Asia from 2001 to 2021, before Krung Thep Aphiwat Central Terminal in Bangkok, Thailand was completed.

KL Sentral is designed as an intermodal transport hub. All of the Klang Valley's urban rail lines serve KL Sentral except the Ampang Line, Sri Petaling Line, Shah Alam Line and Putrajaya Line. Passengers can catch intercity trains serving many locations across Peninsular Malaysia to places such as Johor Bahru, Ipoh, and Butterworth, as well as special monthly excursion trains towards Thailand. It was also designed to be a new business and financial hub for Kuala Lumpur.

== Overview ==
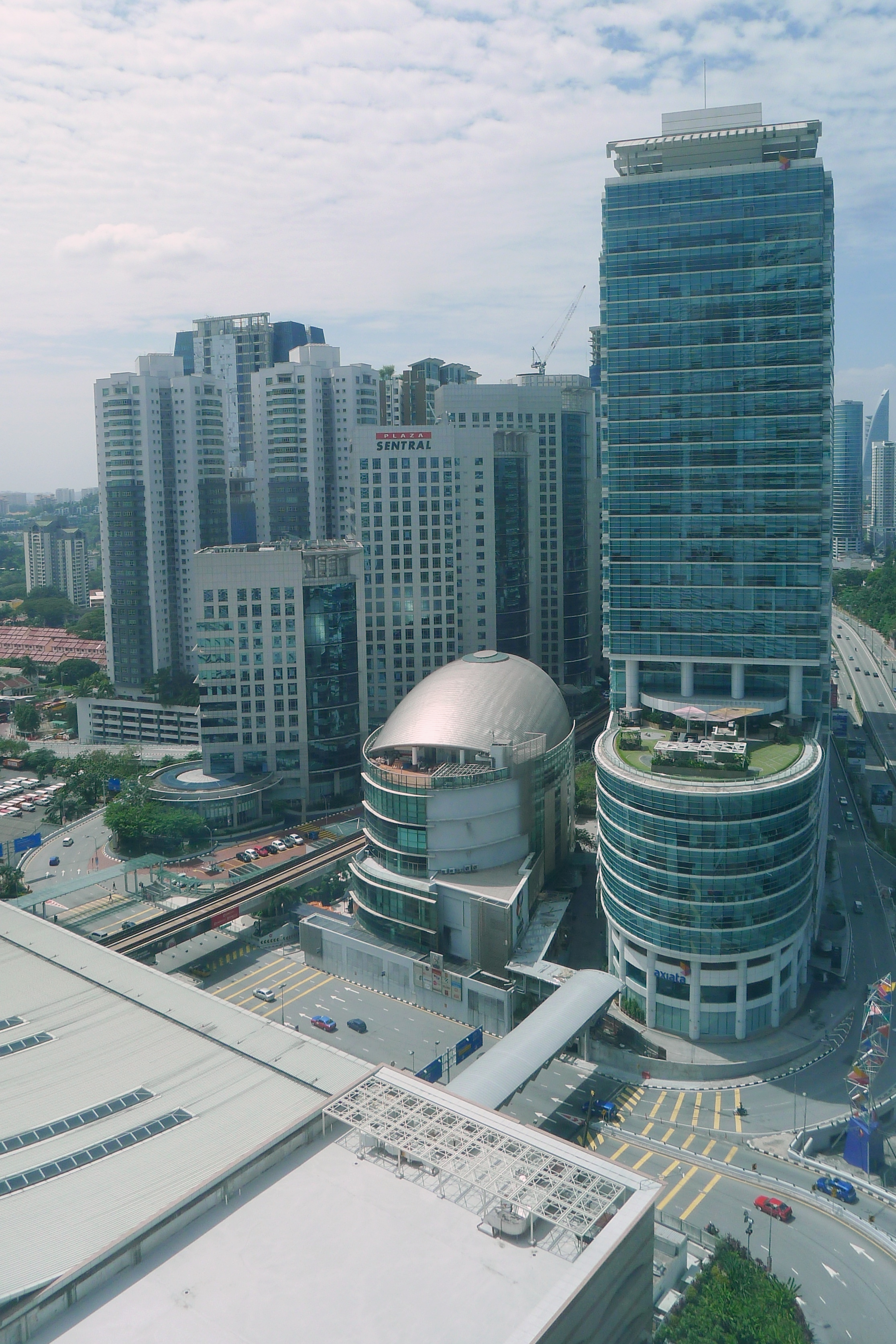
Plaza Sentral and its surroundings located within KL Sentral in early 2013

KL Sentral refers to the entire 290,000 square metres (3,100,000 sq ft) of development built on the former Keretapi Tanah Melayu (KTM) marshalling yard in Brickfields, Kuala Lumpur. The development includes the transport hub, hotels, office towers, condominiums, and shopping malls, and was expected to be completed in 2015. Designed by Japanese architect Kisho Kurokawa, this station initially used Malay, English and Japanese languages signs as a tribute, although the Japanese on the signs were removed in 2025.

KL Sentral has been divided into 14 land parcels, each representing a different function. Some of these lots have been fully constructed and are already in use, while others are either in the process of being built or are still awaiting development, according to the phased programme.

KL Sentral is being developed by a consortium made up of the Malaysian Resources Corporation Berhad (MRCB), Keretapi Tanah Melayu Berhad (KTMB), and Pembinaan Redzai Sdn Bhd.

== History ==
Kuala Lumpur Sentral station stands on the site of the former KTM marshalling yard called the Central Railroad Repair Shops. In the Second World War during the Japanese occupation of Malaya, the yard was the target of the Allies' 1945 bombing of Kuala Lumpur. The yard was targeted twice, on 19 February 1945 and 10 March 1945. The second bombing raid also damaged the nearby National Museum.

In 1994, with the objective of enhancing Kuala Lumpur city's public transport, the Government of Malaysia awarded a contract to a consortium to transform 72 acres (290,000 m^{2}) at the old railway marshalling yard into a modern transit hub within a self-contained urban development. The consortium, led by Malaysian Resources Corp Bhd (MRCB), appointed architect Kisho Kurokawa and Associates, who also designed the Kuala Lumpur International Airport (KLIA), to design the master plan for the entire development.

In July 2010, two trains crashed into each other. One was an airport-bound train, and the other was a parked train. The crash injured three people.

In early August 2019, KL Sentral was one of the locations affected by two online bomb threats posted on Twitter; the other being the Russian Embassy in Kuala Lumpur. These threats were posted via a hacked account by an individual calling himself "limzhengyan"; as a result, the Malaysian police carried out a search on those locations and determined that the threats were hoaxes, although coincidentally on the same day an incomplete improvised explosive device was found at the Bukit Damansara area.

Starting from 29 May 2023, KL Sentral LRT station officially rebranded as KL Sentral-redONE. The partnership is part of a five-year station naming rights agreement between Prasarana Integrated Development and redONE, the largest mobile virtual network operator (MVNO) in ASEAN.

== Development zones ==
The KL Sentral development area is divided into several plots of land, each with a specific development purpose. All constructions were scheduled to be completed by 2015.

Lot	Development Type	Name	Notes
A	Office	CIMB Headquarters (Menara CIMB)	Completed in mid-2012
B	Office	Q Sentral	Announced in July 2010. Originally to be developed by MRCB, Kuwait Finance House and Quill Group, but later MRCB bought all of KFH and Quill shares in the venture. Construction began in Q4 2010 and was completed in 2014.
C	Hotel/Residential	St. Regis Hotel and Residence	Construction started in Q4 2010 and was completed in 2014.
D	Residential	Sentral Residence	MRCB together with Capitaland and the Quill Group of companies will develop a 52-story residential tower. Construction was completed in 2015.
E	Office & Commercial	Platinum Sentral	Constructed and fully developed by MRCB. Construction completed in 2011.
F	Commercial	Unannounced	Announced in 2013, constructions were expected to commence in 2014, but there were no developments at the site. Currently designated as an open-air car park with a sales gallery building.
G	Hotel/Commercial/Office	NU Sentral	A joint venture company between Aseana Investment (Ireka) Limited and MRCB has been set up to develop a hotel and an office tower. MRCB and a Pelaburan Hartanah Bumiputera Bhd subsidiary formed a joint venture develop a retail mall and office tower. Constructions for all buildings began in H2 2008 and are expected to be done by 2012. Also offers integration with KL Monorail. Consists of two office towers, one 27-story and one 37-story, that will be built on top of the mall. A 28-story hotel will also be built on top of the mall.
H	Transportation	Stesen Sentral	Completed in 2000, served by KTM Komuter, KTM ETS, KLIA Transit, KLIA Ekspres and the Kelana Jaya Line. Also acts as a Rapid KL bus hub. The KL Monorail and Kajang Line are within walking distance.
I	Hotel	Hilton Kuala Lumpur & Le Méridien hotels	Completed in 2004
J	Commercial & Office	Sooka Sentral, UEM Headquarters (Mercu UEM), MIDA office, Company Commission of Malaysia Headquarters, Quill 7 and offices of Axiata	Sooka Sentral opened in 2008. Office towers completed in 2009. CVSKL opened its doors in November 2017.
K	Residential	Suasana Sentral	Completed in 2002
L	Residential	Suasana Sentral Loft	Completed in 2008
M	Office	Plaza Sentral	Phase 1 completed in 2001. Phase 2 was completed in 2007.
N	Office	1 Sentral Tower	Completed in 2007. Sold to Tabung Haji

== Office zones ==
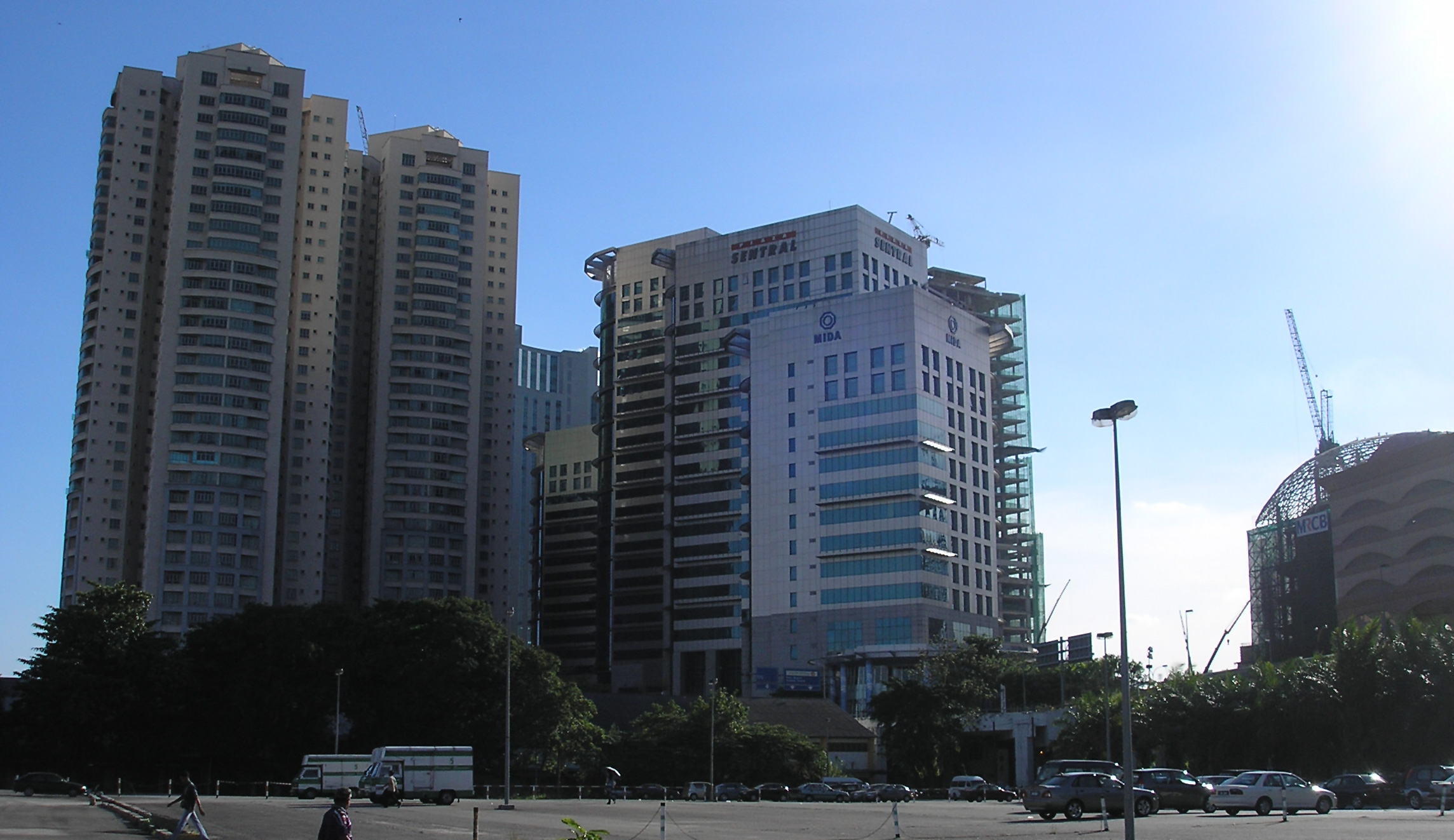
The southern end of Kuala Lumpur Sentral has seen substantial additions of several commercial and civic buildings since 2001.

Office zones in KL Sentral account for more than 50% of the total land area. The developer intends that KL Sentral will ultimately be the business and financial hub of Kuala Lumpur.

=== Lot A: CIMB Headquarters (Menara CIMB) ===
Lot A will be the new headquarters for CIMB Group which is located facing the National Museum. As of June 2011, the new headquarters' name, which appears on the construction site, is Menara CIMB (CIMB Tower). The company acquired the land in July 2008, and construction started in Q4 2007 and was completed in 2011. It has around 600,000 sq ft (56,000 m^{2}) of office space available.

=== Lot M: Plaza Sentral ===
Lot M or Plaza Sentral is a completed office complex in the west of KL Sentral. The complex was completed in two stages.

- Phase I was completed in June 2001, comprising three blocks and a total gross floor area of 785,000 sq ft (72,900 m^{2}). Offering prestigious office suites, Plaza Sentral was sold and quickly taken up by multinationals and Malaysian companies alike, eager to take advantage of the global connectivity and convenience of working in KL Sentral. Its take-up rate is reaching 100%.
- Phase II was launched in September 2003 due to the escalating demand for premium office space. It has since been fully taken up. Comprising two towers – 18-storey and 26-storey – made up of four blocks and a total gross floor area of 879,381 sq ft (81,697.2 m^{2}), the building was completed in 2006. Tenants include British Telecom and Maxis Communications.
- Sentral Tower, a purpose-built 30-storey office tower, was sold to Lembaga Tabung Haji for RM161.46mil in March 2004.
- Plaza Sentral has a basement parking lot.

=== Lot J: Sooka Sentral & 4 Office Towers ===
Lot J is a development lot for four 35-storey office towers of identical architecture.

Lot J was sold to United Engineers (M) Bhd (UEM) in May 2005 with plans for four towers. Tower A was built by UEM for its corporate headquarters called Mercu UEM on the prime piece of land with a gross floor area of 1,300,000 sq ft (120,000 m^{2}). Tower B will be an office tower for the Malaysian Industrial Development Authority. Tower C was built by Quill Realty Sdn Bhd and sold to Suruhanjaya Syarikat Malaysia (SSM) for its corporate headquarters. Tower D is an office building built by Quill, named Quill 7.

A development on Lot J is the 180,000 sq ft (17,000 m^{2}) six-storey lifestyle centre which houses a fitness and spa centre, business centre, food court, restaurants, and alfresco dining facilities. This development, called Sooka Sentral, opened its doors in December 2007.

=== Lot N: 1 Sentral Tower ===
1 Sentral Tower is an office tower, offering a gross floor area of 453,000 sq ft (42,100 m^{2}). Construction was completed in 2007. It houses companies such as PricewaterhouseCoopers, MRCB, and General Electric.

=== Others ===
Lot B has been proposed as a financial area for KL Sentral. No construction has taken place.

Lot F is planned for a future office block. Currently, the base is used for a furniture exhibition mall and a Food and Beverage (F&B) centre.

== Entertainment zones ==
Lot E will be a hub for an entertainment and convention centre. The deck of this development has been completed.

=== Lot G: NU Sentral ===
Lot G, located in the south of KL Sentral consist of 1,200,000 sq ft (110,000 m^{2}) shopping complex, 600,000 sq ft (56,000 m^{2}) office block, 500,000 sq ft (46,000 m^{2}) serviced apartments, and a 546,000 sq ft (50,700 m^{2}) three-star hotel. NU Sentral is the shopping mall in the area, and directly acts as a pathway between Stesen Sentral and the KL Sentral monorail station. Development works commenced in 2008 and were completed in 2014. The land was previously used as a parking lot and a short-cut for pedestrians from Brickfields and the KL Sentral Monorail station to KL Sentral proper.

In January 2008, MRCB set up a joint venture company with Pelaburan Hartanah Bumiputera Bhd (PHBB) named Jewel Surprises Sdn Bhd to develop the area. The new company will hold a lease on the plot of land for 99 years.

== Transport hub ==
=== Lot H: Stesen Sentral ===
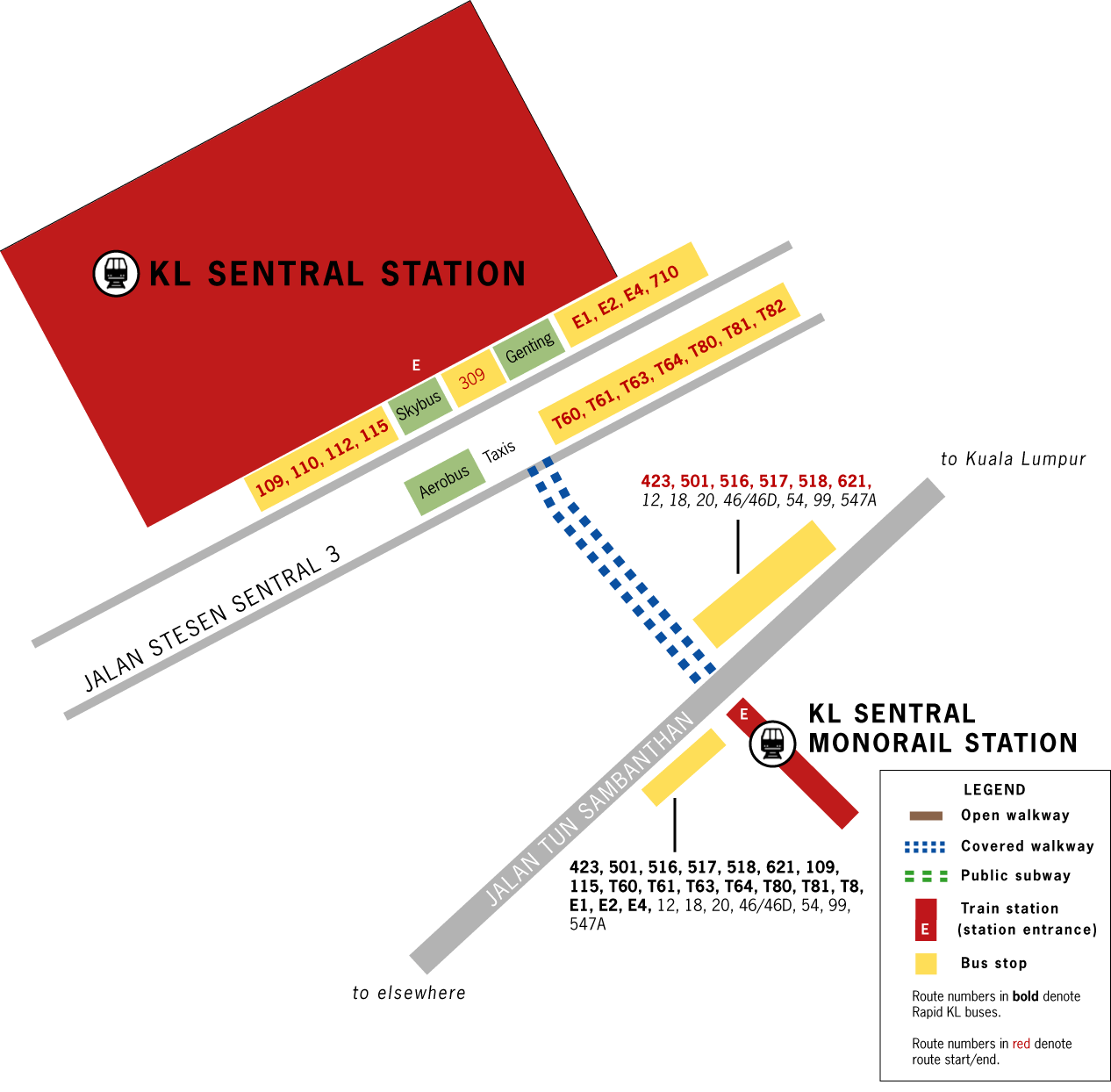
KL Sentral and surroundings map

Stesen Sentral (English: Central Station) is the name of Lot H, which is the designated transport hub within the KL Sentral development project, although both the public and connected transit lines generally refer to the station itself as "KL Sentral".

Stesen Sentral, designed to house six rail networks, was completed in December 2000, and the rail, retail, and food and beverage operations began in April 2001. Standing on 9.3 acres (38,000 m^{2}), the main building has a gross floor area of 500,000 square feet (46,000 m^{2}), and the specifications were based on passenger projections up to the year 2020, which was when Malaysia aspired to be a fully developed nation.

In 2008, Stesen Sentral registered over 100,000 passengers daily, which translates into 36.5 million people a year.

The station has a parking lot for visitors and people working around the KL Sentral area.

==== Rail services ====
Interior of KL Sentral station

West wing of KL Sentral - redONE LRT station entrance

KL Sentral is served by the following services:

- Express Rail Link (ERL): airport rail link to Kuala Lumpur International Airport (KLIA)
  - 6 KLIA Ekspres: non-stop express trains to KLIA T1 and KLIA T2 stations.
  - 7 KLIA Transit: commuter-style trains to KLIA that also calls at all stations in between, i.e., Bandar Tasik Selatan, Putrajaya & Cyberjaya, and Salak Tinggi.
- KTM Komuter: Commuter trains serving the Klang Valley region
  - 1 Batu Caves–Pulau Sebang Line: Batu Caves – Pulau Sebang/Tampin
  - 2 Tanjung Malim–Port Klang Line: Tanjung Malim – Port Klang
  - ~~10 KL Sentral–Terminal Skypark Line: limited express trains to Subang Jaya and Terminal Skypark~~ (Suspended)
- ETS KTM ETS: Intercity trains to Segamat, JB Sentral, Ipoh, Butterworth, and Padang Besar
- KTM Intercity: Seasonal trains to Hat Yai Junction (MySawadee), Butterworth and Tumpat (Rail To See Malaysia excursion trains). Other special expresses like Lambaian Aidilfitri will also start here.
- Rapid KL: Light rapid transit (LRT)
  - 5 Kelana Jaya Line: Putra Heights – Gombak

(Note: the Kelana Jaya Line station is branded as KL Sentral-redONE under the station naming rights programme.)

===== KL City Air Terminal (KL CAT) =====
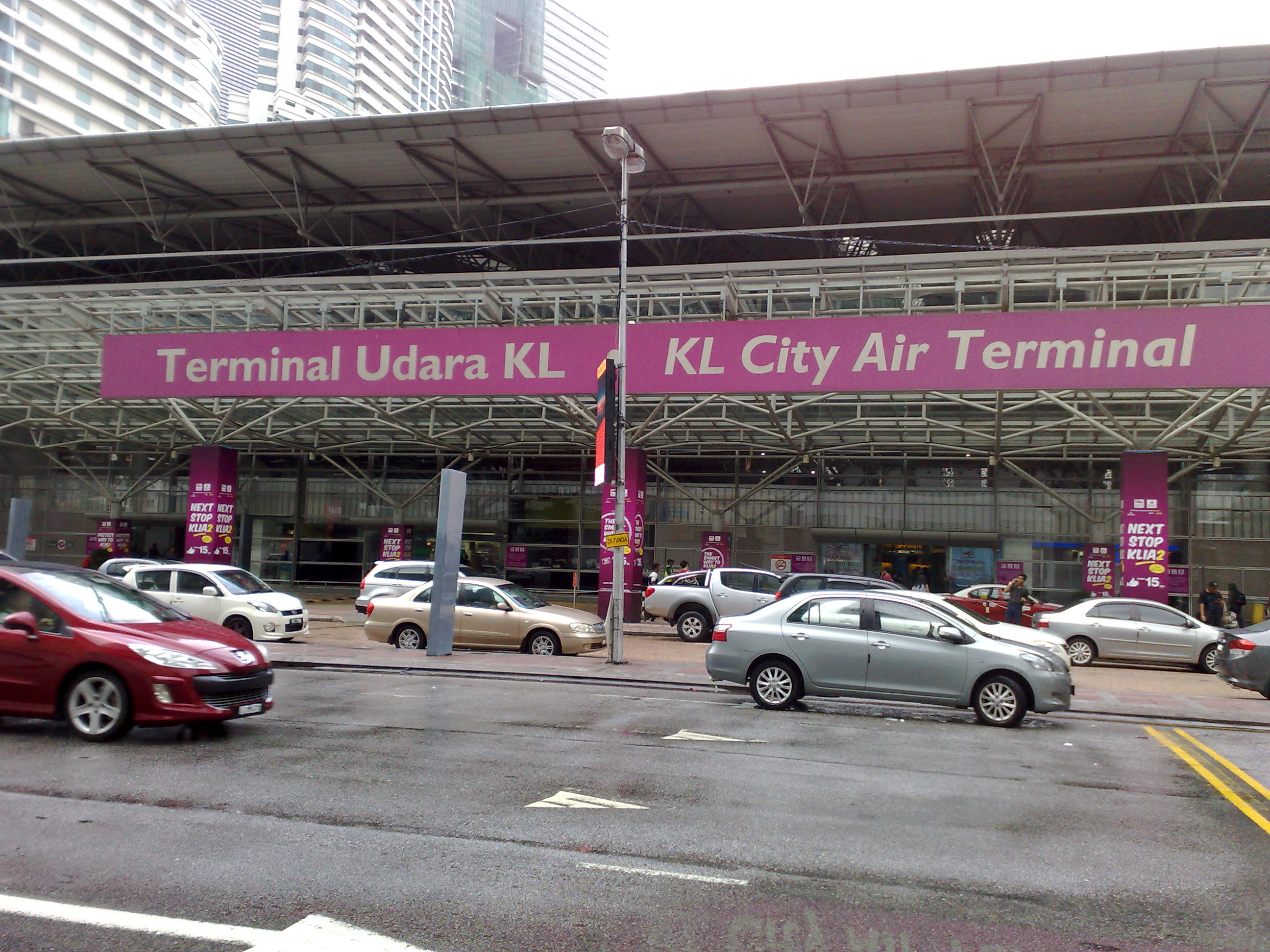
KL City Air Terminal

KL City Air Terminal is located at the eastern and western ends of the station building and was opened on 14 April 2002 together with the KLIA Ekspres. Designed as an "Airport Terminal in the City", KL CAT is an IATA-indexed station and is assigned the IATA code XKL.

As of October 2023, passengers flying Malaysia Airlines and Batik Air can check in their baggage at KL CAT before boarding a KLIA Ekspres train to Kuala Lumpur International Airport.

KL CAT is divided into two halls:

- KL CAT Departure Hall is located at the western end of the station building and houses the check-in counters, ticketing counters, and faregates to access KLIA Ekspres departure platform.
- KL CAT Arrival Hall is located at the eastern end of the station building and houses the exit faregates from KLIA Ekspres arrival platform. The linkway that connects to Muzium Negara for the MRT Kajang Line is also located at this hall.

When KL CAT was built, there were plans to offer through checked baggage service from KLIA to KL CAT where checked baggage of passengers arriving at KLIA would be conveyed to KL CAT and collected by passengers at KL CAT. However, these plans have not materialised.

==== Connecting rail services ====
The following lines have stations located within the vicinity of the KL Sentral complex:

- KL Monorail: KL Sentral Monorail station at Jalan Tun Sambanthan can be accessed via NU Sentral shopping mall located adjacent to the KL Sentral complex.
- Kajang Line: Muzium Negara station at Jalan Damansara can be accessed via a 200-metre (660 ft) underground walkway from the KL Sentral complex.

=== Connecting stations ===
==== KL Sentral Monorail station ====
MR1 KL Sentral
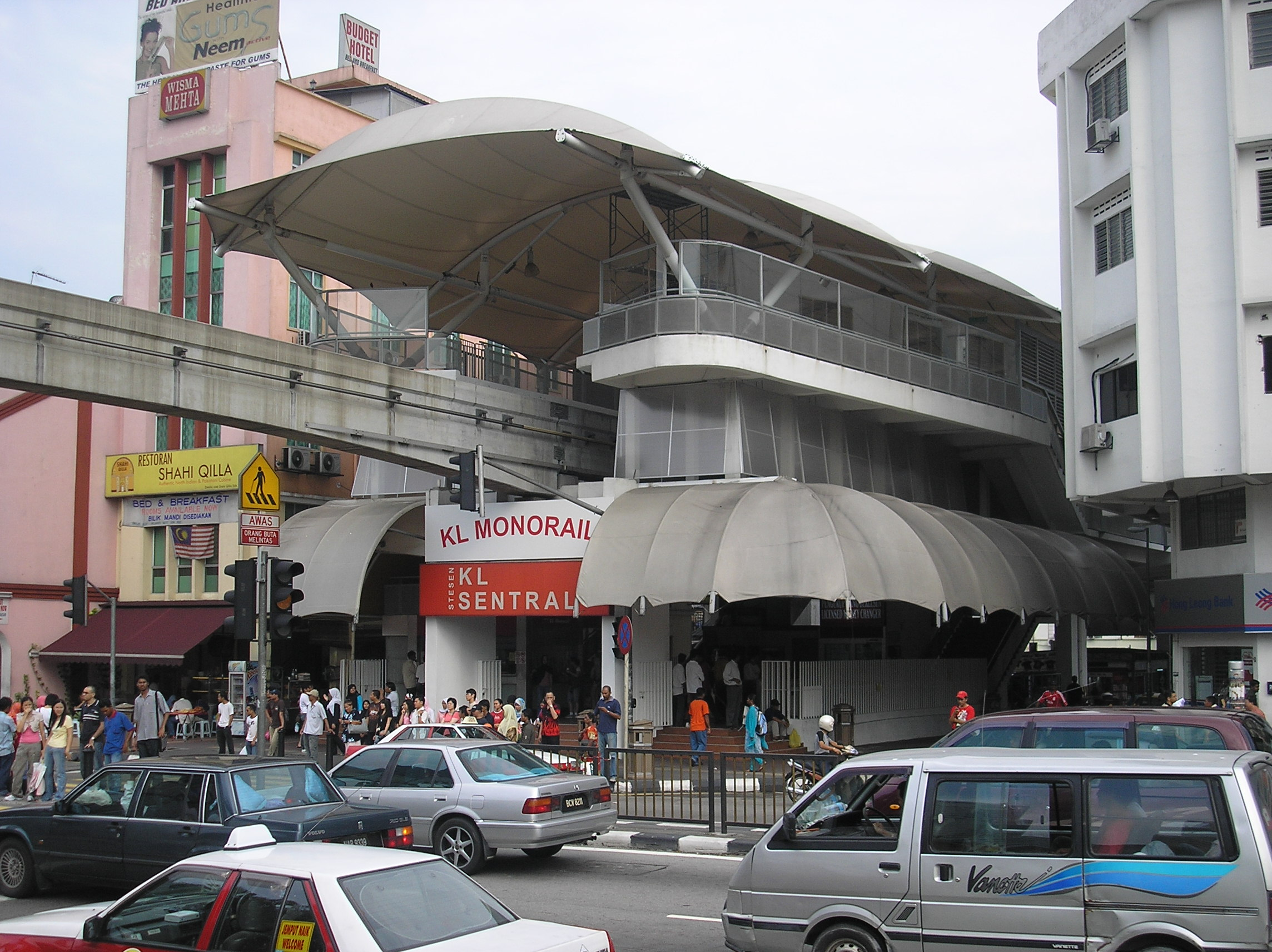
- The view of the KL Sentral Monorail station before upgrades. It was built outside and across the street from the KL Sentral transport hub, opposite the future site of NU Sentral.

General information
- Other names: Malay: كوالا لمڤور سينترل (Jawi); Chinese: 吉隆坡中环; Tamil: கோலாலம்பூர் சென்ட்ரல்
- Location: Jalan Tun Sambanthan, Brickfields; 50470 Kuala Lumpur; Malaysia
- System: Rapid KL
- Owner: Prasarana Malaysia
- Operator: Rapid Rail
- Line: 8 KL Monorail
- Platforms: 2 side platforms (Spanish solution)
- Tracks: 1

Construction
- Structure type: Elevated
- Parking: None

Other information
- Station code: MR1

History
- Opened: 31 August 2003; 23 years ago

Services
Preceding station		Following station
Terminus	KL Monorail	Tun Sambanthan towards Titiwangsa
Location

The KL Sentral monorail station stands on Jalan Tun Sambanthan in Brickfields, in front of the NU Sentral shopping mall. The station is the as a terminus for the KL Monorail line. It is directly connected to NU Sentral, which allows for uninterrupted walking between Stesen Sentral and the monorail station.

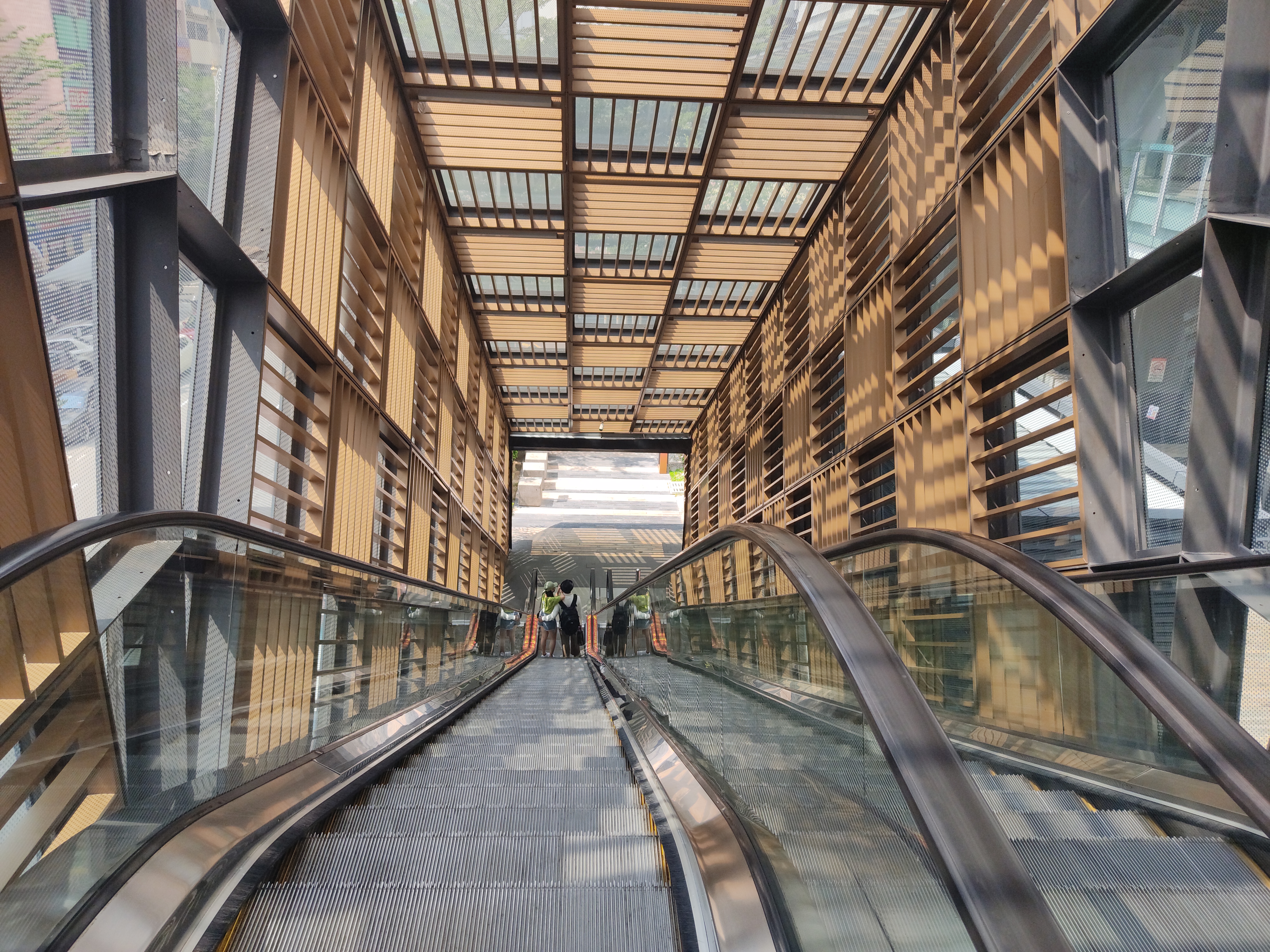
The escalators from Jalan Tun Sambanthan to the station are a popular photo spot amongst tourists, owing to their wooden style architecture.

The monorail station is also equipped with new ticket vending machines, ticketing gates as well as a new Customer Service Office. Tactile paving for the visually impaired is also provided beginning from NU Sentral. The completion of the overhead bridge now enables customers to travel between KL Sentral and the monorail station safely and conveniently. The station uses the Spanish solution platforms, having one track with a platform on each side, for passengers embarking and disembarking the train separately.

Before NU Sentral was built, passengers who wanted to move from the monorail station to Stesen Sentral and vice versa had to walk through the busy Jalan Tun Sambanthan.

The monorail and LRT stations do not provide an out-of-station interchange despite being part of the same Rapid KL system. Passengers will be charged two single-way journey fares instead of integrated fares whenever using these connecting stations.

==== Muzium Negara MRT station ====
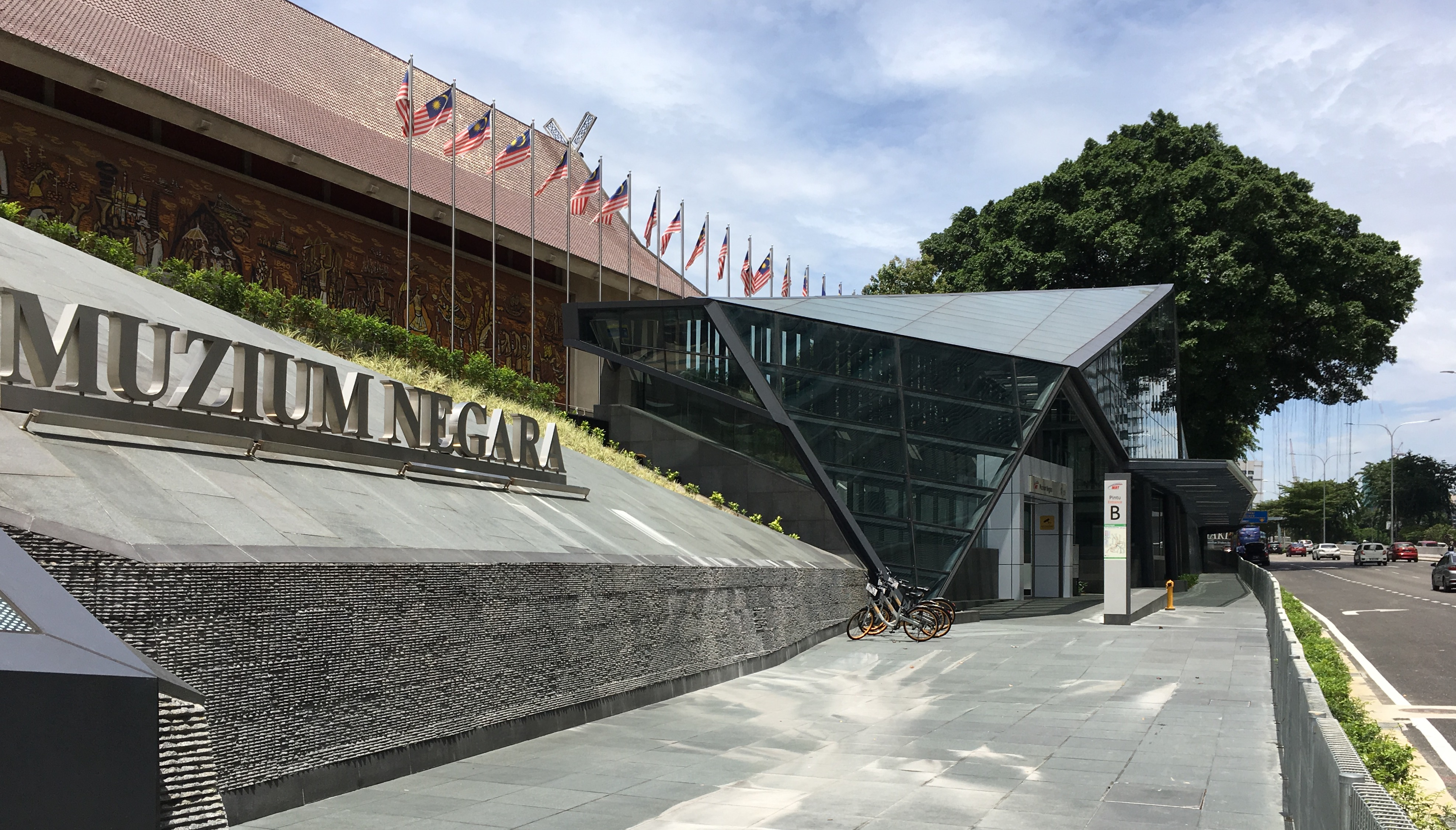

Due to space constraints, an MRT station could not be built in the Stesen Sentral area, an MRT station had to be built in front of the nearby National Museum to allow connections to Stesen Sentral. The Muzium Negara station opened on 17 July 2017, along with the underground footbridge that connects the MRT station to the main KL Sentral building.

=== KL Sentral bus hub ===
KL Sentral has also been made a city bus hub by Rapid KL as part of its bus network revamp. It is the bus hub for city shuttle and trunk bus routes.

Buses to Singapore and the Kuala Lumpur International Airport also operate from KL Sentral, while most other bus operators go near KL Sentral along Jalan Tun Sambanthan. Also, a hop-on/hop-off tourist bus stop is located between the Hilton and the station. Traveling by bus to Genting Highlands is also available here.

==== Bus services ====
===== From KL Sentral =====
- 800: Bandar Utama bus hub – KL Sentral
- T819: Pusat Bandar Damansara MRT station – KL Sentral
- T851: Parliament of Malaysia – KL Sentral (Only available during meeting session)

===== From Pasar Seni / Kotaraya / Lebuh Pudu =====
- 500: Putrajaya Sentral – Lebuh Pudu bus hub (Lebuh Pudu-bound only)
- 600: Puchong Utama – Pasar Seni
- 601: Putra Perdana – Pasar Seni
- 602: Puchong Prima – Pasar Seni
- 604: Saujana Puchong – Pasar Seni
- 640: Taman Sri Sentosa / Sri Manja – Pasar Seni
- 641: Subang Jaya station – Pasar Seni
- 650: Taman Desa – Pasar Seni
- 651: Taman OUG – Pasar Seni via Awan Besar LRT station
- 652: Awan Besar LRT station – Pasar Seni
- 671: Flat Enggang Kinrara – Pasar Seni
- 710: Port Klang – Pasar Seni via KL Sentral
- 750: UiTM Section 2, Shah Alam – Pasar Seni
- 751: Taman Sri Muda, Shah Alam – Pasar Seni
- 770: Subang Mewah, USJ 1 – Pasar Seni
- 772: Subang Suria – Pasar Seni
- 780: Kota Damansara – Pasar Seni
- 781: Taman Medan / Taman Sri Manja – Pasar Seni
- 782: Petaling Jaya Old Town – Pasar Seni
- 821: Pantai Hillpark – Pasar Seni
- 822: Bangsar Park – Pasar Seni
- 851: Pasar Seni – Kompleks Mahkamah, Jalan Duta
- BET3: Subang Mewah, USJ 1 – Pasar Seni via New Pantai Expressway (NPE)
- BET4: Taman Sri Muda, Shah Alam – Pasar Seni via New Pantai Expressway (NPE)

== Hotels and residential zones ==
=== Lot C: St. Regis Hotel ===
Lot C houses the St. Regis Hotel Kuala Lumpur. The luxurious hotel consists of 208 rooms and suites, which started its operation in May 2016.

=== Lot D: The Sentral Residences ===
Lot D consists of two 55-storey residential towers called The Sentral Residences that overlook the Lake Gardens and the city. Jointly developed by MRCB, CapitaLand and Quill Group, construction was completed in 2015.

=== Lot I : Hilton KL & Le Méridien Hotels ===
Lot I consists of two skyscraper hotels occupied by Hilton Kuala Lumpur and Le Méridien Kuala Lumpur, owned by Daito Asia Development Sdn. Bhd. and Daisho Asia Development Sdn. Bhd. respectively. The hotels opened for business in September and October 2004 respectively.

=== Lot K and L: Suasana Sentral and Suasana Sentral Loft ===
Lot K is the location of a serviced apartment, Suasana Sentral. Suasana Sentral consists of two blocks, or 400 units of apartments. It was completed in 2002 and is fully sold and occupied, with about 40% of the buyers coming from the international community.

The second phase of condominiums on Lot L, Suasana Sentral Loft was launched in early 2005 and began occupancy in early 2008. The 37 and 38-storey apartment towers have a total of 600 units. All have been sold.

== See also ==
- Kuala Lumpur railway station
- KLIA Transit
- Keretapi Tanah Melayu
- Kelana Jaya line
- Public transport in Kuala Lumpur
- Transportation in Kuala Lumpur
