= Terminal Skypark Komuter station =

Railway station in Selangor, Malaysia

Coordinates: 3.13429°N 101.55544°E

Terminal Skypark

- KTM Terminal Skypark station view from Subang Skypark

General information
- Other names: Malay: ترمينل سکايڤرک (Jawi); Chinese: 天空花园航站楼; Tamil: தெர்மினல் ஸ்கைபார்க்
- Location: Sultan Abdul Aziz Shah Airport Terminal 3, Subang, Selangor; Malaysia
- System: KS03 | Commuter rail station
- Owner: Keretapi Tanah Melayu
- Line: Port Klang Branch
- Platforms: 2 side platforms
- Tracks: 2

Other information
- Station code: KS03

History
- Opened: 1 May 2018; 8 years ago

Services
Preceding station	KTM Komuter	Following station
Subang Jaya towards Kuala Lumpur Sentral	KL Sentral–Terminal Skypark Line	Terminus
Location

Terminal Skypark Komuter station is a KTM Komuter limited express station located in Subang, Selangor, Malaysia. It opened on 1 May 2018.

The station serves the Subang Skypark Terminal (Terminal 3) of the Sultan Abdul Aziz Shah Airport, providing the airport with a rail connection to Kuala Lumpur and the rest of Klang Valley.

The station is the terminus of the KL Sentral–Terminal Skypark Line, which shares tracks with the Port Klang Line between KL Sentral station and Subang Jaya station before branching off towards the airport.

== Location ==
The station is located immediately across the Subang Airport Highway from Subang Skypark. An open-air car park sits directly in front of the station. Passengers going from the airport building to the station are required to cross a pedestrian bridge and walk through a portion of the car park.

== Layout ==
In contrast to most KTM Komuter stations which are at ground level, Terminal Skypark station is elevated; the ticketing counter and control facilities are on ground level but the train platforms are one floor above ground. This and the Sungai Gadut station are the only elevated stations in the Komuter system.

Toilets and a surau are available on the ground floor.

The station has two side platforms along two railway tracks. Platform 1 is for trains terminating at the station, while Platform 2 is for trains heading towards Subang Jaya and KL Sentral.

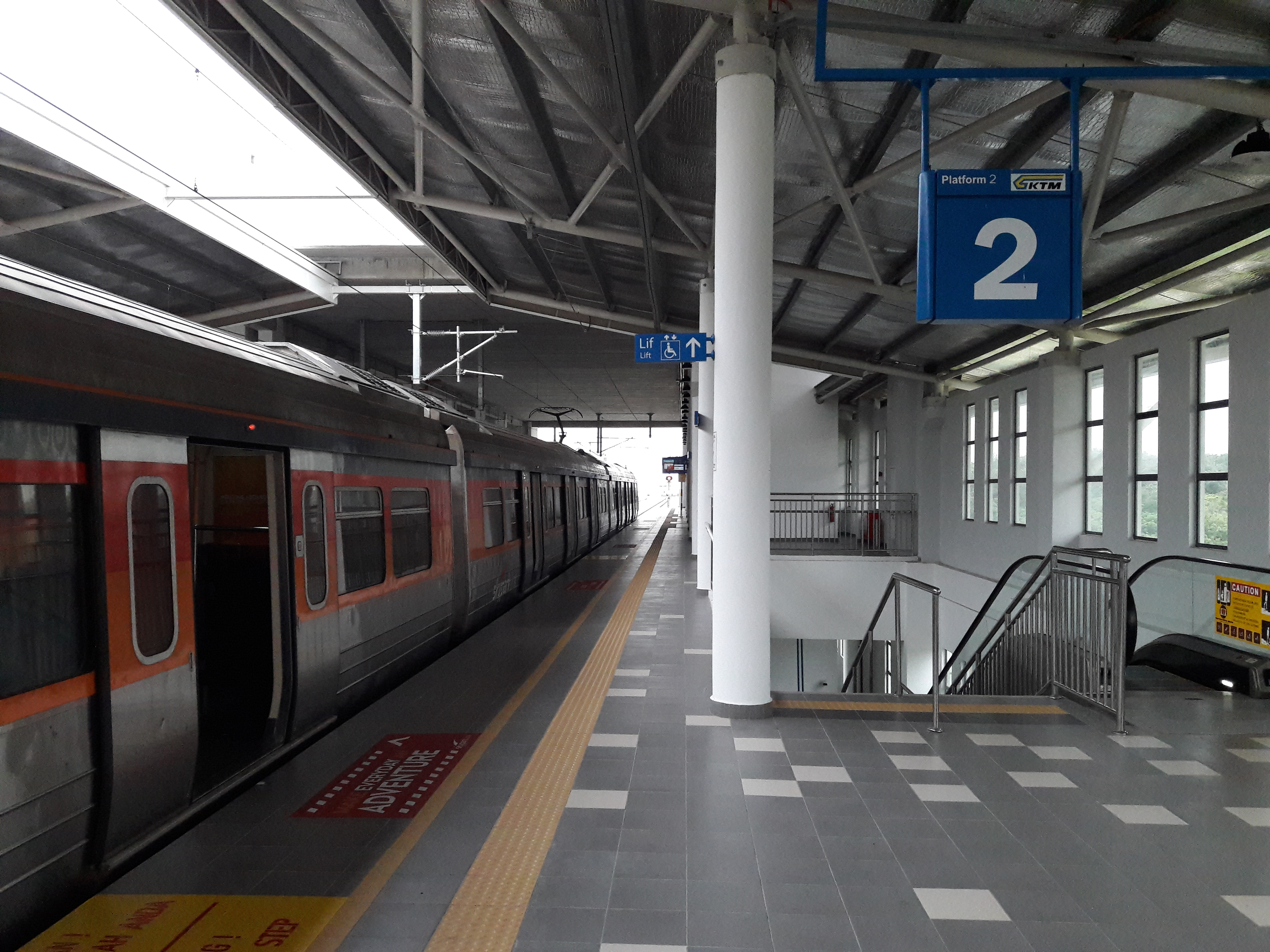
Platform 2, KL Sentral-bound

== Feeder buses ==
Connecting bus routes are clearly displayed at the station.

Bus connections are available in front of the station entrance.

Route No.	Origin	Destination	Via	Connecting to
772	KS03 Terminal Skypark (Subang Skypark)	KJ14 KG16 Pasar Seni	Jalan Lapangan Terbang Subang; KJ26 Ara Damansara; KD08 SB1 Setia Jaya; Lebuhraya Persekutuan; KJ21 Asia Jaya; KJ19 KL Gateway-Universiti; Jalan Pantai Baharu; KD01 KJ17 Abdullah Hukum; Jalan Bangsar; KJ16 Bank Rakyat-Bangsar	T804
T804	KS03 Terminal Skypark (Subang Skypark)	KG05 Kwasa Sentral	Jalan Lapangan Terbang Subang; Jalan Sungai Buloh	772
