= Kota Puteri =

Suburb in Gombak, Selangor, Malaysia

Coordinates: 3°18′22.8″N 101°25′59.3″E

Kota Puteri is a township in Gombak District, Selangor, Malaysia, developed by the PKNS. The town is alternately known as Bandar Baru Batu Arang. It is divided into 12 sections.

== Location ==
Located in the northwest of the Klang Valley, Kota Puteri is situated to the west of Rawang and roughly halfway between Rawang and Kuala Selangor. It lies within the Gombak District and is located near the northwestern end of the district, close to the border with the Kuala Selangor District. It is also situated close to the Selayang–Kuala Selangor constituency border.

== Access ==
=== Car ===
Kota Puteri is served primarily by Jalan Batu Arang B111 which interchanges into Kepong–Kuala Selangor Highway Federal Route 54 on its western end. The township is also served by the LATAR Expressway on the southern boundary.

=== Public transportation ===
==== Bus ====
Selangor Omnibus 100 to MRT/KTM Sungai Buloh and Kuala Selangor. By Federal Route 54 Jalan Kuala Selangor.

Smart Selangor Bus MPS3 from Batu Arang to MRT/KTM Sungai Buloh via Bandar Tasik Puteri and Kundang.

MRT Feeder Bus T155 to MRT/KTM Sungai Buloh via Bandar Seri Coalfields. MRT Putrajaya line feeder bus trial route start from 29 December 2023 until 28 March 2024. The line still active now until 30 March 2025.

==== Rail ====
Upcoming Kita Selangor Rail line from Kuang Komuter Station to Kuala Selangor line.

== Administration ==
Kota Puteri falls under the jurisdiction of the Selayang Municipal Council and Mukim Rawang. It also falls under the parliamentary constituency of Selayang, and is represented in Parliament by William Leong Jee Keen from Pakatan Harapan-Parti Keadilan Rakyat.

In the Selangor State Legislative Assembly, Kota Puteri is represented by Chua Wei Kiat of the Pakatan Harapan-Parti Keadilan Rakyat under the Rawang constituency.

== Development ==
=== Section 1 ===
Tasik Kota Puteri (Recreation and flood retention pond)

=== Section 2 ===
Residential and commercial

=== Section 3 ===
Mosque, city centre and commercial centre

=== Section 4 ===
Public service facilities Hospital, Police Station and Petrol/EV Station

=== Section 5 ===
Residential, (idaman PKNS, Rumah Selangorku) and low scale commercial

=== Section 6 ===
Industrial (Nouvelle Industrial Park or Kota Puteri Industrial Park Phase 1) and fire station

=== Section 7 ===
Public service facilities School Complex and transit oriented development (T.O.D.) for upcoming Kota Puteri West rail station.

=== Section 8 ===
Residential, recreation and primary & secondary school

=== Section 9 ===
Residential (Rumah Selangorku) and industrial

=== Section 10 ===
Industrial (Kota Puteri Industrial Park Phase 2)

=== Section 11 ===
Industrial (GRIP Kota Puteri Green Industrial Park) and Muslim cemetery

=== Section 12 ===
Bungalow lot, agricultural, industrial and transit oriented development (T.O.D.) for upcoming Kota Puteri East rail station.
