= Bandar Seri Coalfields =

Township in Sungai Buloh, Selangor, Malaysia

- Township

Other transcription(s)
  - Malay: Bandar Seri Coalfields
  - Chinese: 斯里煤炭田镇 (Simplified) 斯里煤炭田鎮 (Traditional)
- Interactive map of Bandar Seri Coalfields
- Coordinates: 3.244043°N 101.480888°E
- Country: Malaysia
- State: Selangor
- District: Kuala Selangor

Government
  - Local authority: Kuala Selangor Municipal Council

Area
  - Total: 405 ha (1,001 acres)

Population (2025)
  - Total: 10,300
  - Density: 2,540/km^{2} (6,590/sq mi)
- Estimate
- Time zone: UTC+08:00 (MST)
- Postcode: 47000
- Website: www.klkland.com.my/bsc/

Bandar Seri Coalfields is a township in Sungai Buloh, Selangor, Malaysia. Located in the north-western corridor of the Klang Valley, it neighbours townships such as Puncak Alam, Bandar Saujana Utama, Bandar Tasik Puteri and the City of Elmina. Despite bearing the postal address of Sungai Buloh, the township falls under the local administrative jurisdiction of the Kuala Selangor Municipal Council.

== Background and development ==
Bandar Seri Coalfields is a 1,001-acre township that forms part of a larger 6,500 acres (2,600 ha) development project owned by Kuala Lumpur Kepong Berhad (KLK Land). The township was developed over former palm oil plantation land historically known as the Tuan Mee Estate. Officially launched in 2011, the township has an estimated population of 10,300 residents as of 2025.

The township is structured into several residential and commercial precincts. Precinct 1 and Precinct 3 consist of various residential phases, including the Hibiscus, Banyan, Bromelia, Duranta, Oleander, Ixora, and Senna housing developments. Precinct 2 serves as a mixed-use zone featuring residential units like Areca and Banyan 2, alongside commercial areas such as the BSC Waterfront Shops and BSC Central. The northern section of the township, known as North Haven, includes residential enclaves such as Hemmingway Residences, Hampton Residences, The Walden, Jardin Residences, and Quinton Residences.

The township also houses the Selangor state government's affordable housing scheme known as Rumah Selangorku (RSKU). As of 2026, there are a total of 498 units across two completed phases of the Hibiscus terrace homes.

== Amenities ==
Coalfields Retail Park

The commercial area of the township includes the BSC Waterfront Shops, located in Precinct 2, which house convenience stores, clinics, automotive service centres, and food and beverage outlets. This was followed by the completion of BSC Central in 2018. An upcoming commercial addition is the Coalfields Retail Park, a shopping mall situated between the BSC Waterfront Shops and BSC Central. Scheduled to open on 10 September 2026, the mall will feature supermarkets, retail outlets, an ice-skating rink, and an indoor playground. Additional commercial facilities nearby include the KIPMall Desa Coalfields and local petrol stations.

Educational institutions operating in the township include the Wesley Methodist Private School and a Tamil primary school, SJK(T) Ladang Coalfields. To accommodate the population, new schools are being developed within the township's designated education hub. A new Chinese primary school, SJK(C) Lee Loy Seng, is currently under construction and expected to be operational by 2028. In September 2025, an agreement was signed to establish a branch campus of Kuen Cheng High School in Bandar Seri Coalfields. The independent Chinese secondary school is projected to welcome its first batch of approximately 500 students in the 2027 academic year.

Recreational facilities include a 50-acre central park and the BSC Clubhouse, which provides sports and leisure amenities such as a swimming pool, gymnasium, and courts for badminton, tennis, and basketball. A sports booking facility, Footballhub @ Bandar Seri Coalfields, is also available for football and futsal.

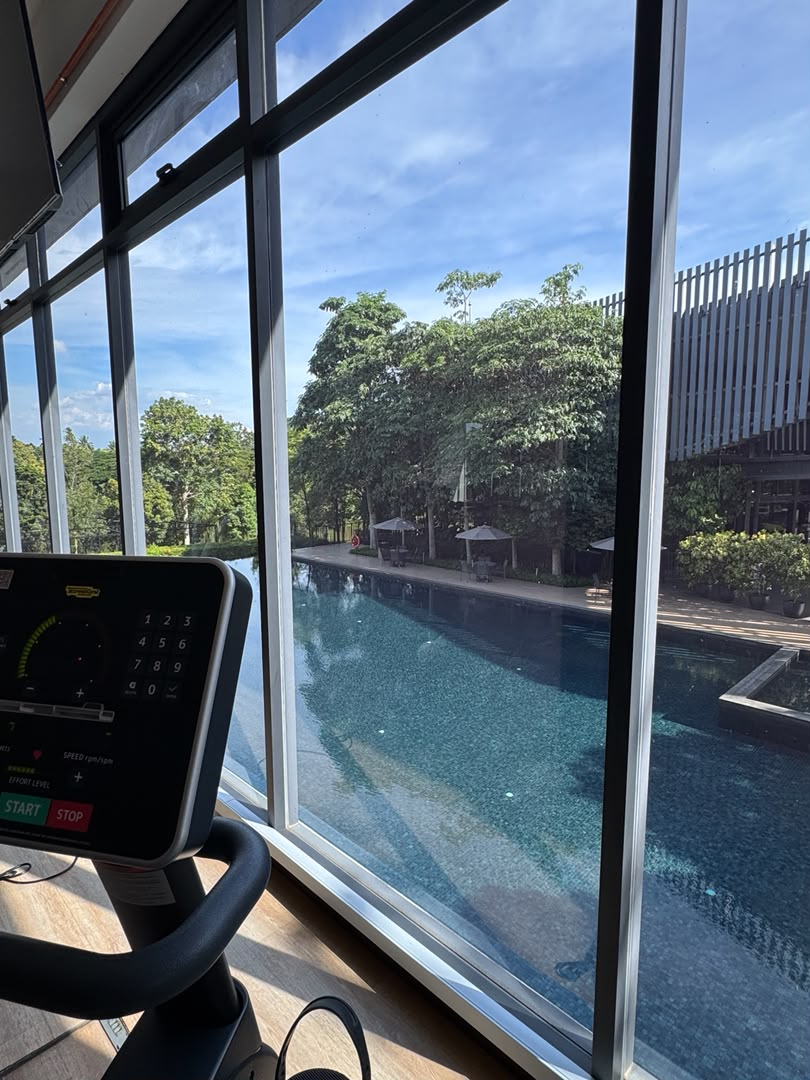
View of the swimming pool from the gym at BSC Clubhouse

Places of worship within the township include the Masjid At-Taufiqiah, the BSC Chinese Methodist Church, St. Anthony's Catholic Church, and the Kuil Sri Maha Mariamman.

== Accessibility ==
Bandar Seri Coalfields is located along Federal Route 54 (Jalan Kuala Selangor–Kepong). It is connected to several expressways, including the Kuala Lumpur–Kuala Selangor Expressway (LATAR), the Guthrie Corridor Expressway (GCE), the New Klang Valley Expressway (NKVE), the Damansara–Shah Alam Elevated Expressway (DASH), and the West Coast Expressway (WCE).

For public transportation, the nearest rail stations are the KA09 Kuang Komuter station and the KA08 PY04 Sungai Buloh station. The latter can be accessed via the Rapid KL feeder bus route T155, which connects the MRT Sungai Buloh station to Kota Puteri, passing through Bandar Seri Coalfields.
