= Kuala Lumpur Kepong Berhad =

Malaysian multi-national company

- Type: Public limited company
- Traded as: MYX: 2445
- ISIN: MYL2445OO004
- Industry: Plantation (core business), manufacturing (resource-based), property, retailing
- Predecessor: The Kuala Lumpur Rubber Company, Limited (KLR) (1906–1960); Kuala Lumpur-Kepong Amalgamated Limited (KLKA) (1960–1973)
- Founded: 1906
- Headquarters: Wisma Taiko, No. 1, Jalan S.P. Seenivasagam, 30000 Ipoh, Perak, Malaysia
- Key people: R. M. Alias, Chairman; Lee Oi Hian, CEO
- Revenue: ▲MYR 7,490.6 million (2010)
- Operating income: ▲MYR 1,409.2 million(2010)
- Net income: ▲MYR 1,012.3 million (2010)
- Total assets: MYR 5,440,741 million (2010)
- Number of employees: 38,000
- Website: www.klk.com.my

Kuala Lumpur Kepong Berhad (KLK) (MYX: 2445) is a Malaysian multi-national company. The core business of the group is plantation (oil palm and rubber). The company has plantations that cover more than 250,000 hectares in Malaysia (both Peninsular and Sabah) and Indonesia (Belitung, Sumatra and Kalimantan). Since the 1990s, the company has diversified its business activities such as resource-based manufacturing (oleochemicals, derivatives and speciality chemicals), property development and retailing (personal care products, toiletries and fine foods) with worldwide presence. The company is listed on the Bursa Malaysia and is Malaysia's third-largest palm oil producer. KLK was ranked 1858th in the 2013 Forbes Global 2000 Leading Companies, with market cap of US$6.91 billion. In 2014, KLK was ranked 23rd most valuable Malaysia brand on the Malaysia 100 2014 with a brand value of US$364 million. The late Thong Yaw Hong, (former) secretary general of the Malaysian Treasury, sat on the board of KLK. Lee Oi Hian, the CEO of KLK, is or was chairman of the board of trustees of the Malaysian Palm Oil Council.

== History ==
=== The Kuala Lumpur Rubber Company, Limited (KLR) (1906–1960) ===
KLR was founded in London, in 1906 to oversee some 600 ha. plantations (rubber and coffee) in Malaya (now Malaysia). In 1907, the shares of KLR were listed on the London Stock Exchange.

=== Kuala Lumpur-Kepong Amalgamated Limited (KLKA) (1960–1973) ===
In 1960, KLR changed its name to KLKA. The group started to plant oil palm in Fraser Estate. The group's first mill, the Fraser Mill was opened in 1967. In 1971, KLKA opened its Head Office in Kuala Lumpur. The next year, KLKA's tax residence was transferred from the United Kingdom to Malaysia.

=== Kuala Lumpur Kepong Berhad (KLK) (1973–present) ===
In 1973, Kuala Lumpur Kepong Berhad (KLK) was incorporated in Malaysia and under a Scheme of Reconstruction, KLKA went into voluntary liquidation with KLK taking over the assets and liabilities of KLKA. The company's shares is listed on the stock exchanges of Kuala Lumpur, Singapore and London. In 1979, the Head Office was moved from Kuala Lumpur to Ladang Pinji, Perak.

== Business activities ==
=== Plantation ===
Plantation is the core business of KLK. Currently, KLK has more than 250,000 ha. of plantations areas in Malaysia and Indonesia. The annual production for fresh fruit bunches (FFB) is 3.1 million tonnes. KLK's own mills and refineries will then process the crop into crude palm oil, RBD palm olein and stearin, and kernel oil and cake. Meanwhile, in 2010, the production of rubber was approximately 23 million kg. It is among the few companies, that have been prosecuted for open burning so far. As of September 2010, the geographical distribution of the group's plantations is as follows:

Region	Area (ha.)	Percentage	Total
Peninsular Malaysia	69,261	28%	248,746 (100%)
Sabah, Malaysia	40,359	16%	248,746 (100%)
Indonesia	139,126	56%	248,746 (100%)

=== Resource-based manufacturing ===
==== Oleochemicals ====
The logo of "KLK Oleo", the oleochemicals branch of KLK Berhad.

The core division of the sector is KLK Oleo, one of the largest palm oil based oleochemicals producer in the world. KLK marked it entrance into oleochemicals back in 1991, with the opening of Palm-Oleo Sdn. Bhd. Currently, KLK Oleo consists of nine companies, six in Malaysia, two in China and one in Europe (situated in Emmerich am Rhein, Germany). The full list of the companies is shown below.

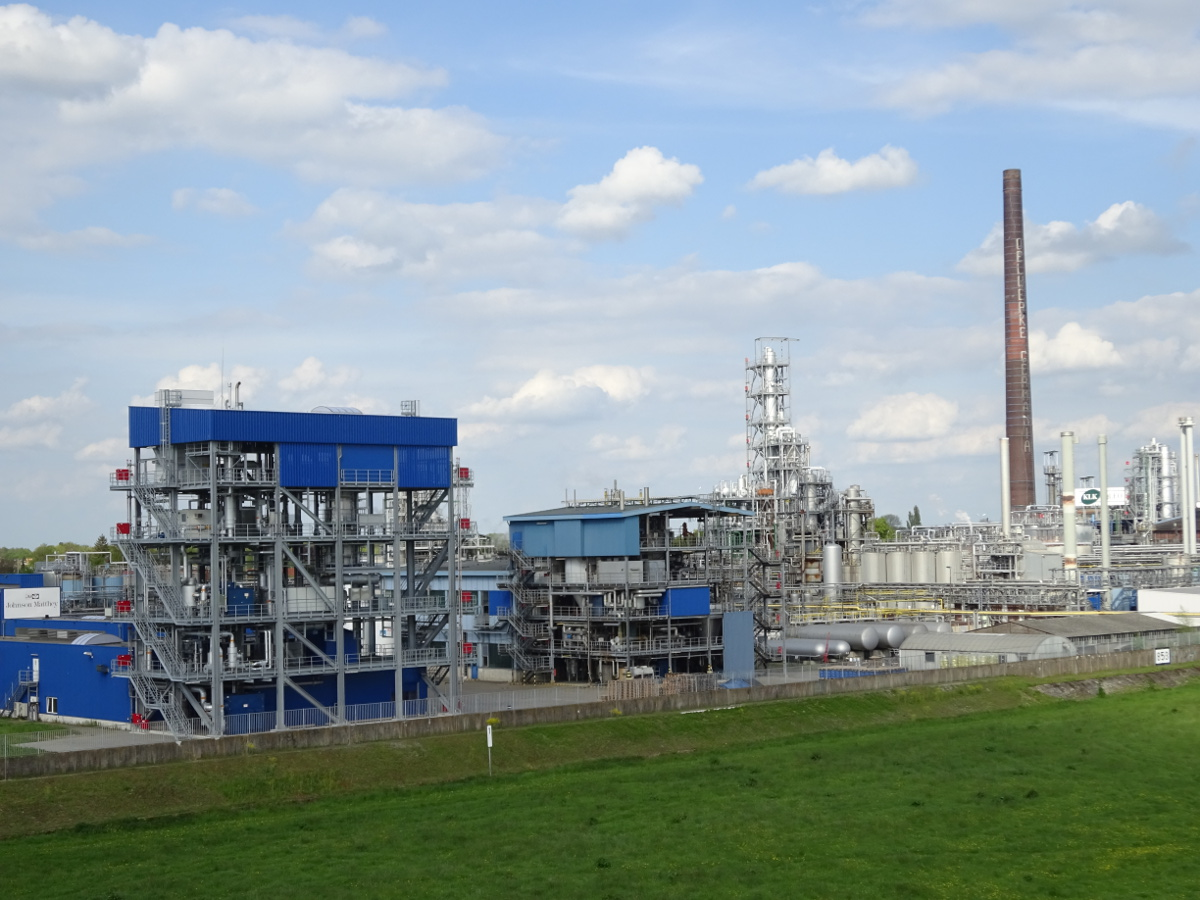
KLK Emmerich GmbH.

Country	Company	Business
Malaysia	Palm-Oleo Sdn. Bhd.	Fatty acids & glycerin
Malaysia	KSP Manufacturing Sdn. Bhd.	Soap Noodles
Malaysia	Palmamide Sdn. Bhd.	Ethylene Bis-Stearamide & Alkanolamides (Diethanolamides/Monoethanolamides)
Malaysia	KL-Kepong Oleomas Sdn. Bhd.	Fatty Alcohols, Methyl Esters & Methyl Ester Sulfonate
Malaysia	Palm-Oleo (Klang) Sdn. Bhd.	Fatty Acids, Glycerine, Soap Noodles & Fatty Esters
Malaysia	KLK Bioenergy Sdn. Bhd.	Biodiesel
China	Taiko Palm-Oleo (Zhangjiagang) Co., Ltd.	Fatty acids and glycerine, soap noodles, & soap bars
China	Shanghai Jinshan Jingwei Chemical Co., Ltd.	Amines, dimethylacetamide, esters, & surfactants
Germany	KLK Emmerich GmbH	Fatty acids, hydrogenated fatty acids & glycerine

==== Others ====
KLK also owns Dr. W. Kolb Holding AG, a producer of nonionic surfactant with their headquarters in Switzerland and Stolthaven (Westport) Sdn. Bhd., a common user liquid storage terminal at Westport, Port Klang.

The production factories of Dr.W.Kolb AG are located below:

- Dr.W.Kolb Moerdijk (The Netherlands)
- Dr.W.Kolb Specialties Delden (The Netherlands)

=== Property ===
KLK Land is the property development arm of Kuala Lumpur Kepong Berhad. KLK diversified into property development to leverage its land bank, particularly in the 1990s. KLK Land has been involved in developing townships like Sierramas, Desa Coalfields, and the ongoing Bandar Seri Coalfields in Sungai Buloh, Selangor and Caledonia in Ijok, Kuala Selangor.

As of 2025, KLK Land announced two industrial projects. One is a joint development with AME Elite Consortium, a Johor based developer to develop an industrial park in Ijok, Kuala Selangor. The other is KLK TechPark, a 1,500-acre integrated industrial hub in Tanjong Malim, Perak. It is designed to support the growth of the automotive sector, with BYD Auto confirmed as the anchor investor for Phase 1.

=== Retailing ===
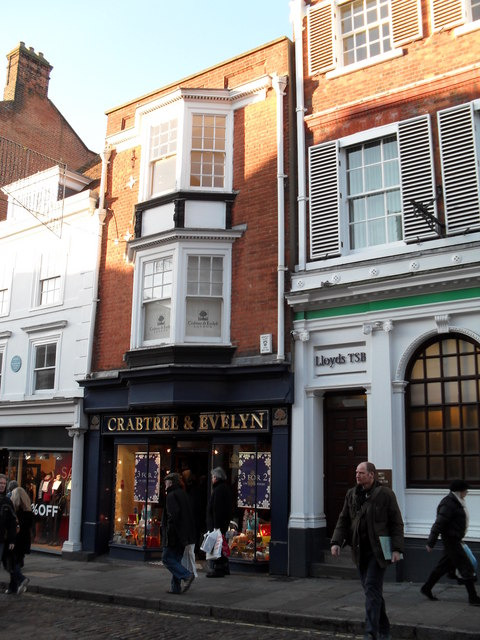
Crabtree & Evelyn in Guildford High Street

Crabtree & Evelyn is a retailer of personal care products, toiletries, home fragrance products and fine foods with the headquarters in Woodstock, Connecticut, USA. The brand is sold in 40 countries. In early 2012, the Crabtree & Evelyn business was sold to Khuan Choo International Limited for US$155 million.
