= Kuala Selangor (disambiguation) =

Kuala Selangor is a town in northwestern Selangor, Malaysia.

Kuala Selangor may also refer to:

- Kuala Selangor District
- Kuala Selangor (federal constituency), represented in the Dewan Rakyat
