= Sungai Buloh =

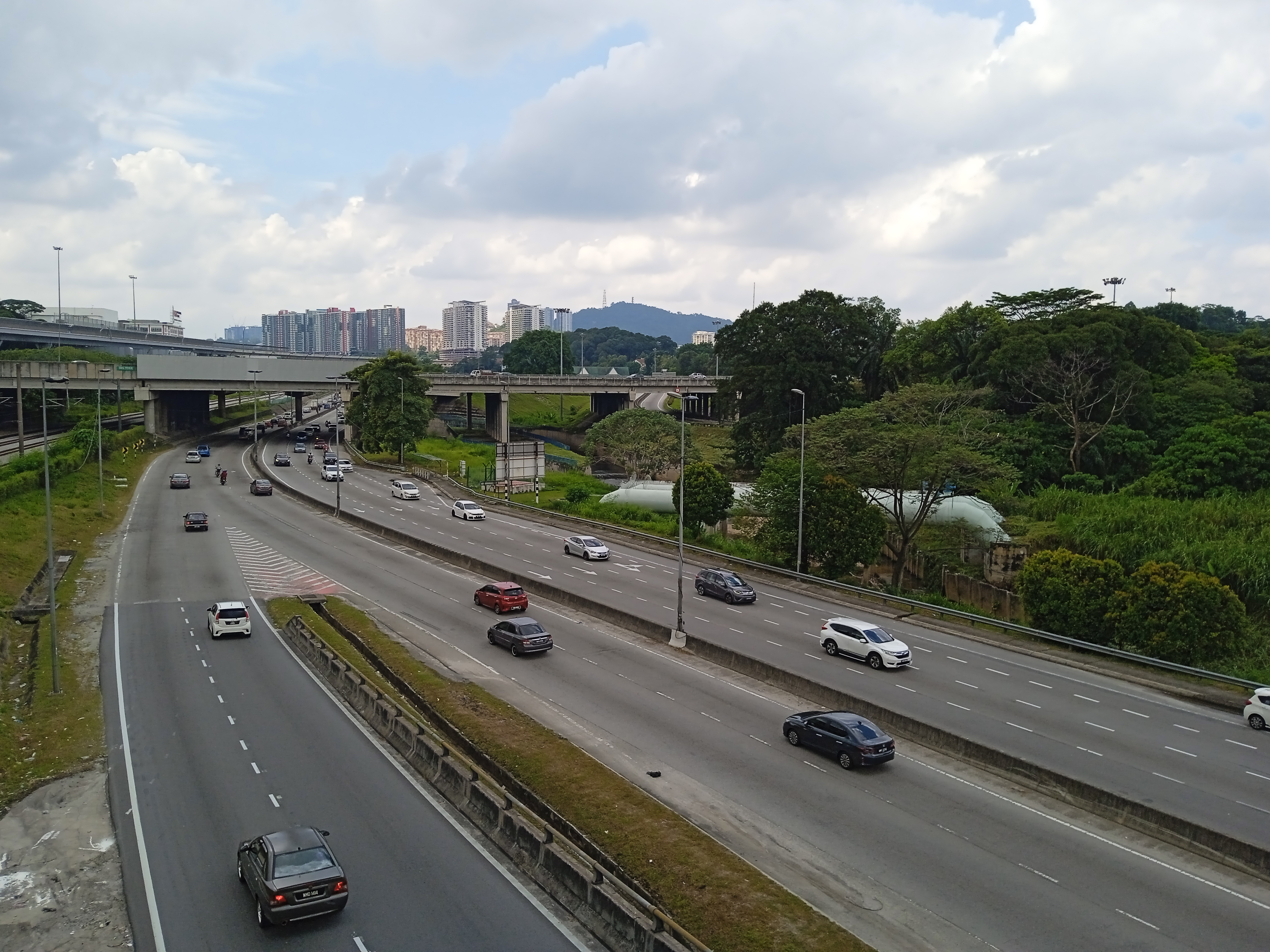
- Jalan Kuala Selangor in Sungai Buloh, from Entrance B of Sungai Buloh Station

- Location in Selangor Location in Peninsular Malaysia Location in Malaysis
- Coordinates: 3°12′36″N 101°32′59″E
- Country: Malaysia
- State: Selangor
- District: Petaling; Gombak; Kuala Selangor
- Establishment: Unclear, 19th century.
- Time zone: UTC+8 (MST)
- Postcode: 40160, 47000
- Area codes: +603-60, +603-614, +603-615

Sungai Buloh, or Sungei Buloh, is a town, a mukim (commune) and a parliamentary constituency in the northern part of Petaling District, Selangor, Malaysia. The name itself means bamboo river in the Malay language. It is located 16 km NW of downtown Kuala Lumpur and 8 km north of the Subang Airport, along the Kuala Selangor highway.

Bordering Damansara, Kepong, Kuang and Kuala Selangor, Sungai Buloh is notable for its colonial-era leper colony, one of the largest in the country.

== History ==
No clear historical records regarding Sungai Buloh's founding and settlement were available, though railway services had reached Sungai Buloh by the 1890s.

Many believe that Sungai Buloh got its name from Sungai Buloh river that flows from the Straits of Malacca through Kuala Selangor District. A town in Jeram in Kuala Selangor where the estuary of Sungai Buloh begins was also named after the river.

In 1930, in an isolated valley of Bukit Lagong, Sungai Buloh, a group of Malays, Chinese, Indians, Eurasians and Turks set up a contained community in the wake of the 1926 Leper Enactment Act, which required the segregation and treatment of those with the disease.

Sungai Buloh was at one point, the second biggest leprosy settlement in the world. It was equipped with advanced facilities and remained a research centre for leprosy until today. Sungei Buloh was a pioneer project based on the "enlightened policy" of segregating leprosy patients in a self-supporting community following the principles of a garden city.

In 1935 and 1936, scrip (voucher) was issued specifically for the settlement.

Sungai Buloh was the site of the Bright Sparklers Firework factory explosion in May 1991 and the subsequent fire.

The newer Bandar Baru Sungai Buloh was built on portions of the Sungai Buloh reserve forest with the land space of 1,588 hectares at a cost of RM 1 billion. It was launched in July 1993.

Sungai Buloh was also the site of the 2023 Elmina plane crash. A Learjet private plane crashed onto a major feeder road leading into the housing project just before landing at Subang Airport nearby; 10 people were killed, including 8 people on the aircraft and 2 on the ground. One of the fatalities is Pahang assemblyman Datuk Seri Johari Harun from Pelangai, Bentong.

== Geography ==
=== Location and geographical definition ===
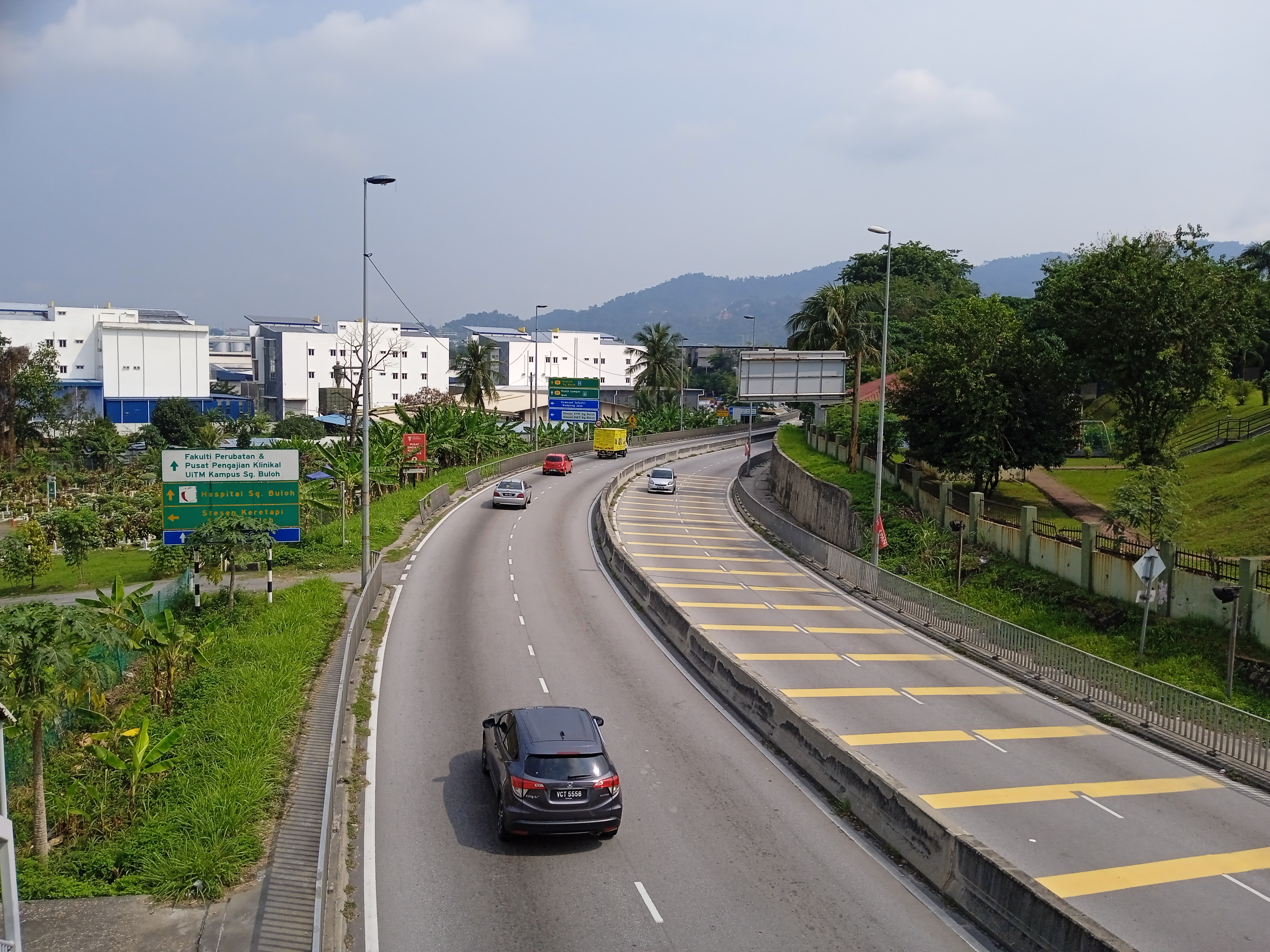
Jalan Hospital in Sungai buloh.

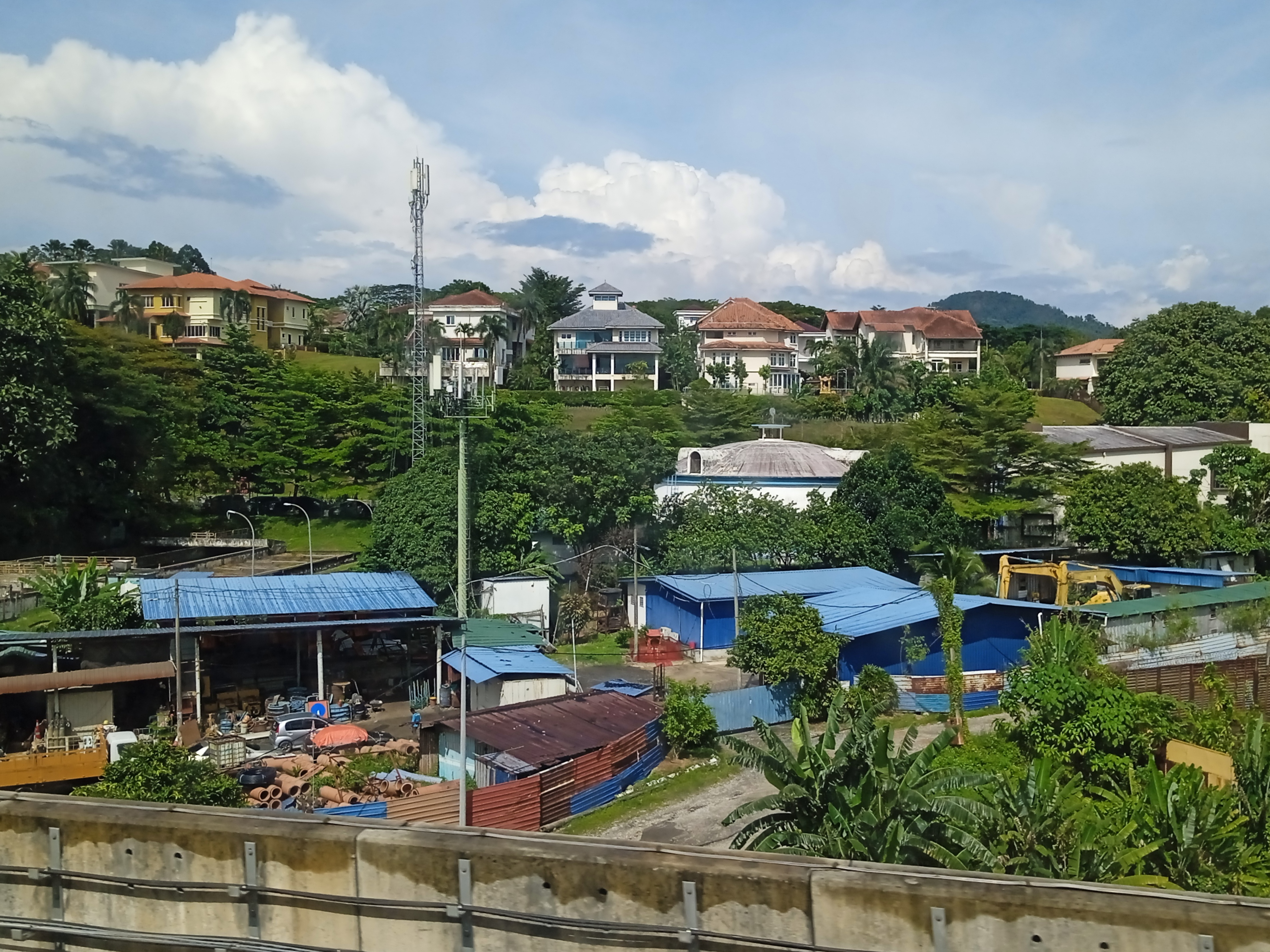
Sierramas

Sungai Buloh is located at the northern quarter of the Petaling District, bordering Damansara, Subang, Kuang and Kepong (across the Selangor-Federal Territory border).

Neighbourhoods and residential areas of Sungai Buloh include:

- Bukit Rahman Putra
- Damansara Damai
- Bandar Sri Damansara
- Bandar Baru Sungai Buloh
- Paya Jaras
- Desa Aman
- Kwasa Damansara
- Taman Villa Putra
- Sierramas
- Valencia
- Aman Putri

Most of these neighbourhoods are guarded and gated to provide the safest hospitality for the residents. Though often included as part of Sungai Buloh, the wards of Matang Pagar, Bandar Saujana Utama and Bandar Seri Coalfields, are actually part of the neighbouring towns of Kuang and Kuala Selangor respectively. The nearby township of Kota Damansara, though rarely included as part of Sungai Buloh, falls under the same parliamentary constituency as Sungai Buloh itself.

== Education ==
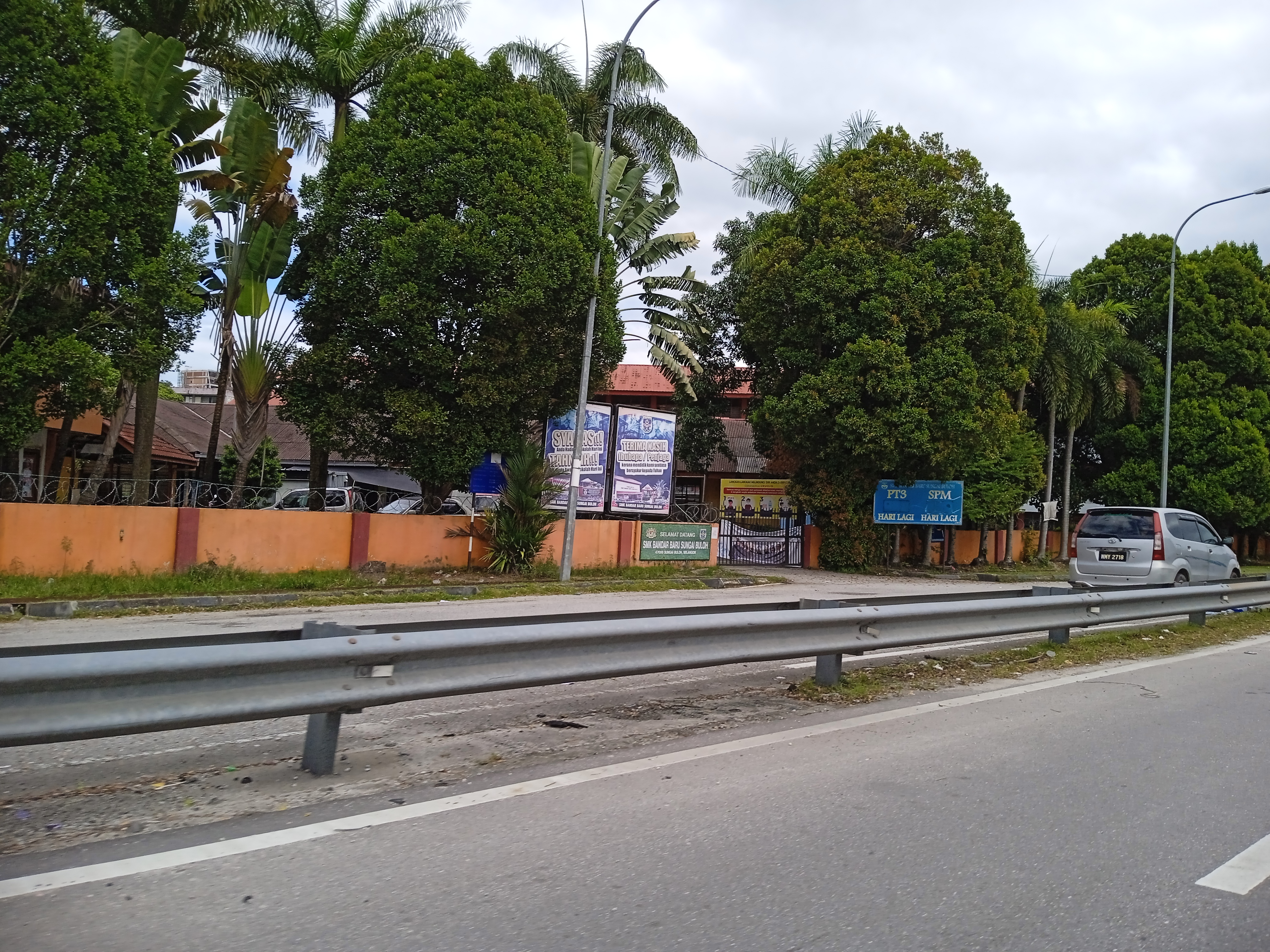
SMK Bandar Baru Sungai Buloh

Public Primary Schools

- SK Sungai Buloh
- SK Bandar Baru Sungai Buloh
- SK Bukit Rahman Putra
- SJK(T) Saraswathy
- SK Kuang
- SK Sungai Pelong
- SJK(C) Sungai Buloh

Public Secondary Schools

- SMK Sierramas
- SMK Bandar Baru Sungai Buloh
- SMK Bukit Rahman Putra
- SMK Bukit Gading

Private Schools

- ELC International School
- IGB International School

== Accessibility ==
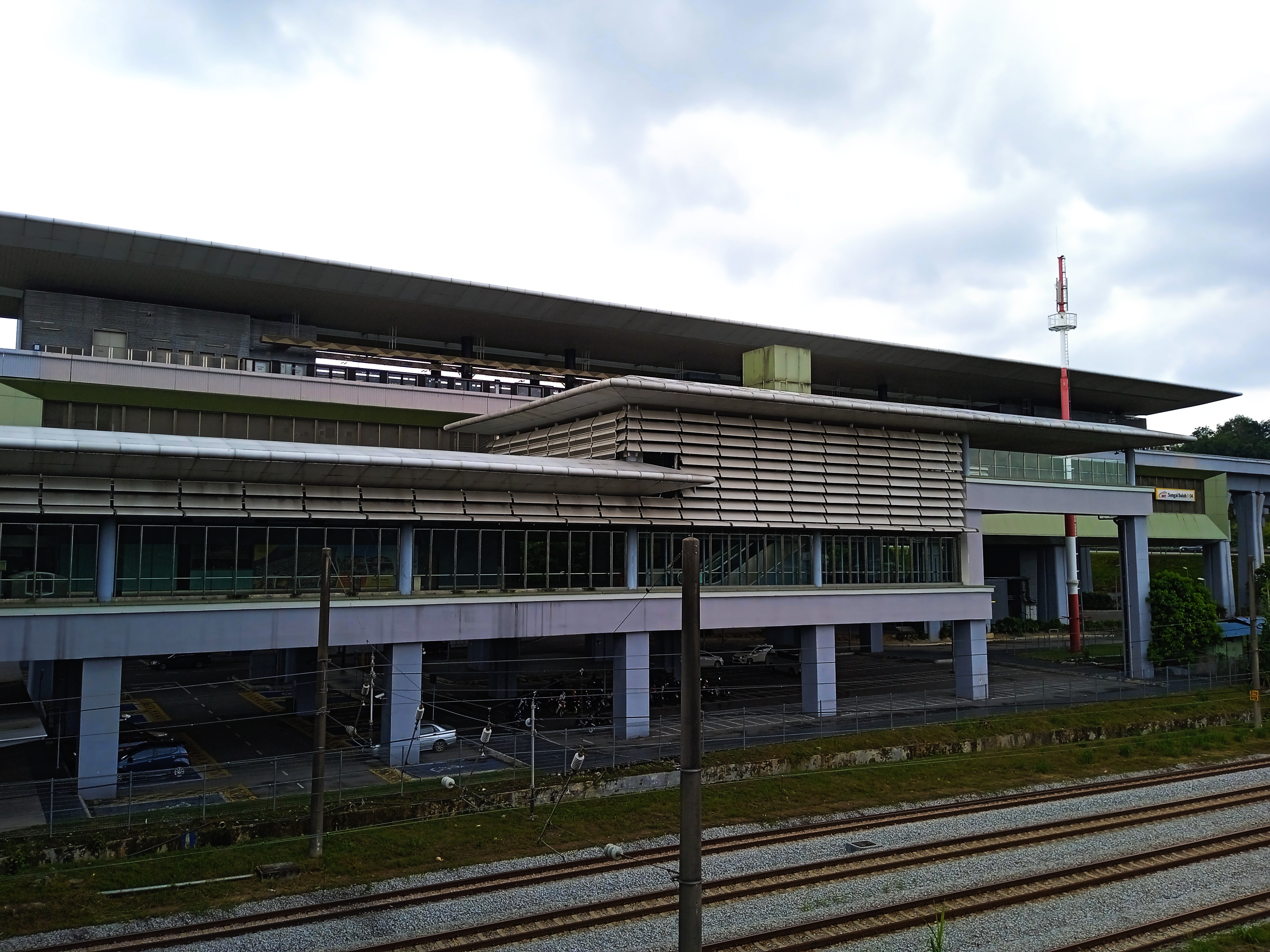
Sungai Buloh railway station

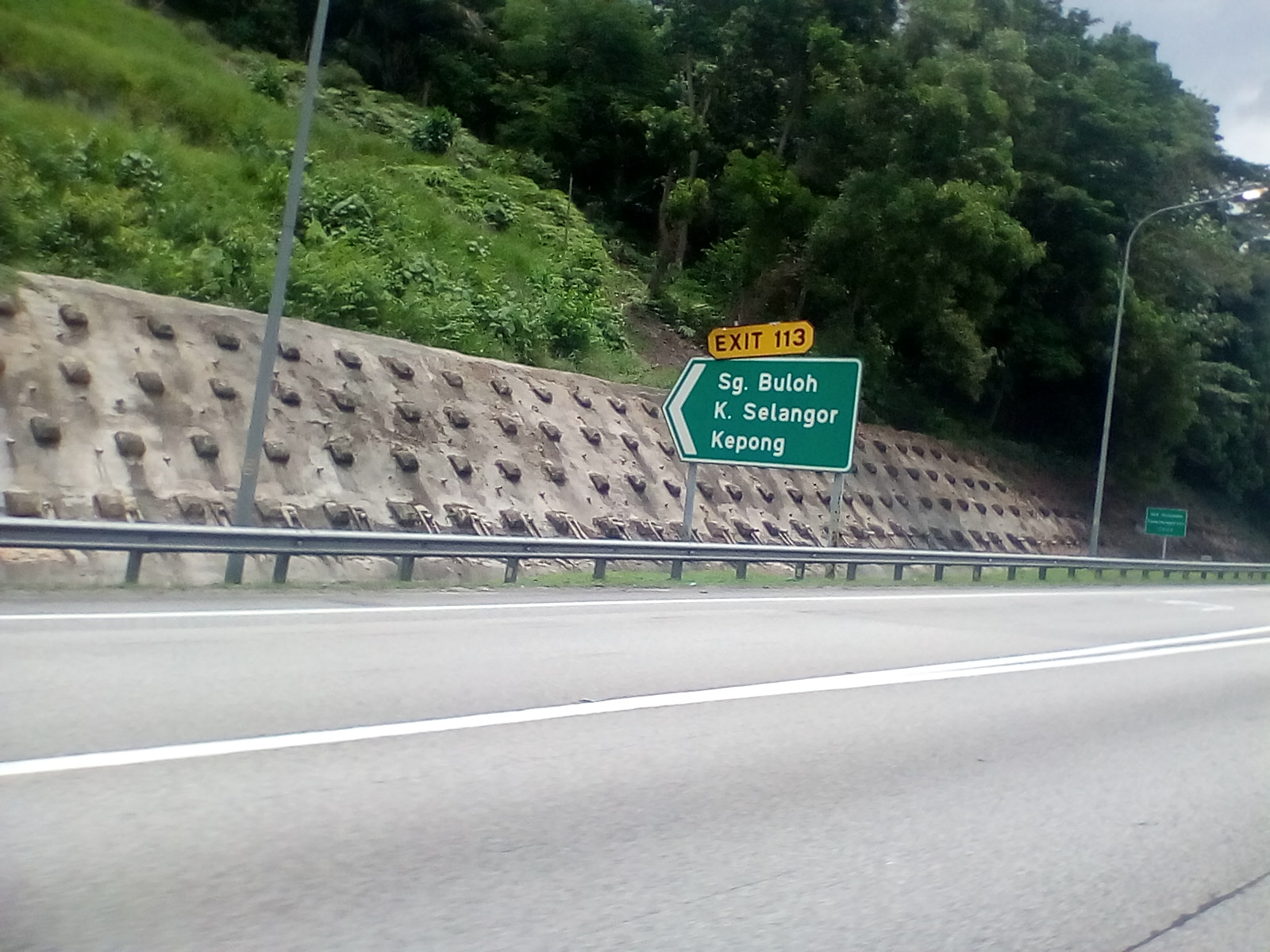
Interchange in North–South Expressway Northern Route.

=== Public transport ===
Sungai Buloh railway station is the main railway station serving the town with services by the KTM Komuter Port Klang Line and the Putrajaya line. Limited KTM ETS high speed rail services are also available.

=== Car ===
The Kepong-Kuala Selangor highway Federal Route 54 runs through Sungai Buloh area, intersecting with Federal Route 15 (to Subang Airport and Subang Jaya). North–South Expressway Northern Route exit 113 serves the city.

== Governance ==
=== Local authority ===
Due to its unclear geographical definition, what is considered as Sungai Buloh, falls under jurisdiction of four local authorities:

- Majlis Bandaraya Shah Alam (Shah Alam City Council, MBSA), covering Bandar Baru Sungai Buloh, Bukit Rahman Putra, Kampung Baru Sungai Buloh, the Sungai Buloh military base, Paya Jaras, and Kwasa Damansara.
- Majlis Bandaraya Petaling Jaya (Petaling Jaya City Council, MBPJ), covering Kampung Selamat, Bandar Sri Damansara, Damansara Damai, and the railway/MRT station.
- Majlis Perbandaran Selayang (Selayang Municipal Council, MPS), covering Hospital Sungai Buloh, Valencia, Sierramas, Taman Matang Jaya and Taman Impian Indah and the Sungai Buloh Prison complex. Note that these locations are closer to, and often included as part of, Kuang, rather than Sungai Buloh.
- Majlis Perbandaran Kuala Selangor (Kuala Selangor Municipal Council, MPKS), covering some far western areas near Puncak Alam such as Bandar Saujana Utama and Bandar Seri Coalfields. These areas are technically not part of Sungai Buloh.

=== Politics ===
Sungai Buloh lends its name to, and is represented by the Sungai Buloh parliamentary constituency. The bulk of Sungai Buloh town is within the Paya Jaras state constituency, which is also one of two state seats in the parliamentary constituency; though part of the town also spills into neighbouring Selayang constituency.

== See also ==
- Culion leper colony
- Jerejak Island
- Kajang
