= Malaysia Federal Route 54 =

Road in Malaysia

Federal Route 54
- Jalan Kuala Selangor–Kepong (Jalan Kepong (Kuala Lumpur))
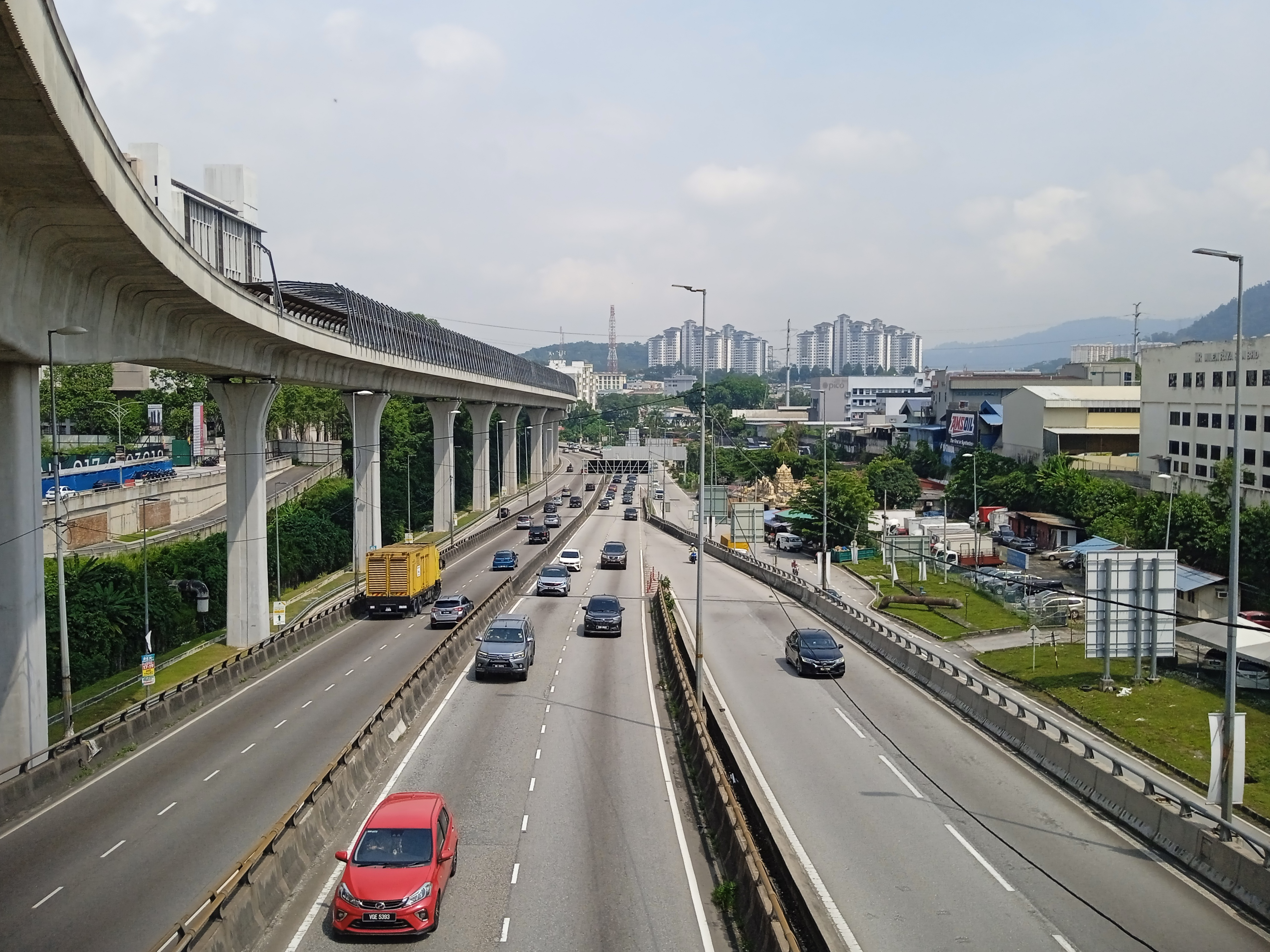

Route information
- Maintained by Malaysian Public Works Department
- Length: 45.60 km (28.33 mi)

Major junctions
- West end: Asam Jawa, Kuala Selangor, Selangor
- FT 5 Federal Route 5 B77 State Route B77; Kuala Lumpur–Kuala Selangor Expressway; B109 State Route B109; B35 State Route B35; B111 State Route B111; B1 State Route B1; Guthrie Corridor Expressway; B25 State Route B25; FT 15 Federal Route 15; North–South Expressway Northern Route / AH2; Damansara–Puchong Expressway; Duta–Ulu Klang Expressway; FT 28 Kuala Lumpur Middle Ring Road 2 Segambut Bypass; FT 1 Kuala Lumpur–Rawang Highway; Jalan Ipoh
- East end: Kepong Roundabout, Kuala Lumpur

Location
- Country: Malaysia
- Primary destinations: Bukit Rotan, Ijok, Paya Jaras, Sungai Buloh, Damansara, Kepong, Batu Caves

Highway system
- Highways in Malaysia; Expressways; Federal; State

Federal Route 54, or Jalan Kuala Selangor–Kepong or Jalan Kepong in Kuala Lumpur side, is a main federal road in Selangor, Malaysia. The road connects Asam Jawa near Kuala Selangor to Kepong near Kuala Lumpur. It is a main route to Kuala Lumpur from Federal Route 5. Federal Route 54 became the backbone of the road system linking Kuala Selangor to Kuala Lumpur before being surpassed by the Kuala Lumpur–Kuala Selangor Expressway (LATAR Expressway) E25 in 2011.

The Kilometre Zero of the Federal Route 54 is located at Assam Jawa in Kuala Selangor, at its interchange with the Federal Route 5, the main trunk road of the west coast of Peninsular Malaysia.

== Features ==
At most sections, the Federal Route 54 was built under the JKR R5 road standard, allowing maximum speed limit of up to 90 km/h.

There is one overlap: Sri Damansara–Kepong: Federal Route 28 Kuala Lumpur Middle Ring Road 2

There is no other alternate route for Federal Route 54, and there are no sections with motorcycle lanes. There have many dangerous bends onward from Ijok to Sungai Buloh until 2020 which Public Works Department was upgraded to four-lane road and build with straight line removing the bends.

== Junction and town lists ==
Legend:

- I/C - Interchange, I/S - Intersection, RSA - Rest and service area, OBR - Overhead bridge restaurant, R/R - Restaurant and rest plaza, L/B - Layby, V/P - Vista point, TN - tunnel, T/P - Toll plaza, BR - Bridge
- C - Cloverleaf, S - Stack, T-A - Trumpet-A, T-B - Trumpet-B, DT - Directional-T/Y, SDT - Semi-Directional-T/Y, P-Y - Partial-Y, D - Diamond, P-C - Partial cloverleaf, D-D - Diverging diamond, D-R - Direct ramp

States	District	Km	Exit	Name	Destinations	Notes
Selangor	Kuala Selangor	0.0	I/C	Kuala Selangor; Assam Jawa	FT 5 Malaysia Federal Route 5 – Teluk Intan, Sabak Bernam, Tanjung Karang, Kuala Selangor, Jeram, Kapar, Shah Alam, Klang	
Selangor	Kuala Selangor			Taman Rajawali		
Selangor	Kuala Selangor			Bukit Rotan	B77 Selangor State Route B77 – Kampung Kuantan, Kampung Kuantan fireflies, Taman Kasawari	
Selangor	Kuala Selangor			Bukit Rotan Estate		
Selangor	Kuala Selangor		I/C	Ijok-LATAR/WCE I/C	Kuala Lumpur–Kuala Selangor Expressway – Kuala Lumpur, Rawang, Shah Alam; West Coast Expressway – Taiping, Beruas, Teluk Intan, Klang, Shah Alam, Banting	Diamond interchange
Selangor	Kuala Selangor			Bukit Rotan Estate		
Selangor	Kuala Selangor			Jalan Parit Mahang	B109 Jalan Parit Mahang – Kampung Desa Mahang, Kampung Bukit Cerakah	
Selangor	Kuala Selangor			Ijok Estate		
Selangor	Kuala Selangor			Taman Koperasi Bena		
Selangor	Kuala Selangor			Ijok	B35 Selangor State Route B35 – Bukit Badong, Bestari Jaya, Sungai Tengi, University of Selangor (UNISEL)	
Selangor	Kuala Selangor			Kota Puteri	Kota Puteri	
Selangor	Kuala Selangor			Jalan Batu Arang	B111 Selangor State Route B111 – Batu Arang	
Selangor	Kuala Selangor			Puncak Alam-LATAR	Kuala Lumpur–Kuala Selangor Expressway – Kuala Selangor, Klang, Shah Alam, Kuala Lumpur, Rawang,	Trumpet interchange
Selangor	Kuala Selangor			Puncak Alam North	B1 Jalan Meru – Puncak Alam, Meru, Klang, Shah Alam; Persiaran Harum Pandan – Bandar Seri Coalfields	
Selangor	Kuala Selangor			Bandar Seri Coalfields	BSC Central	
Selangor	Kuala Selangor			Saujana Aman	Taman Saujana Aman	
Selangor	Kuala Selangor			Bandar Seri Coalfields	BSC Clubhouse	
Selangor	Kuala Selangor			Road Transport Department (JPJ) Ijok weighing station (westbound)		
Selangor	Kuala Selangor			Bandar Seri Coalfields	Persiaran Limau Kasturi – Desa Coalfields, Bandar Seri Coalfields	
Selangor	Kuala Selangor			Desa Coalfields	Persiaran Desa Coalfields 1 – Desa Coalfields	
Selangor	Petaling			Sungai Buloh Prison	Sungai Buloh Prison	
Selangor	Petaling			Bandar Saujana Utama	Jalan Bandar Saujana Putra – Bandar Saujana Utama	
Selangor	Petaling			Paya Jaras-GCE	Guthrie Corridor Expressway – Ipoh, Rawang, Subang, Bukit Jelutong, Shah Alam, Klang	Half-diamond interchange
Selangor	Petaling			Paya Jaras		
Selangor	Petaling			Sungai Pelong	B25 Selangor State Route B25 – Kuang, Rawang	
Selangor	Petaling			Sungai Buloh		
Selangor	Petaling			Bukit Rahman Putra	Persiaran Bukit Rahman Putra 1 – Bukit Rahman Putra	Half-diamond interchange
Selangor	Petaling			Bukit Rahman Putra–Sri Damansara	see also FT 54 Sungai Buloh Highway	
Selangor	Petaling			Sri Damansara	Persiaran Utama – Bandar Sri Damansara, Kepong Industrial Area; Damansara–Puchong Expressway – Desa Park City, Damansara, Petaling Jaya, Puchong, Putrajaya, Cyberjaya, Kuala Lumpur International Airport (KLIA)	Diamond interchange with ramp to MRR2
Selangor	Petaling			Bandar Menjalara	Jalan Taman Bukit Maluri – Taman Bukit Maluri, Bandar Menjalara, Desa Park City; Duta–Ulu Klang Expressway – Sri Damansara Link, KLCC, City Centre, Ampang, Ulu Klang, Gombak, Jalan Kuching, Segambut	Diamond interchange Elevated multi-level directional ramp expressway interchange
Selangor	Gombak			Kepong flyover	FT 28 Kuala Lumpur Middle Ring Road 2 – Ipoh, Batu Caves, Kuantan, Genting Highlands, Ampang, Cheras, Seremban	
Selangor	Gombak			Kepong Sentral station	P&R Kepong Sentral station KTM ETS	
Selangor	Gombak			Kepong; Kepong-MRR2	B21 Selangor State Route B21 – Taman Kepong Indah, Taman Daya, Bandar Baru Selayang, Forest Research Institute Malaysia (FRIM); FT 28 Kuala Lumpur Middle Ring Road 2 – Ipoh, Batu Caves, Kuantan, Genting Highlands, Ampang, Cheras, Seremban; Jalan Kepong Garden – Taman Kepong	Diamond interchange
Kuala Lumpur			BR	Sungai Keroh bridge		
Kuala Lumpur				Kepong		
Kuala Lumpur				Kepong; Jalan Metro Prima	Jalan Metro Prima – Kepong Metro Prima, Taman Kepong, Kepong Baru; P&R Metro Prima MRT station 12	
Kuala Lumpur				Kepong		
Kuala Lumpur				Kepong; Jalan Metro Perdana Barat	Jalan Metro Perdana Barat – Taman Fadason; Kepong Baru MRT station 12	
Kuala Lumpur				Kepong; Segambut Bypass	Segambut Bypass – Segambut; P&R Jinjang MRT station 12	
Kuala Lumpur				Jinjang; Jalan Jinjang Utama	Jalan Jinjang Permai – Kampung Baharu Jinjang	
Kuala Lumpur				Jinjang	Sri Delima MRT station 12	
Kuala Lumpur				Kuala Lumpur; Kepong Roundabout	Jalan Ipoh – Segambut, Sentul; FT 1 Kuala Lumpur–Rawang Highway – Ipoh, Rawang, Kuala Lumpur city centre, Cheras, Seremban	Roundabout interchange with ramp to FT1 through Kuala Lumpur

== Gallery ==
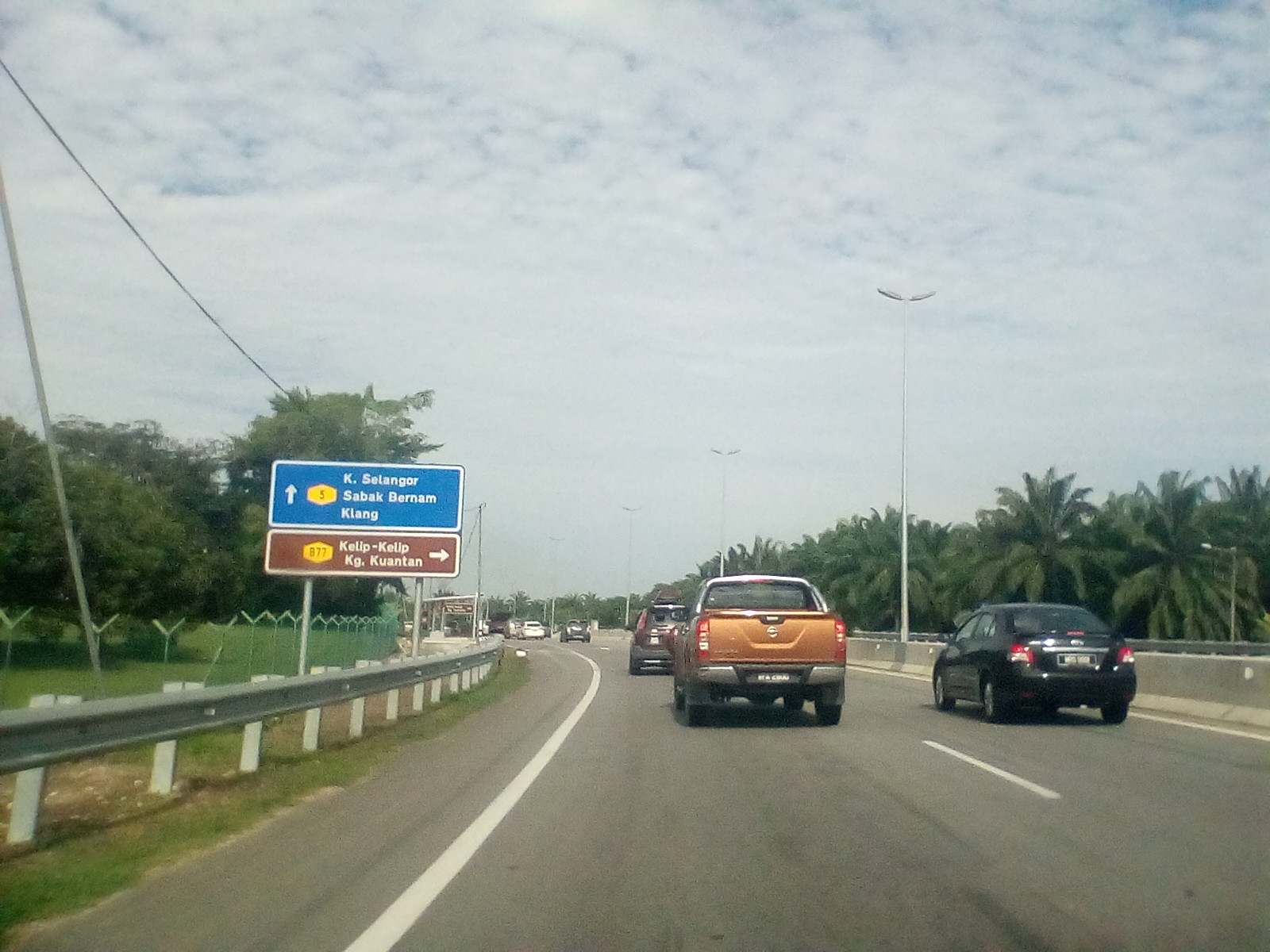
Kelip-Kelip Kampung Kuantan interchange, Bukit Rotan, Kuala Selangor.

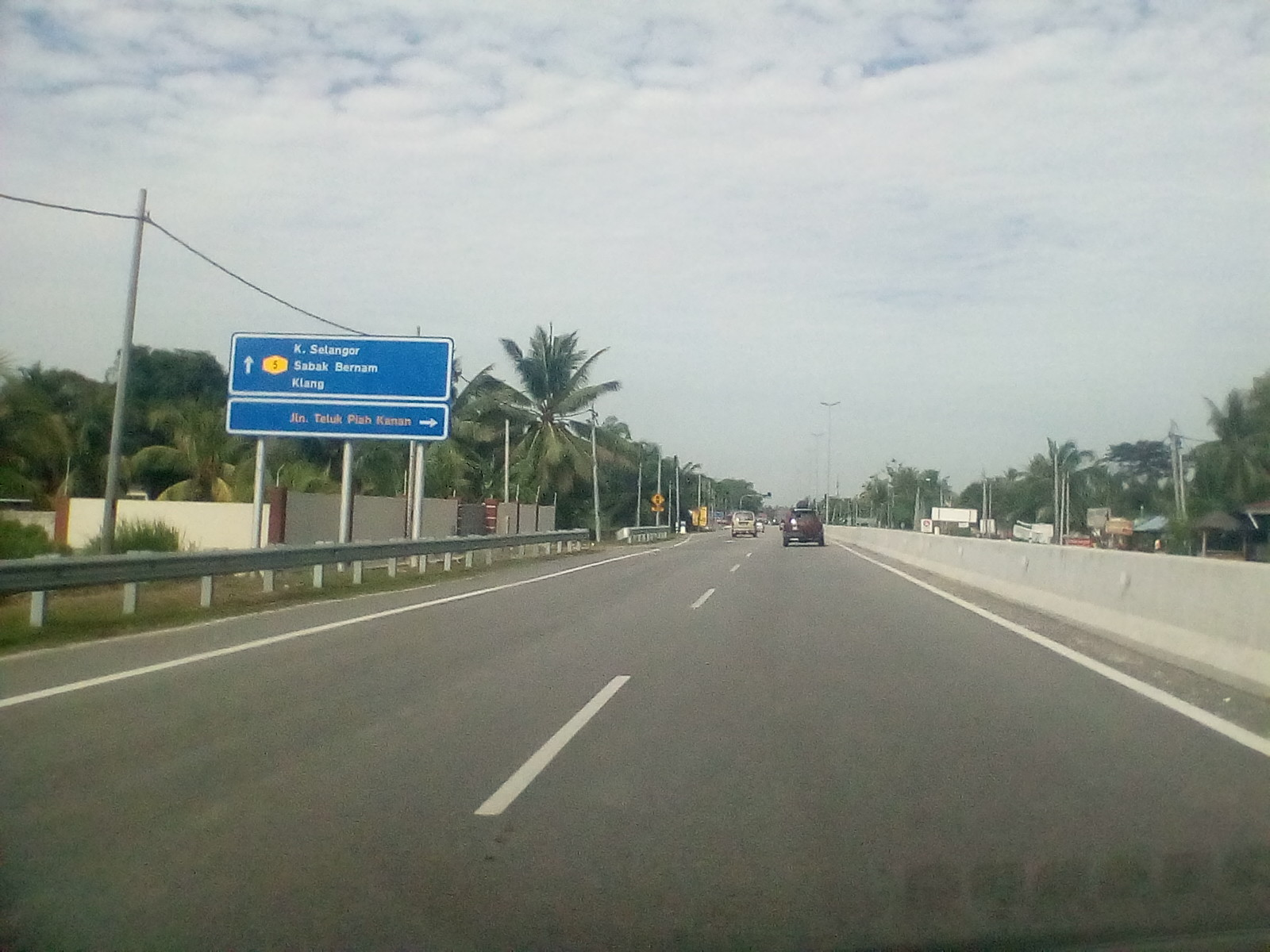
Jalan Teluk Piah Kanan interchange, Bukit Rotan, Kuala Selangor.

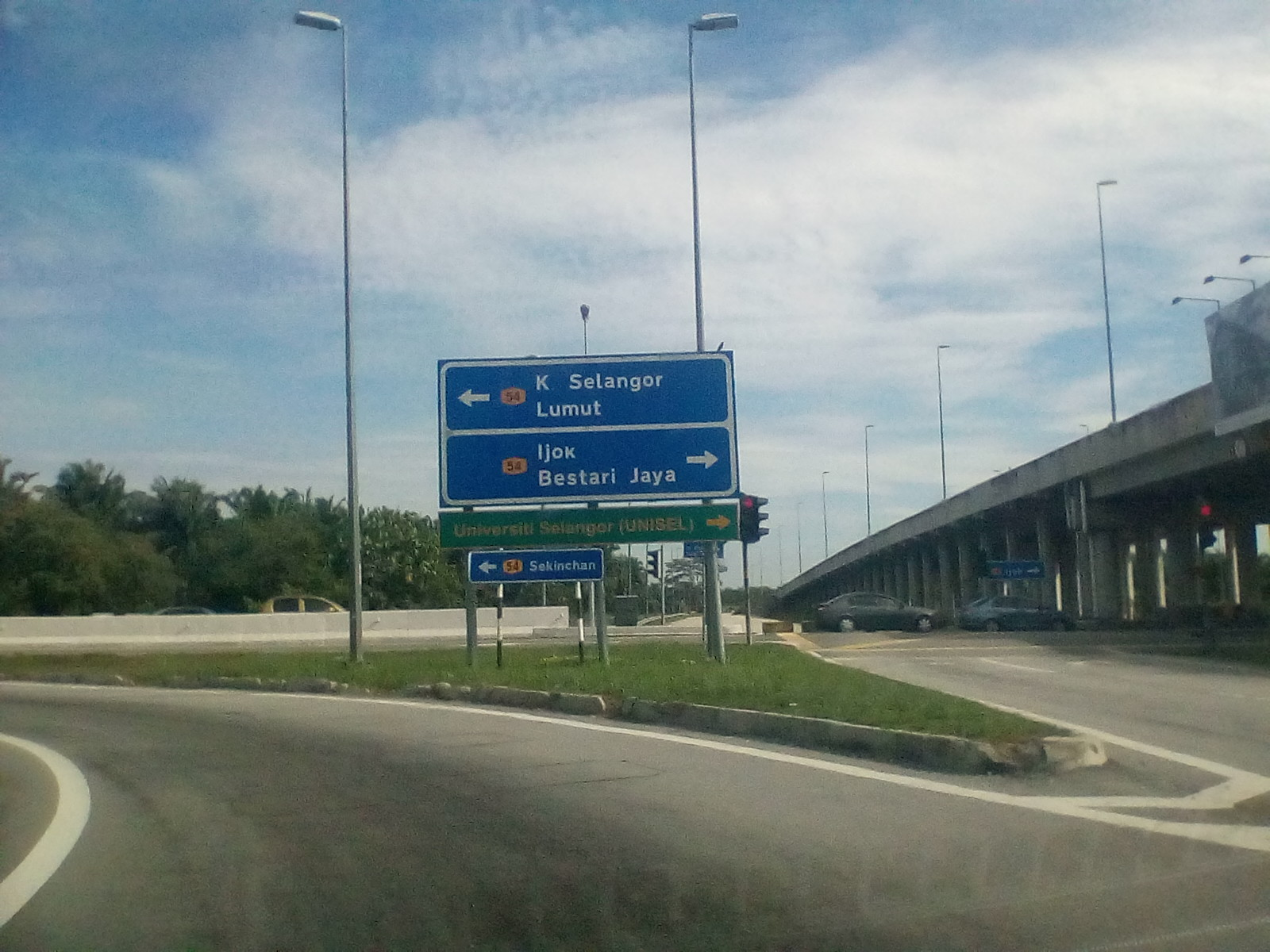
Road sign near the intersection with LATAR and WCE highways, near Assam Jawa.

Jalan Kuala Selangor towards Kepong and Kuala Lumpur direction near Sri Damansara Barat MRT station.

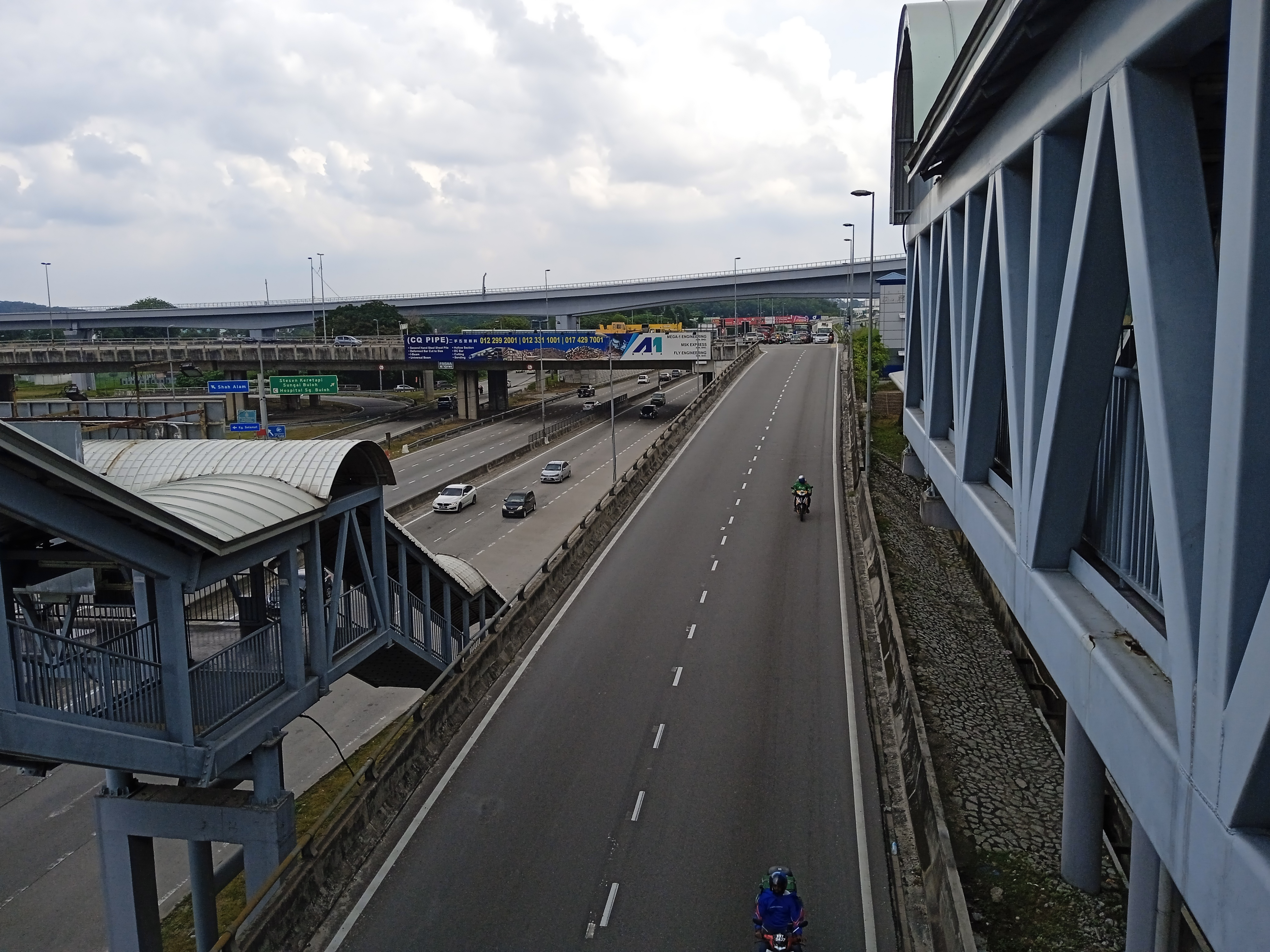
Jalan Sungai Buloh FT15 ends here.

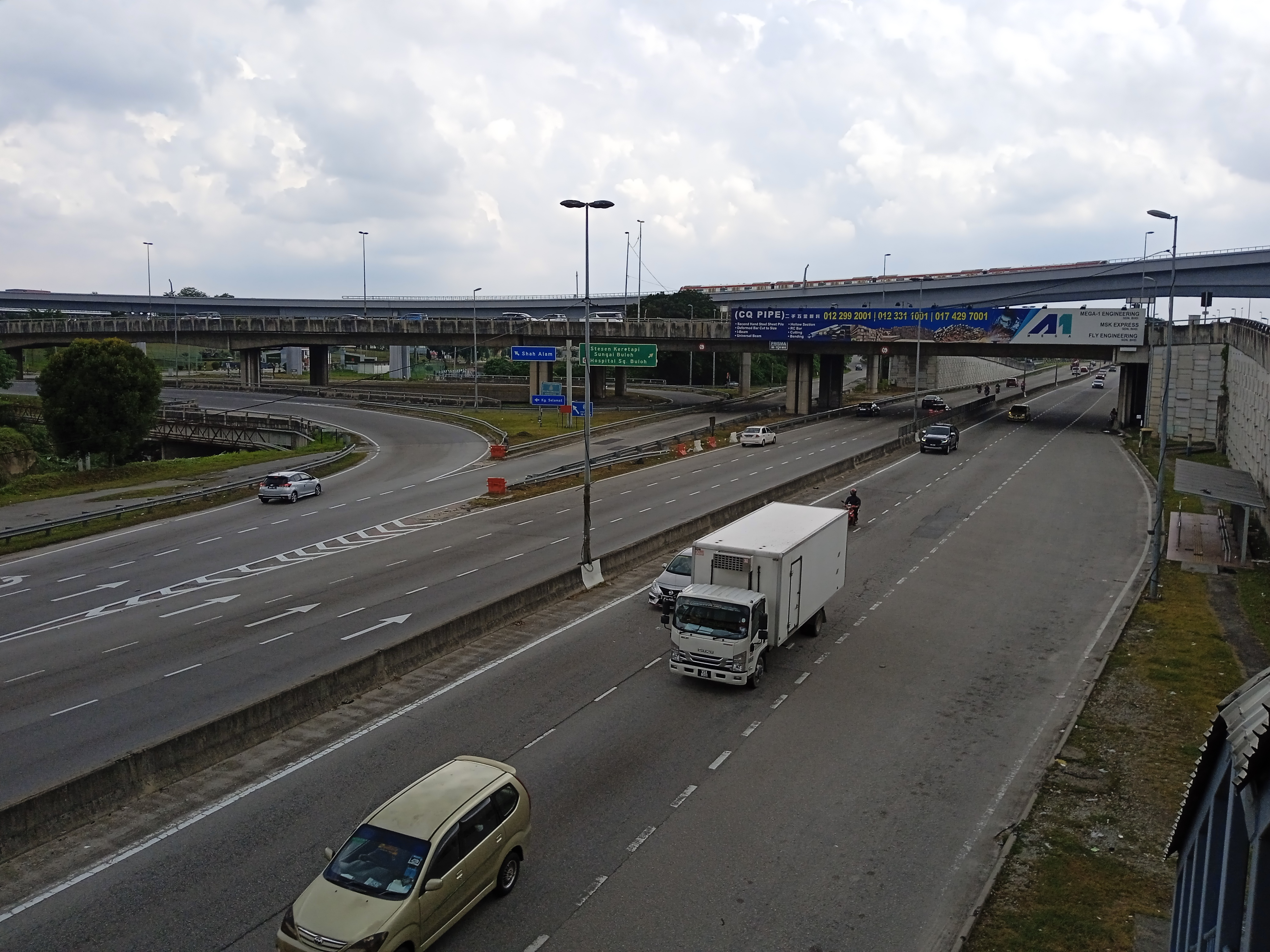
Jalan Sungai Buloh Interchange, interchange with Jalan Sungai Buloh (FT15/B9)
