= Bukit Rotan =

Coordinates: 3°18′N 101°19′E

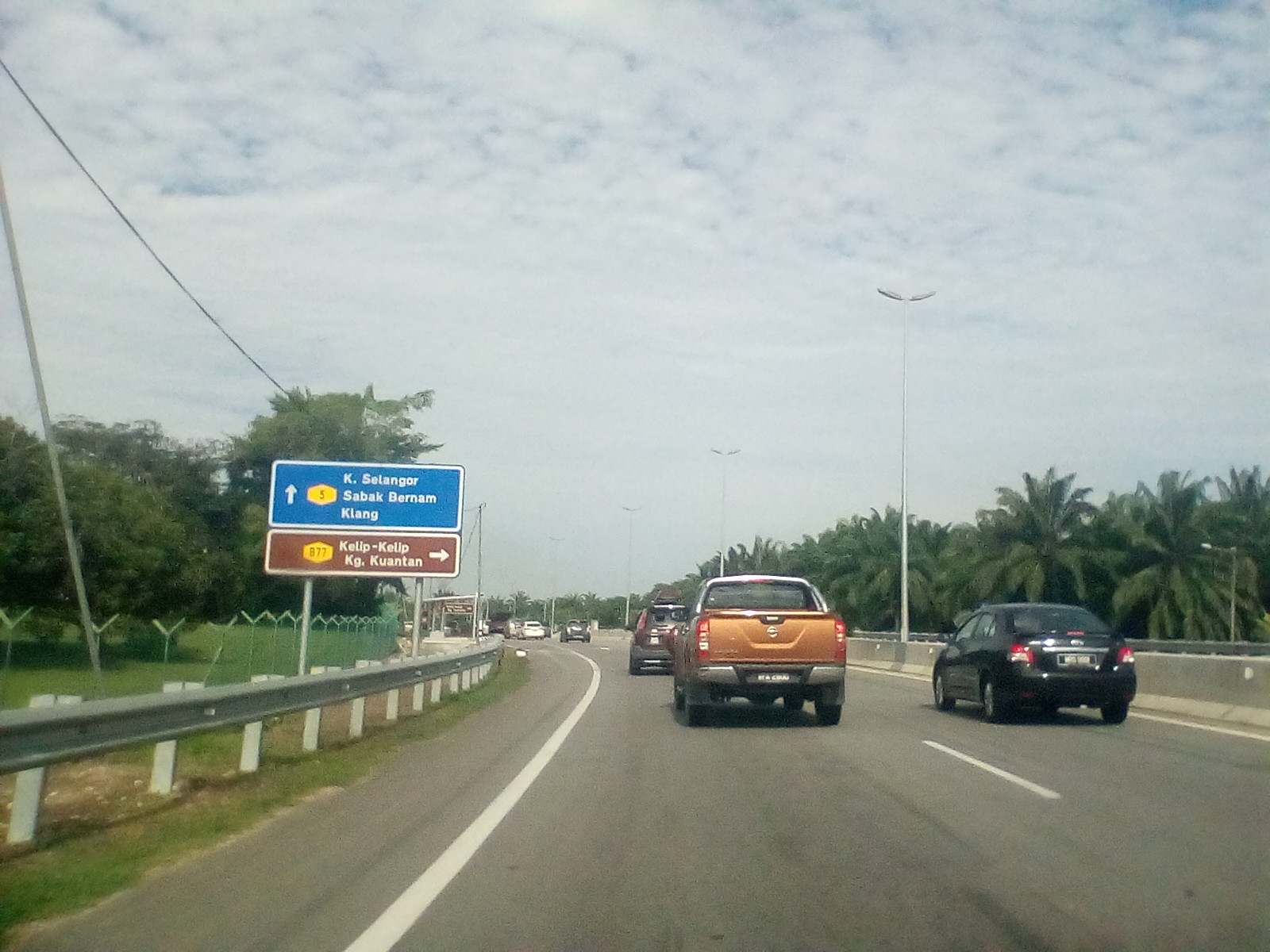
Jalan Kuala Selangor, part of Malaysia Federal Route 54 in Bukit Rotan

Bukit Rotan in Kuala Selangor District

Bukit Rotan is a small town in Kuala Selangor District, Selangor, Malaysia. The Kampung Kuantan's fireflies, a major tourist attraction is located here. It was a big area for plantation. They plant palm oil and there is a few company who runs the plantation as example, Sime darby
