= Selangor State Route B111 =

Road in Malaysia

Selangor Route 111
- Jalan Batu Arang

Major junctions
- North end: Jalan Rawang–Bestari Jaya
- B27 State Route B27; FT 54 Federal Route 54
- Southwest end: Jalan Kuala Selangor–Sungai Buloh

Location
- Country: Malaysia
- Primary destinations: Batu Arang

Highway system
- Highways in Malaysia; Expressways; Federal; State

Selangor State Route B111, Jalan Batu Arang is a major road in Selangor, Malaysia.

== Junction lists ==
The entire route is located in Gombak District, Selangor.

Legend:

- I/C - Interchange, I/S - Intersection, RSA - Rest and service area, OBR - Overhead bridge restaurant, R/R - Restaurant and rest plaza, L/B - Layby, V/P - Vista point, TN - tunnel, T/P - Toll plaza, BR - Bridge
- C - Cloverleaf, S - Stack, T-A - Trumpet-A, T-B - Trumpet-B, DT - Directional-T/Y, SDT - Semi-Directional-T/Y, P-Y - Partial-Y, D - Diamond, P-C - Partial cloverleaf, D-D - Diverging diamond, D-R - Direct ramp

Location	km	mi	Name	Destinations	Notes
Batu Arang			Jalan Rawang–Bestari Jaya	B27 Selangor State Route B27 – Kuala Selangor, Bestari Jaya (Batang Berjuntai), Rawang; North–South Expressway Northern Route / AH2 – Bukit Kayu Hitam, Ipoh, Kuala Lumpur	T-junctions
Batu Arang			Kampung Melayu Tambahan		
Batu Arang			Batu Arang	Jalan Lembah Hijau – Rawang, Puncak Alam; Kuala Lumpur–Kuala Selangor Expressway – Kuala Selangor, Shah Alam, Kuala Lumpur	T-junctions
Batu Arang			Jalan Kuala Selangor–Sungai Buloh	FT 54 Malaysia Federal Route 54 – Kuala Selangor, Ijok, Sungai Buloh, Shah Alam, Kuala Lumpur, Klang	T-junctions
1.000 mi = 1.609 km; 1.000 km = 0.621 mi
