= Kita Selangor Rail Line =

Rail line in Selangor & Negeri Sembilan

Overview
- Other name(s): Jajaran Rel Selangor; Selangor Rail Network
- Native name: Jajaran Rel Kita Selangor
- Status: Proposed
- Locale: Selangor; Negeri Sembilan
- Stations: 27 (planned)

Service
- Type: Commuter rail Rail freight transport
- Depot: Unknown

History
- Planned opening: Phase 1: 2036; Final Phase: 2060

Technical
- Line length: 211 km (131 mi)
- Track gauge: TBD
- Operating speed: 160 km/h

Kita Selangor Rail Line (Malay: Jajaran Rel Kita Selangor) is a proposed mixed-use rail network in the state of Selangor, Malaysia. The planned rail line aims to improve rail connectivity across the state, especially within the northern and western regions of Selangor, and to complement the existing rail transport network in Greater Kuala Lumpur. Construction is expected to be implemented in multiple phases over a ten-year span with construction of the first phase expected to commence in 2027. In August 2026, it was reported that the first phase of the line is expected to be completed in 2036 while the final phase would be completed by 2060.

== History ==
=== Proposal ===
The proposal for the line was first outlined as part of the state government's long-term transport strategy and included in the Selangor Pakatan Harapan's election manifesto before the 2023 Selangor state election. Early plans focused on providing a rail connection between Klang and northern Selangor districts such as Kuala Selangor and Sabak Bernam, areas which are not directly served by existing urban rail services.

During the tabling of the 2024 Selangor State Budget, the project was formally announced under the name Kita Selangor Rail, with RM3 million allocated to conduct a feasibility study.

=== Review ===
In July 2025, the project was reported to be in the feasibility study stage. Tentatively, the project is to be divided into two phases; with the first spanning from Labu in Negeri Sembilan to Puncak Alam, while the second phase from Puncak Alam to Sabak Bernam. The initial proposal had already been presented to the Ministry of Transport who welcomed the proposal.

Prasarana expressed its readiness to provide technical expertise for the project, citing its extensive experience in rail operations domestically and abroad.

== Overview ==
=== Route ===
According to the feasibility studies, the proposed rail line would have a total length of approximately 211 kilometres. The main alignment is planned to span Sabak Bernam in the northwest of Selangor, passing through Sepang, and extending southwards towards Negeri Sembilan. Several spur lines have been proposed to connect strategic locations including Westport, Klang, Putra Heights, and Universiti Selangor (UNISEL) in Bestari Jaya. The proposed rail line is expected to provide a direct connection to major industrial and transportation hubs such as the planned Selangor Aero Park, Kuala Lumpur International Airport (KLIA), Subang Airport, Port Klang and Carey Island.

The project is also intended to integrate with existing and future rail infrastructure, including a potential connection with the East Coast Rail Link (ECRL), to enhance inter-regional connectivity within Peninsular Malaysia.

=== Stations ===
According to the alignment map, 27 planned stations have been proposed across Selangor:

Station	District / Area	Notes / Interchanges
Sabak Bernam	Sabak	Northern terminus
Sungai Besar	Sungai Besar	
Sekinchan	Sekinchan	
Tanjung Karang	Tanjung Karang	
Kuala Selangor	Kuala Selangor	Main junction for the Bestari Jaya & UNISEL branch line
UNISEL	UNISEL, Bestari Jaya	Branch line terminus
Bestari Jaya	Bestari Jaya	Branch line
Ijok	Ijok	Branch line
Puncak Alam	Puncak Alam	Phase 1/2 boundary, Interchange with future ECR
Eco Grandeur	Eco Grandeur	
Elmina	Elmina	
Persiaran Atmosfera	Subang 2 / Denai Alam	
Kwasa	Kwasa Damansara	Interchange with 9 Kajang Line / 12 Putrajaya Line
Skypark	Subang Airport	Interchange with 10 Skypark Link
Ara Damansara	Ara Damansara	Interchange with 5 Kelana Jaya Line
Seksyen 17–18	Shah Alam	
Taman Sentosa	Klang	
Putra Heights	Putra Heights	Interchange with 4 Sri Petaling Line & 5 Kelana Jaya Line
Putra Perdana	Putra Perdana	Putra Heights branch line
Rimbayu	Rimbayu	Putra Heights branch line
Teluk Panglima Garang	Telok Panglima Garang	Main junction for the Putra Heights branch line
Jenjarom	Jenjarom	
Banting	Banting	
KLIA	KLIA	Interchange with 6 KLIA Ekspres / 7 KLIA Transit
Kargo KLIA	KLIA Cargo Terminal	Rail freight logistics hub
UPEN HSR	Labu, Negeri Sembilan	Interchange with future HSR
Seremban Sentral	Seremban	Southern Terminus, interchange with 1 Batu Caves–Pulau Sebang Line

=== Service ===
The Kita Selangor Rail Line is envisioned as a mixed-use rail line capable of carrying both passengers and freight. The trains are expected to significantly shorten travel times compared to road transport. State officials have indicated that the line could support logistics movements between ports, airports and industrial zones, in addition to daily commuter travel.

The trains are planned to reach up to 160 km/h, hence potentially shortening travel from northernmost end of the line Sabak Bernam to Kuala Lumpur International Airport (KLIA) from two hours and 41 minutes (by car) to one hour and 42 minutes (by rail).

== See also ==
- Transport in Selangor
- Rail transport in Malaysia
- East Coast Rail Link
