= Sungai Buloh Prison =

Prison complex in Selangor, Malaysia

Sungai Buloh Prison Penjara Sungai Buloh
- Interactive map of Sungai Buloh Prison; Penjara Sungai Buloh
- Location: Jalan Kuala Selangor-Sungai Buloh, 47000 Sungai Buloh, Gombak District, Selangor, Malaysia; 3.229841°N 101.493677°E
- Status: Operational
- Security class: High-security
- Opened: November 1996; 29 years ago
- Managed by: Malaysian Prison Department

Sungai Buloh Prison (Malay: Penjara Sungai Buloh; Chinese: 双溪毛糯监狱) is a prison complex in Sungai Buloh, Selangor, Malaysia. It is the 13th largest prison complex in Malaysia by area, with an area of 154.77 acres (62.63 ha). Also the largest prison complex in Malaysia by capacity. Its construction started in 1992 and ended in October 1996, and it was formally opened in November 1996 to replace Pudu Prison in Kuala Lumpur. The prison started its renovation on 22 July 2023, and is completed in early 2024.

== Famous inmates ==
- Anwar Ibrahim - a Malaysian politician who served sentences - for a corruption and two sodomy convictions - from 1998 to 2004, and 2015 to 2018.

== Renovation ==
Prime Minister Anwar Ibrahim ordered the renovation process of the Sungai Buloh Prison quarters to be expedited to ensure that it is completed by the end of 2023. He said for that purpose, The Chief Secretary of the Ministry of Interior has been asked to speed up the renovation process.

Renovation works started on 22 July 2023, and fully completed in early 2024.

The renovations works includes painting the quarters apartment blocks and the terrace quarters with brand new fresh colors, starting from Desa Mulia, Desa Murni, Desa Maju and beyond. Also, works on road resurfacing, adding airconds in the Tan Sri Dato' Ahmad Murad Hall and adding new play areas to the main playground.
