= Kuala Selangor =

Town in Selangor, Malaysia

- Town and district capital
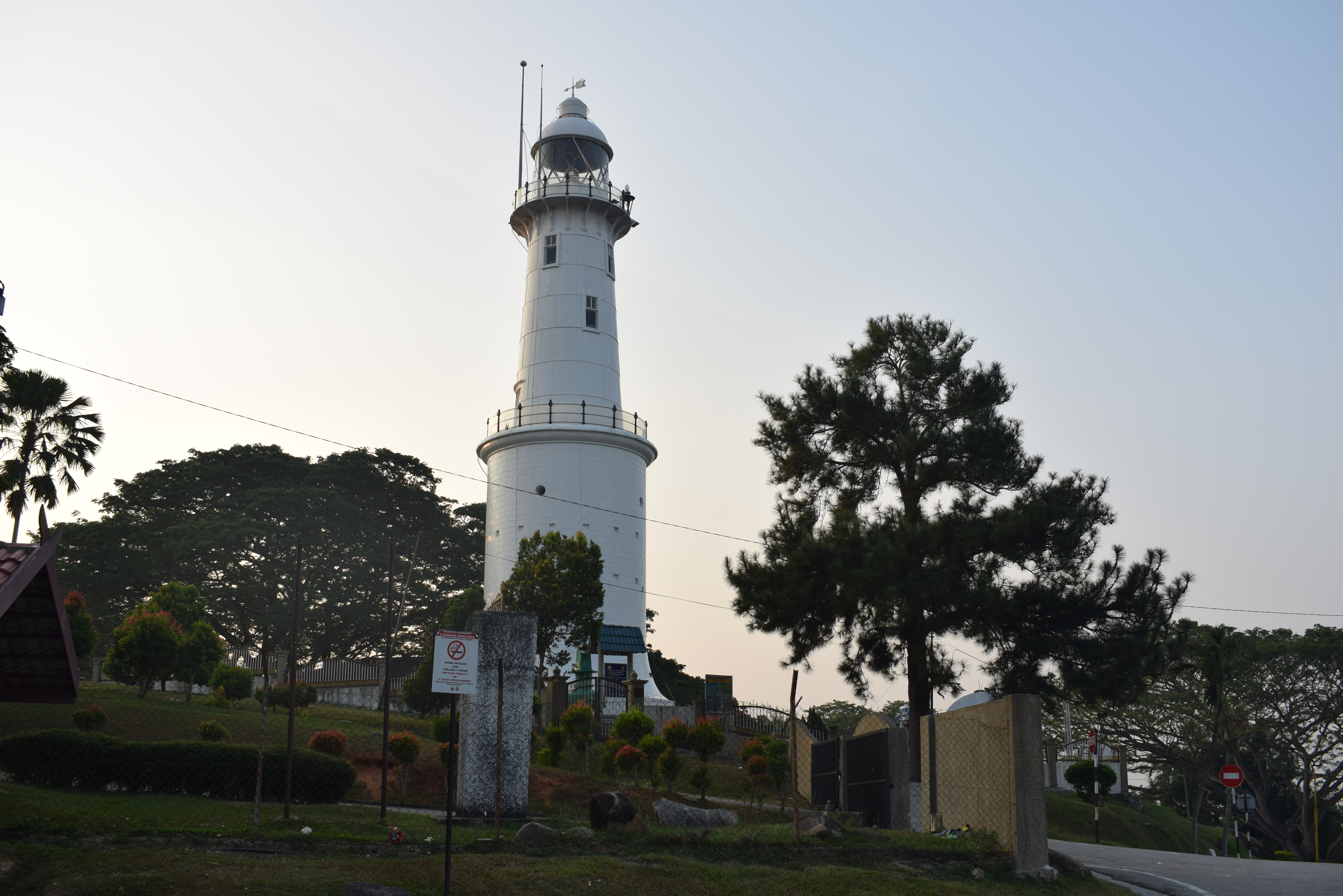
- Bukit Malawati Lighthouse, in the vicinity of Kuala Selangor
- Nicknames: Kuala Selangor, Beautiful and Historic
- Interactive map of Kuala Selangor
- Kuala Selangor in Selangor Kuala Selangor (Malaysia) Kuala Selangor (Southeast Asia)
- Coordinates: 3°19′59.52″N 101°15′15.12″E
- Country: Malaysia
- State: Selangor
- District: Kuala Selangor District
- Granted municipal status: 7 August 2021

Government
  - Type: Municipal council
  - Body: Kuala Selangor Municipal Council
  - Council President: Rahilah binti Rahmat
- Postal code: 45xxx
- Area code(s): 03-3xxxxxxx
- Vehicle registration: B
- Website: www.mpks.gov.my

Kuala Selangor Town in Kuala Selangor District

Kuala Selangor is a town in northwestern Selangor, Malaysia. It is the largest town and administrative centre of the coterminous Kuala Selangor District.

== Etymology ==
The name Kuala Selangor means estuary of the Selangor River.

== History ==
Prior to 18th century, it was ruled by the Malacca Sultanate. In the year 1784, the Dutch conquered Kuala Selangor which destroyed the fortifications. In the late 17th century however, it was invaded by the Bugis.

Then, Kuala Selangor was made the capital of the Sultanate of Selangor during the early years in the 18th century which was relocated 3 times.

== Location ==
Kuala Selangor town is located at the estuary of the Selangor River, where it drains into the Strait of Malacca. It is located 55 km north-west of downtown Kuala Lumpur, and 42 km north-west of Shah Alam, the capital of Selangor.

Kuala Selangor town is the largest town of the coterminous Kuala Selangor District, which also contains the adjacent towns of Tanjung Karang, Ijok, Puncak Alam, Bestari Jaya, and Jeram.

== Culture ==
The residents of Kuala Selangor are predominantly Malays, followed by Indians and ethnic Chinese. Most of the Chinese residents here are from the southern Fujian region, in which the Hokkien dialect is predominantly spoken by its ethnic Chinese residents.

== Tourist attractions ==
=== Bukit Melawati ===
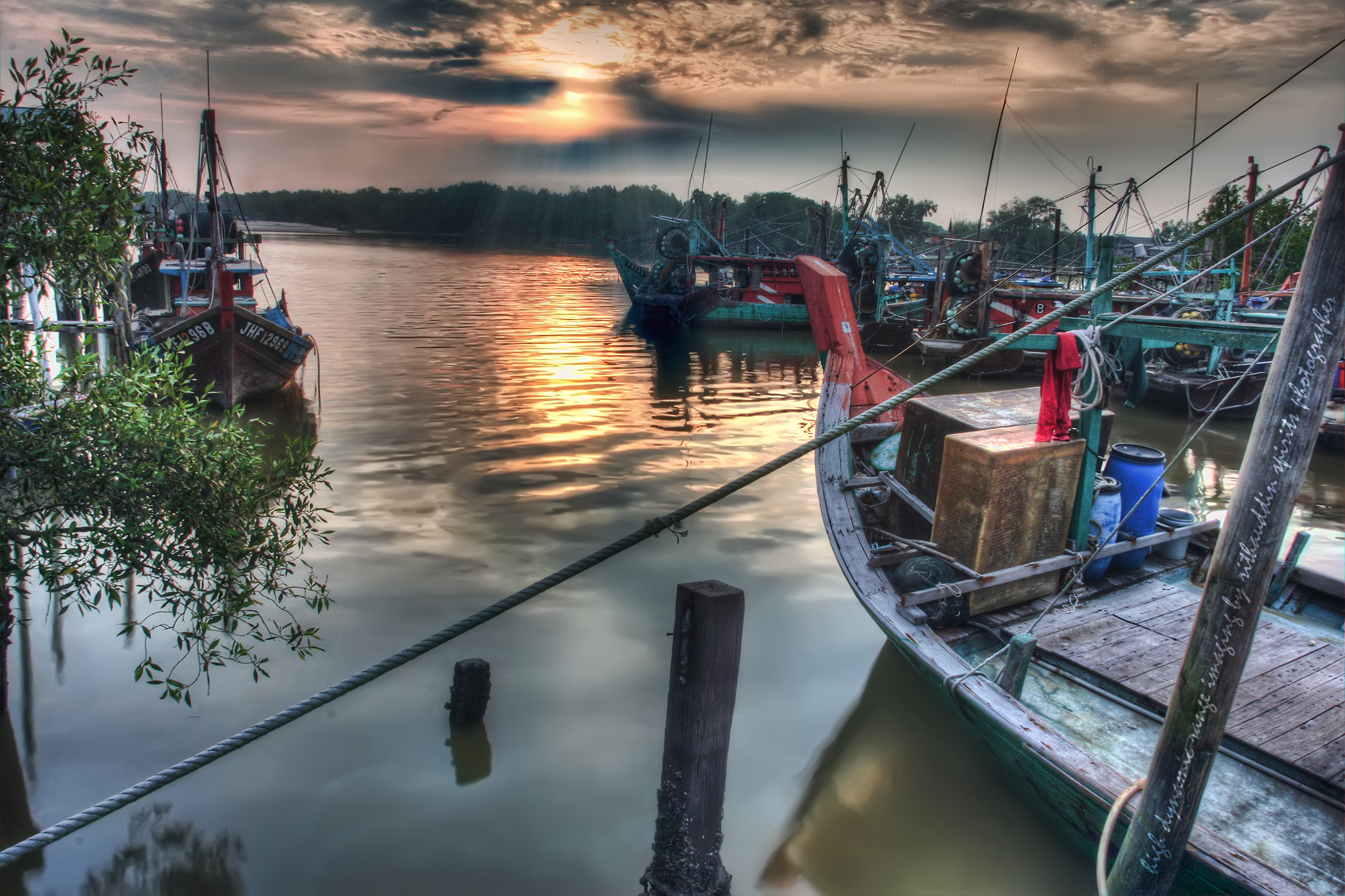
Bagan Pasir

=== Kampung Kuantan fireflies ===
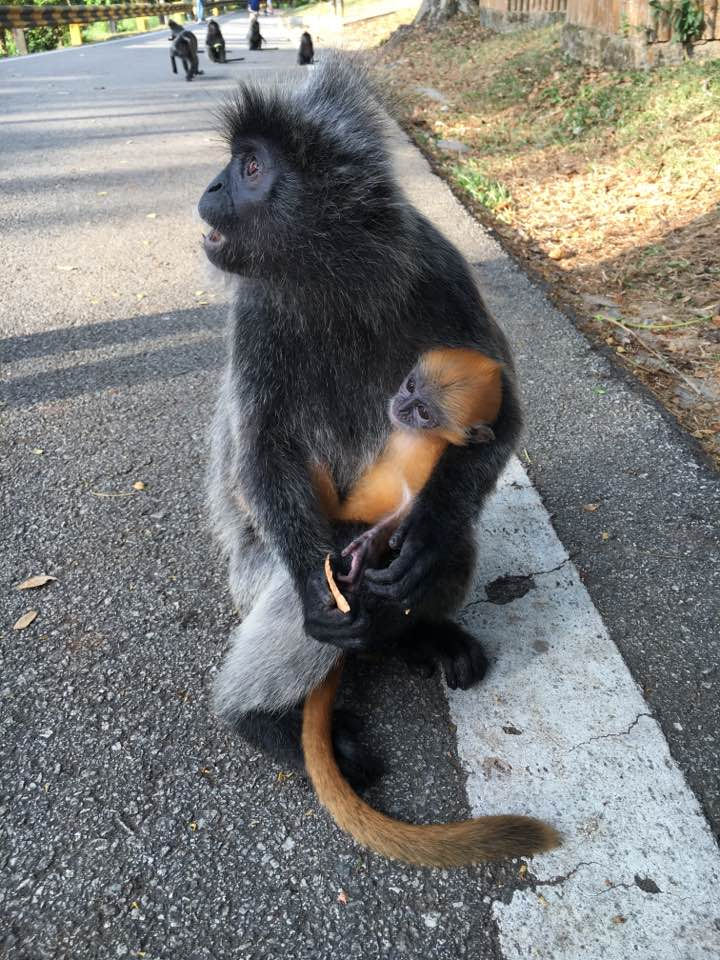
Silvery lutungs can be seen at Bukit Melawati

Kampung Kuantan is well known for its fireflies. Firely tourism in the area began in the early 1970s. Now, tourism is managed by the Kuala Selangor Municipal Council and has expanded rapidly with the addition of 27 small boats for the visitors.

=== Kuala Selangor Nature Park ===
Kuala Selangor Nature Park was opened in 1987. With an area of 296 hectares (2.96 km^{2}), it is divided to two main parts: a 201-hectare (2.01 km^{2}) Tropical Rainforest, and a Swamp Forest. The park is under the management of the Malaysia Nature Lovers Association, ensuring the natural environment of the park is preserved without any habitat damage.

== Transportation ==
=== Road ===
Kuala Selangor is connected to Sungai Buloh and Kepong by Federal Route 54. This is the main access road from downtown Kuala Lumpur. The Kuala Lumpur-Kuala Selangor expressway (LATAR) E25 is another access route, providing access from Rawang. The partially-completed West Coast Expressway, will provide access to Banting, Klang, Teluk Intan, Ipoh, and Taiping. It is scheduled to be completed by 2027.

Kuala Selangor is also accessible from the royal capital Klang via Federal Route 5.

=== Public transit ===
Bus terminal

==== Bus ====
Kuala Selangor serves as the terminus for a number of bus services. Terminal Bas Bandar Melawati Kuala Selangor serves as its bus terminal.

Code	Route	Operator
KS01	Kuala Selangor - Sekinchan	Wawasan Sutera (as part of MPKS SMART Selangor Bus)
100	Kuala Selangor - Medan Pasar	Selangor Omnibus
105	Kuala Selangor - Bestari Jaya	Wawasan Sutera
740	Kuala Selangor - Klang	Wawasan Sutera
ML34	Sungai Tengi - Tanjong Karang	MARAliner

==== Rail ====
Kuala Selangor is currently not connected to any rail transit lines. However, a branch line of the FMSR once connected Kuala Selangor to Padang Jawa; it was constructed in stages from 1913-1914 but was closed in 1933.

Since 2024, a new railway line passing through Kuala Selangor has been proposed to be built between Sabak Bernam extending southwards towards Negeri Sembilan, along with several other branch lines. It is expected to be completed in phases over 10 years once approved by the state government.

== In popular culture ==
=== Movies ===
- Mukhsin (2007)
- Ngangkung (2010)
