= Jeram =

Town in Selangor, Malaysia

Coordinates: 4°23′09.8″N 101°09′26.8″E

Jeram in Kuala Selangor District

Jeram is a town and mukim in Kuala Selangor District, Selangor, Malaysia.

It is about halfway between Kapar and Kuala Selangor, on Highway 5.
