= Kuala Lumpur–Kuala Selangor Expressway =

Expressway in Malaysia

Expressway 25
- Kuala Lumpur–Kuala Selangor Expressway (LATAR Expressway)
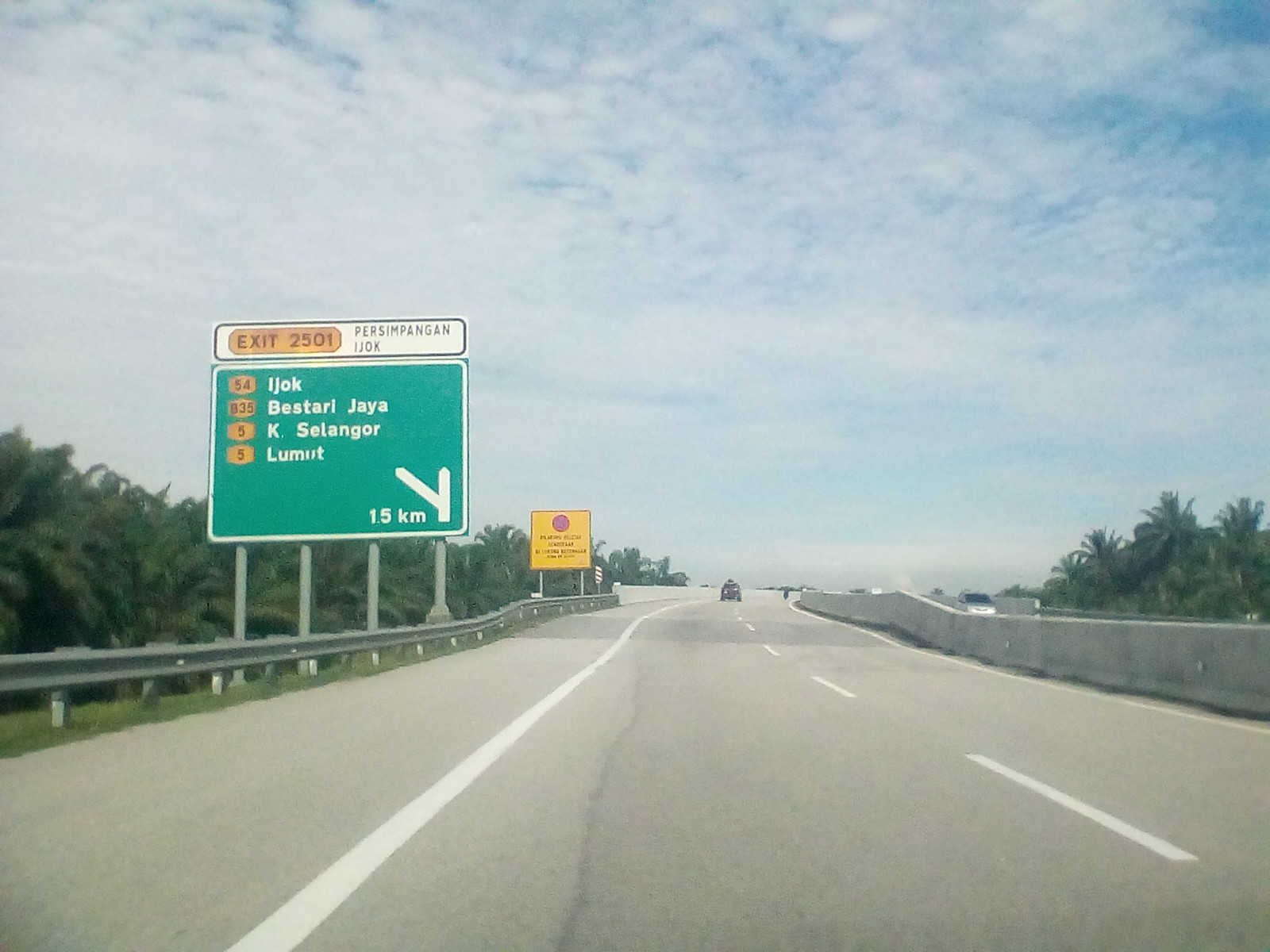
- Ijok Interchange signboard marker. Ijok Interchange is the western terminus of LATAR, and it will be connected to the WCE expressway, which is still undergoing construction works.

Route information
- Maintained by LATAR; KL-Kuala Selangor Expressway Berhad (KLS)
- Length: 32 km (20 mi)
- Existed: 2008–present
- History: Completion on 2011

Major junctions
- West end: Ijok
- FT 54 Federal Route 54; West Coast Expressway; Guthrie Corridor Expressway; East Klang Valley Expressway; FT 1 Kuala Lumpur–Rawang Highway
- East end: Templer's Park

Location
- Country: Malaysia
- Primary destinations: Kuala Selangor, Ijok, Puncak Alam, Kuang, Rawang

Highway system
- Highways in Malaysia; Expressways; Federal; State

The E25 Kuala Lumpur–Kuala Selangor Expressway (Malay: Lebuhraya Kuala Lumpur–Kuala Selangor; Chinese: 吉隆坡–瓜拉雪兰莪大道), KLS (formerly Ijok–Templer Park Highway (Malay: Lebuhraya Ijok–Taman Templer; Chinese: 依约–邓普勒公园大道), LATAR) or sometimes called LATAR Expressway (Malay: Lebuhraya LATAR), is an expressway in Selangor, Malaysia. It is part of the Kuala Lumpur Outer Ring Road. The 32 km (20 mi) expressway connects Ijok near Kuala Selangor to Templer's Park near Rawang and not Kuala Lumpur as its name suggests – consequently, motorists will need to travel another 20 km to Kuala Lumpur via Kuala Lumpur–Rawang Highway. Kuala Lumpur–Kuala Selangor Expressway is the fourth east–west-oriented expressway in the Klang Valley after the Federal Highway, the New Klang Valley Expressway (NKVE) and the Shah Alam Expressway.

== Route background ==
The Kilometre Zero of the expressway is located at Ijok.

== History ==
Previously, the Federal Route 54 was the only gateway to Kuala Selangor, with a typical journey of 1 hours. The Kuala Lumpur–Kuala Selangor Expressway project was awarded to Bina Puri Holdings Berhad for contract amounting to MYR 958 million. The turnkey contractor for this project was Mudajaya Corporation Berhad. The construction is divided into two packages, package 1 of the proposed design-and-build contract is from Ijok to Kundang, while package 2 is from Kundang to Templer's Park. Construction work was started in the third quarter 2008 and was completed in the middle of 2011. The expressway was opened to traffic on 23 June 2011.

== Features ==
- Many oil palm estates along this expressway.
- 2 Lane Dual Carriageway
- 5 Interchanges
- 4 Toll Plazas (Kundang West and Kundang East on Kundang interchange have 2 toll plazas)
- Rest & Service Areas
- Aesthetically Designed Bridges (Viaducts) in different locations such as Ijok and Yew Hock Estate viaducts
- Templer's Park Interchange in the eastern end of expressway is a most scenic views.

== Toll systems ==
The Kuala Lumpur–Kuala Selangor Expressway using opened toll systems. There are 6 toll plazas along Kuala Lumpur–Kuala Selangor Expressway. Each toll plaza is located around 4–6 km away.

=== Electronic Toll Collections (ETC) ===
As part of an initiative to facilitate faster transaction at the Ijok, Kuang East, Kuang West, Kundang East, Kundang West and Taman Rimba Templer Toll Plazas, all toll transactions at six toll plazas on the Kuala Lumpur–Kuala Selangor Expressway have been conducting electronically via Touch 'n Go cards or SmartTAGs starting 2 March 2016.

=== Toll rates ===
(Starting 15 October 2015)

Class	Types of vehicles	Rate (in Malaysian Ringgit (RM))			
Class	Types of vehicles	Kundang (Both directions)	Ijok	Kuang (Both directions)	Taman Rimba Templer
0	Motorcycles (Vehicles with two axles and two wheels)	Free			
1	Private Cars (Vehicles with two axles and three or four wheels (excluding taxi and bus))	1.30	2.50		
2	Vans and other small good vehicles (Vehicles with two axles and five or six wheels (excluding bus))	2.60	5.00		
3	Large Trucks (Vehicles with three or more axles (excluding bus))	3.90	7.50		
4	Taxis	0.70	1.30		
5	Buses	1.30	2.00		

== Interchange lists ==
The speed limit for the entire expressway is 110 km/h except at Ijok, Kuang East, Kuang West, and Taman Rimba Templer toll plazas where the speed limit is 60 km/h. The entire route is located in Selangor.

Legend:

- I/C - Interchange, I/S - Intersection, RSA - Rest and service area, OBR - Overhead bridge restaurant, R/R - Restaurant and rest plaza, L/B - Layby, V/P - Vista point, TN - tunnel, T/P - Toll plaza, BR - Bridge
- C - Cloverleaf, S - Stack, T-A - Trumpet-A, T-B - Trumpet-B, DT - Directional-T/Y, SDT - Semi-Directional-T/Y, P-Y - Partial-Y, D - Diamond, P-C - Partial cloverleaf, D-D - Diverging diamond, D-R - Direct ramp

District	Location	km	mi	Exit	Name	Destinations	Notes
Kuala Selangor	Ijok			3210	Assam Jawa I/C	West Coast Expressway – Ipoh, Lumut, Teluk Intan, Sabak Bernam, Banting	Trumpet interchange
Kuala Selangor	Ijok			Assam Jawa Toll Plaza			
Kuala Selangor	Ijok	0.0	0.0	2501	Ijok I/C	FT 54 Malaysia Federal Route 54 – Assam Jawa, Kuala Selangor, Ijok, Bestari Jaya (Batang Berjuntai)	
Kuala Selangor	Ijok			Ijok viaduct Sungai Buloh bridge			
Kuala Selangor	Ijok	3.8	2.4	Ijok Toll Plaza			
Kuala Selangor	Puncak Alam	6.8	4.2	2502	Eco Grandeur I/C	Eco Grandeur, Alam Jaya, Alam Perdana	
Kuala Selangor	Puncak Alam			Yew Hock Estate viaduct			
Kuala Selangor	Puncak Alam	11.6	7.2	2503	Puncak Alam I/C	FT 54 Jalan Kuala Selangor – Puncak Alam, Kota Puteri, Kuang, Sungai Buloh	
Kuala Selangor	Puncak Alam	12.7	7.9	2504	Bandar Tasik Puteri I/C	Jalan Tasik Puteri – Bandar Tasik Puteri, Bandar Country Homes, Batu Arang, Bestari Jaya (Batang Berjuntai)	
Gombak	Kundang	13.5	8.4	Kuang (West) Toll Plaza (westbound only)			
Gombak	Kundang	16.7	10.4	2505	Kundang (West) I/C	B149 Jalan Kundang – Bandar Country Homes, Kundang, Kuang, Lagong	Eastbound exit and westbound entrance only
Gombak	Kundang	16.7	10.4	Kundang RSA (Both directions; separated)			
Gombak	Kundang	18.5	11.5	2505	Kundang (East) I/C	B149 Jalan Kundang – Bandar Country Homes, Kundang, Kuang, Lagong	Westbound exit and eastbound entrance only
Gombak	Kundang			Sungai Kundang bridge			
Gombak	Kundang	19.6	12.2	Kuang (East) Toll Plaza (eastbound only)			
Gombak	Kundang			Pipeline crossing bridge			
Gombak	Kundang	20.8– 22.0	12.9– 13.7	2506	Kuang I/C	North–South Expressway Northern Route / AH2 – Kuala Lumpur (via Jalan Duta), Ipoh, Rawang, Sungai Buloh; Guthrie Corridor Expressway – Shah Alam, Subang, Paya Jaras	
Gombak	Templer Park			Railway crossing bridge			
Gombak	Templer Park	26.8	16.7	Taman Rimba Templer Toll Plaza			
Gombak	Templer Park	30.0	18.6	2508	Templer Park I/C	FT 1 Kuala Lumpur–Rawang Highway – Rawang, Serendah, Selayang, Batu Caves, Kuala Lumpur, Kuantan	
1.000 mi = 1.609 km; 1.000 km = 0.621 mi: Electronic toll collection

== Gallery ==
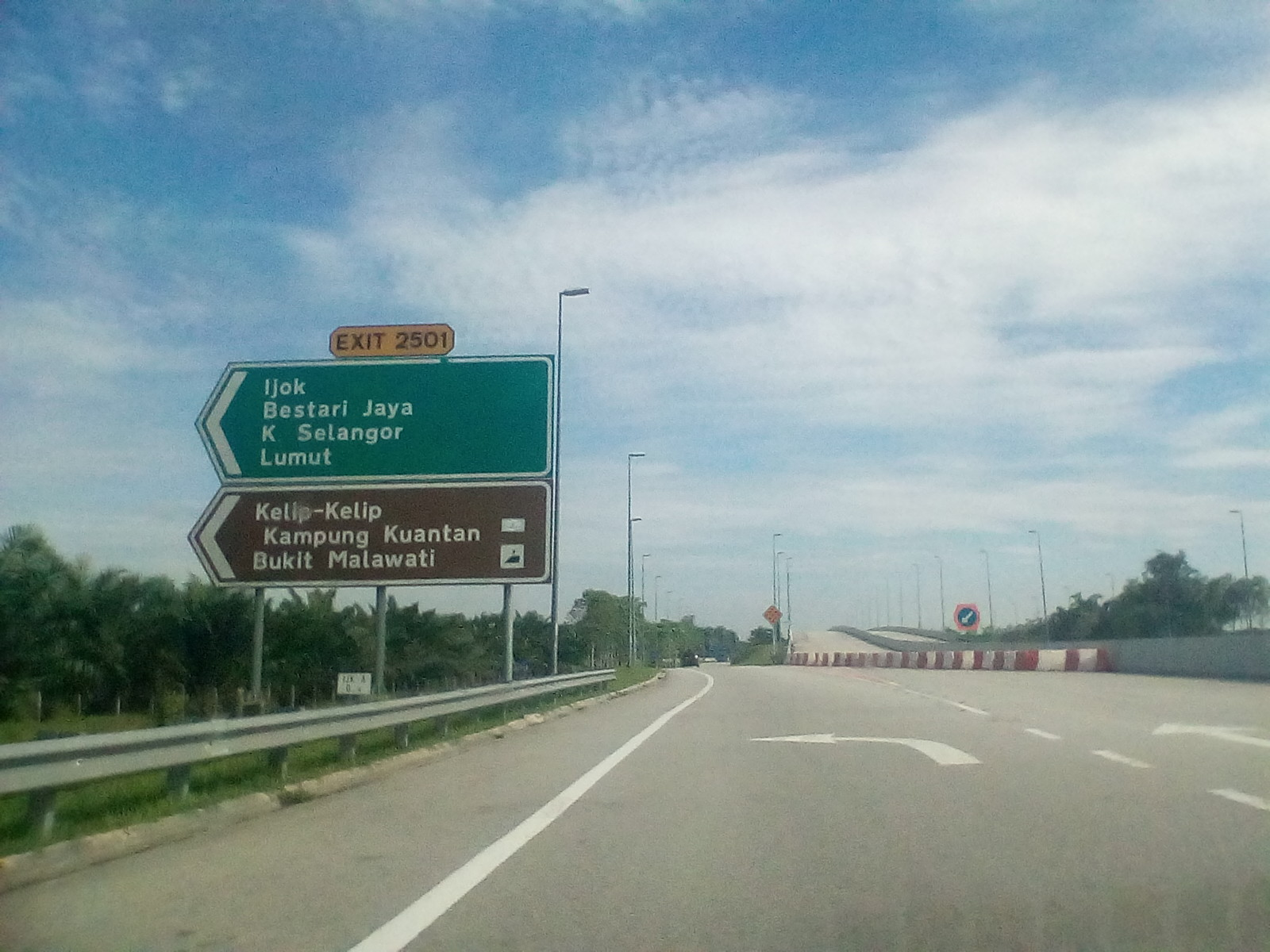
Ijok Interchange

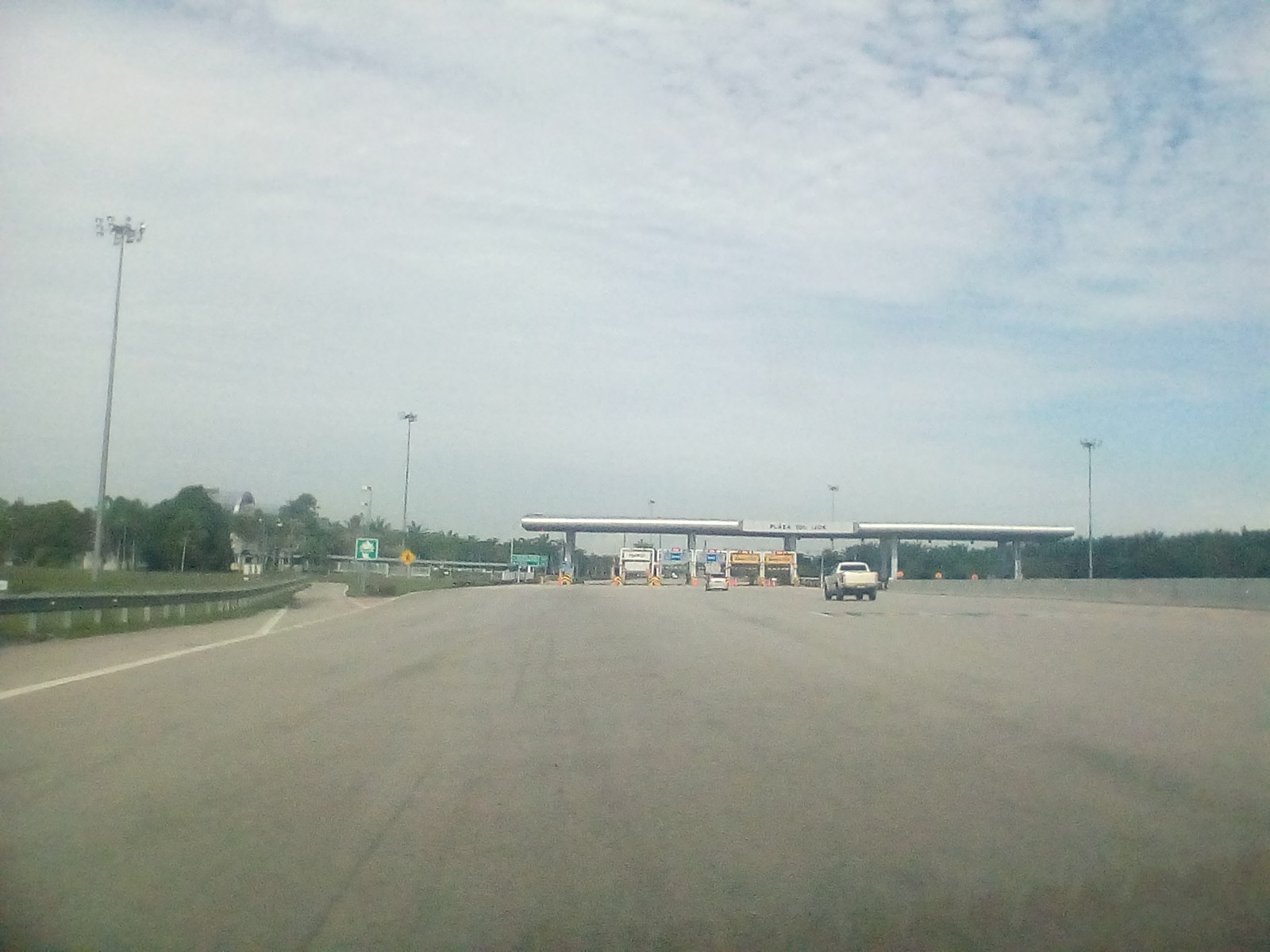
Ijok Toll Plaza

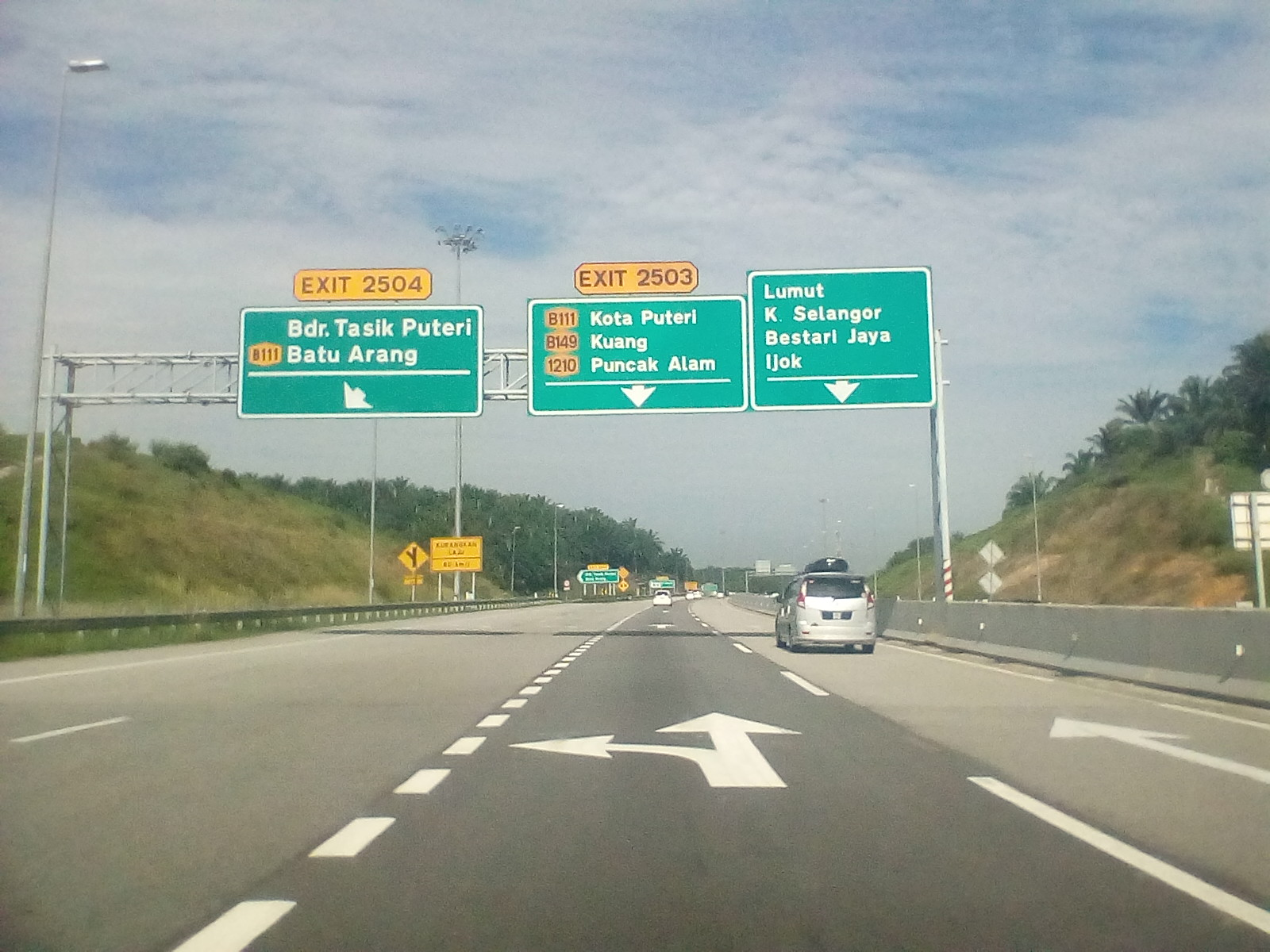
Puncak Alam and Bandar Tasik Puteri Interchange

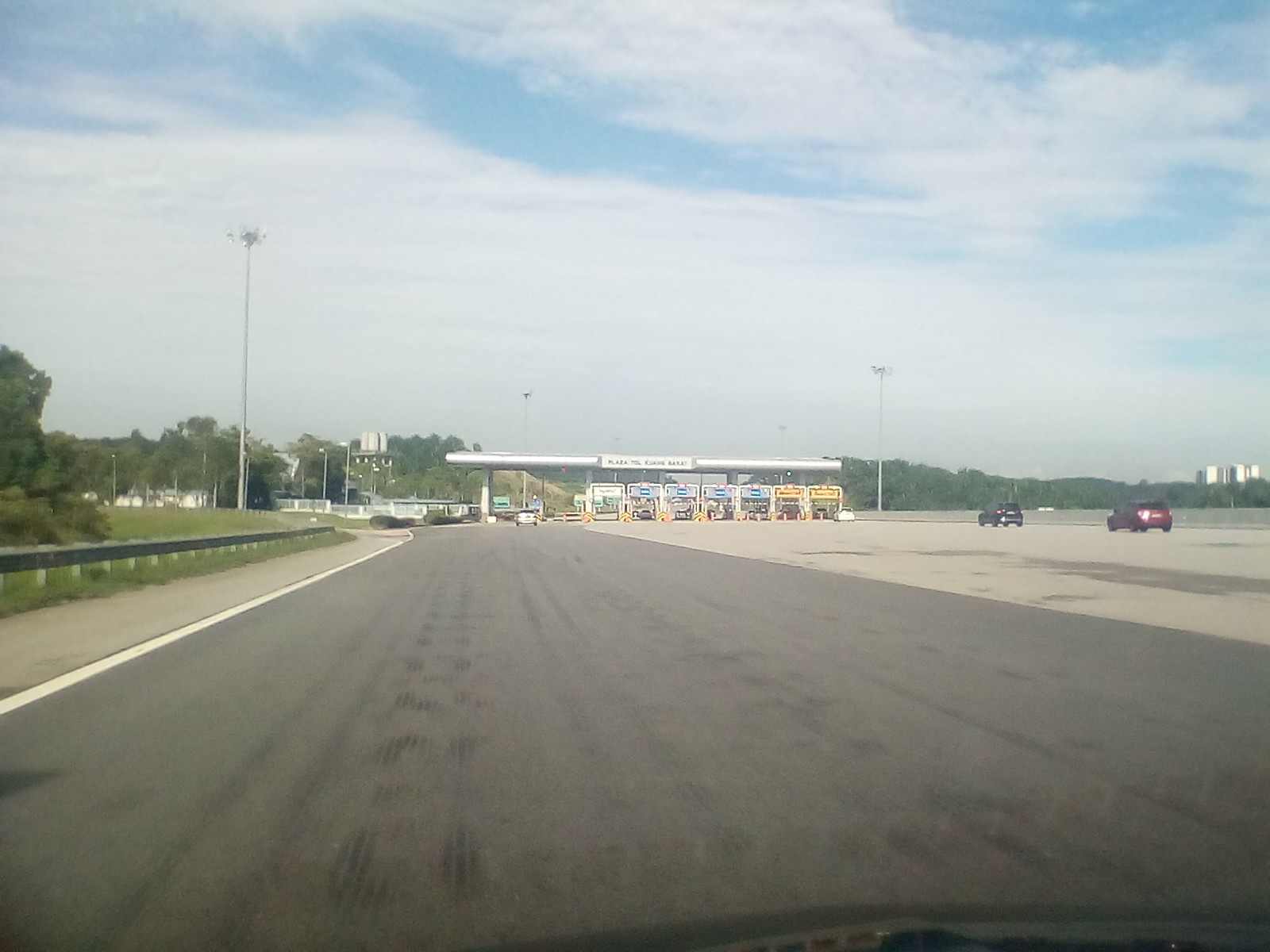
Kuang West Toll Plaza

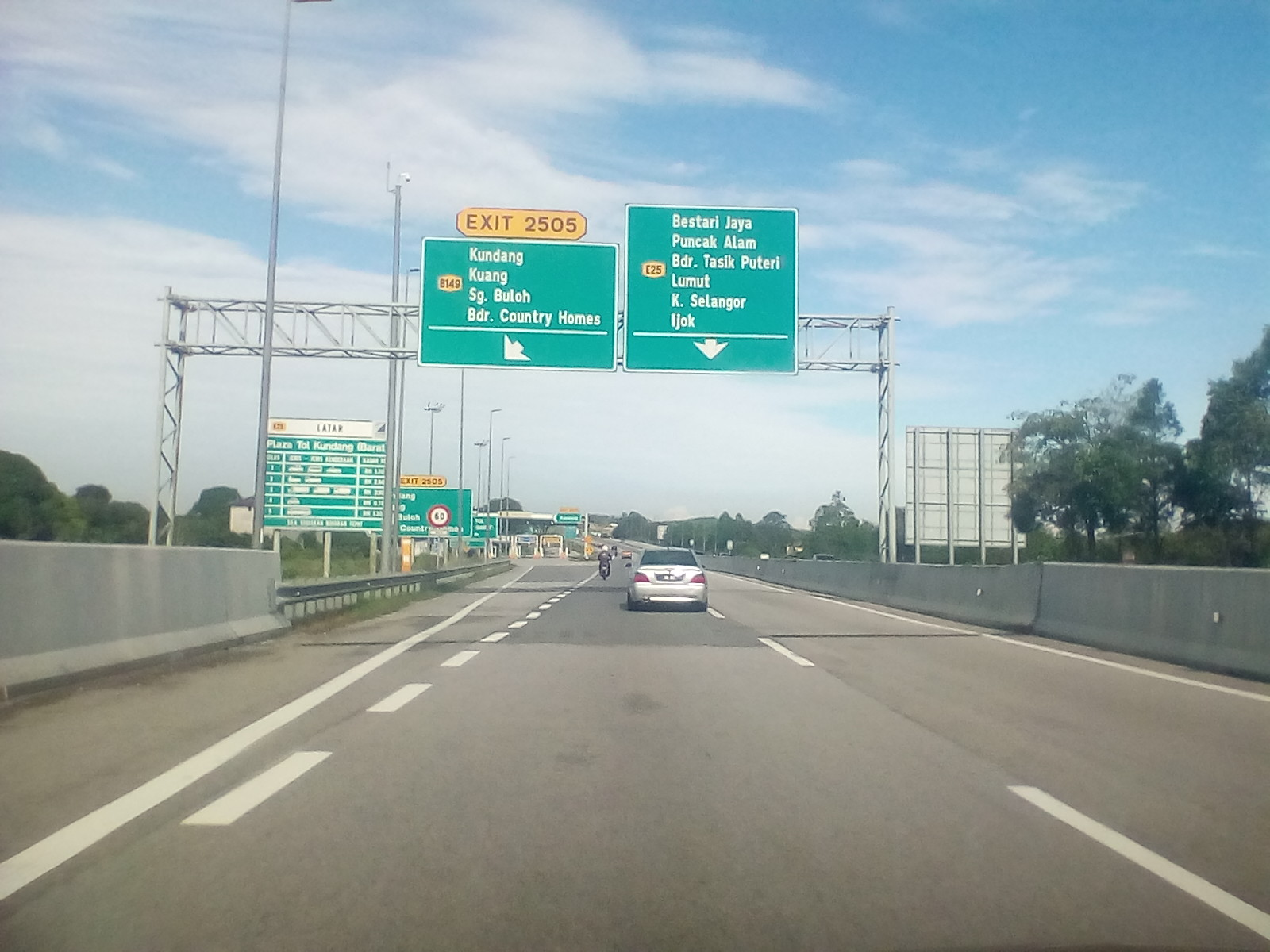
Kundang (East) Interchange
