= Kuala Selangor District =

District in Selangor, Malaysia

- District of Selangor
- Daerah Kuala Selangor
- Flag Seal
- Interactive map of Kuala Selangor District
- Location of Kuala Selangor District in Malaysia
- Coordinates: 3°24′N 101°20′E
- Country: Malaysia
- State: Selangor
- Granted Municipal Status: 7 August 2021
- Seat: Kuala Selangor

Government
  - Type: Municipal council
  - Body: Kuala Selangor Municipal Council
  - District officer: Shamsul Shahril Badliza Noor
  - Sultan's Representative: Yaacob Ismail
  - President: Mohamad Hanafe Bin Basri

Area
  - Total: 1,194.52 km^{2} (461.21 sq mi)

Population (2021)
  - Total: 273,728
  - Density: 229.153/km^{2} (593.504/sq mi)
- Time zone: UTC+8 (MST)
  - Summer (DST): UTC+8 (Not observed)
- Postcode: 45xxx
- Calling code: +6-03
- Vehicle registration plates: B

The Kuala Selangor District is a district in Selangor, Malaysia. It has a total landmass of 1,194.52 square kilometres (461 sq mi) separated by Selangor River into two division, Tanjung Karang and Kuala Selangor. The district boundary is shared with Sabak Bernam at the north, Hulu Selangor and Gombak at the west, Petaling at the southwest and Klang at the south.

== Geography ==
The geography of Kuala Selangor is characterised by a flat land in Tanjung Karang and Jeram. Bordered in Kapar in South and some hills at Southeast. The district's name was from a town that named when Selangor River meets the sea.

== Administrative divisions ==

Kuala Selangor District is divided into 9 mukims, which are:

- Api-Api
- Bestari Jaya
- Ujong Permatang
- Hulu Tinggi
- Ijok
- Jeram
- Kuala Selangor
- Pasangan
- Tanjung Karang

== Demographics ==
Historical population
Year	Pop.	±%
1991	123,052	—
2000	161,168	+31.0%
2010	205,257	+27.4%
2020	281,753	+37.3%

== Federal Parliament and State Assembly Seats ==
Kuala Selangor, Selangor Parliament and State Assembly Electoral Districts

List of Kuala Selangor district representatives in the Federal Parliament (Dewan Rakyat)

Parliament	Seat Name	Member of Parliament	Party
P95	Tanjong Karang	Zulkafperi Hanapi	Perikatan Nasional (BERSATU)
P96	Kuala Selangor	Dzulkefly Ahmad	Pakatan Harapan (AMANAH)
P107	Sungai Buloh	Ramanan Ramakrishnan	Pakatan Harapan (PKR)

List of Kuala Selangor district representatives in the State Legislative Assembly (Dewan Undangan Negeri)

Parliament	State	Seat Name	State Assemblyman	Party
P95	N8	Sungai Burong	Mohammad Zamri Mohamad Zainuddin	Perikatan Nasional (PAS)
P95	N9	Permatang	Nurul Syazwani Noh	Perikatan Nasional (BERSATU)
P96	N10	Bukit Melawati	Noorazley Yahya	Perikatan National (BERSATU)
P96	N11	Ijok	Jefri Mejan	Perikatan Nasional (PAS)
P96	N12	Jeram	Harrison Hassan	Perikatan Nasional (BERSATU)
P107	N38	Paya Jaras	Abdul Halim Tamuri	Perikatan Nasional (PAS)

The Kuala Selangor District Council is seeking for the area to become declared as a municipality.

== Transportation ==
=== Road construction ===
Currently there is an expressway named Kuala Lumpur–Kuala Selangor Expressway E25 (LATAR) linked Ijok, Kuala Selangor and Templer Park, Rawang. It is also connected with Guthrie Corridor Expressway (GCE) to Shah Alam and North–South Expressway Central Link to northern Peninsular Malaysia. Another expressway which is under construction named West Coast Expressway (WCE) in Tanjung Karang only have small amount of them which only provided in the township of Tanjung Karang and some sub-roads in some villages. The town is usually accessed via Klang–Teluk Intan Road FT5 (coastal route), Kuala Selangor–Kepong Road FT54 (to Kuala Lumpur) and Kuala Selangor–Bestari Jaya Road B33 (to Bestari Jaya & Rawang).

=== Public Transport ===
There are 6 bus lines by Selangor Omnibus, Wawasan Sutera and rapidKL bus currently serving the Kuala Selangor District which is:

- 100 (Kuala Selangor to Kuala Lumpur via Ijok)
- 105 (Kuala Selangor to Bestari Jaya)
- 107 (Bestari Jaya to Kuala Lumpur via Ijok)
- 740 (Kuala Selangor to Klang)
- 753 (Shah Alam to UiTM Puncak Alam via Klang)
- T715 (UiTM Puncak Alam to Puncak Alam)
- T155 (Bandar Tasik Puteri to Sungai Buloh station via Jalan Kuala Selangor Malaysia Federal Route 54)

Two free bus services provided by MDKS (Kuala Selangor District Council) are available:

- KS01 (Kuala Selangor to Sekinchan via Tanjong Karang)
- KS02 (Puncak Alam to Sungai Buloh railway station)

Taxi services and Grab Car also available in the Kuala Selangor town.

The Local Planning Masterplan for the year 2015 released by MDKS envision the addition of a Light Rail Transit facility (linking Bestari Jaya, Puncak Alam and Shah Alam) in the future.

== See also ==
- Districts of Malaysia
