= Puncak Alam =

- Township

Other transcription(s)
  - Malay: ڤونچق عالم
  - Chinese: 本查阿南
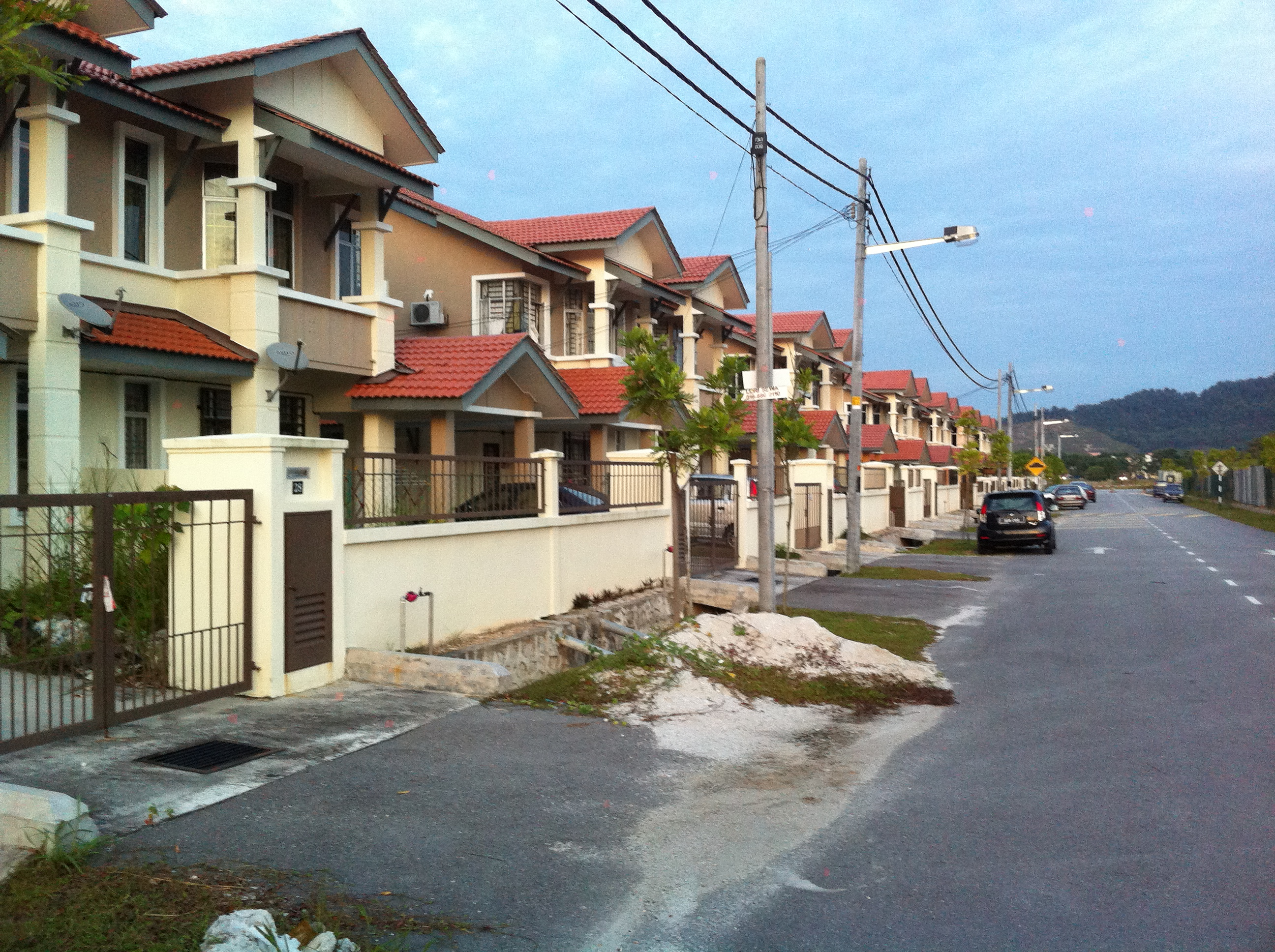
- Coordinates: 3.222125°N 101.436274°E
- Country: Malaysia
- State: Selangor
- District: Kuala Selangor

Government
  - Local government: Kuala Selangor Municipal Council
- Time zone: UTC+8 (MST)
  - Summer (DST): Not observed
- Postal code: 42300
- Website: mpks.gov.my

Puncak Alam is a city in Kuala Selangor district, Malaysia. It is located within 20 kilometers to the northwest from the city of Shah Alam, the capital of the state of Selangor.

Previously developed from a palm estate holding of FELDA within the locale of Bukit Cherakah, this township started its initial development during the late 1990s under the management of Bukit Cherakah Development Sdn. Bhd., a private company based in Shah Alam. Puncak Alam Housing Sdn. Bhd. later took over in 2001 as the principal developer of this township. There are 3 phases in the township, Phase 1 in the southern part (Section 1-6 but only Section 2 is existing), Phase 2 in the middle (Seksyen 7-9), Phase 3 in the north (Seksyen 12-13) and the Alam Suria at the northwest, which also known as Shah Alam 2.

First launched with an estimated total area of 14,000 acres (57 km^{2}) for the whole township, subsequent development sees the actual land parcel being apportioned and jointly developed with third-party developers, resulting in the emergence of sub-townships within the vicinity under new names and concepts (such as Alam Perdana, Alam Jaya, Sinar Alam, Ambang Suria, Alam Suria, Eco Grandeur, LBS Alam Perdana, Hillpark), whilst the initially earmarked land area for Puncak Alam being significantly reduced in size.

== Future development ==
A development plan dated 9 September 2008 released by Kuala Selangor Municipal Council (MPKS), the local authority responsible for the administration of the Kuala Selangor district, among others, disclosed that future expansion for this township would include the completion of a Universiti Teknologi MARA (UiTM) by the year 2014, on an area demarcated of 1,085.75 acres (4.3939 km^{2}), comprising 15 faculties capable of supporting 41,000 students and staffs. The same report projected that 65,798 additional units of houses/residences would be completed by the year 2015, capable of accommodating 350,000 population as compared to the current reported population of 25,000.

The latest Local Planning Masterplan for the year 2015 released by MPKS envision the addition of a water theme park and also a Light Rail Transit facility (linking Bestari Jaya, Puncak Alam and Shah Alam).

Amenities:

- Walking distance to Econsave and Alam Jaya Commercial Center shop lot
- 7.7 km to UiTM Puncak Alam
- 4 km to Masjid Puncak Alam
- 2.8 km to Puncak Alam National School, Petrol Station
- 2.5 km to McDonald's, Lotus's Puncak Alam
- 17 km to Setia Alam

High-rise projects:

- LBS Melodi Perdana
- LBS Irina by Myra

== Access ==
=== Car ===
Puncak Alam is served by the Kepong-Kuala Selangor highway Federal Route 54 and Damansara-Shah Alam Elevated Expressway (DASH).

=== Public transport ===
Puncak Alam is devoid of any rail transit services. The closest rail station is in KA09 Kuang, 12 kilometres away.

Bus services:

- rapidKL bus T715 (formerly T600) connects Puncak Alam to the UiTM campus in the township.
- The UiTM campus also serves as a major bus interchange, with rapidKL bus route 753 (formerly U90) going to Setia Alam and Klang before terminating at the Shah Alam bus terminal in Section 14, downtown Shah Alam.
- Since 2018, there is a new Smart Selangor bus route KS02 connecting Puncak Alam to KA08 PY04 Sungai Buloh MRT/KTM station. This route is a free service subsidized by the Selangor state government.
