= Selangor State Route B25 =

Road in Malaysia

Selangor Route 25
- Jalan Kuang 轰埠路

Major junctions
- North end: Rawang
- FT 3209 Federal Route 3209; B29 Jalan Lagong; B149 Jalan Kundang; FT 54 Federal Route 54
- South end: Sungai Pelong

Location
- Country: Malaysia
- Primary destinations: Kuang, Kundang, Paya Jaras, Batu Arang, Bestari Jaya

Highway system
- Highways in Malaysia; Expressways; Federal; State

Selangor State Route B25, Jalan Kuang (Chinese: 轰埠路) is a major road in Selangor, Malaysia.

"Kuang" means "Pheasant" in Malay.

== History ==
Start from 3 December 2018, The Sime Darby Property closed the State Route B25 sections between Jalan Ciku and Kampung Bunga Raya permanently due to the road surface collapsing, including 6.5 km (4.0 mi) sections owned by private property, until the development of Lagong in 2026. The road surfaces for Rawang–Kuang direction are collapsed about 7 ft (2.1 m), leading to only one lane is available for two directions.

The Rawang state assemblyman Chua Wei Kiat appropriated RM20,000 to repair a bridge leading to the Rawang KRI Industrial Area that had developed cracks and subsidence. The Federal Route 3209–Jalan Ciku sections become the B25 first sections to repair, as the Jalan Ciku is the only road to Rawang KRI Industrial Area.

== Features ==
=== Alternative routes ===
- B29 Jalan Lagong – Alternative road to Lagong and Kundang due to the B25 closure

== Junction lists ==
The entire route is located in Selangor.

Legend:

- I/C - Interchange, I/S - Intersection, RSA - Rest and service area, OBR - Overhead bridge restaurant, R/R - Restaurant and rest plaza, L/B - Layby, V/P - Vista point, TN - tunnel, T/P - Toll plaza, BR - Bridge
- C - Cloverleaf, S - Stack, T-A - Trumpet-A, T-B - Trumpet-B, DT - Directional-T/Y, SDT - Semi-Directional-T/Y, P-Y - Partial-Y, D - Diamond, P-C - Partial cloverleaf, D-D - Diverging diamond, D-R - Direct ramp

District	Location	km	mi	Name	Destinations	Notes
Gombak	Rawang			Rawang	FT 3209 / B27 Malaysia Federal Route 3209 – Bestari Jaya, Batu Arang, Rawang, Batang Kali, Ipoh, Genting Highlands, Kuala Lumpur; North–South Expressway Northern Route / AH2 – Bukit Kayu Hitam, Ipoh, Kuala Lumpur, Klang	T-junctions
Gombak	Rawang			Railway crossing		
Gombak	Kuang			Jalan Ciku–Kuang; Closed		
Gombak	Kuang			Kuang	P&R Kuang Komuter station	
Gombak	Kuang			Jalan Lagong	B29 Jalan Lagong – Lagong, Kundang, Bestari Jaya	T-junctions
Gombak	Kuang			Kampung Batu Dua Puloh		
Gombak	Kuang			Jalan Kundang	B149 Jalan Kundang – Kundang, Kundang Lake, Bandar Tasik Puteri, Batu Arang; Jalan Melati – Bukit Rahman Putra, Sungai Buloh	T-junctions
Gombak	Kuang			BBQ Land and Steamboat Buffet Restaurant		
Gombak–Petaling district border				Sungai Pelong bridge		
Petaling	Sungai Pelong			Sungai Pelong	FT 54 Malaysia Federal Route 54 – Kuala Selangor, Ijok, Paya Jaras, Petaling Jaya, Sungai Buloh, Kuala Lumpur; Guthrie Corridor Expressway – Rawang, Shah Alam; North–South Expressway Northern Route / AH2 – Bukit Kayu Hitam, Ipoh, Kuala Lumpur, Klang	T-junctions
1.000 mi = 1.609 km; 1.000 km = 0.621 mi: Closed/former
