= Selangor State Route B27 =

Road in Malaysia

Selangor Route 27
- Jalan Rawang–Bestari Jaya

Major junctions
- West end: Bestari Jaya (Batang Berjuntai)
- B33 State Route B33; B35 State Route B35; B42 State Route B42; B111 State Route B111; B29 State Route B29; North–South Expressway Northern Route / AH2; B25 State Route B25; FT 1 Kuala Lumpur–Rawang Highway
- East end: Rawang

Location
- Country: Malaysia
- Primary destinations: Ijok, Batu Arang, Bandar Country Homes, Kuang

Highway system
- Highways in Malaysia; Expressways; Federal; State

Selangor state route B27, Jalan Rawang–Bestari Jaya is a major road in Selangor, Malaysia. It connects Rawang in the east to Bestari Jaya (formerly Batang Berjuntai) in the west. It is also a main route to North–South Expressway Northern Route via Rawang Interchange. The 3.1-km section of this road, which is known as Jalan Kawasan Perindustrian Rawang (from Rawang to Rawang Interchange), is also commissioned as Industrial Federal Route 3209.

== History ==
=== Road upgrading ===
The RM250mil Jalan Rawang-Batu Arang (B27 road) expansion is under way and will take about three years to complete.

Once completed, motorists headed to Bandar Tasik Puteri from the NSE Rawang toll should have a smoother drive.

The 4.6 km road project will be undertaken by the state, assisted by the Public Works Department (JKR) and developers.

A total of 19 developers in the area are contributing to the B27 Road Fund, which is expected to cost RM250mil.

Phase One will stretch for 1.6 km from near the NSE Rawang toll to the Petronas station.

Phase Two of the project, which will be done by developers, will involve building a bridge from the Petronas station to near the Shell station.

For Phase Three from the Shell station to near the Bandar Tasik Puteri junction of 2.3 km, land acquisition is being carried out by the Gombak Land office.

== Junction lists ==
The entire route is located in Selangor.

Legend:

- I/C - Interchange, I/S - Intersection, RSA - Rest and service area, OBR - Overhead bridge restaurant, R/R - Restaurant and rest plaza, L/B - Layby, V/P - Vista point, TN - tunnel, T/P - Toll plaza, BR - Bridge
- C - Cloverleaf, S - Stack, T-A - Trumpet-A, T-B - Trumpet-B, DT - Directional-T/Y, SDT - Semi-Directional-T/Y, P-Y - Partial-Y, D - Diamond, P-C - Partial cloverleaf, D-D - Diverging diamond, D-R - Direct ramp

District	Location	km	mi	Name	Destinations	Notes
Kuala Selangor	Bestari Jaya			Bestari Jaya (Batang Berjuntai)	B33 Selangor State Route B33 – Kuala Selangor; B35 Selangor State Route B35 – Ijok, Sungai Buloh, Kuala Lumpur	T-junctions
Kuala Selangor	Bestari Jaya			Bestari Jaya (Batang Berjuntai)	B42 Selangor State Route B42 – Sungai Tinggi, Bukit Tagar, Sungai Tengi, FELDA Soeharto, University of Selangor (UNISEL)	T-junctions
Gombak	Batu Arang			Selangor Tropical Fruits Valley	Selangor Tropical Fruits Valley	T-junctions
Gombak	Batu Arang			Batu Arang	B111 Jalan Batu Arang – Batu Arang	T-junctions
Gombak	Batu Arang			Jalan Tasik Puteri	Kuala Lumpur–Kuala Selangor Expressway – Kuala Selangor, Klang, Kuala Lumpur, Rawang, Shah Alam; Jalan Tasik Puteri – Bandar Tasik Puteri	T-junctions
Gombak	Batu Arang			Jalan Lagong	Guthrie Corridor Expressway – Rawang, Ipoh, Kuala Lumpur; B29 Jalan Lagong – Kundang, Kundang Lake, Gamuda Gardens, Lagong, Kuang	T-junctions
Gombak	Batu Arang			Jalan Sungai Bakau	Jalan Sungai Bakau – Saujana Rawang	T-junctions
Gombak	Batu Arang			Jalan Desa Utama	Jalan Desa Utama – Bandar Country Homes	T-junctions
Gombak	Rawang			Rawang-NSE	North–South Expressway Northern Route / AH2 – Bukit Kayu Hitam, Ipoh, Sungai Buaya, Sungai Buloh, Petaling Jaya, Kuala Lumpur, Shah Alam, Klang	T-junctions
Gombak	Rawang			Rawang Interchange–Rawang	see also FT 3209 Malaysia Federal Route 3209	
1.000 mi = 1.609 km; 1.000 km = 0.621 mi: Concurrency terminus
