= Selangor State Route B29 =

Road in Malaysia

Selangor Route 29
- Jalan Lagong 拉贡路

Major junctions
- North end: Batu Arang
- B27 State Route B27; B149 State Route B149; Guthrie Corridor Expressway; B25 State Route B25
- Southeast end: Kuang

Location
- Country: Malaysia
- Primary destinations: Kundang, Bandar Gamuda Gardens, Kampung Sungai Serai, Lagong

Highway system
- Highways in Malaysia; Expressways; Federal; State

Selangor State Route B29, Jalan Lagong (Chinese: 拉贡路) is a major road in Selangor, Malaysia.

== Junction lists ==
The entire route is located in Gombak District, Selangor.

Legend:

- I/C - Interchange, I/S - Intersection, RSA - Rest and service area, OBR - Overhead bridge restaurant, R/R - Restaurant and rest plaza, L/B - Layby, V/P - Vista point, TN - tunnel, T/P - Toll plaza, BR - Bridge
- C - Cloverleaf, S - Stack, T-A - Trumpet-A, T-B - Trumpet-B, DT - Directional-T/Y, SDT - Semi-Directional-T/Y, P-Y - Partial-Y, D - Diamond, P-C - Partial cloverleaf, D-D - Diverging diamond, D-R - Direct ramp

Location	km	mi	Name	Destinations	Notes
Batu Arang			Batu Arang	B27 Selangor State Route B27 – Kuala Selangor, Bestari Jaya, Rawang	T-junctions
Kundang			Kundang	B149 Selangor State Route B149 – Kundang, Kuang, Tasik Biru	T-junctions
Kundang			Kundang Jaya		
Lagong			Bandar Gamuda Gardens	Persiaran Gamuda Gardens 1 – Bandar Gamuda Gardens	T-junctions
Lagong			Kampung Sungai Serai	Jalan Kampung Sungai Serai – Kampung Sungai Serai	T-junctions
Kuang			Kuang-GCE	Guthrie Corridor Expressway – Kuala Lumpur, Ipoh	Entrance to northbound only
Kuang			Kuang	B25 Selangor State Route B25 – Rawang, Sungai Buloh	Junctions
1.000 mi = 1.609 km; 1.000 km = 0.621 mi: Incomplete access
