= Malaysia Federal Route 3209 =

Road in Malaysia

Federal Route 3209
- Jalan Kawasan Perindustrian Rawang

Route information
- Maintained by Malaysian Public Works Department
- Length: 3.1 km (1.9 mi)

Major junctions
- West end: Rawang Interchange
- North–South Expressway Northern Route / AH2; FT 1 Kuala Lumpur–Rawang Highway
- East end: Rawang

Location
- Country: Malaysia
- Primary destinations: Ijok, Batu Arang, Bandar Country Homes, Kuang

Highway system
- Highways in Malaysia; Expressways; Federal; State

Federal Route 3209, Jalan Kawasan Perindustrian Rawang is an industrial federal roads in Selangor, Malaysia. This 3.1-km industrial federal road connects Rawang Interchange in the west to Rawang in the east.

The Kilometre Zero is located at Rawang, at its interchange with the Federal Route 1, the main trunk road of the central of Peninsular Malaysia.

At most sections, the Federal Route 3209 was built under the JKR R5 road standard, allowing maximum speed limit of up to 90 km/h (56 mph).

There is one overlap: B27 Selangor State Route B27 (from Rawang town centre to Bestari Jaya).

== Junction lists ==
The entire route is located in Gombak District, Selangor.

Legend:

- I/C - Interchange, I/S - Intersection, RSA - Rest and service area, OBR - Overhead bridge restaurant, R/R - Restaurant and rest plaza, L/B - Layby, V/P - Vista point, TN - tunnel, T/P - Toll plaza, BR - Bridge
- C - Cloverleaf, S - Stack, T-A - Trumpet-A, T-B - Trumpet-B, DT - Directional-T/Y, SDT - Semi-Directional-T/Y, P-Y - Partial-Y, D - Diamond, P-C - Partial cloverleaf, D-D - Diverging diamond, D-R - Direct ramp

| Location | km | mi | Name | Destinations | Notes |
|---|---|---|---|---|---|
| Rawang | 3.1 | 1.9 | Bestari Jaya–Rawang Interchange | see also B27 Selangor State Route B27 | |
| Rawang | | | Rawang-NSE | North–South Expressway Northern Route / AH2 – Bukit Kayu Hitam, Ipoh, Sungai Buaya, Sungai Buloh, Petaling Jaya, Kuala Lumpur, Shah Alam, Klang | T-junctions |
| Rawang | | | Rawang Industrial Area | Rawang Industrial Area | T-junctions |
| Rawang | | | Jalan Kuang | B25 Selangor State Route B25 – Kuang, Sungai Buloh | T-junctions |
| Rawang | | | Jalan Kuala Garing | Jalan Kuala Garing – Kampung Kuala Garing, Taman Sri Rawang | T-junctions |
| Rawang | | | Rawang river bridge | | |
| Rawang | | | Rawang | | |
| Rawang | | | Railway crossing bridge | | |
| Rawang | 0.0 | 0.0 | Rawang | FT 1 Kuala Lumpur–Rawang Highway – Rawang town centre, Batang Kali, Ipoh, Genting Highlands, Selayang, Batu Caves, Kuala Lumpur | Diamond interchange |
1.000 mi = 1.609 km; 1.000 km = 0.621 mi: Closed/former; Concurrency terminus; Electronic toll collection
