= Selangor State Route B33 =

Road in Malaysia

Selangor Route 33
- Jalan Kuala Selangor–Bestari Jaya / Jalan Rawang
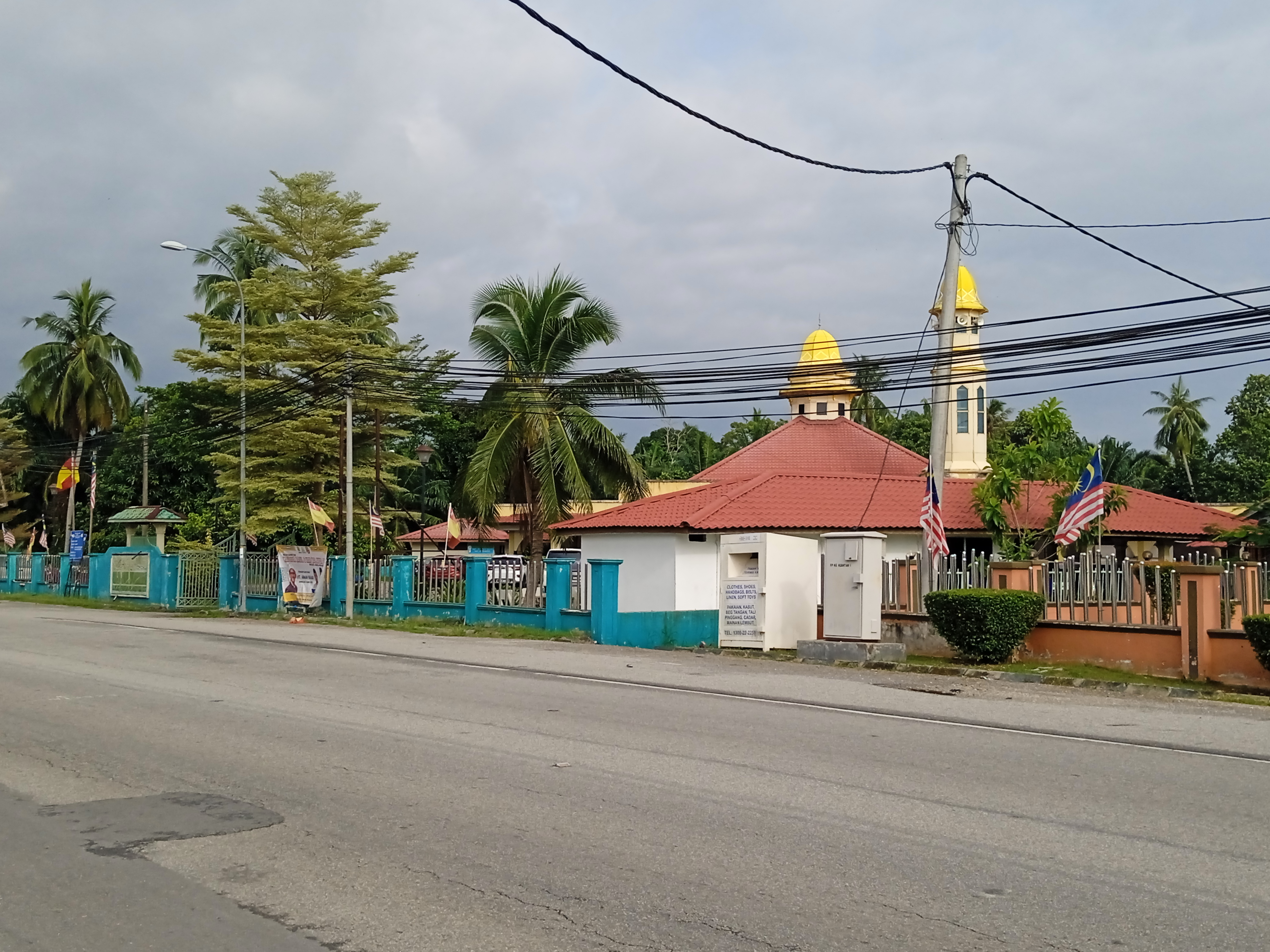
- State Route B33 at Kampung Kuantan

Major junctions
- West end: Kuala Selangor
- FT 5 Federal Route 5 B77 State Route B77; B35 State Route B35; B27 State Route B27
- East end: Bestari Jaya (Batang Berjuntai)

Location
- Country: Malaysia
- Primary destinations: Kampung Kuantan, Bukit Badong, Ijok, Batu Arang, Rawang, Sungai Tinggi

Highway system
- Highways in Malaysia; Expressways; Federal; State

Selangor State Route B33, Jalan Kuala Selangor–Bestari Jaya or Jalan Rawang on Kuala Selangor side is a major road in Selangor, Malaysia.

The State Route B33 was suggested to build a new interchange to West Coast Expressway for more accessibility, since the West Coast Expressway has only two interchange in Kuala Selangor District.

== Features ==
- Kampung Kuantan

== Junction lists ==
The entire route is located in Kuala Selangor District, Selangor.

| Location | km | mi | Name | Destinations | Notes |
|---|---|---|---|---|---|
| Kuala Selangor | | | Kuala Selangor | FT 5 Malaysia Federal Route 5 – Kuala Selangor, Tanjung Karang, Sabak Bernam, Teluk Intan, Jeram, Kapar, Klang | T-junctions |
| Kuala Selangor | | | Taman Bentara | | |
| Kuala Selangor | | | Kampung Teluk Penyamun | | |
| Kuala Selangor | | | Kampung Kuantan | Kampung Kuantan Fireflies; B77 Selangor State Route B77 – Bukit Rotan | Junctions |
| Kuala Selangor | | | Kampung Teluk Siam Baharu | | |
| Kuala Selangor | | | Bukit Rotan Estate | | |
| Kuala Selangor | | | Taman Desa Utama | | |
| Kuala Selangor | | | Kampung Asahan | | |
| Kuala Selangor | | | Ijok Estate | | |
| Bestari Jaya | | | Taman Kilauan Tun Sambanthan | | |
| Bestari Jaya | | | Taman Sinaran | | |
| Bestari Jaya | | | Kampung Holowood | | |
| Bestari Jaya | | | Bestari Jaya (Batang Berjuntai) | B35 Selangor State Route B35 – Ijok, Sungai Buloh, Kuala Lumpur; B27 Selangor State Route B27 – Batu Arang, Rawang; North–South Expressway Northern Route / AH2 – Bukit Kayu Hitam, Ipoh, Kuala Lumpur, Klang | T-junctions |
1.000 mi = 1.609 km; 1.000 km = 0.621 mi
