= Kuang Komuter station =

Railway station in Gombak, Selangor, Malaysia

Coordinates: 3°15′29″N 101°33′18″E

Kuang

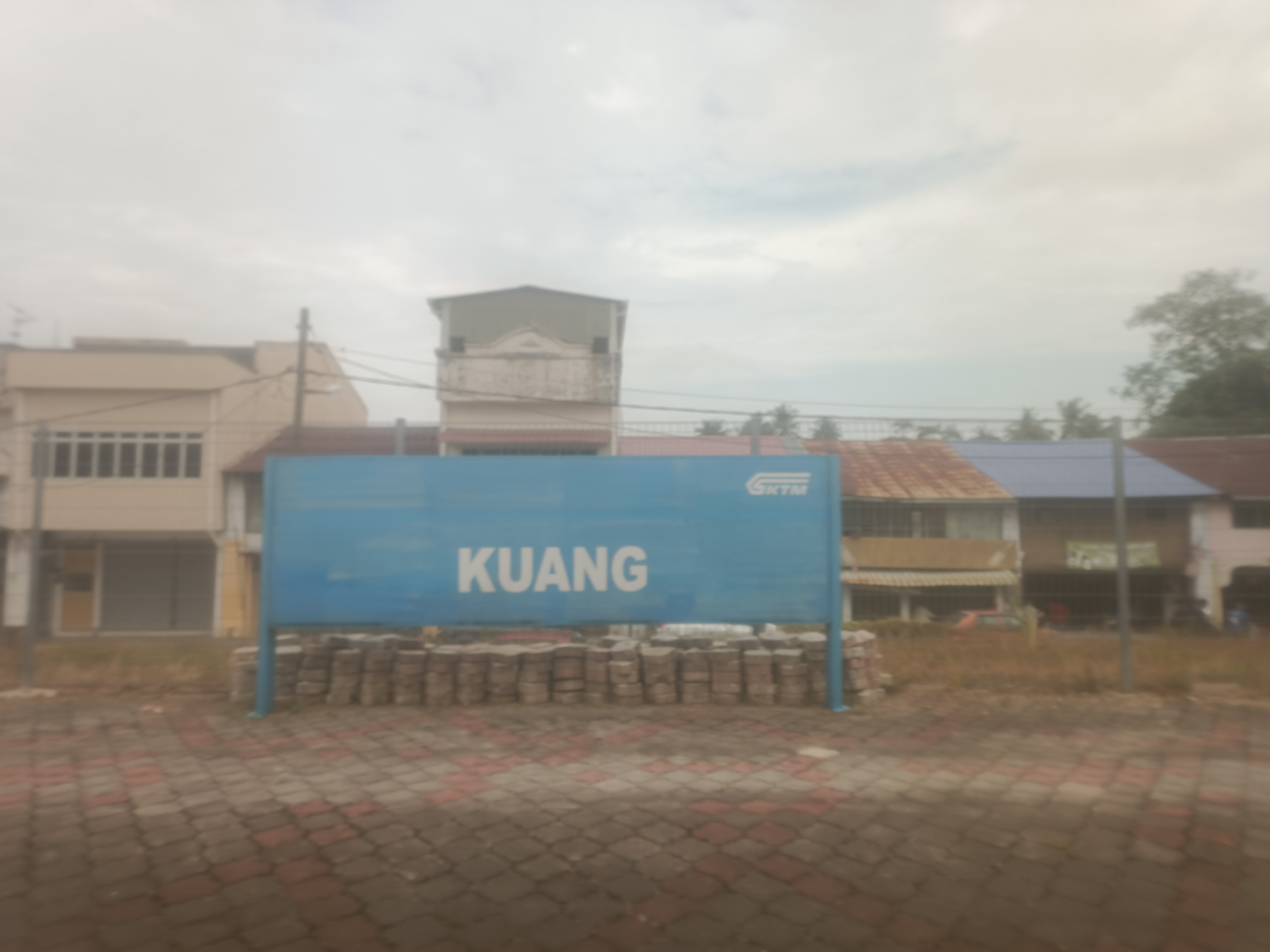

General information
- Other names: Malay: کواڠ (Jawi); Chinese: 轰埠; Tamil: குவாங்
- Location: Kuang, Gombak, Selangor, Malaysia.
- System: KA09 | Commuter rail station
- Owner: Keretapi Tanah Melayu
- Line: West Coast Line
- Platforms: 2 side platforms
- Tracks: 4

Other information
- Station code: KA09

History
- Opened: 1892
- Rebuilt: 1995
- Electrified: 1995

Services
Preceding station	Keretapi Tanah Melayu (Komuter)	Following station
Rawang towards Tanjung Malim	Tanjung Malim–Port Klang Line	Sungai Buloh towards Port Klang
Location

The Kuang Komuter station is a Malaysian commuter train station located in Kuang, Gombak District, Selangor, Malaysia. Since December 2015, this station is served by the Tanjung Malim–Port Klang Line of the KTM Komuter service. Previously, it was on the Rawang–Seremban Line.

== Branch line ==
This station served as the start of a 23 km-long branch line to Batu Arang and Batang Berjuntai during the colonial era, but the line was closed in 1971.
