= Selangor State Route B35 =

Road in Malaysia

Selangor Route 35
- Jalan Bukit Badong

Route information
- Length: 7 km (4.3 mi)

Major junctions
- North end: Bestari Jaya (Batang Berjuntai)
- B33 State Route B33; B27 State Route B27; FT 54 Federal Route 54
- South end: Ijok

Location
- Country: Malaysia
- Primary destinations: Bukit Badong

Highway system
- Highways in Malaysia; Expressways; Federal; State

Selangor State Route B35, Jalan Bukit Badong is a major road in Selangor, Malaysia.

== Junction lists ==
The entire route is located in Kuala Selangor District, Selangor.

Legend:

- I/C - Interchange, I/S - Intersection, RSA - Rest and service area, OBR - Overhead bridge restaurant, R/R - Restaurant and rest plaza, L/B - Layby, V/P - Vista point, TN - tunnel, T/P - Toll plaza, BR - Bridge
- C - Cloverleaf, S - Stack, T-A - Trumpet-A, T-B - Trumpet-B, DT - Directional-T/Y, SDT - Semi-Directional-T/Y, P-Y - Partial-Y, D - Diamond, P-C - Partial cloverleaf, D-D - Diverging diamond, D-R - Direct ramp

Location	km	mi	Name	Destinations	Notes
Bestari Jaya			Bestari Jaya (Batang Berjuntai)	B33 Selangor State Route B33 – Kuala Selangor, Kampung Kuantan, Kampung Kuantan fireflies B27 Selangor State Route B27 – Sungai Tengi, Batu Arang, Rawang	T-junctions
Bestari Jaya			Taman Seri Berjuntai		
Bestari Jaya			Kampung Jaya Setia		
Bukit Badong			Bukit Badong Estate		
Bukit Badong			Kampung Bukit Badong		
Ijok			Ijok	FT 54 Malaysia Federal Route 54 – Kuala Selangor, Tanjung Karang, Sabak Bernam, Shah Alam, Klang, Sungai Buloh, Kuala Lumpur	T-junctions
1.000 mi = 1.609 km; 1.000 km = 0.621 mi
