= SMK Raja Muda Musa =

Location
- Jalan Bukit Badong, 45600; Bestari Jaya, Selangor; Malaysia

Information
- Other name: SMKRMM
- Former name: SMK Batang Berjuntai
- Type: Public coeducational secondary
- Motto: SABAR, YAKIN, USAHA, TEKUN, JAYA (PATIENT, CONFIDENT, EFFORT, DILIGENT, SUCCESS)
- Established: 1965
- School district: Kuala Selangor
- Session: Morning & Afternoon
- Principal: En Mohd. Shuieb bin Ismail
- Grades: Form 1 - Form 5 (Secondary 1 - Secondary 5)
- Enrollment: 1446 (June 2017)
- Language: Bahasa Malaysia, English, Mandarin, Tamil
- Campus: Rural
- Colors: Red, Yellow and Green
- Yearbook: SEMESRA
- Website: www.smkrmm.edupage.org

Sekolah Menengah Kebangsaan Raja Muda Musa (English: Raja Muda Musa National Secondary School) or SMKRMM, is a public secondary school located in Bestari Jaya, Kuala Selangor District, Selangor. It was established in 1965. It has almost 1450 students and 120 teachers by June 2017.

The school welcomed its first Multi-purpose hall in early 2017, the hall can approximately accommodate up to 1000 peoples at the same time. The hall is one of the largest hall among the schools in Kuala Selangor district.
