= Malaysia Bible Seminary =

- Type: Seminary
- Established: 1978
- Principal: Dr [Jason Lim Jit Fong]
- Location: Kuang, Malaysia
- Website: mbs.org.my

Malaysia Bible Seminary (MBS) is an interdenominational evangelical seminary located in the town of Kuang, Gombak District, Selangor, Malaysia to train local Christians preparing for ministry. The seminary was established in 1978, originally located at Luther House, Petaling Jaya, Selangor.

The Chinese Department was established with the transfer of 5 students from the Malaysia Christian Training Centre, Rawang, which then closed. The English Department was established in the same year with the merging of the Pusat Latihan Kristian Melaka (Malacca Christian Training Centre, established in 1976) into the seminary. Both of the predecessor centres were founded with the help of OMF International.

The founding principal was Rev. Dr. Lukas Tjandra from Indonesia. Due to immigration restrictions, he left Malaysia in 1986, and was succeeded by the second principal, Rev. Dr. Lee Ken Ang in 1989. The third principal, Rev. Dr. Tan Kim Sai, was appointed in 1997, and was succeeded by the fourth Principal Dr. Jason Lim January, 2010 to December, 2014. Rev. Dr. Lee Mee Onn served as the fifth from 2015 to 2022 before passing on the responsibility of the principal to Dr. Jason Lim to serve as the sixth principal w.e.f. January, 2023.

== Key personnel ==
- Council Chairman:

Prof. Dr. Tan Chong Tin

- Council Vice-Chairman:

Pr. Dato' Dr. Daniel Ho

== English Department ==
- Dean:

Rev. Dr. Tony Lim

- Associate Dean:

Allison Lee

- Chaplain:

Rev. Dr. Barnabas Boon

== Chinese Department ==
- Dean:

Pr. Chong Sit Wah

- Course Masters:

Rev. Dr. Cheryl Eng

- Dean of Students:

Rev. Tsang Yuk Ming

== Center for Christianity and Malaysian Studies(CCMS) ==
- Director of CCMS:

Dr. Tan Hann Tzuu

== Programs ==
MBS offers academic programs leading to the awarding of the following qualifications:

=== Undergraduate ===
- Certificate in Theology (2 Years)
- Diploma in Theology (3 Years)
- Bachelor of Ministry (4 Years)
- Bachelor of Theology (4 Years)

=== Graduate ===
- Graduate Diploma in Ministry (1 Year)
- Graduate Diploma in Christian Studies (1 Year)
- Master of Christian Studies (2 Years)
- Master of Ministry (2 Years)
- Master of Divinity (3 Years)

== Accreditation ==
The following programs offered by MBS are accredited by the ATA:

- Diploma in Theology
- Bachelor of Ministry
- Bachelor of Theology
- Graduate Diploma in Christian Studies
- Master of Christian Studies
- Master of Ministry
- Master of Divinity
