= Kuala Lumpur–Rawang Highway =

Road in Malaysia

Federal Route 1
- Kuala Lumpur–Rawang Highway
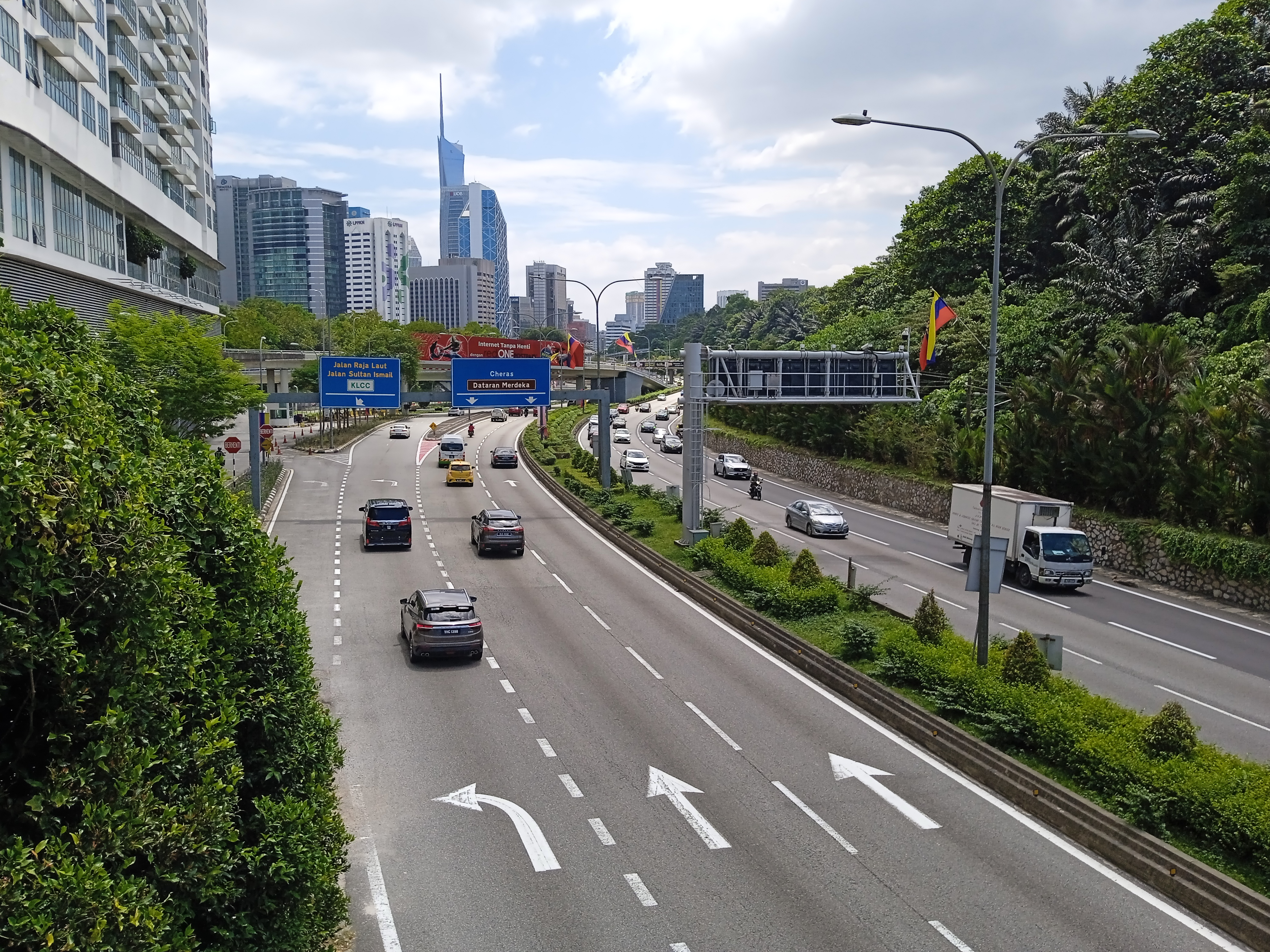

Route information
- Maintained by Malaysian Public Works Department
- Existed: 1985–present
- History: Completed in 1987

Major junctions
- North end: Rawang, Selangor
- FT 3209 / B27 Federal Route 3209; Kuala Lumpur–Kuala Selangor Expressway; FT 37 Rawang Bypass; B21 State Route B21; FT 28 Kuala Lumpur Middle Ring Road 2 FT 54 Federal Route 54; Jalan Ipoh Duta–Ulu Klang Expressway / AH141; Jalan Tuanku Abdul Halim (Jalan Duta); Kuala Lumpur Middle Ring Road 1
- South end: Jalan Sultan Ismail, Kuala Lumpur

Location
- Country: Malaysia
- Primary destinations: Ipoh, Bandar Baru Selayang, Selayang, Batu Caves, Kepong, Segambut

Highway system
- Highways in Malaysia; Expressways; Federal; State

Kuala Lumpur–Rawang Highway, Federal Route 1, also known as Jalan Kuching and Jalan Ipoh, is a major controlled-access highway in Klang Valley region, Malaysia.

== History ==
The most controversial development of the FT1 highway in Kuala Lumpur was the toll collection at Jalan Kuching FT1. The nine-year concession of Jalan Kuching FT1 was awarded to Kamunting Corporation Berhad, signed on 15 April 1985. In the original concessionaire agreement, Kamunting Corporation Berhad was required to build an interchange at Kepong Roundabout and to upgrade the Jalan Kepong FT54, in return for the nine-year toll collection rights starting from 1987 until 1996. However, in 1987, the concessionaire agreement was amended, and Kamunting Corporation Berhad was required to add two more lanes from the existing four lanes along Jalan Kuching FT1, resulting another 7-year extension of toll concession which was ended in 2003. The toll collection at Jalan Kuching FT1 had sparked fury among Kuala Lumpurian motorists, and numerous protests were held to urge the government to end the toll collection there. The toll collection at Jalan Kuching FT1 was finally abolished on 8 January 2003.

The Segambut roundabout was upgraded into four-level interchange. Construction began in 2004 and was completed by the end of 2006. The project was led by Malaysian Public Works Department (JKR), Kuala Lumpur City Hall (DBKL) and the main contractor was Ahmad Zaki Resources Berhad (AZRB). This four-level interchange was opened to traffic on 26 February 2007.

The 2-lane single-carriageway section between Bandar Baru Selayang and Templer Park was upgraded to 4-lane dual-carriageway with emergency lanes and several U-turns. Construction started in 2006 and was expected to be completed in 2009.

== Features ==
- The entire section is 4-lane dual-carriageway with emergency lanes and several U-turns
- One four-level interchange at Segambut roundabout
- One former Toll Plaza located at Jalan Kuching-DUKE interchange
- Templer Park

At most sections, the Kuala Lumpur–Rawang Highway was built under the JKR R5 road standard, allowing maximum speed limit of up to 90 km/h.

== Interchange lists ==
Legend:

- I/C - Interchange, I/S - Intersection, RSA - Rest and service area, OBR - Overhead bridge restaurant, R/R - Restaurant and rest plaza, L/B - Layby, V/P - Vista point, TN - tunnel, T/P - Toll plaza, BR - Bridge
- C - Cloverleaf, S - Stack, T-A - Trumpet-A, T-B - Trumpet-B, DT - Directional-T/Y, SDT - Semi-Directional-T/Y, P-Y - Partial-Y, D - Diamond, P-C - Partial cloverleaf, D-D - Diverging diamond, D-R - Direct ramp

States	District	Km	Exit	Name	Destinations	Notes
Through to FT 1 Malaysia Federal Route 1
Selangor	Gombak		I/C	Rawang Sentral I/C	FT 3209 / B27 Malaysia Federal Route 3209 – Batu Arang, Bestari Jaya (Batang Berjuntai); North–South Expressway Northern Route / AH2 – Ipoh, Kuala Lumpur, Klang, Kuala Lumpur International Airport (KLIA), Johor Bahru	Diamond interchange
Selangor	Gombak			Kampung Dato' Lee Kim Sai		
Selangor	Gombak		I/S	Jalan Rawang Perdana I/S	Jalan Rawang Perdana – Rawang Perdana, Rawang Putra	T-junctions
Selangor	Gombak			Taman Bersatu		
Selangor	Gombak			Kampung Kenanga		
Selangor	Gombak			Perumahan PKNS Batu 17 Rawang		
Selangor	Gombak			Taman Mawar		
Selangor	Gombak			Kampung Melayu Batu 16		
Selangor	Gombak			Taman Setia Rawang		
Selangor	Gombak		I/C	Templer's Park-Latar I/C	Kuala Lumpur–Kuala Selangor Expressway – Kuala Selangor, Ipoh, Shah Alam	Directional-T interchange
Selangor	Gombak		I/C	Rawang Bypass	FT 37 Rawang Bypass – Batang Kali, Serendah, Sungai Choh	Interchange from/to Kuala Lumpur
Selangor	Gombak			Hutan Lipur Kanching (Kanching Forest Reserve)	Hutan Lipur Kanching (Kanching Forest Reserve) – V Kanching Waterfall, Taman Templer Heritage, Templer Villas	Southbound
Selangor	Gombak			U-Turn	U-Turn	U-Turn
Selangor	Gombak			Templer's Park (Taman Rimber Templer)	Persiaran Bukit Takun – Templer's Park (Taman Rimber Templer), Templer Park Resort, Templer Park Country Club, The Templer Park, Rainforest Retreat; Perangsang Templer Golf Club, Taman Templer Heritage, Templer Villas, Taman Templer Suasana, Taman Templer Bestari, National Craft Institute (Institut Kraftangan Negara)	Kuala Lumpur bound
Selangor	Gombak		L/B	Shell L/B	Shell L/B – Shell	Southbound
Selangor	Gombak			U-Turn	U-Turn	U-Turn
Selangor	Gombak			Taman Templer Saujana	Jalan TS 1 – Taman Templer Saujana	Northbound
Selangor	Gombak			Templer's Park (Taman Rimber Templer)	Templer's Park (Taman Rimber Templer) – V Waterfall	Kuala Lumpur bound
Selangor	Gombak			Selayang Heights	Persiaran Selayang Heights – Selayang Heights, Andara Townvilla	Southbound
Selangor	Gombak			Taman Amansiara	Persiaran Amansiara – Taman Amansiara	Dedicated interchange with one ramp to Kuala Lumpur
Selangor	Gombak		I/C	Bandar Baru Selayang North I/C	Jalan Taman Bidara – Taman Bidara; Persiaran 1 – Bandar Baru Selayang, Malaysian Examination Council (MPM) headquarters, Gombak district and land office, Bandar Baru Selayang Industrial Area, Selayang Municipal Council (MPS) main headquarters, MPS Stadium	Diamond interchange
Selangor	Gombak			Prima Selayang Industrial Park		
Selangor	Gombak		I/C	Bandar Baru Selayang South I/C	B21 Selangor State Route B21 – Selayang Hospital, Forest Research Institute Malaysia (FRIM); Jalan Besar – Bandar Baru Selayang, Bandar Baru Selayang Industrial Area, Selayang Municipal Council (MPS) main headquarters, MPS Stadium	Diamond interchange
Selangor	Gombak			Selayang Pandang		
Kuala Lumpur				Selayang Baru I/C	Jalan Selayang Baru – Taman Selayang Baru, Pasar Borong Selayang; Trumpet Interchange; Jalan 1/2B – Taman Desa Bakti, Taman Wilayah Selayang, Taman Sri Murni	Southbound
Kuala Lumpur				Pasar Borong Selayang		Southbound
Kuala Lumpur				Pusat Bandar Utara Selayang	Jalan 6/3A – Pusat Bandar Utara Selayang	Northbound
Kuala Lumpur				Taman Batu View		Northbound
Kuala Lumpur				Selayang; Selayang Exit	B22 Selangor State Route B22 – Batu Caves	Southbound
Kuala Lumpur			I/C	Batu Caves Roundabout I/C	FT 28 Kuala Lumpur Middle Ring Road 2 – Kuala Selangor, Sungai Buloh, Petaling Jaya, Kepong, Batu Caves, Gombak, Genting Highlands, Kuantan	Multi-level stacked roundabout interchange
Kuala Lumpur				Sri Utara Business Park		Northbound
Kuala Lumpur				Taman Wahyu		Northbound
Kuala Lumpur				Taman Wahyu Komuter station	Taman Wahyu Komuter station KTM Komuter	
Kuala Lumpur				Tesco Extra Selayang Hypermarket		Northbound
Kuala Lumpur				Taman Tasik Indah I/C	Taman Tasik Indah Flyover; Jalan 2/18C – Taman Tasik Indah	Directional interchange from/to Kuala Lumpur
Kuala Lumpur				Kampung Batu		Northbound
Kuala Lumpur			I/C	Kepong Roundabout I/C	FT 54 Jalan Kepong – Kepong, Jinjang, Kuala Selangor; Jalan Ipoh – Segambut, Sentul	Roundabout interchange with ramp from Kepong to Kuala Lumpur
Kuala Lumpur				Taman Segambut Indah	Taman Segambut Indah, Taman Sri Kuching, Taman City, Taman Niaga Waris	Southbound
Kuala Lumpur				Taman Batu	Taman Batu, Taman Siti, Taman Lawa, Taman Sejahtera, Taman Kok Doh	Northbound
Kuala Lumpur			I/C	Jalan Kuching-DUKE I/C (former Jln. Kuching Toll Plaza location)	Duta–Ulu Klang Expressway (Duta–Sentul Pasar–Ulu Klang Link (Main Link)) / AH141 – Ipoh, Klang, Petaling Jaya, Kepong, Segambut, Ulu Klang, Gombak, Batu Caves, Kuantan, Seremban, KLCC, City Centre, Bulatan Pahang, Sentul	Semi cloverleaf interchange
Kuala Lumpur			BR	Railway crossing bridge		
Kuala Lumpur			BR	Sungai Keroh bridge		
Kuala Lumpur				Taman Segambut	Taman Segambut	Interchange
Kuala Lumpur			I/C	Segambut Roundabout I/C	Jalan Tuanku Abdul Halim (Jalan Duta) – Segambut, Jalan Ipoh, Petaling Jaya, Jalan Duta, Hentian Duta New Klang Valley Expressway / AH2 / AH141 – Ipoh, Klang, Kuala Lumpur International Airport (KLIA), Johor Bahru	Multi-level stacked roundabout interchange
Kuala Lumpur			I/C	PWTC I/C	Kuala Lumpur Middle Ring Road 1 – Malaysia Houses of Parliament, Bangsar, Petaling Jaya, Putra World Trade Centre (PWTC), Jalan Sentul, Jalan Pahang, Jalan Tun Razak, Kuala Lumpur City Centre (KLCC)	Interchange
Kuala Lumpur			I/C	Jalan Sultan Ismail I/C	Kuala Lumpur Inner Ring Road – Jalan Sultan Ismail, Jalan Raja Laut, Jalan Tuanku Abdul Rahman, Kuala Lumpur City Centre (KLCC)	Directional-T interchange
Through to FT 1 Kuala Lumpur Inner Ring Road (Jalan Kuching)

== See also ==
- Federal Route 1
- Cheras Highway
- Kuala Lumpur
