= Rawang Bypass =

Road in Malaysia

Federal Route 37
- Rawang Bypass; Jalan Pintasan Rawang 万挠绕道
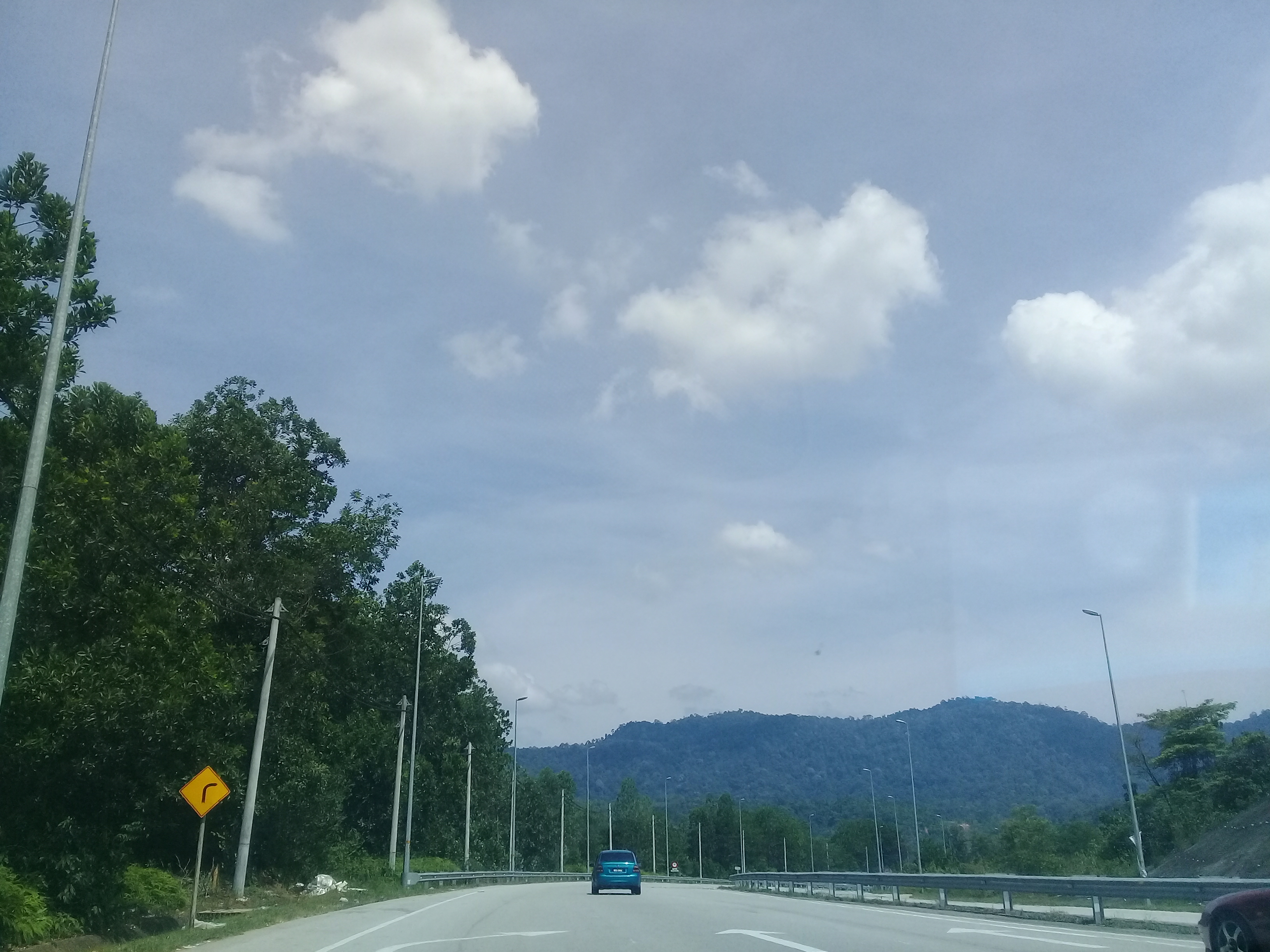

Route information
- Maintained by Malaysian Public Works Department
- Length: 10.662 km (6.625 mi)
- Existed: 2005–present
- History: Completed in 2017

Major junctions
- North end: Serendah South interchange
- FT 1 Federal Route 1 FT 1 Kuala Lumpur–Rawang Highway
- South end: Taman Rimba Templer interchange

Location
- Country: Malaysia
- Primary destinations: Kuala Kubu Bharu, Serendah, Batang Kali, Bandar Baru Selayang, Selayang, Batu Caves

Highway system
- Highways in Malaysia; Expressways; Federal; State

Rawang Bypass, Federal Route 37 also known as Rawang–Serendah Highway, is a federally-funded divided highway bypass in Rawang, Selangor, Malaysia. The 10-km highway was opened to traffic on 28 November 2017 at 9.00 pm. Construction of the RM628mil Rawang Bypass began on 16 July 2005 and was completed on 21 November 2017. It features a 2.7-km elevated viaduct with its highest pillar of 58.2 meters.

The Rawang Bypass FT37 was built to solve the traffic congestion along the Malaysia Federal Route 1 in the town centre of Rawang. It was reported that the travelling time from Serendah to Selayang via the Kuala Lumpur–Ipoh Road FT1 may take up to 2 hours due to severe congestion in Rawang town centre. The Rawang Bypass FT37 helps to reduce the travelling time to only 30 minutes.

== Background ==
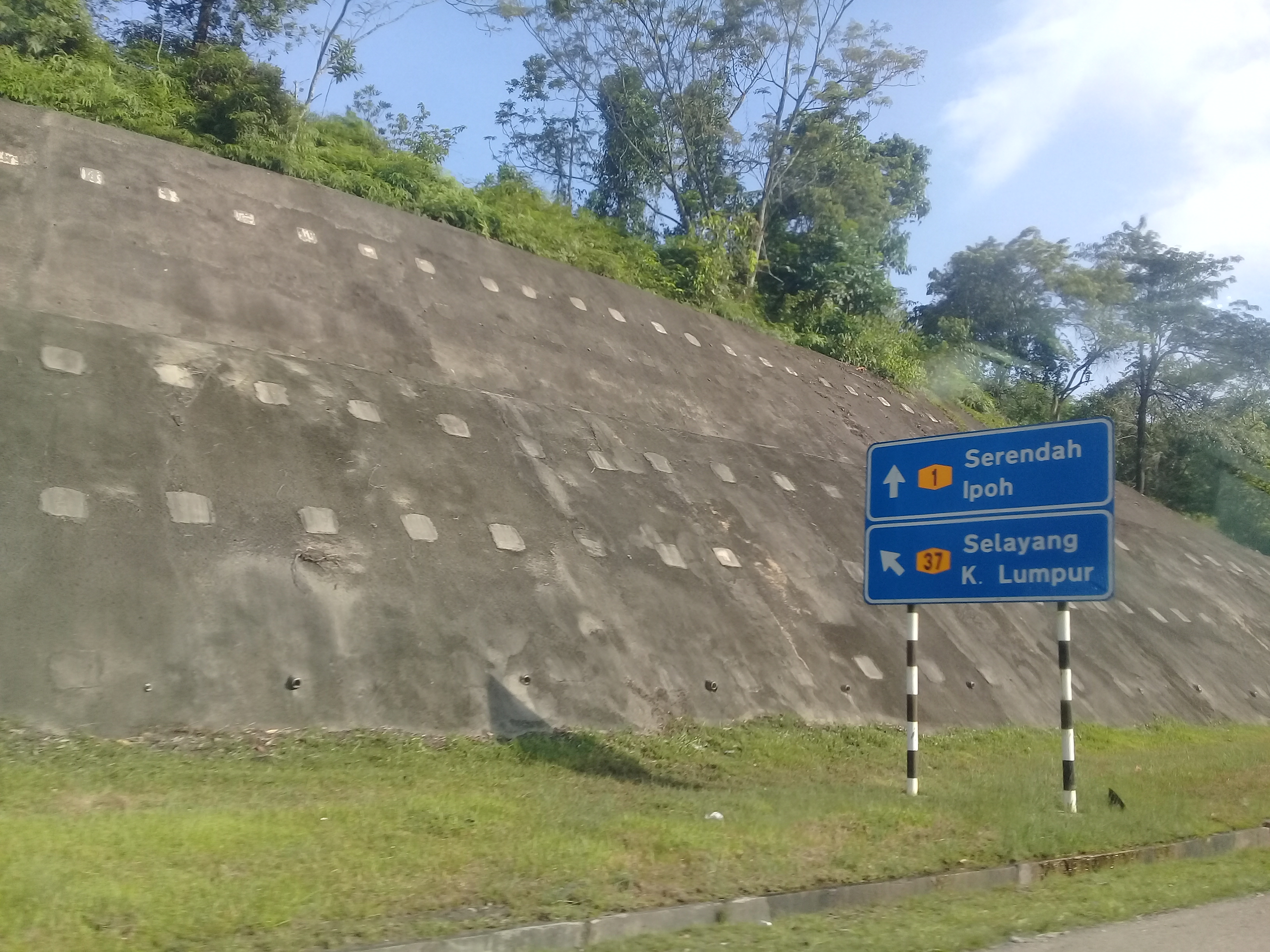
FT37 enter sign at FT1

The Rawang Bypass FT37 is a 9-km divided highway that runs from Templer Park to Serendah. It continues from Kuala Lumpur–Rawang Highway FT1, where the FT1 highway is diverted to Rawang, before ascending uphill via a 2.7-km viaduct with the gradient of 5.8%. The Rawang Bypass viaduct has its highest pillar at the height of 58.2 metres (191 ft), making it the second highest roadway viaduct in Malaysia after the 61.5 m (202 ft) Jalan Bukit Kukus Paired Road on Penang Island. The remaining 6.3-km section is built at ground level. The Rawang Bypass FT37 ends at Kuala Lumpur—Ipoh Road FT1 near Serendah via a trumpet interchange.

Along the FT37 highway, only two interchanges exist, with about three stub LILO intersections and a fast lane-to-fast lane U-turn near its northern terminus for southbound traffic.

== History ==
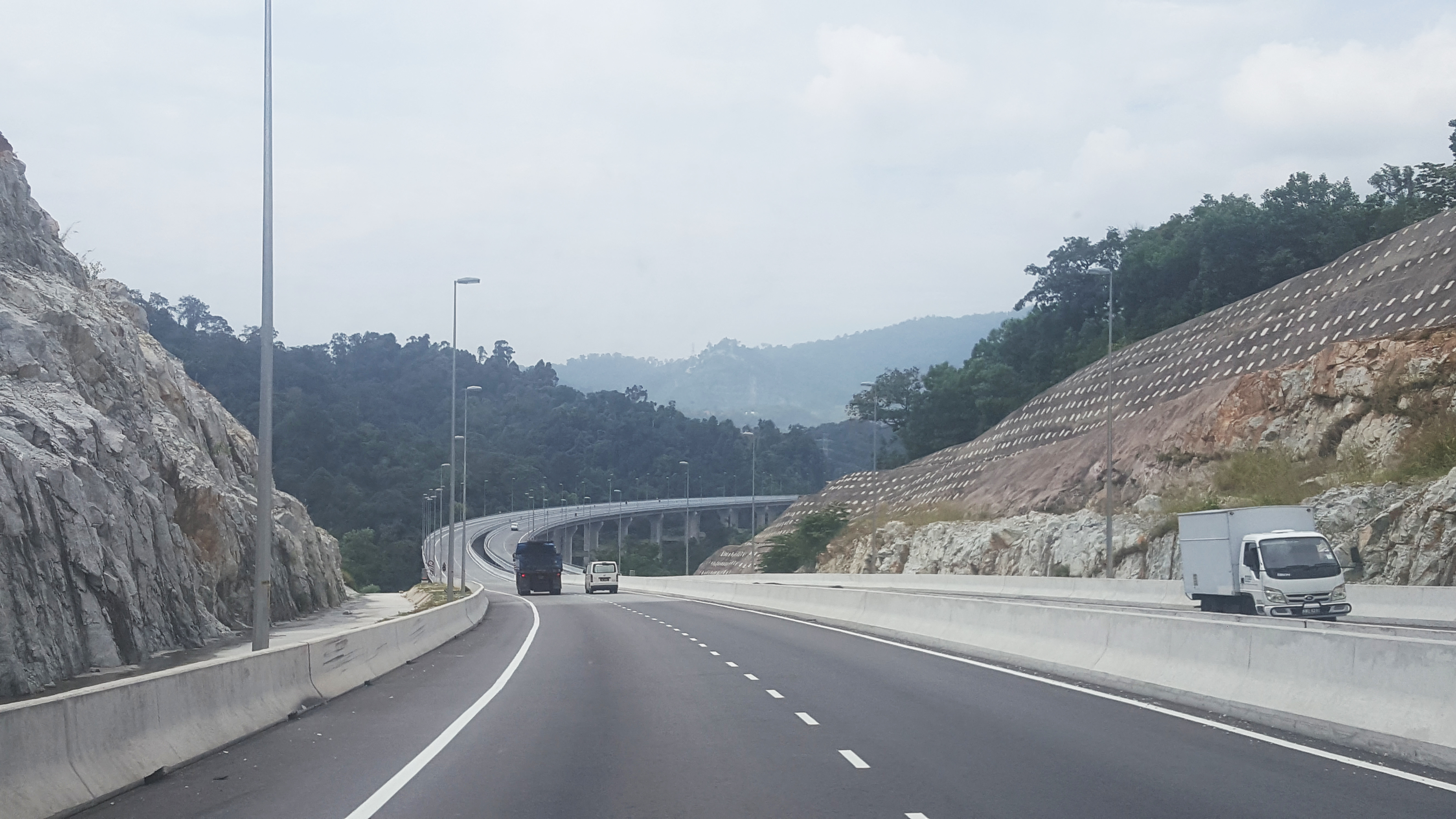
Rawang Bypass

The Rawang Bypass FT37 project is a revival of the Kuala Lumpur Arah Serendah Expressway (KLAS), also known as the Kuala Lumpur–Rawang Expressway, which was scrapped due to the effect of the 1997 Asian financial crisis. The project was initially supposed to be constructed as a controlled-access expressway that would run along the Federal Route 1 corridor, with LeKLAS Sdn. Bhd. being appointed as its concessionaire and constructor.

The project was revived by the federal government in 2005 as the Rawang Bypass project due to severe traffic congestion in Rawang. However, the Rawang Bypass project was constructed not as a controlled-access toll expressway but rather as a limited-access divided highway. The contract of the RM628 million highway construction job was awarded to Syarikat Panzana Enterprise Sdn. Bhd. Construction of the Rawang Bypass FT37 commenced on 16 July 2005.

Construction of the Rawang Bypass project was divided into two stages. The first stage was to upgrade the existing the 12.5-km two-lane Kuala Lumpur–Ipoh Road FT1 from Bandar Baru Selayang to Templer Park into a divided highway known as the Kuala Lumpur–Rawang Highway FT1, completed in 2007. The second stage was to build a completely new bypass route that diverts the through traffic away from the town centre of Rawang.

=== Environmental issues ===
The construction of the second stage took a longer time due to environmental concern towards the project. Initially, the planned route was longer, would be built completely on ground level and might run through the Selangor State Heritage Park and Templer Park. Due to protests from environmentalists and pressure from local residents who insisted on going ahead with the project despite possible environmental issues, the route was realigned and redesigned, and a 2.7-km viaduct was constructed along the border of the Selangor State Heritage Park to minimize the negative impact towards the critically endangered Giam Kanching trees which is an endemic species and can only be found nowhere else but in the heritage park. Through the viaduct construction approach, the affected forest area was reduced from 65 hectares to only 24 hectares. The Rawang Bypass FT37 was completed on 21 November 2017, after 12 years of construction.

Due to the very long construction period, a hoax claiming the opening ceremony of the Rawang Bypass FT37 to be held on 15 November 2017 went viral through social media on 13 November 2017, which was denied by the Malaysian Public Works Department. Instead, the actual opening ceremony was held on 28 November 2017.

== Interchange lists ==
The entire route is located in Selangor.

Legend:

- I/C - Interchange, I/S - Intersection, RSA - Rest and service area, OBR - Overhead bridge restaurant, R/R - Restaurant and rest plaza, L/B - Layby, V/P - Vista point, TN - tunnel, T/P - Toll plaza, BR - Bridge
- C - Cloverleaf, S - Stack, T-A - Trumpet-A, T-B - Trumpet-B, DT - Directional-T/Y, SDT - Semi-Directional-T/Y, P-Y - Partial-Y, D - Diamond, P-C - Partial cloverleaf, D-D - Diverging diamond, D-R - Direct ramp

| District | Location | km | mi | Exit | Name | Destinations | Notes |
|---|---|---|---|---|---|---|---|
| Hulu Selangor | Serendah | | | | Serendah South I/C | FT 1 Malaysia Federal Route 1 – Tanjung Malim, Kuala Kubu Bharu, Serendah, Rawang, Bestari Jaya, Bukit Beruntung; North–South Expressway Northern Route / AH2 – Ipoh, Kuala Lumpur, Klang | Trumpet interchange |
| Hulu Selangor | Serendah | | | | U-turn | FT 1 Malaysia Federal Route 1 – Rawang, Serendah, Sg. Choh | Southbound direction only |
| Gombak | Taman Rimba Templer | | | Taman Rimba Templer Viaduct | | | |
| Gombak | Taman Rimba Templer | | | | Taman Rimba Templer I/C | FT 1 Kuala Lumpur–Rawang Highway – Rawang, Selayang, Batu Caves, Kuala Lumpur; Kuala Lumpur–Kuala Selangor Expressway – Kuala Selangor, Lumut, Shah Alam, Klang, Ipoh | From/to south only |
1.000 mi = 1.609 km; 1.000 km = 0.621 mi: Incomplete access

== See also ==
- Malaysia Federal Route 1
- Kuala Lumpur–Rawang Highway - another component of the Rawang Bypass project
- Interstate 70 (Glenwood Canyon) - another highway project with similar environmental approach
