= Sungai Pelong =

Human settlement in Malaysia

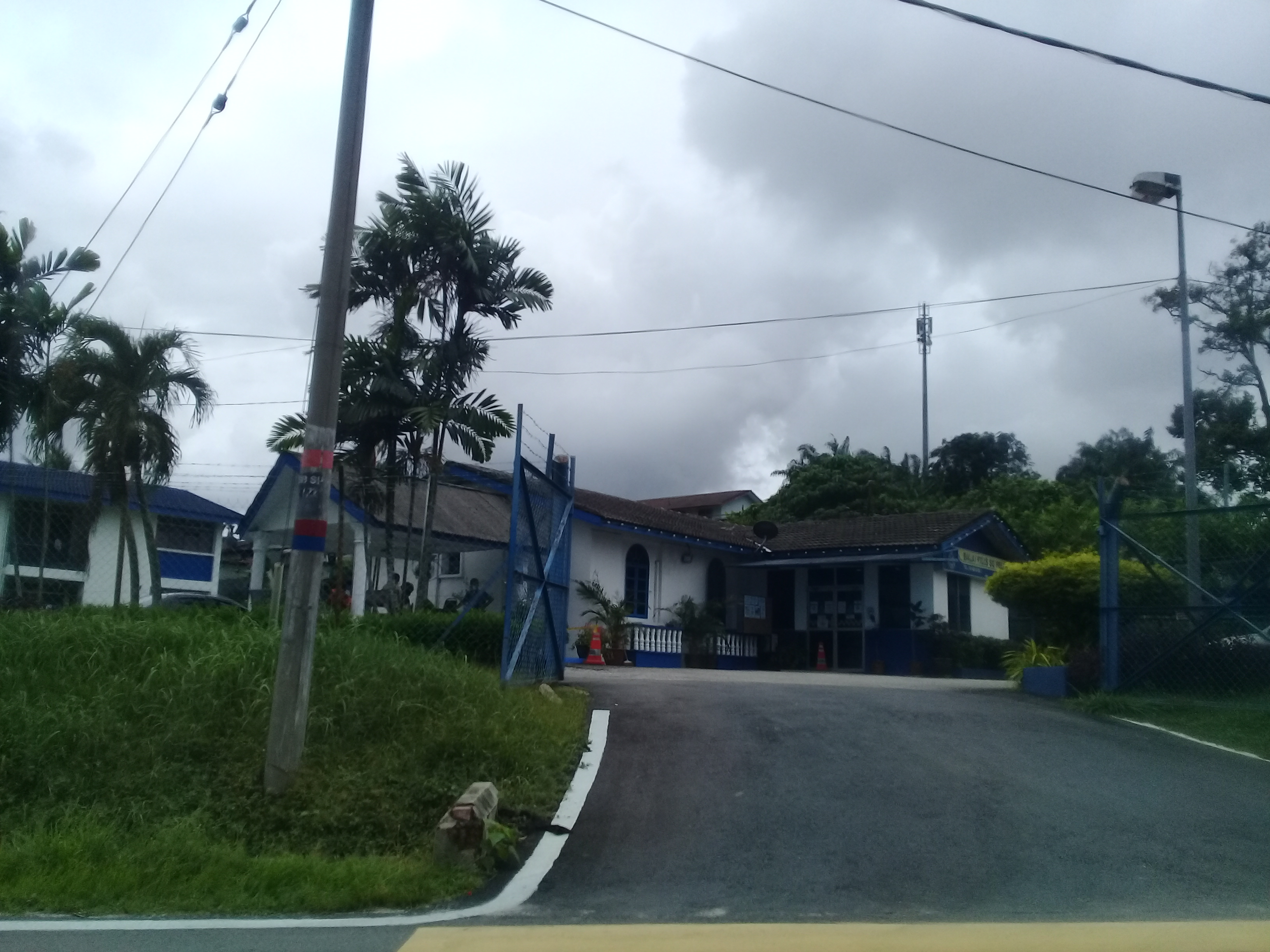
Sungai Pelong Police Station, 2022.

Sungai Pelong is a small town in Petaling District, Selangor, Malaysia.

== Transportation ==
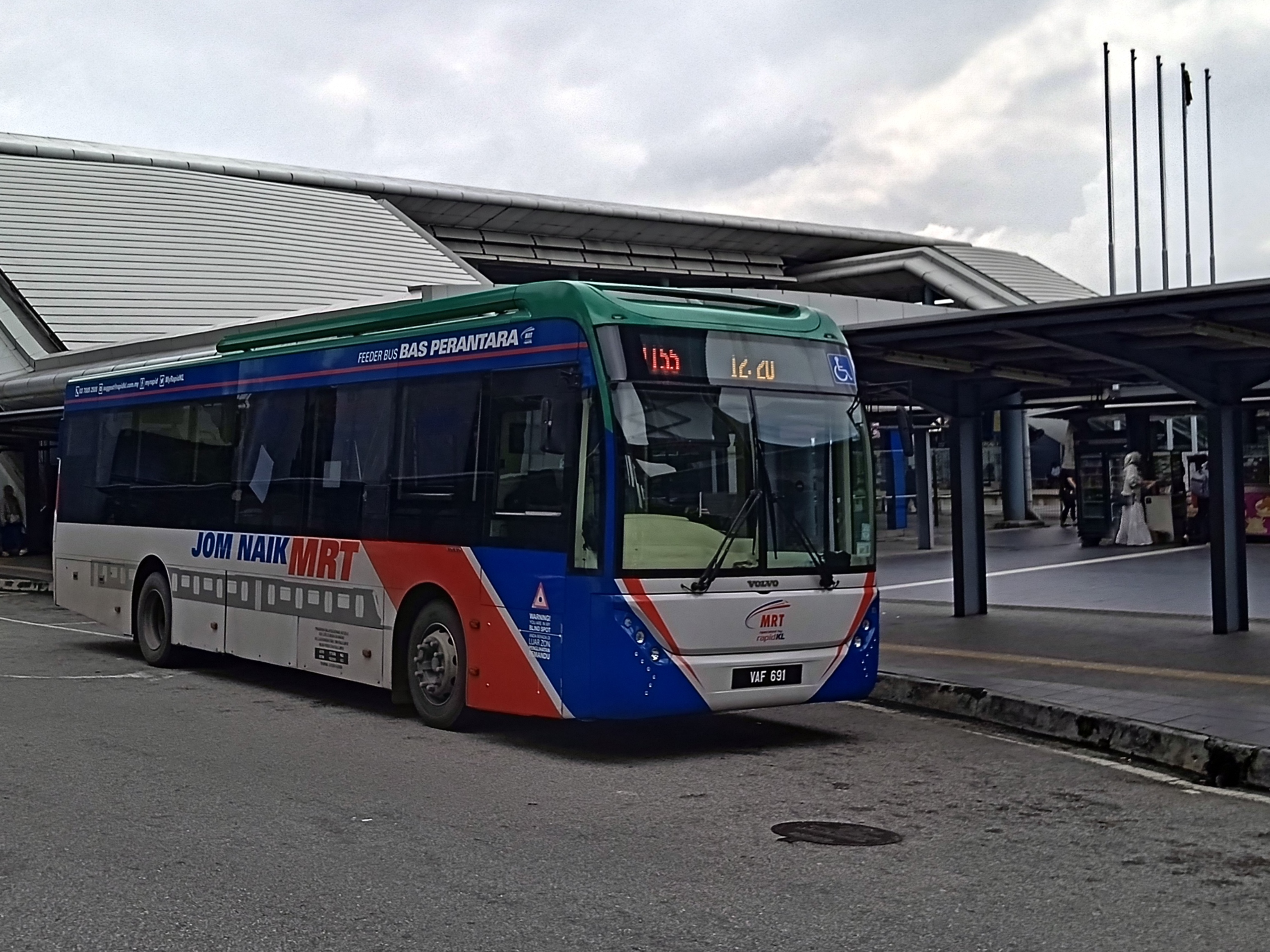
Rapid KL bus route T155, 2023.

The area is accessible by Rapid KL MRT feeder bus (Bas Perantara MRT) route T155 from Sungai Buloh MRT station to Kota Puteri.
