= Lagong =

Town in Gombak, Selangor, Malaysia

Coordinates: 3.2620644°N 101.6358505°E

Lagong or Bukit Lagong is a small town and a forest reserve area in Selayang, Selangor, Malaysia, located between Kuang and Batu Caves.

One of Guthrie Berhad's estates were located here, which were part of the "Guthrie Corridor".
