= Bandar Tasik Puteri =

Township in Gombak, Selangor, Malaysia

Bandar Tasik Puteri BTP
- Township

Other transcription(s)
  - Malay: Bandar Tasik Puteri
  - Jawi: بندر تاسيق ڤوتري

- Flag

- Bandar Tasik Puteri in Gombak District

- Location in Peninsular Malaysia
- Coordinates: 3°17′8″N 101°28′19″E
- Country: Malaysia
- State: Selangor
- Establishment: 1998

Area
  - Total: 10.80511 km^{2} (4.17188 sq mi)

Population (2020)
  - Total: 70,000
- Time zone: UTC+8 (MST)
- Website: www.btp.com.my

Bandar Tasik Puteri (est. population 150,000) is a township area near Batu Arang, Selangor, Malaysia.

== Demographics ==
As of 2013 it is estimated that there are 60,000 people residing in Bandar Tasik Puteri. The majority of the population consists of Malays, followed by Chinese and Indian communities. The area is surrounded by neighbouring Kampung Bahru Kundang village, M-Residence & M-Residence 2 (Mah Sing Group), Kundang Estates (Gamuda Land) and Bandar Baru Kundang.

== Geography ==
Bandar Tasik Puteri is a planned community, with an area of more than 2,670 acres (1,080 ha) of leasehold land and developed by Rawang Lakes Sdn Bhd, a subsidiary of Low Yat Group. It is divided into 34 sections ranging from BTP1 to BTP34. This township consists of apartments, terrace houses, semi-detached houses and super link bungalows. These sections are served by roads, e.g. Jalan 4/22 ("Jalan" is a Malay word that means road, 4 is the section and 22 is the road number.) Houses on one side of the road have even numbers, and the other side have odd numbers. Hence, one side of a road will consist of houses with numbers 2, 4, 6, 8 and so on while the opposite will have houses numbered 1, 3, 5, 7 and so forth.

== Transport ==
=== Road ===
Bandar Tasik Puteri has road networks with accessibility via New Klang Valley Expressway North–South Expressway Northern Route, North–South Expressway Northern Route North–South Expressway Northern Route, Kuala Lumpur–Kuala Selangor Expressway Kuala Lumpur–Kuala Selangor Expressway, Guthrie Corridor Expressway and Kuala Lumpur–Rawang Highway Federal Route 1 as well a shortcut through the road from Rawang–Bestari Jaya Road B27.

A new Bandar Tasik Puteri Interchange (Exit 2504) from Kuala Lumpur–Kuala Selangor Expressway is constructed to allow easier access into the Kuala Lumpur City Centre, and to decrease the traffic congestion in Jalan Batu Arang.

=== Public transportation ===
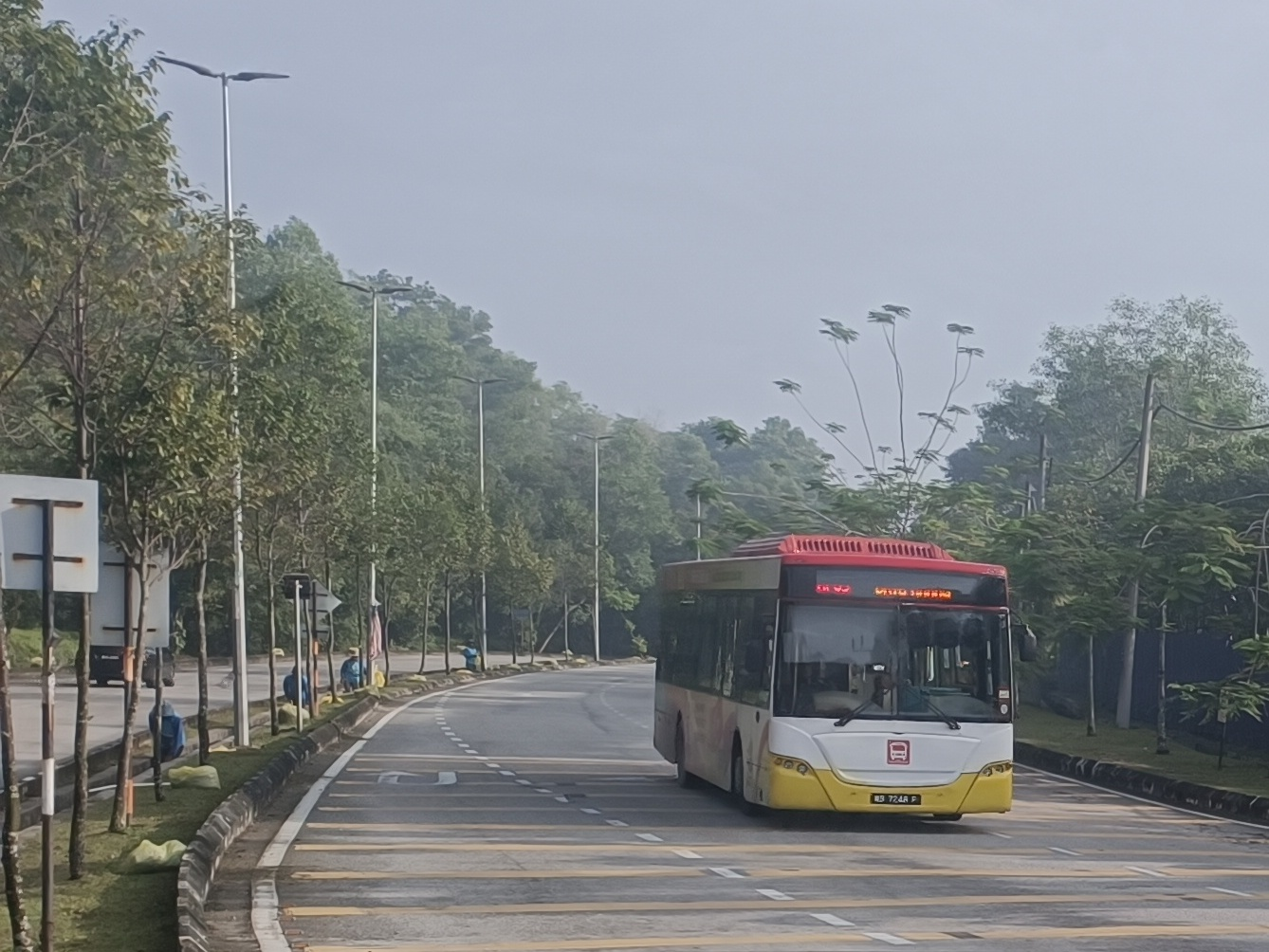
Smart Selangor Bus service in the town

SMART Selangor Bus MPS3 connects Bandar Tasik Puteri. Starting from SK Batu Arang to Masjid Sungai Buloh, the route includes important landmarks such as MRT Sungai Buloh and Hospital Sungai Buloh.

MPS3 buses stop at 7 locations within Bandar Tasik Puteri. You can wait at Simpang Tasik Puteri, Azalea Court, Pinewood Court, SMK Bandar Tasik Puteri, SK Tasik Puteri 2, Central Park, and Bandar Tasik Puteri 2. The buses offers a free ride and the operating hours from 6am to 10pm, with plate numbers WB6461M or WB7246P.

== Amenities ==
=== Place of Worship ===
Mosque / Surau

- Masjid Bandar Tasik Puteri
- Surau As-Siddiqin
- Surau Nur As-Sobirin
- Surau Al-Furqan
- Surau Al-Ikhlas, Birchwood Court
- Surau Al-Mawaddah
- Surau Al-Ikhwan
- Surau Firdaus
- Surau Al-Hidayah
- Surau Al-Kausar
- Surau Madinatul Ilmi

Buddhist Temple

- Guan Yin Temple

Hindu Temple

- Sree Kaasi Visalatchi Visvanathar Thiru Kovil

=== Education ===
There are two national primary schools and one islamic primary school in Bandar Tasik Puteri. There is only one secondary schools in Bandar Tasik Puteri.

There is also Sasana International School, which is a private institution approved and recognized by the Ministry of higher education and MQA.

For Islamic education, there are plenty of centres available and one of the centre that have been recognized by JAIS and JAKIM are Sekolah Rendah Islam Hidayatul Iman.

For early childhood development centre or kindergarten, there are centres available, such as Smart Reader Kids, Brainy Bunch Islamic Montessori and a well known Waldorf Education school, Waldorf Kelip-Kelip.

=== Leisure ===
Bandar Tasik Puteri has Tasik Puteri Golf and Country Club. It is a 27-hole Golf course with clubhouse facility. Beside that, there is also Golfview Residence Club for Bandar Tasik Puteri residents and the surrounding residential areas that provides facilities such as swimming pool, steam room, gym, meetings and conferences facilities, a ballroom, a cafe Restaurant. There are ample parking facilities available for members and guests. Both property are being managed by Federal Hotels Internationals (FHI).

A 33 acres (13 ha) Puteri Central Park, Puteri Recreational Park and a bird sanctuary are among the leisure areas for the community of Bandar Tasik Puteri.

== Administration ==
Bandar Tasik Puteri falls under the jurisdiction of the Selayang Municipal Council and Mukim Rawang. It too falls under the parliamentary constituency of Selayang, and thus is represented in parliament by William Leong Jee Keen from Pakatan Harapan-Parti Keadilan Rakyat.

In the State Assembly of Selangor, it is represented by Mohd Rafiq Mohd Abdullah of the BERSATU political party under the constituency of Kuang.
