= Kundang =

Suburb in Gombak, Selangor, Malaysia

Pengkalan Kundang ڤڠکالن کوندڠ
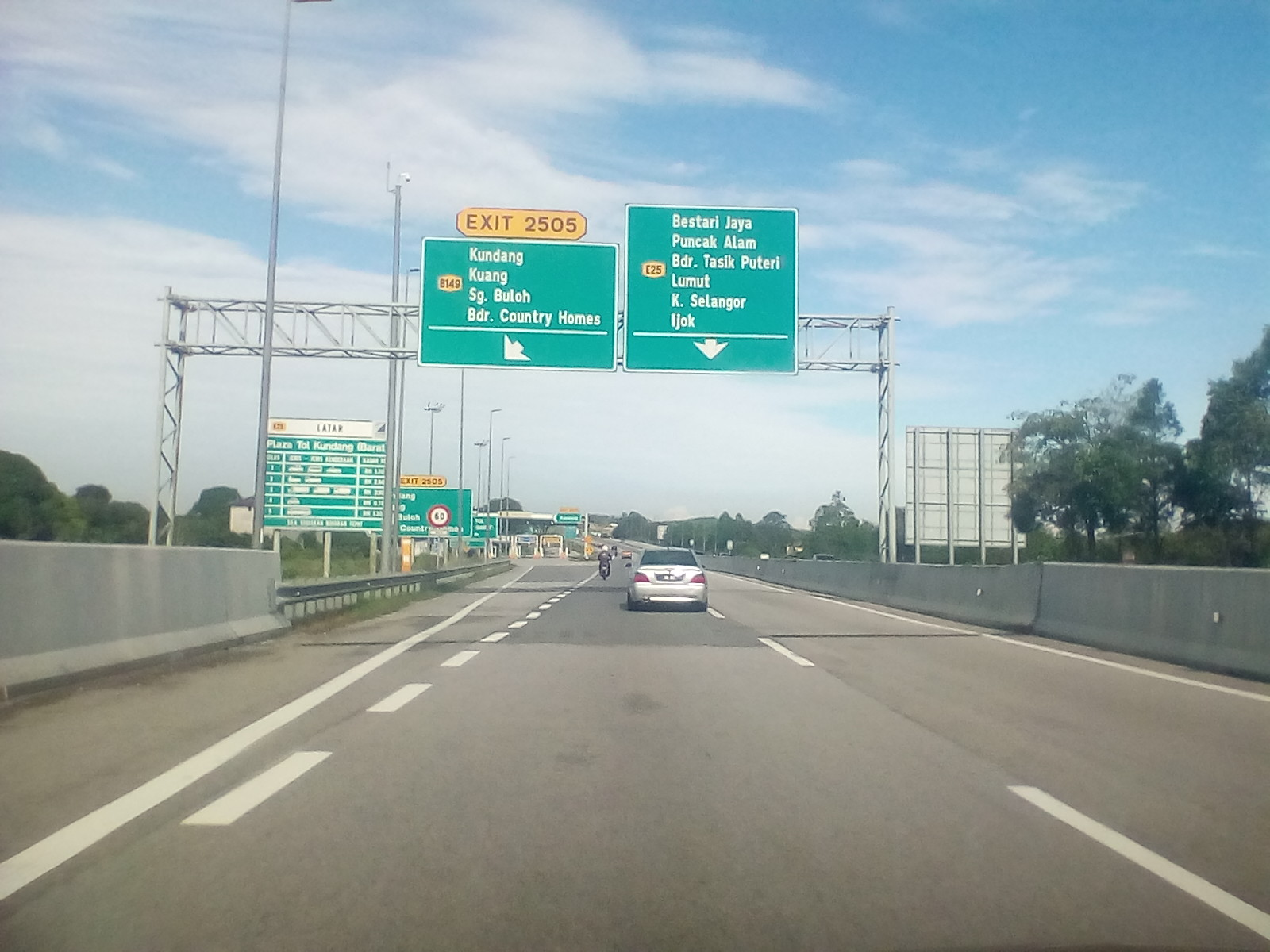
- Kundang Interchange

- Location in Peninsular Malaysia Pengkalan Kundang ڤڠکالن کوندڠ (Malaysia)
- Coordinates: 3°17′0″N 101°31′0″E
- Country: Malaysia
- State: Selangor
- Establishment: 1910
- Elevation: 26 m (85 ft)

Population
  - Estimate: 15,000
- Time zone: UTC+8 (MST)

Kundang or Pengkalan Kundang is an area in Gombak District, Selangor, Malaysia. Kundang is used to be agricultural village. But now, it is one of the modern villages in the state with its own highway, LATAR. Bandar Tasik Puteri, Pekan Kundang, Bandar Rawang is the nearest town from the village. Farming and related activities constitute the core economic drivers of this pastoral village. It comes under Selayang Parliament constituency, and falls into the jurisdiction of Majlis Perbandaran Selayang (MPS).

== Origin of name ==
The Kundang name origin comes from Sungai Kundang (Kundang River). Kundang is the Malay name for Bouea macrophylla, also known as Gandaria or Plum Mango. It originates from Malaysia and Indonesia, and this fruit have economical value in countries such as Thailand and Myanmar. Not a long time ago, the Kundang fruit have been portrayed to be a theme in Malaysia stamps collection. Its mango alike fruit, but smaller than a mango, and it has a slight sour taste from its relative. This place is called Kundang because of its connection with the Kundang tree. But Kundang trees is not visible anymore here after some hundred years passed. Many of Kundang residents did not know how a Kundang tree looks like.

== History ==
The opening of Kundang is strongly related to tin ore. At the end of the 19th century, tin ore was found in the Kundang River. This discovery attracts many Chinese immigrants to the place and the Kundang settlement was established. The Kanching territory which is in the Rawang district, have started tin mining operations in the 1840s is one of the oldest tin mining area in Selangor. After that, areas around Rawang town like Kundang and Kuang have initially started tin mining activities respectively. New settlements are also established due to tin mining. Some people said that if there is tin ore, there is Hakka people. Ka Yin and Kochow Association in Kundang proved that these two clans is the earliest Chinese immigrants settled there. Aside of the Ka Yin clan who forms the majority of residents in Kundang, another bigger clans comes from the Hui Zhou, while the minority is from the He Po clan. To boost the industry of tin mining, British colonizers had developed the railway system.

In 1915, the first railway track that connects Kundang and Kuang together with Batu Arang was built. Kundang also had a railway station due to this railway construction. After the decline of tin mining, the railway system also ceased its operation. The Kundang railway station was demolished in 1970. Abandoned railway tracks has become a proof to the history. The Kundang Tin company is the largest British-owned mining company in Kundang at the beginning of the 20th century. In the year of 1924, Kuala Lumpur Rubber company also started tin mining operations in Kundang. The company name soon changed to Kuala Lumpur Kepong Berhad. Meanwhile, Lee Li Sheng and Lee Jiu Ru, the Chinese tin tycoon from the Ka Yin descendant, who is one of the tin mining operators in Kundang. They had built the Gen Yen school in 1934 to appreciate the contribution of tin mining workers from the Hakka descendants in Kundang. In circa 1920, British had encouraged the residents to plant rubber in mass scale. The residents have been awarded land plots to plant rubber. Kundang Estate was the biggest rubber plantation estate in Kundang in that time (the area beside the Kundang Industrial Area). In the Japanese occupation from 1942 to 1945, Kundang paralyses due to war. This place was also one of the MPAJA headquarters.

This chaotic atmosphere strikes back in 1948. To break the help from being received by the MCP, British had gathered all residents who live scattered outside the Kundang area and effectively established the Kundang New Village. The Kundang Old Town is a part of Kundang New Village. A row of old shoplots that still standing until today differentiates them with the new town. According to oral stories, there is a hundred year old well in Kundang Old Town. But due to low pressure water, water rationing is always carried out in Kundang. Therefore, many of Kundang residents still using this well until today. The Kundang New Village has 200 families with approximately 1500 people when it was first established. After 30 years, the differences of total residents is not really significant. The total residents in 1954 is 1525 people and 1565 in 1970. This reflects migration of residents. But now the condition is far better, with the 5800 increase in 1995.

The village estimated to have 7000 residents before the 1980s, when the decline of tin mining and rubber made Kundang became deserted again. To find new sources of living, residents had started to plant papaya in land plots, hundreds of acres at the Kundang New Village border. In short time, hundreds of land turned into papaya plantations. In that time, Kundang New Village is called 'Selangor's Papaya Village'. This good condition did not last long. One of the reason is, the type of papaya planted there is from ordinary genes. It makes the selling prices low. Added with the price application by middleman makes those papaya can be sold at 8 cents per catty (1 catty = 600 grams). One more problem is tree diseases. Residents started to leave papaya plantation sector slowly and gradually in the 1990s. Now the history of the papaya plantation on its heyday at Kundang New Village is just a memory.

Kundang Industrial Park, a joint project of IGB and Selangor Economic Development Corporation, launched in 1992. The industrial park cover a total of 400 hectares with 180 hectares developed into industrial lots. It was expected to be completed in five years. Palm-Oleo Sdn Bhd opened its manufacturing factory at Kundang Industrial Park in April 1994.

== Neighborhood ==
Traditionally, Kundang refers to a village here. However, recent years saw some variation of certain neighborhood around Kundang. Now, Kundang may refers to the places below:

- Kampung Baru Kundang
- Kampung Melayu Sri Kundang
- Bandar Baru Kundang
- Taman Kundang Jaya
- Taman Desa Kundang
- Taman Rahmat Jaya

== Connectivity ==
Kundang is well-served by an excellent road network. This area is directly linked to Kuala Lumpur–Kuala Selangor Expressway (LATAR). The B149 Selangor State Road runs through this town, and connects with LATAR and B29 Kuang Road.

== Recreation ==
- Tasik Biru Kundang

This recreation lake is a haven to anglers especially who hunts for Toman fish (Ophicephalus micropeltes). The former Kundang Tin mine, encompassing of 80 acres of area is rich with this kind of fish. Some housing estate is also located here, such as Taman Tasik Biru (low cost and intermediate homes) and Laguna Biru (apartments). Homestays are available in Laguna Biru. People outside Kundang also have their weekend spend here. Some of Malay films and commercial adverts also being filmed here.

- Kundang Lakes Country Club

This basic 18-hole golf course was formed from a reclaimed land from the tin mining activity.
