= Bestari Jaya =

Town in Malaysia

Coordinates: 3°23′N 101°25′E

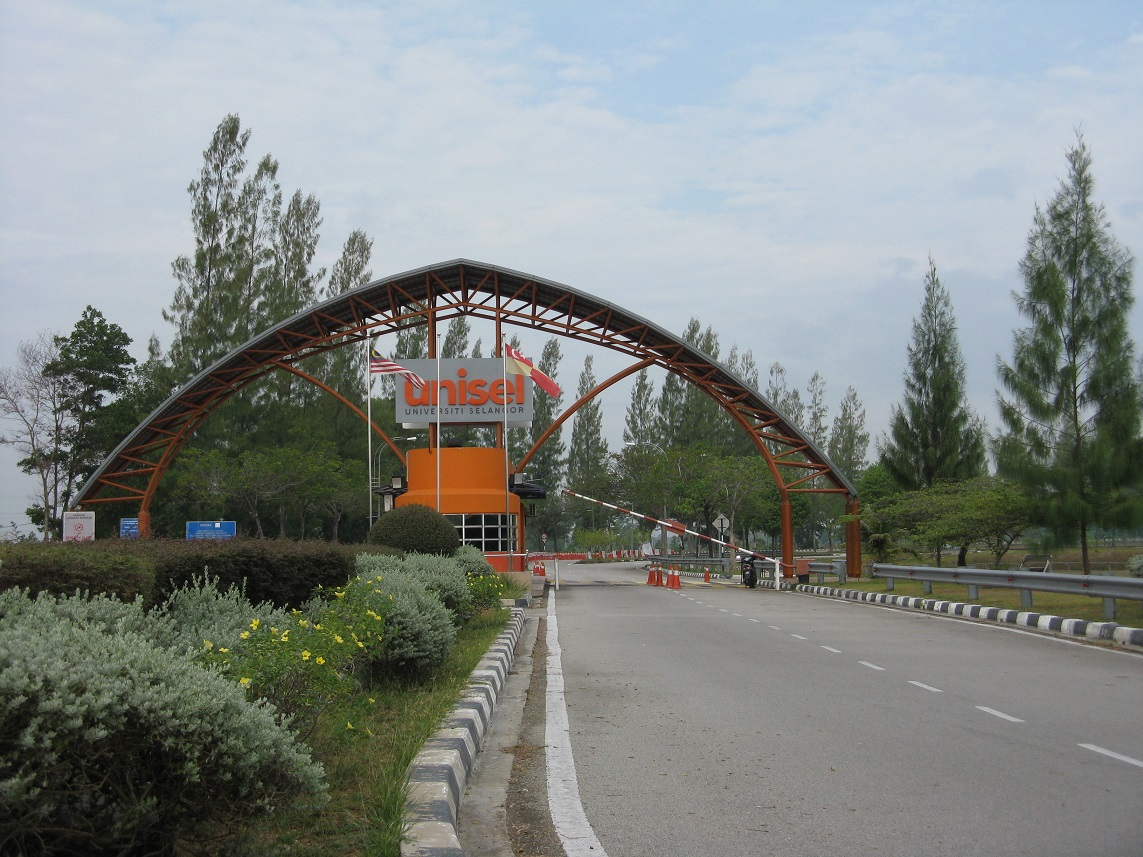
UNISEL - Universiti Selangor

Bestari Jaya in Kuala Selangor District

Bestari Jaya (formerly Batang Berjuntai) is a town and a mukim in Kuala Selangor District, Selangor, Malaysia. It is 40 km NW from Kuala Lumpur.

== History ==
=== Old name "Batang Berjuntai" ===
"Batang Berjuntai" means a dangling branch in Malay. There used to be a railway line connecting Batang Berjuntai with Batu Arang and onwards to the mainline of Malayan Railways at Kuang. The line between the town and Batu Arang was dismantled by the Japanese during World War II and never reconstructed.

=== New name "Bestari Jaya" ===
In 2007 the name Batang Berjuntai was renamed "Bestari Jaya" despite local resistance, as someone in authority rather mistakenly felt that "batang berjuntai" had phallic connotations (batang is Malay slang for "penis", and berjuntai translate directly as "dangle"). In fact the name referred to a literal "dangling branch" that was seen there when the town was first established; it was named by the resident British administrator.

Many locals continue to use the old name, and outsiders unaware of the name change are often confused by the new signage.

== Education ==
- Sekolah Kebangsaan Bestari Jaya
- Sekolah Kebangsaan Jaya Setia
- SJK (Tamil) Bestari Jaya
- SJK (Cina) Yuk Chih
- SMK Sultan Sulaiman Shah (4S)
- Sekolah Menengah Kebangsaan Raja Muda Musa (SMKRMM)
- Kolej Vokasional Kuala Selangor formerly (SM Teknik Kuala Selangor)
- Universiti Selangor (UNISEL)

== Transportation ==
The township is served by only two buses:

- Route 107 by Selangor Omnibus, connecting Bestari Jaya to Masjid Jamek in downtown Kuala Lumpur, via MRT/KTM Sungai Buloh, KTM Kepong Sentral, Sentul, Chow Kit and Jalan Tuanku Abdul Rahman (LRT Bandaraya/Sogo);
- Route 105 by Wawasan Sutera, connecting to Kuala Selangor town.
