= Kuang (town) =

Town in Gombak, Selangor, Malaysia

Coordinates: 3°15′N 101°33′E

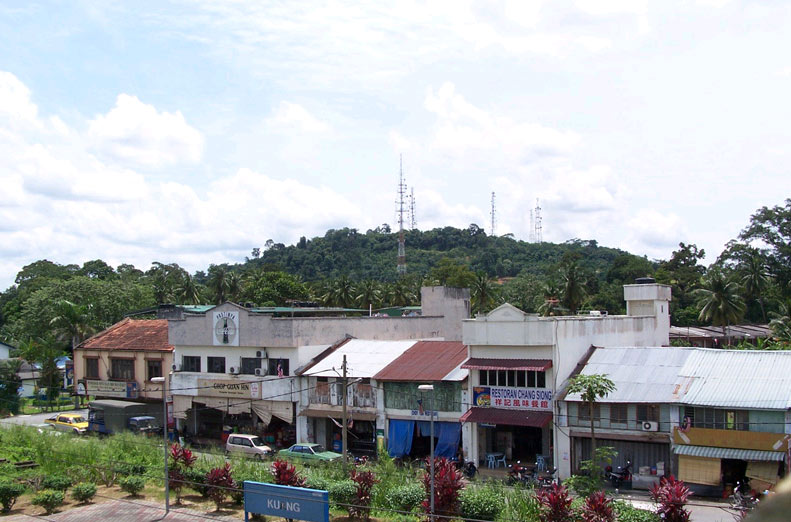
Kuang town with Bukit Tadun in the background, October 2006

Kuang in Gombak District

Kuang (Jawi: كواڠ; Chinese: 轟埠) is a town in Gombak District, Selangor, Malaysia. Its main importance in older times was the starting of the railway branch to Batu Arang from the mainline of Malayan Railways. Today, Kuang's main industry is cement distribution for the CIMA Company. There is a successful HS Nada cow farm at Kampung Gombak.

Kuang has one of the largest polo field in Asia. It was an important venue for polo during the Commonwealth Games in 1998. There is also a lake called Tasik Biru (Blue Lake), which is at Seri Kundang.

The Malaysia Bible Seminary is also in Kuang.

Kuang's calm and peaceful surrounding attracts some non-locals to build their homes and recreation centres here, near Kampung Sungai Serai.

== Transportation ==
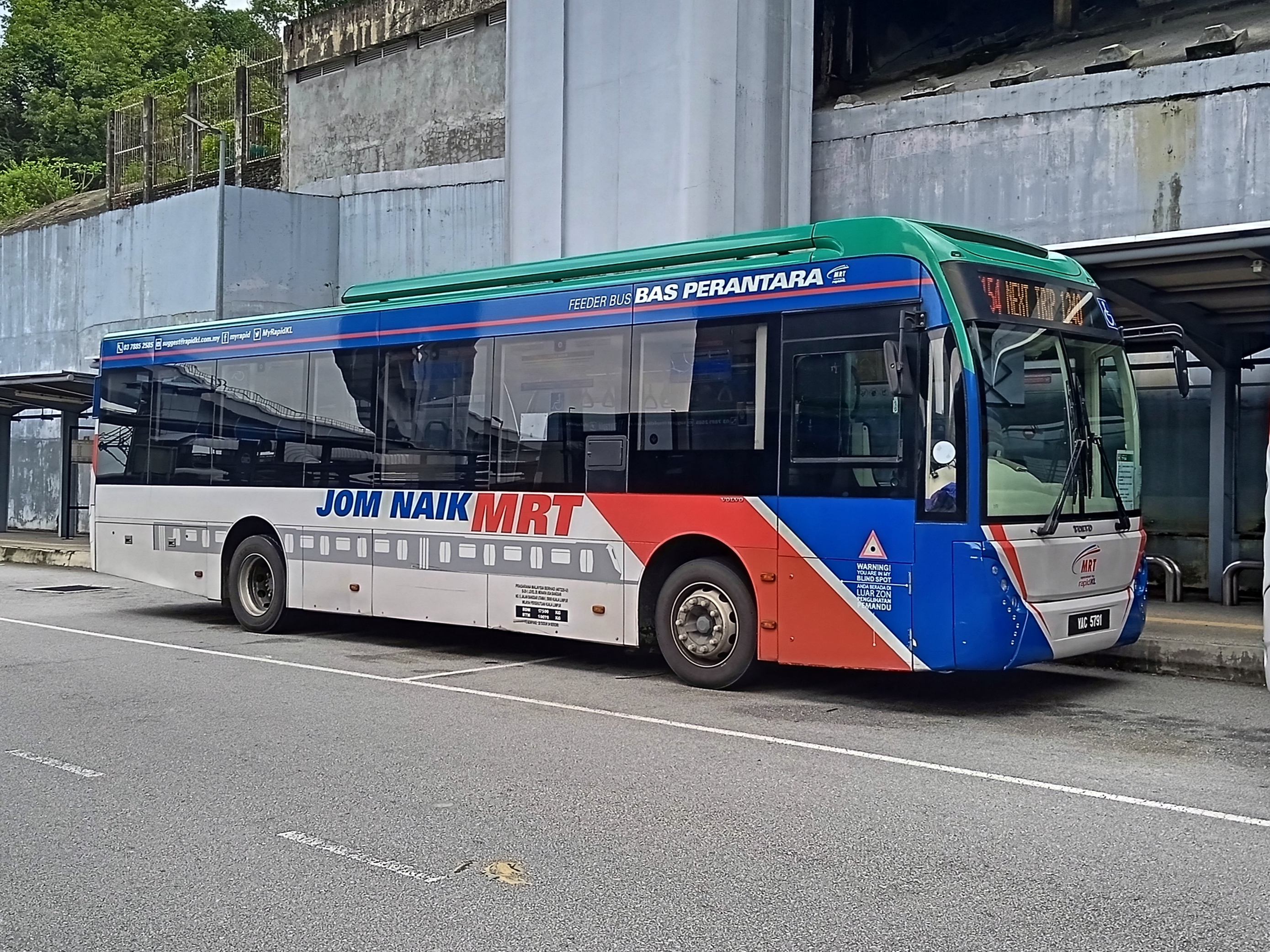
Rapid KL bus route T154, 2023.

The town is served by Kuang Komuter station.

The area is accessible by Rapid KL MRT feeder bus (Bas Perantara MRT) route T154 from Sungai Buloh MRT station.
