= Batu Arang =

Town in Gombak, Selangor, Malaysia

- Town

Other transcription(s)
  - Malay: Batu Arang
  - Jawi: باتو ارڠ
  - Chinese: 煤炭山 (Simplified) 煤炭山 (Traditional)
  - Japanese: バトゥアラン
  - Tamil: பத்து ஆராங்
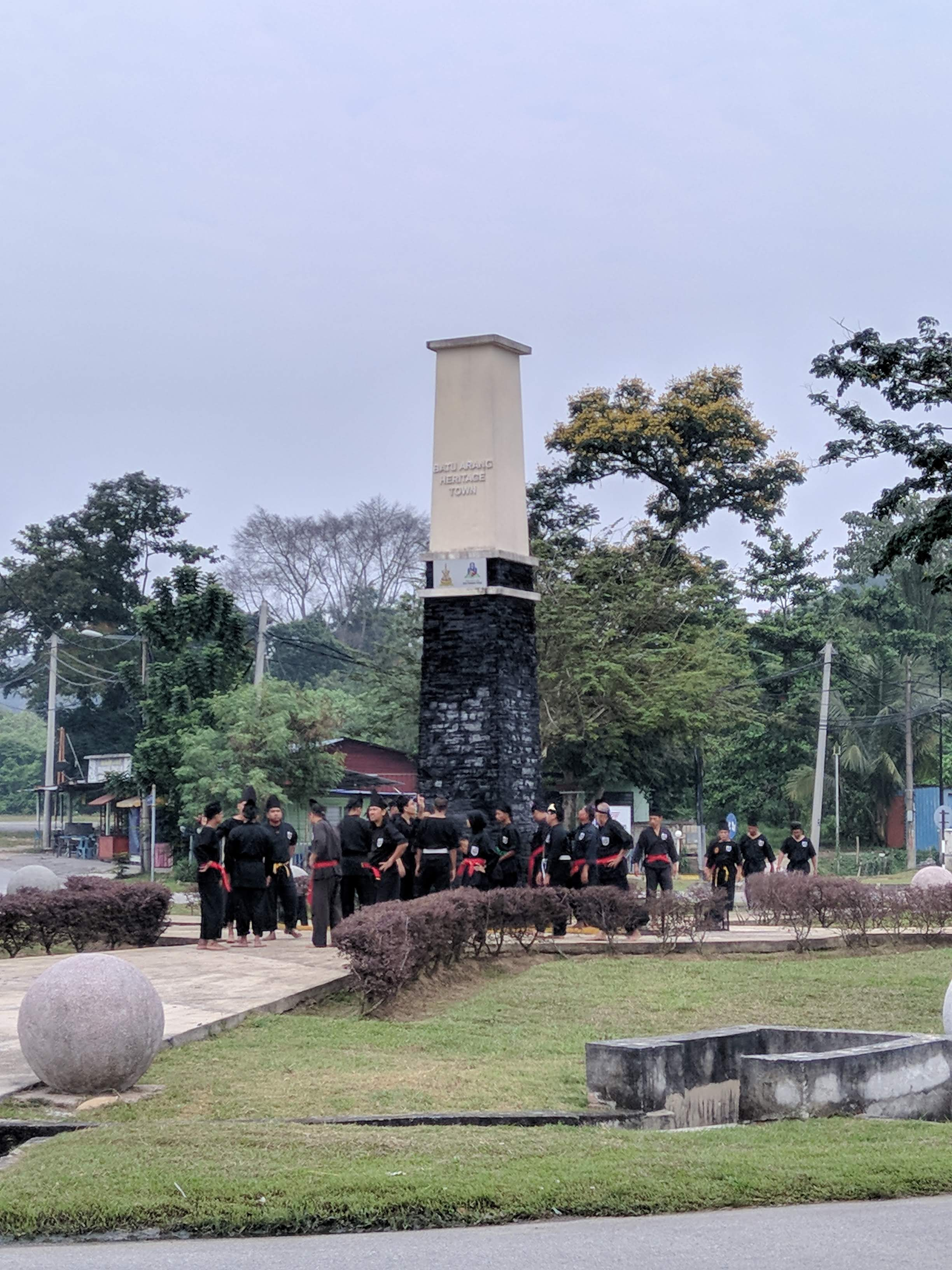
- A monument regarding heritage town status on a roundabout
- Etymology: Malay: Batu Arang ("stone coal")
- Batu Arang in Gombak District

- Location within Malaysia Location within Selangor
- Coordinates: 3°19′02.7″N 101°28′17.6″E
- Country: Malaysia
- State: Selangor Darul Ehsan
- District: Gombak District
- Founded: 1911
- Granted heritage town status: 2011

Area
  - Total: 3,600 ha (9,000 acres)
  - Rural: 810 ha (2,000 acres)
- Time zone: UTC+08:00 (MST)
- Postcode: 48100
- Telephone area code: +6-03

Batu Arang is a town in Gombak District, Selangor, Malaysia, that is located about 50 km (31 miles) from the capital Kuala Lumpur. Coal was first discovered in the region in 1908, when British authorities found large deposits of coal reserves that could be commercially viable and fuel a railway system. The town was established when the British started mining operations. In 1915, a railway system linking Batu Arang and Kuang was built to transport coal to the rest of the country. As coal output and demand increased, rail services to and from Kuala Lumpur expanded. The demand for coal from Batu Arang skyrocketed due to the First World War, which led to a reduction of coal imports. The local coal was frequently sold to the railway companies, power stations, tin mines, dredges, and end customers.

During World War II, in 1942, British authorities halted mining operations, and destroyed the power station and main sub-station as Japanese forces approached Batu Arang. When the Japanese occupied the area, they repaired the damaged equipment and hired more people to mine coal. Their mining methods, however, have left a devastating effect on the coal mine because they only focused on surface mining. When Japan surrendered at the end of World War II, Malayan Collieries resumed mining but were faced with problems such as improper mining methods by Japanese, delayed delivery for new equipment, labor strikes, fire, floods, increasing costs, rising coal prices and competition from petroleum, which is a cheaper and more attractive fuel. These problems led to the permanent closure of the coal mine on January 30, 1960.

After the closure of the mine, many miners and workers moved out of town and many buildings became ruins, the coal mine filled with water, land faced soil erosion, and the railway line from Kuang was dismantled, effectively ended railway service in Batu Arang. Despite this, some residents remained in the town and shops, facilities, and amenities continue to operate. On October 16, 2011, the town celebrated 100 years since its establishment and was granted heritage town status to boost economic prospects of its residents and make it one of the most important tourist attractions in Selangor.

== History ==
=== British Malaya era ===
Coal was first discovered in Malaya in 1908 by Haji Abdul Hadi, a Malay man who was looking for tin near Rawang in Ulu Selangor. Samples were sent to the Inspector of Mines at Kuala Kubu, who forwarded them to the Federated Malay States Geological Survey Department, which sent a geologist to investigate the location of discovery and discovered there are large deposits of coal in this location. There was strong demand in Federated Malay States Railway (FMSR)—especially the tin mining activity—to open up the country to private enterprise. Several interested parties bade for the coal-mining tender. John Archibald Russell initially tried to bid for mining activity under his firm J. A. Russell and Co. but the bid was awarded to Rawang Federated Malay States Coal Syndicate Ltd instead. The company start mining the coal using a diamond drill and hand boring tools but two years later, the company started to lose interest in Batu Arang after discovering the mine has no commercial value. The company then sold the mining concession to John Archibald Russell in 1913. In the same year, however, the price of rubber decreased globally and many people who had been considering buying shares in rubber starting to lose interest. As a result, Russell had to sell some of his past investments and become a major shareholder of Malayan Collieries Limited with help from his associates on June 20, 1914. Malayan Collieries then appointed J. A. Russell and Co. to become general managers and secretaries, and his company issued $1,500,000 worth of capital, in which $500,000 was the working capital, where it was formed on a basis of coal deposits which estimated to be between 10 and 20 million tons of coal and the coal demand was estimated to be around 200,000 tons per year.

The company leased 9,000 acres (3,600 ha) of coal deposits, of which 2,000 acres (810 ha) were used for surface plant and miners' housing. Mining machinery was ordered from the United Kingdom and the United States. The village then established to serve the coal mining industry, was named "Batu Arang" from the Malay word meaning "stone charcoal". The company hired mining engineer T. C. McCall to manage the mining operations. Federated Malay States Railway then agreed to build an additional railway line that spanned 7 mi (11 km) from Kuang to Batu Arang; the new line cost $1 million and was opened to traffic in 1915. The railway company also sold a locomotive designed for shunting to the mining company. In return, the mining company agreed to pay the construction costs of the sidings from Batu Arang station to the pit head. Initially, only one train ran daily between Batu Arang and Kuala Lumpur but the frequency increased as output and demand for coal grew. The mining company also built the road that links the trunk road to the mining area. Bullock carts were used to carry mining equipment and stores to the mining area. The bullock cart was previously used to carry coal to local customers.

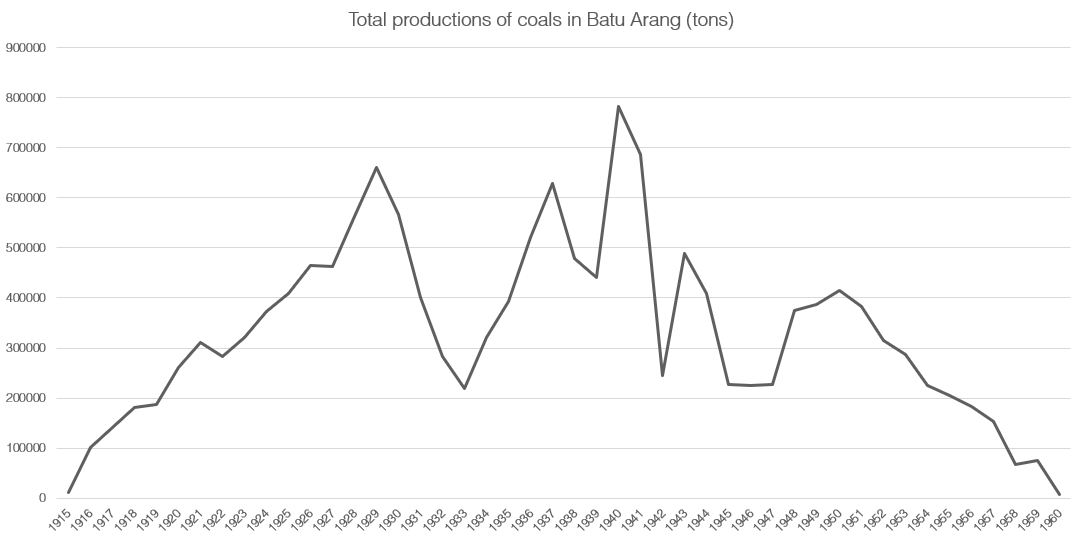
Total production of coals in tons from 1915 until closure in 1960

The initial output was low; the mine produced an average of 60 tons of coal per day due to it being mined on a small scale and low demand; imported coal was readily available. Most of the coal was used for the colliery's consumption and in 1916, coal from Batu Arang was supplied to two of the largest European tin mines in Malaya. The price of coal was relatively low; it sold at $5 per ton at Batu Arang station. During the First World War, the demand for Batu Arang coal soared as coal imports decreased and then stopped; thereafter, the mining company build new sidings to deal with renewed demand. As of 1939, the mining company conveyed coal and other products to the FSMR system by operating 17 miles (27 km) of railway on its property. The main customers for Batu Arang coal were railways, power stations and tin mines, where in 1937, 700 tons of coal were sold to tin dredges, which was followed by the Perak River Hydro-Electric Company (500 tons), FMSR (450 tons), Bangsar Power Station (200 tons) and end customers (150 tons). Thus Batu Arang played an important role in the Malayan economy by introducing electricity to the Malayan state and improving tin mining through dredges, which outpaced Asian methods of mining tin. Coal production peaked in 1940, when Batu Arang produced 781,509 tons of coal.

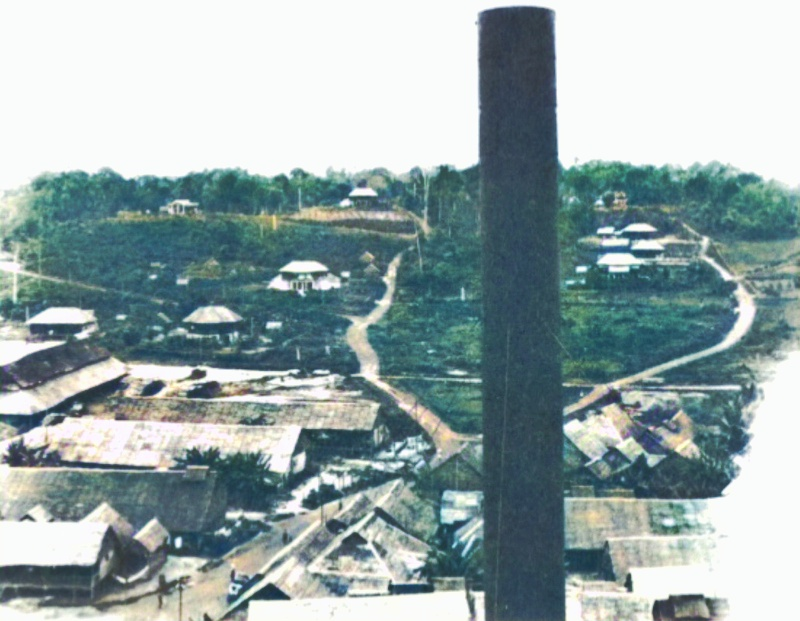
Batu Arang in 1924

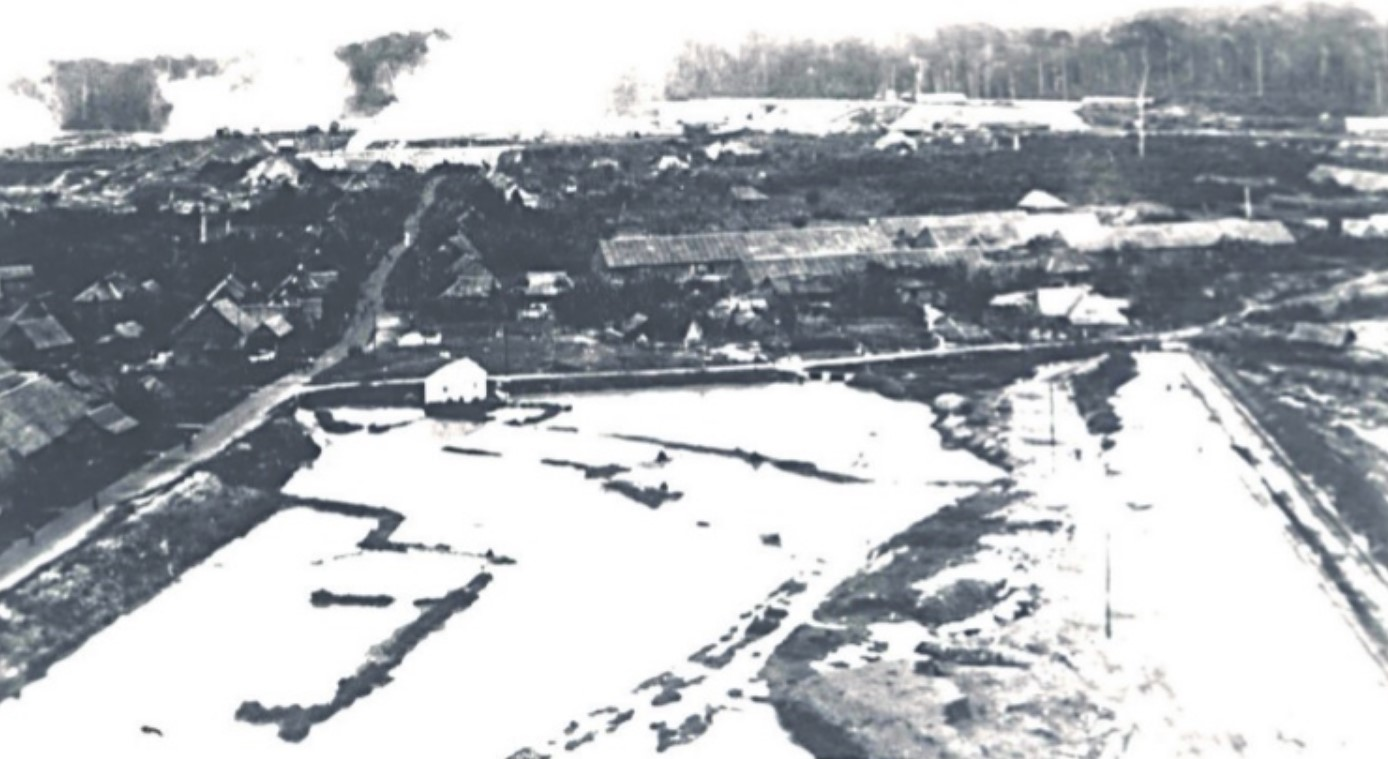
Batu Arang in 1933

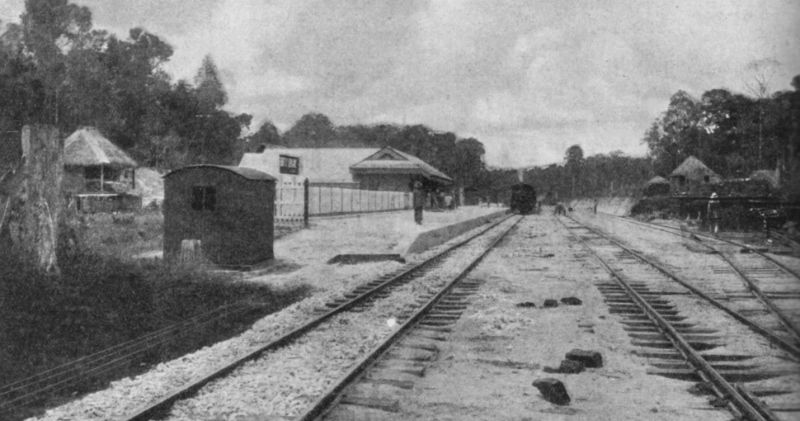
Batu Arang railway station circa 1918. The station and its railway line was demolished in 1971.

=== World War II and decline ===
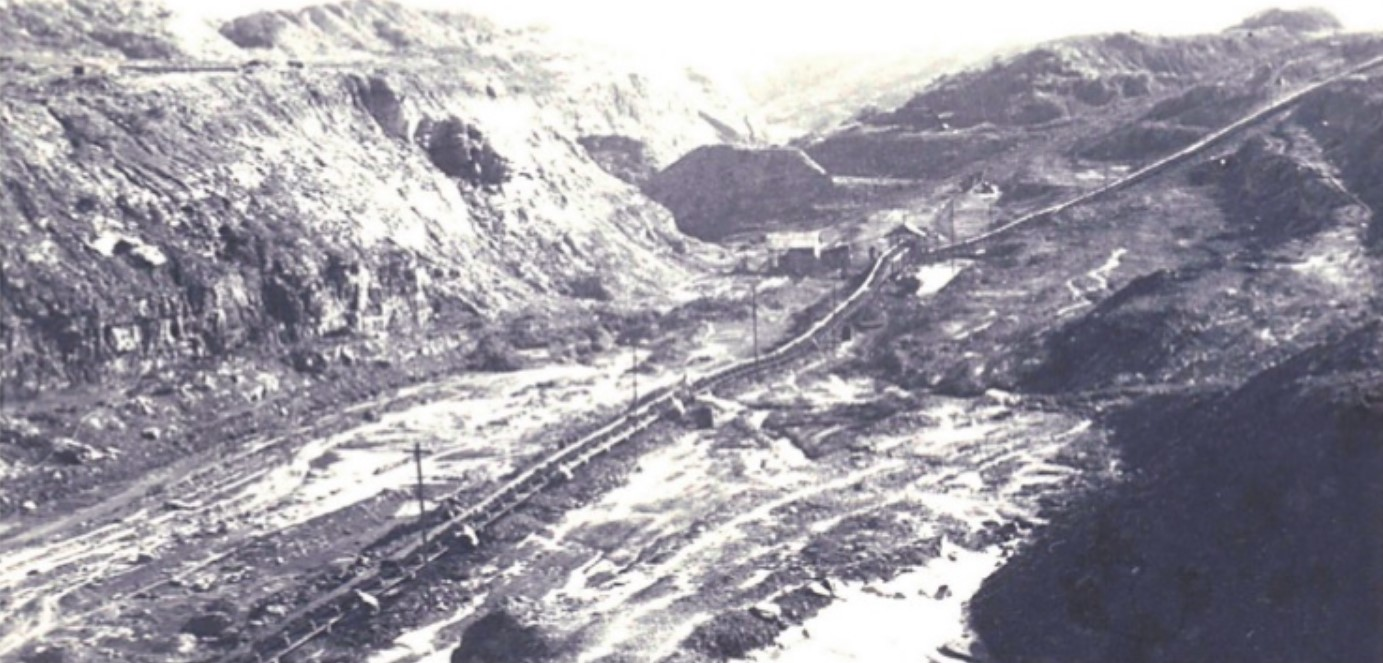
Batu Arang surface coal mine in 1949.

During World War II, the colonial official advised the mining company to evacuate Batu Arang on January 5, 1942; the mine's machinery was halted, and stores and portable equipment were handed over to the military and FMSR to be transported to Singapore by rail. The military then used explosives to destroy the power station and its main sub-station. The parent company J. A. Russell and Co. continued to operate in Kuala Lumpur until January 9, 1942, when they fled with their records to Singapore to establish emergency offices and continued to do business there. Once Japanese forces reached Singapore, the company attempted to send all records and equipment to Australia, and open an office there, but the ship conveying them sank on its way to Australia. In Japanese-occupied Malaya, the Japanese hired many men to repair the damaged equipment at Batu Arang and continue mining activity. The resumed mining activity allowed the Japanese army to operate tin mines and run the railway system, allowing them to continue producing and exporting raw minerals from Malaya. Unlike the previous company, which focused on a balance between surface mining and underground mining, the Japanese only mined coal on the surface, which would affect future mining operations due to high operational costs. Prior to their surrender, the Japanese had mined 1,369,834 tons of coal.

On September 11, 1945, the British Military Administration took over properties belonging to Malayan Collieries with Indian troops to manage the mine. The Malayan Union government then backed Malayan Collieries from April 1, 1946, until June 30, 1946, when all the properties were returned to the company, which faced several problems that would hamper its coal mining activity. Labor strikes in November 1946 and January 1947 caused the Malayan Government to take over the company under emergency legislation. The shipment of new machinery was delayed and the restoration of coal mining was slowed down by the poor mining methods which had been used by the Japanese, and was further exacerbated by fire and floods in the coal mine. The company could not meet the demand for coal and the increasing operation costs coupled with the rising prices of coal from $12.50 per ton in 1946 to $35.00 per ton in 1959 caused many customers to abandon coal for petroleum. In 1954, the government of Malaya hired a consulting firm, Messrs Powell Duffryn Technical Services Limited, to investigate the future of Malayan coal; the firm concluded it was not feasible to proceed with coal mining activity due to high costs and inability to compete with petroleum. The Batu Arang mine was permanently closed on January 30, 1960. By this time, the mine had produced over 14,000,000 tons of coal.

=== Malayan Emergency ===
Batu Arang was a conflict zone during the Malayan Emergency period, and the Communist Party of Malaya occupied the town. The attempted communist occupation of Batu Arang caused British authorities to declare it a "Black Area" until 1960 because it became a base for the communist insurgents: the hills and valleys around the town provided ideal hiding places for the communists, who could quickly launch small-scale attacks from the area. On July 12, 1948, the communist group seized the coal mine, occupied it for an hour, damaged mining equipment and killed five Chinese people before leaving the mine. The attack on the coal mine raised tensions during the initial period of the Malayan Emergency; there was a shortages of troops in the country to protect residents and to combat the communists. Eight days later, twenty people had been arrested in relation with the coal mine attack. Then on July 30, 1948, police and troops killed 22 members and arrested 47 members in their forest hideouts. The communists then derailed a train in Batu Arang on January 25, 1949. The air force launched an attack against communist guerrillas on July 20, 1949. A reward of $2,000 was offered for the capture of Chong Hoy Fong, who was wanted for the terrorist attack; Chong was killed by Scots Guards on January 16, 1950. The police later raided the Indian clubhouse and confiscated communist items such as flags, caps, photographs of communist leaders, posters and documents on April 27, 1950. This incident caused the closure of 25 shops under emergency regulations on January 25, 1952.

=== Contemporary era ===
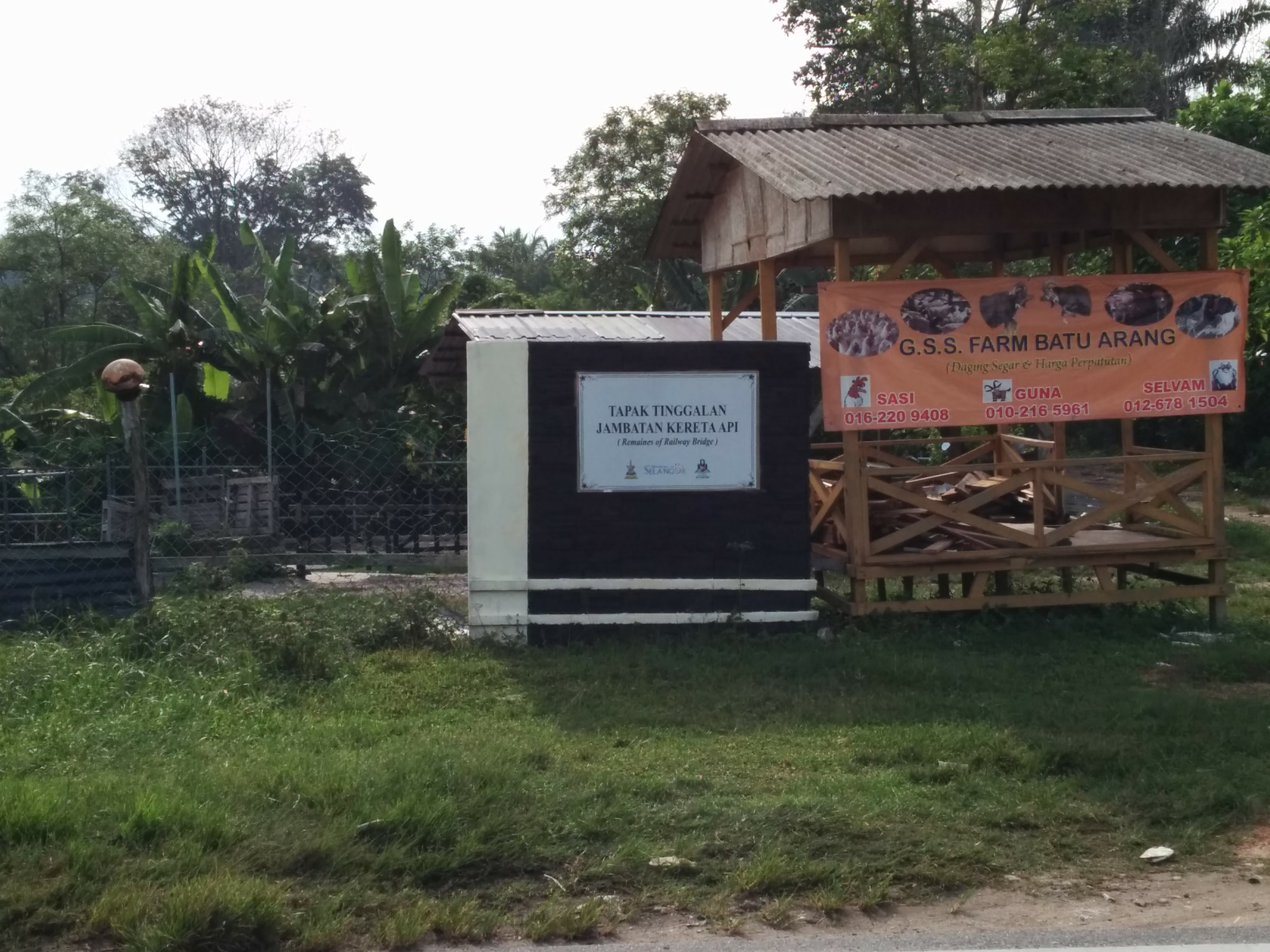
The plaque that marks the remnants of railway bridge since the dismantlement in 1971.

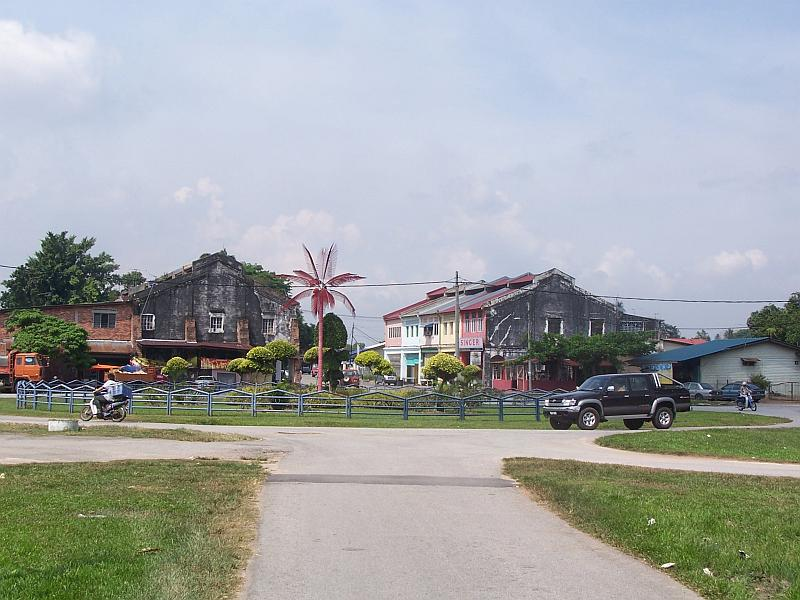
Batu Arang in May 2007

Since the closure of the coal mine, many miners and workers have moved out of Batu Arang and many of the town's buildings have been left to decay. Some of these buildings are scheduled to be demolished because they are unsafe for occupation or were built over cavities and old mining tunnels. The surface mining area filled with water and is subject to erosion caused by dripping water tables from mining activities. Although many traces of the area's mining past have disappeared, some structures are still visible, although some chimneys have trees growing in them. The railway track from Kuang to Batu Arang was removed in 1971, ending railway service in Batu Arang. Despite this, many local shops, restaurants, wet markets and other facilities continue to operate and the town now has a multicultural population made up mostly of people with Chinese, Malay and Indian backgrounds.

An underground coal-seam fire occurred on September 18, 2011; one family discovered the land behind their house was getting hotter for two weeks before thick, black smoke started emitting from the ground. The fire was extinguished but the family were displaced and that area is deemed to be no longer safe for occupation.

In 2011, as the 100th anniversary of Batu Arang's establishment approached, many residents appealed to authorities to give the town heritage status, citing the development of nearby towns such as Bandar Tasik Puteri and Bandar Kota Puteri, which was rapid and left Batu Arang town behind in terms of recent developments. They also urged that the town and its buildings be preserved to attract tourists, suggesting old buildings such as the police station, brick factory, mine shafts and town hall be renovated and maintained for future generations. In addition, they suggested the abandoned mines be converted for other purposes such as water sports and fishing. On October 16, 2011, during a carnival to celebrate the town's 100th anniversary, Selangor's head of government Khalid Ibrahim awarded heritage town status to Batu Arang to increase the economic prospects of its residents and to make it a tourist attraction, Despite this recognition, it was later reported by Sin Chew Daily that due to lack of local humanity cultivation and support from mapping companies, the development of Batu Arang as a tourism area had slowed; this was further exacerbated by Khalid Ibrahim's decision to move to Port Klang to contest the 2013 Malaysian general election.

The 0.6 ha (1.5 acres) Christian cemetery in Batu Arang, where foreigners had buried their dead since 2011, has become controversial due to the illegal burial of foreigners, usually of Asian origin, including Vietnamese, Thai and Cambodian, without burial permits and documents; these burials occurred at night, which caught the attention of the cemetery coordinator and reported to police several times, claiming the cemetery is intended for the burial of local people only. These claims were later supported by Gombak district officer Datuk Nor Hisham Ahmad Dahlan, who was told the illegal burial service costs RM 5,000 per session and would launch the investigation into this matter. The Christian cemetery was officially gazette by Gombak authorities on September 25, 2014, and any foreigners who wanted to bury their dead must first obtain permission from Batu Arang police department before doing so.

On April 9, 2018, a century-old chimney previously belonging to a defunct brick company was demolished after being abandoned by the company and overgrown with trees. The land it stood on was later acquired by a private owner, who plan to demolish the century-old brick factory building, including the chimney. The chimney's demolition shocked the residents and complaints were filed to the Batu Arang branch of the Malaysian Chinese Association, which led to the suspension of the demolition of the factory building. It was later discovered the chimney and the brick factory were not gazette as a Batu Arang heritage site because the previous land owner had yet to sign an agreement with state government. The private owner stated he demolished the chimney because of safety concerns; the chimney itself has fallen into despair and he was planning to rebuild a replica of it.

== Geography ==
=== Climate ===
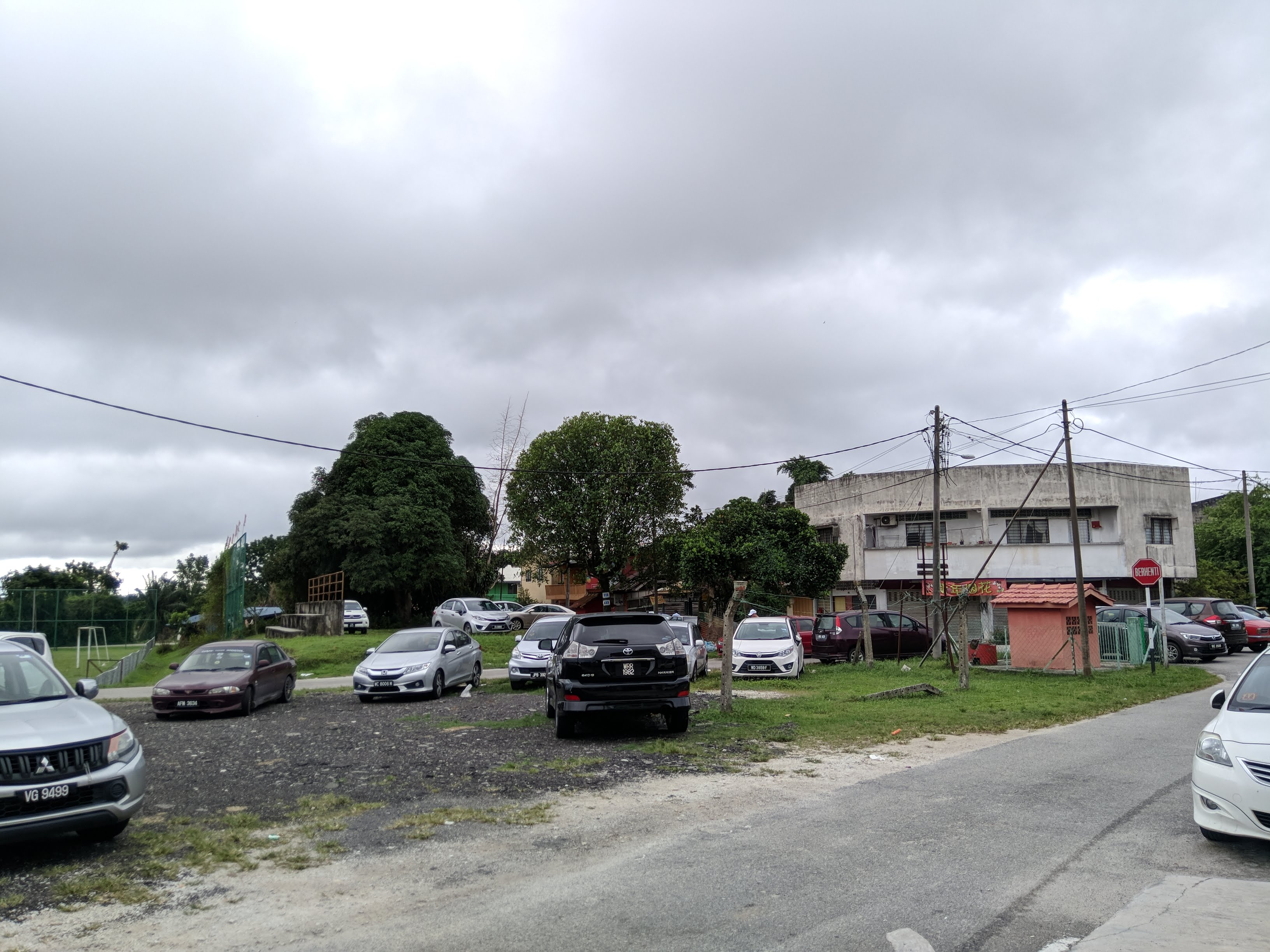
Cloudy in Batu Arang

Batu Arang's climate is classified as tropical. Rainfall in the area is quite significant throughout the year. This climate is Af according to the Köppen-Geiger climate classification. The temperature here averages 27.1 °C (80.8 °F). The average annual rainfall is 2,549 mm (100.4 in). Precipitation is lowest in July, with an average of 126 mm (5.0 in). The average for November—the wettest month—is 301 mm (11.9 in). At an average temperature of 27.7 °C (81.9 °F), May is the hottest month of the year. The coolest month is January, with an average temperature of 26.5 °C (79.7 °F). Between the driest and wettest months, the difference in precipitation is 175 mm (6.9 in).

Climate data for Batu Arang
Month	Jan	Feb	Mar	Apr	May	Jun	Jul	Aug	Sep	Oct	Nov	Dec	Year
Mean daily maximum °C (°F)	31.5 (88.7)	32.2 (90.0)	32.7 (90.9)	32.5 (90.5)	32.5 (90.5)	32.4 (90.3)	32.2 (90.0)	32.1 (89.8)	31.7 (89.1)	31.7 (89.1)	31.2 (88.2)	31.3 (88.3)	32.0 (89.6)
Daily mean °C (°F)	26.5 (79.7)	27.1 (80.8)	27.4 (81.3)	27.6 (81.7)	27.7 (81.9)	27.6 (81.7)	27.3 (81.1)	27.2 (81.0)	27 (81)	27 (81)	26.7 (80.1)	26.6 (79.9)	27.1 (80.9)
Mean daily minimum °C (°F)	21.6 (70.9)	22.1 (71.8)	22.1 (71.8)	22.7 (72.9)	22.9 (73.2)	22.8 (73.0)	22.4 (72.3)	22.3 (72.1)	22.3 (72.1)	22.4 (72.3)	22.3 (72.1)	21.9 (71.4)	22.3 (72.2)
Average precipitation mm (inches)	186 (7.3)	158 (6.2)	252 (9.9)	257 (10.1)	217 (8.5)	128 (5.0)	126 (5.0)	167 (6.6)	218 (8.6)	290 (11.4)	301 (11.9)	249 (9.8)	2,549 (100.3)
Average relative humidity (%)	80	78	80	82	80	79	79	79	80	82	84	83	81
Source 1: climate-data.org
Source 2: timeanddate.com

=== Environmental issues ===
Illegal dumping of materials containing toxic waste was discovered on January 15, 2004, and a lawsuit was filed against the responsible parties. Among the toxic materials found were paint, glues and chemicals that are used in the construction industry. Four years later, another waste-dumping issue was discovered when two contractors dumped waste collected from a sewerage processing plant in Puchong into their palm oil estate in Batu Arang and left it to dry and become fertilizer. The waste generated strong odors that affected the lives of the town's residents.

Since 2010, flooding has frequently occurred on an annual basis in some parts of town, especially the roundabout, which cut off access to schools, the police station and the fire station. It was caused by the aging drainage system, which had fallen into despair. More complains were filed by residents in 2019. To mitigate the flooding problem, a new drainage system was constructed in February 2020, and was completed in April 2020.

== Transportation ==
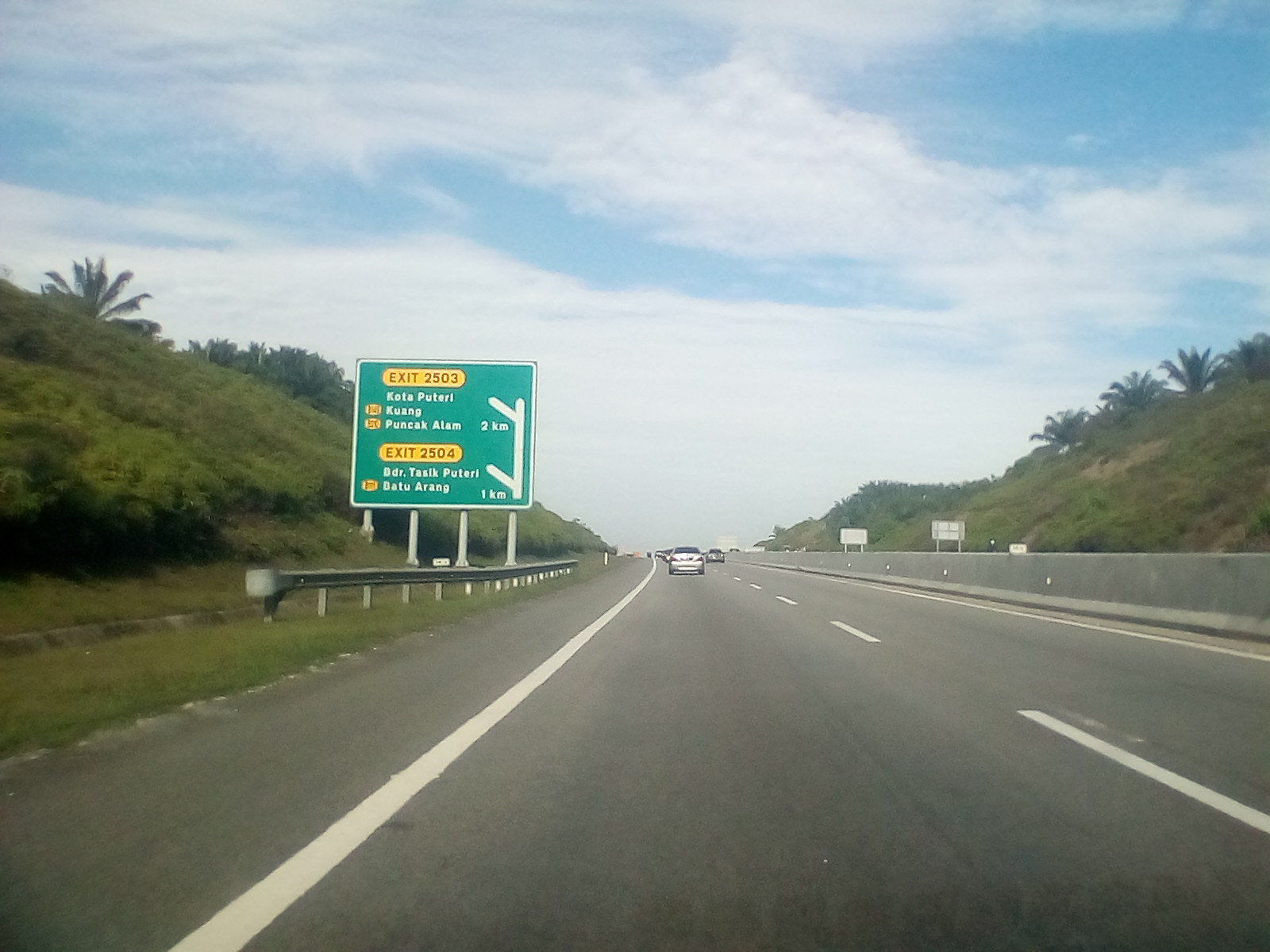
Interchange in Kuala Lumpur–Kuala Selangor Expressway

Batu Arang is accessible via several roads that link Batu Arang with Bandar Tasik Puteri and Kampung Baru Kundang, Kundang and Rawang. Railway services to the town were ended in 1971. In 2019, public transportation was again provided with a free bus service known as Bus Smart Selangor MPS3 Route; the 31.3 km (19.4 miles) line runs from SK Batu Arang school to Sungai Buloh KTM – MRT railway station. Bicycle use in this town is widespread for both residents as utility cycling and non-residents who cycle for recreation, and the old bicycle shop in the town continues to operate.

== Health ==
A public clinic in Batu Arang was opened by the government in 1970 to provide medical services to Batu Arang residents. Residents can also access the clinics and hospitals in Kundang and Sungai Buloh via the free bus service provided by Smart Selangor, which stops at these medical facilities since the introduction of these new stations in June 2019.

Batu Arang houses a Welcome Community Home, a rehabilitation center for drug addicts and HIV / AIDS patients, which previously operated in Kuala Lumpur in 1997 and moved to Batu Arang in 1998, where it occupies a former poultry farm. As of 2006, the rehabilitation center has housed 600 persons since 1997. In addition, there is an orphanage in Batu Arang that houses children who are affected by HIV / AIDS and have suffered from social stigma; these children were denied access to education and were unable to open bank accounts, which led to them being unbanked and unable to obtain a Malaysian identity card, making them stateless and unemployed.

== Sports ==
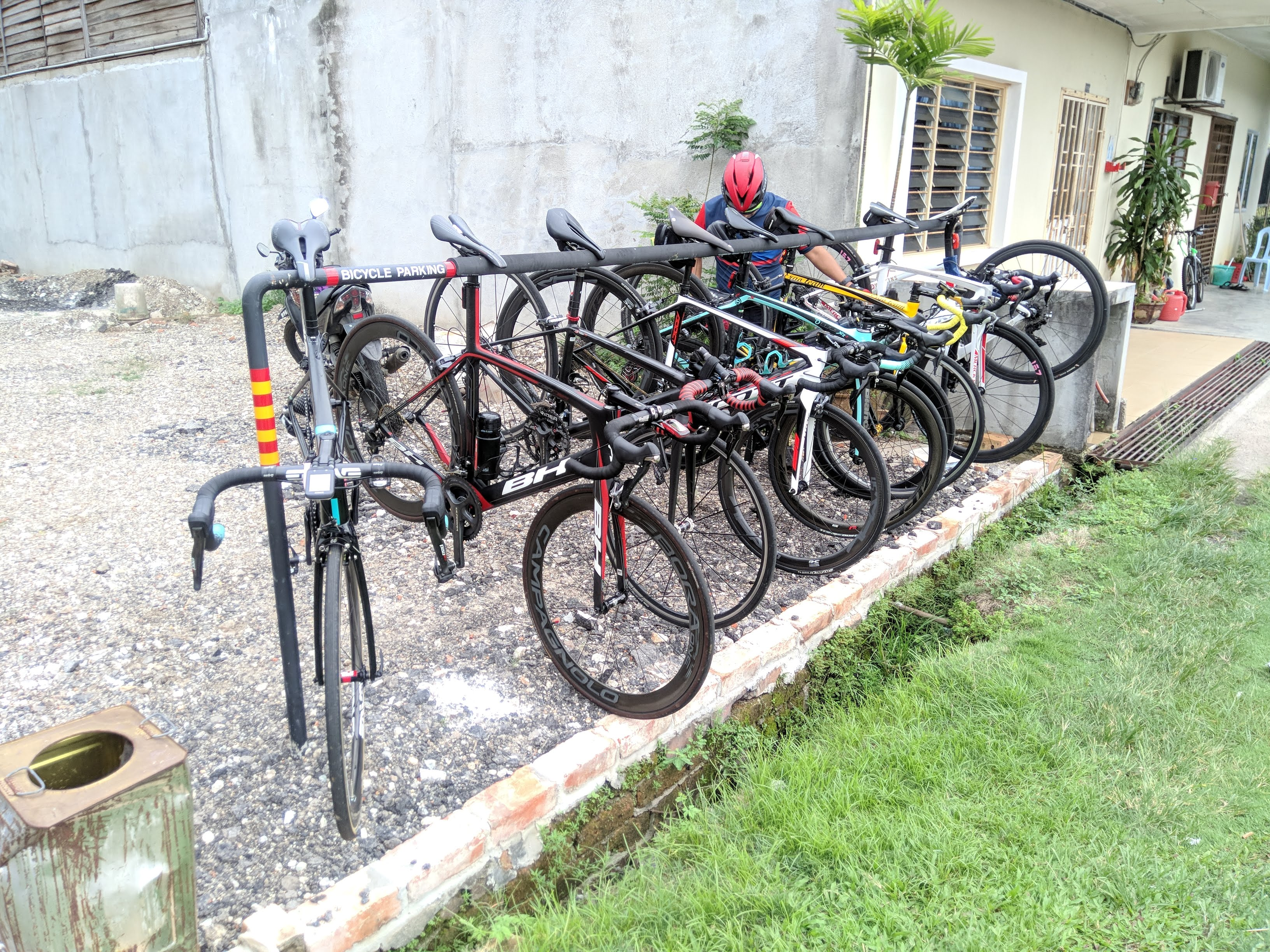
Road bike stacked in a bicycle parking

After the town's foundation, two separate sporting facilities were built for different demographics. A sports center known as the Asiatic Sports Club was designed for Asian residents; this had a badminton court, and soccer and cricket fields. This sports center was closed and the building has housed the Malaysian Chinese Association (MCA) center since the 1960s. The soccer field remains intact and continues to operate today, in addition to the nearby basketball court. A separate clubhouse catered for European residents; this was known as the European Club. The clubhouse provided facilities for billiards, table tennis, lawn tennis, dancing and swimming. The clubhouse was closed in the 1970s and the building has been converted into a residential house.

Batu Arang has become the venue for several cycling activities and the town has become popular among cyclists, who perceive it as an ideal place for cycling. The routes are suitable for beginners, with little traffic, clean air, good relationship between cyclists and drivers, and a cuisine haven. Residents of Batu Arang often show a warm welcome to visitors to their town. Most of the riders comes from Shah Alam, Kuala Selangor, Ijok and Rawang. Several international professional racing and UCI-sanctioned cycling events, including the Tour de Langkawi and the Jelajah Malaysia, have been held in the town, where cyclists passed through it. Residents also organize cycling events to attract local cyclists and bring more attention to the heritage value of the town. Trail running events such as Deuter International Trail Run, which attracts 3,000 runners, have been held in Batu Arang. Some residents of Batu Arang also practice equestrianism and Silat.

== Films ==
Several Chinese New Year films have been filmed in Batu Arang. A 2018 film, A House of Happiness, was filmed in March 2017 for 13 days. Fight Lah! Kopitiam was filmed in Batu Arang in 2019 and was released in 2020. The red lanterns that were used during filming were the only items that remain in the filming location.
