= Selangor State Route B55 =

Road in Malaysia

Selangor Route 55
- Jalan Sungai Air Tawar

Major junctions
- North end: Sungai Air Tawar
- FT 5 Federal Route 5 B53 Jalan Bagan Terap; B46 Jalan Parit Baru; B46 Jalan Sungai Tengar; A123 State Route A123
- Southeast end: Kampung Tebok Pulai

Location
- Country: Malaysia
- Primary destinations: Sungai Air Tawar, Bagan Nakhoda Omar

Highway system
- Highways in Malaysia; Expressways; Federal; State

Selangor State Route B55, Jalan Sungai Air Tawar is a major road in Selangor, Malaysia. It is also a main route to Bagan Nakhoda Omar. There are many parit (canals) and villages along this road.

== History ==
The 2.80 km (1.74 mi) new bridge crossing Bernam River connecting from Sungai Air Tawar, Selangor to Parit 17, Hutan Melintang, Perak, with an allocation of RM220 million built from 25 August 2022, expected completed on 7 December 2026. Due to the several technical reasons, the expected date extend to September 2027.

On 30 April 2026, the Sungai Air Tawar–Hutan Melintang Bridge project reached 1 million working hours without major incident (LTI).

== Features ==
- Sungai Air Tawar–Hutan Melintang Bridge (under construction)
- many parit (canals) and villages along this road

== Junction lists ==
Legend:

- I/C - Interchange, I/S - Intersection, RSA - Rest and service area, OBR - Overhead bridge restaurant, R/R - Restaurant and rest plaza, L/B - Layby, V/P - Vista point, TN - tunnel, T/P - Toll plaza, BR - Bridge
- C - Cloverleaf, S - Stack, T-A - Trumpet-A, T-B - Trumpet-B, DT - Directional-T/Y, SDT - Semi-Directional-T/Y, P-Y - Partial-Y, D - Diamond, P-C - Partial cloverleaf, D-D - Diverging diamond, D-R - Direct ramp

State	District	Location	km	mi	Name	Destinations	Notes
Selangor	Sabak Bernam	Sabak			Kampung Tebok Pulai	FT 5 Malaysia Federal Route 5 – Teluk Intan, Bagan Datuk, Sabak, Kuala Selangor, Tanjung Karang, Sekinchan; Jalan Angkasa	Diamond interchange
Selangor	Sabak Bernam	Sabak			Zon IKS Sabak Bernam		
Selangor	Sabak Bernam	Sabak			Kampung Batu Tiga Puluh Darat	B53 Jalan Bagan Terap – Sabak, Sekendi	Junctions
Selangor	Sabak Bernam	Sabak			Kampung Banting		
Selangor	Sabak Bernam	Sabak			Kampung Tebuk Jawa		
Selangor	Sabak Bernam	Bagan Nakhoda Omar			Taman Seri Nakhoda		
Selangor	Sabak Bernam	Bagan Nakhoda Omar			Bagan Nakhoda Omar	Bagan Nakhoda Omar Recreational Park; V	T-junctions
Selangor	Sabak Bernam	Bagan Nakhoda Omar			Bagan Nakhoda Omar; Kampung Simpang Empat Bagan Nakhoda Omar	B46 Jalan Parit Baru – Kampung Sungai Apong	T-junctions
Selangor	Sabak Bernam	Sungai Air Tawar			Sungai Air Tawar	B46 Jalan Sungai Tengar – Kampung Sungai Tengar, Kampung Parit Baharu	T-junctions
Selangor	Sabak Bernam	Sungai Air Tawar			Sungai Air Tawar; Town Centre	Jalan Masjid	Junctions
Selangor	Sabak Bernam	Sungai Air Tawar			Kampung Datuk Rahmat Shafiee	Jalan Kampung Dato Hormat	T-junctions
Selangor–Perak border					Sungai Air Tawar–Hutan Melintang Bridge; Bernam River bridge Under construction		
Perak	Bagan Datuk	Hutan Melintang			Hutan Melintang; Parit 17	A123 Perak State Route A123 – Hutan Melintang, Bagan Datuk, Selekoh	T-junctions
1.000 mi = 1.609 km; 1.000 km = 0.621 mi: Unopened
