= 2016 Sungai Besar by-election =

- 18 June 2016

Constituency of Sungai Besar
- Registered: 42,655
- Turnout: 74.37% (▼13.89%)
		AMANAH	PAS
Candidate	Budiman Mohd Zohdi	Azhar Abdul Shukur	Abdul Rani Osman
Party	BN	Amanah	PAS
Popular vote	16,800	7,609	6,902
Percentage	53.66%	24.30%	22.04%
Swing	▲3.23%	New	▼27.42%
MP before election
Noriah Kasnon
BN
Elected MP
Budiman Mohd Zohdi
BN

A by-election was held for the Dewan Rakyat seat of P93 Sungai Besar, a parliamentary seat located in the state of Selangor, Malaysia on 18 June 2016 following the nomination day on 5 June 2016. The seat fell vacant after death of member of parliament Noriah Kasnon, who died in a helicopter crash on May 5, 2016 while campaigning in the Sarawak state election. Noriah Kasnon was also the Plantations Industries and Commodities Deputy Minister. In the 2013 general election, Noriah Kasnon won the seat with a majority of 399 votes beating Mohamed Salleh M Hussin of Pan-Malaysian Islamic Party (PAS). This by-election was held concurrently with the Kuala Kangsar by-election for the same reason.

The Barisan Nasional candidate was Budiman Mohd Zohdi from United Malays National Organisation (UMNO) who is also the Sungai Panjang state assemblyman. The PAS candidate is Abdul Rani Osman who is also the state assemblyman for Meru. The opposition coalition Pakatan Harapan has chosen Azhar Abdul Shukor from the National Trust Party (AMANAH) as its candidate.

Some of the issues that will be brought up during the by-election campaign are the Goods and Services tax, the rising cost of living and electricity tariffs.

== Results ==
Budiman Mohd Zohdi retained the seat for Barisan Nasional with a majority 9,191 votes beating both candidates from Amanah and PAS.

Malaysian general by-election, 18 June 2016: Sungai Besar The by-election was called due to the death of incumbent, Noriah Kasnon.
Party	Candidate	Votes	%	∆%
BN	Budiman Mohd Zohdi	16,800	53.66	▲3.12
Amanah	Azhar Abdul Shukur	7,609	24.30	N/A
PAS	Abdul Rani Osman	6,902	22.04	▼27.42
Total valid votes		31,311	100.00	
Total rejected ballots		379		
Unreturned ballots		31		
Turnout		31,721	74.37	
Registered electors		42,655		
Majority		9,191	29.36	
BN hold		Swing		
Source(s) "Pilihan Raya Kecil P.093 Sungai Besar". Election Commission of Malaysia. "Federal Government Gazette - Notice of Contested Election - By-election of the Dewan Rakyat of P.093 Sungai Besar for the State of Selangor [P.U. (B) 270/2016]" (PDF). Attorney General's Chambers of Malaysia. 6 June 2016. Archived from the original (PDF) on 2017-06-12. "Federal Government Gazette - Results of Contested Election and Statement of the Poll after the Official Addition of Votes for the By-election of P.093 Sungai Besar [P. U. (B) 299/2016]" (PDF). Attorney General's Chambers of Malaysia. 23 June 2016. Archived from the original (PDF) on 2019-12-28.
