= Sungai Besar (disambiguation) =

Sungai Besar or Sungei Besar may refer to:

- Sungai Besar
- Sungai Besar (federal constituency), represented in the Dewan Rakyat
- Sungai Besar (state constituency), formerly represented in the Selangor State Legislative Assembly (1959–2004)
