= Khir Toyo =

Malaysian politician

Dr. Mohd Khir Toyo PJK
- محمد خير تويو
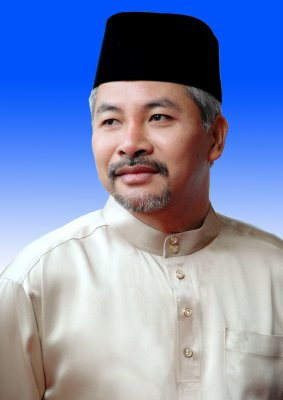

13th Menteri Besar of Selangor
- In office 18 August 2000 – 8 March 2008
- Monarchs: Salahuddin; Sharafuddin
- Preceded by: Abu Hassan Omar
- Succeeded by: Abdul Khalid Ibrahim
- Constituency: Sungai Panjang

Leader of the Opposition of Selangor
- In office 8 March 2008 – 6 December 2010
- Menteri Besar: Abdul Khalid Ibrahim
- Preceded by: Teng Chang Khim
- Succeeded by: Mohamad Satim Diman

Member of the Selangor State Legislative Assembly for Sungai Panjang
- In office 29 November 1999 – 5 May 2013
- Preceded by: Mohd Pauzi Abdul Murad (BN—UMNO)
- Succeeded by: Budiman Mohd Zohdi (BN—UMNO)
- Majority: 165 (1999); 5,460 (2004); 5,828 (2008)

Personal details
- Born: Mohamad Khir bin Toyo; 6 August 1965 (age 61) Tanjung Karang, Selangor, Malaysia
- Citizenship: Malaysian
- Party: United Malays National Organisation (UMNO) (until 2025); Malaysian United Indigenous Party (BERSATU) (2025–2026); National Vision Party (WAWASAN) (since 2026)
- Other political affiliations: Barisan Nasional (BN) (until 2025); Perikatan Nasional (PN) (since 2025)
- Spouses: Zahrah Kechik (m. 1990; divorced. 2022); Christine Zanitrah Abdullah (m. 2016)
- Children: 4 sons and 3 daughters
- Education: University of Malaya (BDS)
- Occupation: Politician, dentist
- Website: www.drkhir.com

Mohamad Khir bin Toyo (Jawi: محمد خير تويو, Malay pronunciation: [khir]; born 6 August 1965) is a Malaysian politician who served as the 13th Menteri Besar of Selangor from 2000 to 2008.

He is a member of the National Vision Party (WAWASAN), a component party of the Perikatan Nasional (PN) coalition. He was previously a member of the Malaysian United Indigenous Party (BERSATU), a component party of the Perikatan Nasional (PN) coalition and was previously a member of the United Malays National Organisation (UMNO), a component party of the Barisan Nasional (BN) coalition where his Barisan Nasional (BN) government in Selangor was defeated in the 2008 general election, following which he served as the state's opposition leader until December 2010. He was a member of the Selangor State Legislative Assembly (MLA) from 1999 to 2013, for the seat of Sungai Panjang.

== Personal life ==
Mohamad Khir bin Toyo was born on 6 August 1965 in Tali Air 2, Batu 4, Sungai Burung, Tanjung Karang, Selangor. He is the fifth child out of nine siblings. His Javanese Malaysian father, Toyo @ Joyo Erodikromo, was an immigrant turned naturalized citizen from Java, Indonesia, whilst his mother, Siti Aminah binti Mohd Taib, is a local-born native Malay.

Khir married Zahrah Kechik in 1990; the couple divorced on 19 September 2022. In 2016, he married Christine Zanitrah Abdullah, with whom he has one son, born in 2019.

Before his involvement in politics, Khir was trained as a dentist.

== Career ==
Khir was active in the youth wing of the United Malays National Organisation (UMNO), serving on its executive council. In 2000, at the age of 35, he became the Menteri Besar of Selangor at the insistence of Prime Minister Mahathir Mohamad, following the resignation of Abu Hassan Omar. His appointment as Menteri Besar came in his first term as a member of the Selangor State Legislative Assembly, having been elected as the member for Sungai Panjang in the 1999 election. His young age led to allegations, which he denied, that he had dyed his hair grey to give voters the impression that he was older.

Khir subsequently served as a member of UMNO's Supreme Council and Chairman of Selangor Barisan Nasional from 2000 to 2008. In 2004, Dr. Mohamad Khir won UMNO Supreme Council with the highest votes. Other positions that he holds in UMNO include the Chairman of the Selangor UMNO Communications Board and UMNO Division Head of Sungai Besar. Khir contested for the UMNO Youth Chief post in 2008, but eventually placed second in votes after Mukhriz Mahathir and lost the election to Khairy Jamaluddin.

He was the Menteri Besar of Selangor until the 12th General Election in March 2008. The state of Selangor fell to opposition hands following its worst defeat in Malaysian history. He was succeeded by Parti Keadilan Rakyat (PKR) secretary-general, Abdul Khalid Ibrahim. However, he remains the state assemblyman of Sungai Panjang constituency and became Selangor opposition chief. After the election, he ran for the leadership of UMNO Youth, but was defeated by Khairy Jamaluddin. He resigned as the opposition leader in December 2010, after he was charged with corruption over allegations that while he was the Menteri Besar, he was sold a lavish mansion for less than its market value.

Khir Toyo was finally sentenced to a jail term of 12 months for this act and his properties was ordered to be confiscated.

Khir Toyo's award of 'Darjah Kebesaran Seri Paduka Mahkota Selangor (SPMS) Kelas Pertama' with the title Dato' Seri which was conferred on him on 2001 was revoked by the Sultan of Selangor on 30 September 2015 after his conviction of corrupt practices was upheld by the Federal Court.

=== Candidacy for Sungai Besar ===
On 29 May 2022, Khir Toyo expressed his intention to contest in the upcoming Malaysian general election for the Sungai Besar parliamentary seat under Barisan Nasional (BN) and United Malays National Organisation (UMNO). He stated that his goal was to assist his party in reclaiming the seat, which had been won by Pakatan Harapan (PH) and later held by the Malaysian United Indigenous Party (BERSATU) following the 2018 Malaysian general election. However, he acknowledged that the final decision on his candidacy rested with the leadership of BN and UMNO, which was also considering Minister of Finance Tengku Zafrul Aziz as a potential candidate.

On 28 September 2022, he reiterated his readiness to return to politics by contesting the seat, which was then held by Muslimin Yahaya of BERSATU and the Perikatan Nasional (PN) coalition. Muslimin was also serving as the Deputy Minister of Entrepreneur Development and Cooperatives. Khir Toyo claimed that he had been actively engaging with the constituency for the past three years and intended to continue serving the community regardless of his candidacy status. He also remarked that his reception at local events indicated support for his potential candidacy. Additionally, he stated that BN needed a distinct manifesto to appeal to voters in the state, given its unique demographic and economic conditions.

Despite his interest in contesting, the BN leadership nominated Sungai Besar UMNO Division Chief Jamal Yunos as the candidate. In the general election, Muslimin Yahaya of PN successfully defended the seat and was re-elected as the Sungai Besar MP for a second term.

== Controversies and criticism ==
=== Zero Illegal Squatters Mission ===
It was a mission set by Khir Toyo himself to make Selangor 'zero squatters' in line with national policy Wawasan 2020. The opposition criticised Khir Toyo for approving housing project in squatters' area and forcing the residents to move out from their illegal homes. They claimed some of the village claim to be illegal homes had been built before independence in 1957 and most squatters living in a prime area are left homeless and received low compensation. The majority of the squatters are forced to rent or live in low-cost flats.

However report show most of the land is under private owner. "The (squatters) are occupying other people's land. The land will never be theirs as they are private land. They want the land but I can't give it to them" – Dr. Khir Toyo

Despite heavy criticism from opposition before this, the new Menteri Besar from opposition party, Tan Sri Abdul Khalid Ibrahim reported said the effort to reduce the number of squatters and to free them from the clutches of poverty, should continue.

In 2007, the state government had achieved 93.6 per cent success in addressing the squatter problem, having evicted 44,701 of the 47,756 squatter families to-date from all the local council areas in the state. The remaining squatters to be moved by August are 1,090 families from the Selayang Municipal Council (MPS) and 257 families from the Klang Municipal Council (MPK), the media secretariat in the Menteri Besar's Office said in a statement. A total of 1,708 squatter families were shifted following court cases, resettled to the North Gombak Orang Asli settlement and planned villages, it said. However, four local authorities still had squatters. They are MPS (984), MPK (221), Shah Alam City Council (307) and Ampang Jaya Municipal Council (196).

=== Bukit Cahaya Reserve ===
Khir Toyo had been accused of corruption for approving a construction project which trespasses Bukit Cahaya Seri Alam in Shah Alam, a forest reserve. However this land was approved before Khir took over power. To prove his innocence, Khir had asked Anti-Corruption Agency of Malaysia to investigate the incident.. In 2004, Anti-Corruption Agency declared no case against Khir Toyo.

=== Selangor State Development Corporation ===
On 30 October, the current State government of Selangor began investigations into irregularities by the Selangor State Development Corporation when it was run by Khir Toyo. A special investigative team which was set up for the purpose would probe how certain senior officers of the corporation were holding 30% shares in a subsidiary. This included an investigation of RM100,000 gift to former Menteri Besar as a bonus. In 2007, the state government only collected RM17mil revenue from sand mining instead of the RM170mil which it was supposed to get.

== Election results ==
Selangor State Legislative Assembly
Year	Constituency	Candidate	Votes	Pct	Opponent(s)	Votes	Pct	Ballots cast	Majority	Turnout
1999	N04 Sungai Panjang	Mohamed Khir Toyo (UMNO)	4,243	49.21%	Mohd Fadzlin Taslimin (PAS)	4,078	47.30%	8,622	165	71.77%
2004	N03 Sungai Panjang	Mohamed Khir Toyo (UMNO)	9,700	67.98%	Saibini Ismail (PAS)	4,240	29.71%	14,269	5,460	79.04%
2008	N03 Sungai Panjang	Mohamed Khir Toyo (UMNO)	11,181	66.14%	Mohd Fadzlin Taslimin (PAS)	5,353	31.66%	16,906	5,828	82.47%

== Honours ==
=== Honours of Malaysia ===
- Selangor
  - Knight Grand Commander of the Order of the Crown of Selangor (SPMS) – Dato' Seri (2001, revoked on 30 September 2015)
  - Recipient of the Meritorious Service Medal (PJK) (1997)

== See also ==
- Sungai Panjang (state constituency)

Political offices
Preceded by Abu Hassan Haji Omar	Chief Minister of Selangor; 2000–2008	Succeeded by Abdul Khalid Ibrahim
