= Selangor Young People Secretariat =

Selangor Young People Secretariat Sekreteriat Orang Muda Selangor SERANG
- Founded: 2012
- Founder: Budiman Mohd Zohdi
- Type: Non-government organization (NGO)
- Location: Selangor
- Region served: Selangor
- Fields: Social Politic
- Key people: Budiman Mohd Zohdi (Chairman)
- Website: www.facebook.com/serang.fanpage

Selangor Young People Secretariat, or in Malay: Sekreteriat Orang Muda Selangor (SERANG), is a Non-government organization (NGO) that fights for the young people's issues in Selangor. and to monitor the administration of the state of Selangor, which is led by the Pakatan Rakyat (PR) and its successor Pakatan Harapan (PH). They usually organize carnivals, stage performances and poem recitations to attract more young people to their cause. SERANG incumbent chairman is Budiman Mohd Zohdi who was the Selangor state legislative assemblyman (MLA) for the Sungai Panjang constituency (2013-2018) and was also the Member of Parliament (MP) for the Sungai Besar constituency (2016-2018) from United Malays National Organisation (UMNO) the main party of Barisan Nasional (BN) coalition.

One of the issues Budiman and his comrades brought forward was the free education that the state government promised.
