= Sallehen Mukhyi =

Malaysian politician

Yang Berhormat Tuan Sallehen Mukhyi SMS MLA
- صالحين مخيي

Member of the Selangor State Executive Council
- In office 30 May 2013 – 26 September 2014
- Monarch: Sharafuddin
- Menteri Besar: Khalid Ibrahim
- Portfolio: Islamic Affairs, Agricultural Modernisation and Village Development
- Preceded by: Yaakob Sapari
- Succeeded by: Zaidy Abdul Talib
- Constituency: Sabak

Member of the Selangor State Legislative Assembly for Sabak
- Incumbent
- Assumed office 12 August 2023
- Preceded by: Ahmad Mustain Othman (PH–AMANAH)
- Majority: 4,215 (2023)
- In office 5 May 2013 – 9 May 2018
- Preceded by: Warno Dogol (BN–UMNO)
- Succeeded by: Ahmad Mustain Othman (PH–AMANAH)
- Majority: 399 (2013)

Member of the Selangor State Legislative Assembly for Sungai Besar
- In office 29 November 1999 – 21 March 2004
- Preceded by: Ramli Norani (BN–UMNO)
- Succeeded by: Position abolished
- Majority: 199 (1999)

Personal details
- Born: 3 June 1967 (age 59) Sungai Besar, Selangor, Malaysia
- Party: Malaysian Islamic Party (PAS)
- Other political affiliations: Barisan Alternatif (BA) (1999–2004); Pakatan Rakyat (PR) (2008–2015); Gagasan Sejahtera (GS) (2016–2020); Perikatan Nasional (PN) (since 2020)
- Education: University of Malaya (UM); National University of Malaysia (UKM)
- Occupation: Politician

Sallehen bin Mukhyi is a Malaysian politician who has served as Member of the Selangor State Legislative Assembly (MLA) for Sabak from May 2013 to May 2018 and again since August 2023. He also served as Member of the Selangor State Executive Council (EXCO) in the Pakatan Rakyat (PR) state administration under former Menteri Besar Khalid Ibrahim from May 2013 to September 2014 and the MLA for Sungai Besar from November 1999 to March 2004. He is a member of the Malaysian Islamic Party (PAS), a component party of the Perikatan Nasional (PN) and formerly the Gagasan Sejahtera (GS), PR and Barisan Alternatif (BA) coalitions.

== Education ==
Sallehen graduated from International Islamic University Malaysia with a Diploma of Education degree and a Bachelor of Islamic studies degree in Quran and Sunnah from National University of Malaysia. He also obtained a Master of Modern Language Studies degree from the University of Malaya.

== Election results ==
Selangor State Legislative Assembly
Year	Constituency	Candidate	Votes	Pct	Opponent(s)	Votes	Pct	Ballots cast	Majority	Turnout
1999	N03 Sungai Besar	Sallehen Mukhyi (PAS)	4,666	50.85%	Ramli Norani (UMNO)	4,510	49.15%	9,482	156	71.06%
2004	N02 Sabak	Sallehen Mukhyi (PAS)	5,608	41.63%	Raja Ideris Raja Ahmad (UMNO)	7,864	58.37%	13,804	2,256	75.63%
2008	N02 Sabak	Sallehen Mukhyi (PAS)	6,884	49.58%	Warno Dogol (UMNO)	7,001	50.42%	14,325	117	76.79%
2013	N02 Sabak	Sallehen Mukhyi (PAS)	9,421	51.08%	Abdul Halim Udin (UMNO)	9,022	48.92%	18,837	399	85.12%
2018	N02 Sabak	Sallehen Mukhyi (PAS)	6,183	30.89%	Ahmad Mustain Othman (AMANAH)	6,981	34.88%	20,417	130	83.03%
2018	N02 Sabak	Sallehen Mukhyi (PAS)	6,183	30.89%	Sallehudin Mohd Iskan (UMNO)	6,851	34.23%	20,417	130	83.03%
2023	N02 Sabak	Sallehen Mukhyi (PAS)	13,431	59.31%	Samar Hashim (AMANAH)	9,216	40.69%	22,647	4,215	71.18%

Parliament of Malaysia
Year	Constituency	Candidate	Votes	Pct	Opponent(s)	Votes	Pct	Ballots cast	Majority	Turnout
2004	P093 Sungai Besar	Sallehen Mukhyi (PAS)	7,988	34.25%	Noriah Kasnon (UMNO)	15,337	65.75%	24,120	7,349	77.80%

== Honours ==
- Selangor
  - Companion of the Order of the Crown of Selangor (SMS) (2016)
