= Bernam River =

River in Perak and Selangor, Malaysia

Coordinates: 3°51′N 100°49′E

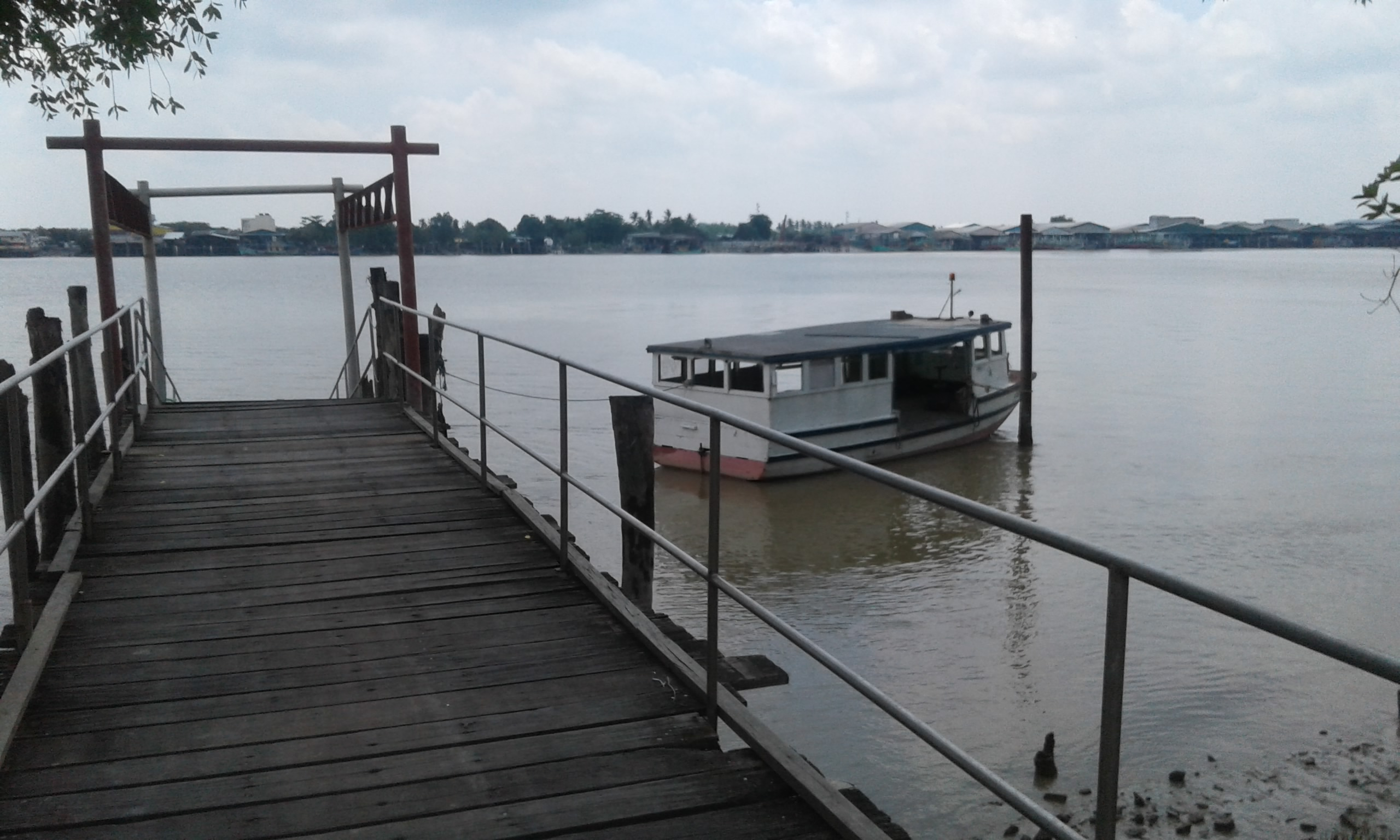
Bernam River in Hutan Melintang, on the Perakian side

The Bernam River (Malay: Sungai Bernam) is a river located between the Malaysian states of Perak and Selangor, demarcating the border of the two states. The river also separates the respective districts of Muallim and Bagan Datuk on the north and Hulu Selangor and Sabak Bernam in the south.

== Course ==
The river, looking upstream. Sabak, Selangor.

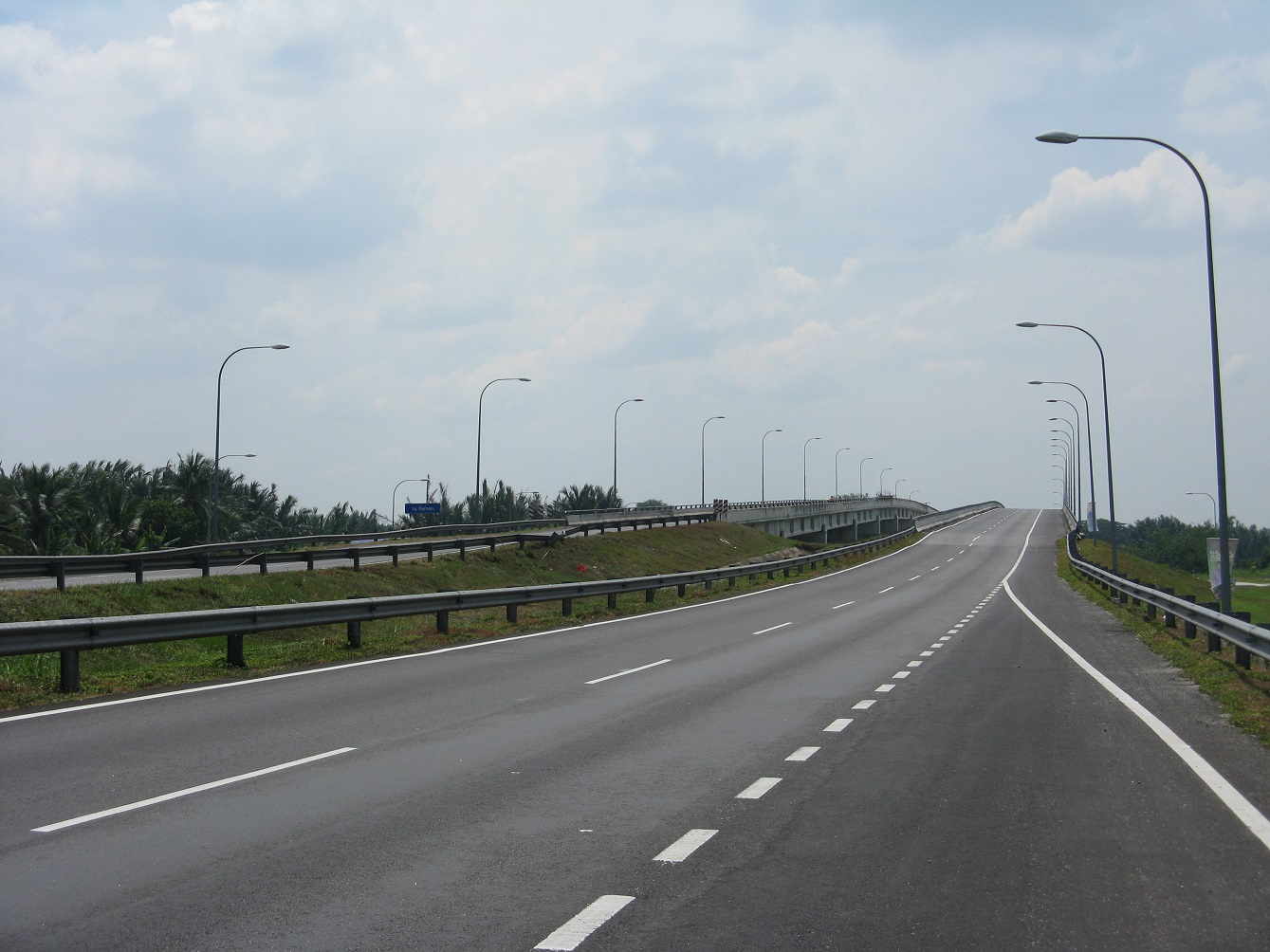
Sungai Bernam Bridge (a section of Route FT 5)

The Bernam River flows from Mount Liang Timur (Mount Liang East) in the east on the Titiwangsa Mountains to the Straits of Malacca in the west.

The eastern part of the river is suitable for palm oil and rubber tree plantation, while swamps fill the western areas. A percentage of the swampy areas have been reclaimed and dried up by a drainage system. Some the reclaimed area has been converted into paddy fields.

=== Historical importance ===
Archeologists have discovered several archaeological sites along the river, where ancient artifacts were found. Excavation works had been carried out by experts from various local universities and Muzium Sultan Alam Shah.

== Towns along the river basin ==
- Tanjong Malim
- Ulu Bernam
- Behrang
- Slim River
- Sabak
- Sungai Ayer Tawar
- Bagan Nakhoda Omar
- Hutan Melintang
- Bagan Datuk
Tanjong Malim

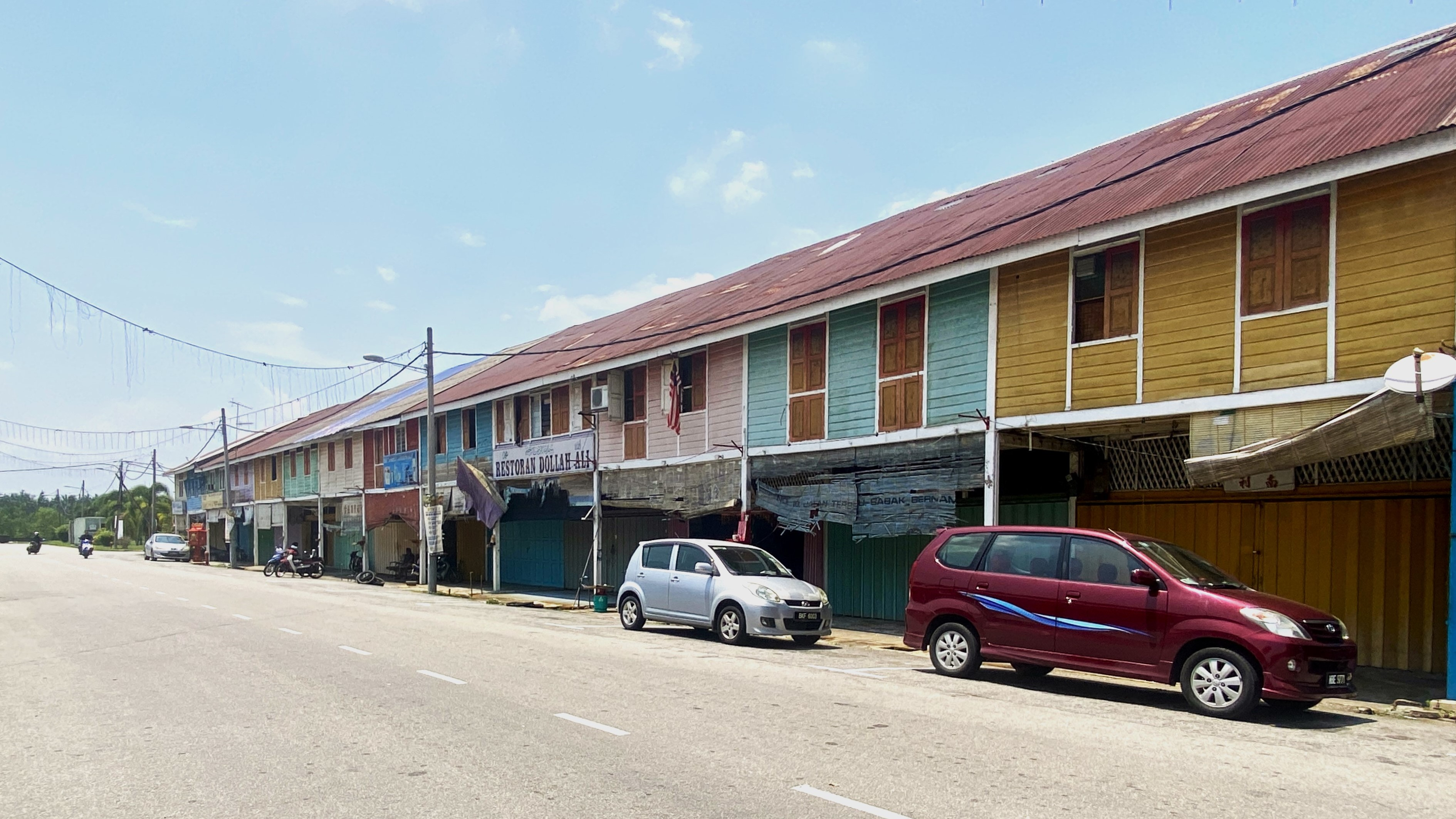
Sabak

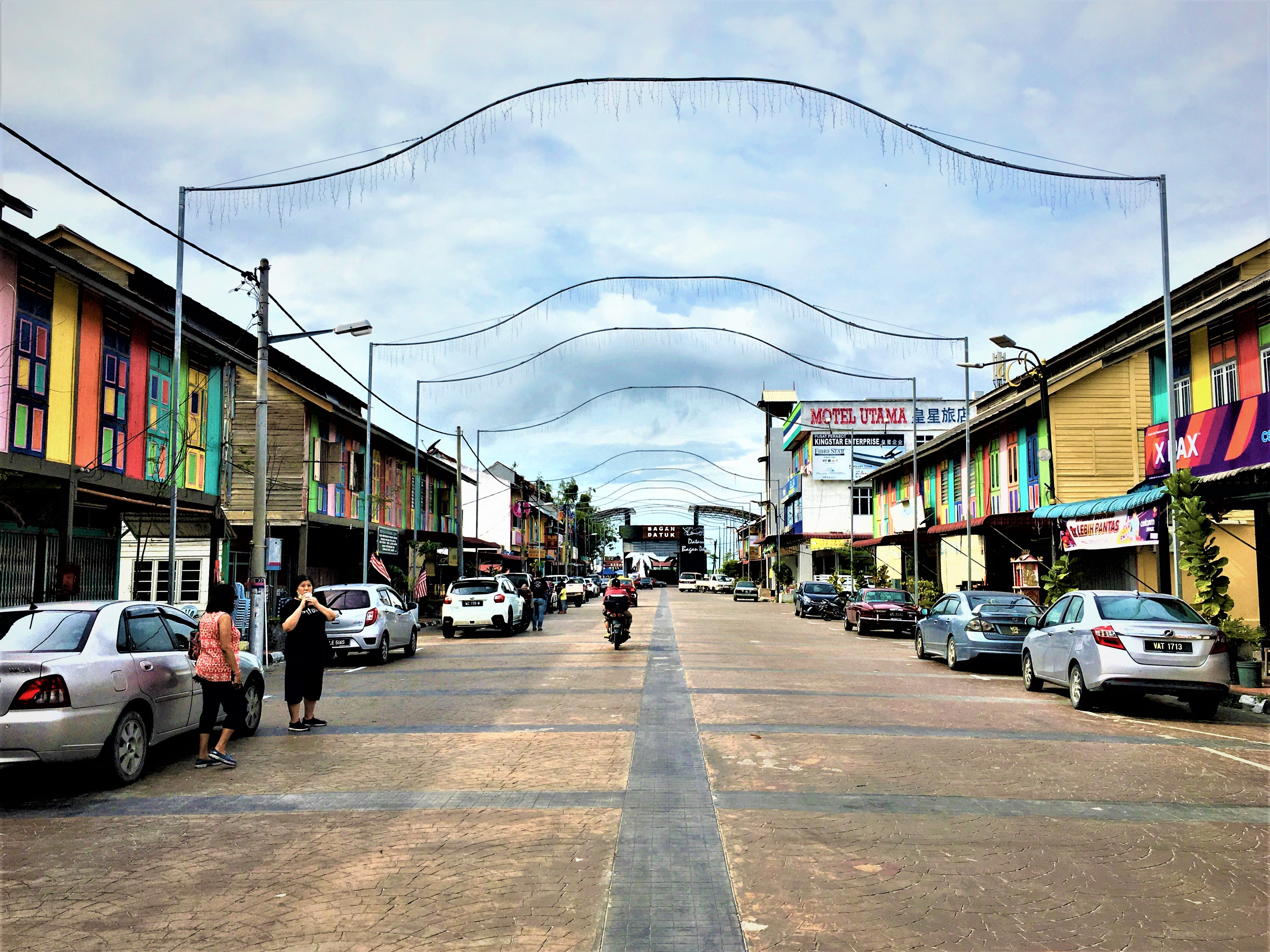
Bagan Datuk

== See also ==
- List of rivers of Malaysia
