= Muslimin Yahaya =

Malaysian politician

Yang Berhormat Datuk Muslimin Yahaya PMW AMN PPT MP
- مسلمين يحيى
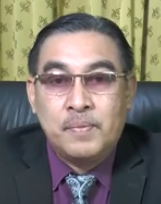

Deputy Minister of Entrepreneur Development and Cooperative
- In office 30 August 2021 – 24 November 2022
- Monarch: Abdullah
- Prime Minister: Ismail Sabri Yaakob
- Minister: Noh Omar
- Preceded by: Mas Ermieyati Samsudin
- Succeeded by: Saraswathy Kandasami
- Constituency: Sungai Besar

Deputy Minister of Education I
- In office 10 March 2020 – 16 August 2021 Serving with Mah Hang Soon (Deputy Minister of Education I)
- Monarch: Abdullah
- Prime Minister: Muhyiddin Yassin
- Minister: Radzi Jidin
- Preceded by: Teo Nie Ching
- Succeeded by: Mohamad Alamin
- Constituency: Sungai Besar

Member of the Malaysian Parliament for Sungai Besar
- Incumbent
- Assumed office 9 May 2018
- Preceded by: Budiman Mohd Zohdi (BN–UMNO)
- Majority: 714 (2018); 2,721 (2022)

Faction represented in Dewan Rakyat
- 2018–2020: Pakatan Harapan
- 2020: Malaysian United Indigenous Party
- 2020–: Perikatan Nasional

Personal details
- Born: Muslimin bin Yahaya; 13 July 1967 (age 59) Parit 8 Gambut Sungai Panjang, Sungai Besar, Selangor
- Citizenship: Malaysian
- Party: UMNO (until 2018); BERSATU (2018–present)
- Other political affiliations: Barisan Nasional (until 2018); Pakatan Harapan (2018–2020); Perikatan Nasional (since 2020)
- Spouse: Hanisah Paiman
- Occupation: Politician
- Website: https://cikgumusliminyahaya.blogspot.com/

Muslimin bin Yahaya (Jawi مسلمين بن يحيى; born 13 July 1967) is a Malaysian politician who has served as Member of Parliament (MP) for Sungai Besar since May 2018. He served as the Deputy Minister of Entrepreneur Development and Cooperative in the Barisan Nasional (BN) administration under former Prime Minister Ismail Sabri Yaakob and former Minister Noh Omar from August 2021 to the collapse of the BN administration in November 2022 and Deputy Minister of Education I in the Perikatan Nasional (PN) administration under former Prime Minister Muhyiddin Yassin and former Minister Mohd Radzi Md Jidin from March 2020 to the collapse of PN administration in August 2021. He is a member of the Malaysian United Indigenous Party (BERSATU), a component party of the PN coalition and former component party of the Pakatan Harapan (PH) coalition and was a member of the United Malays National Organisation (UMNO), a component party of the Barisan Nasional (BN) coalition. After the defeat of BN to PH in 2018 general election, he resigned from UMNO in 2018 and joined BERSATU in 2019.

== Personal life ==
He was born in Parit 8 Gambut, Sungai Panjang, Sungai Besar, Selangor on 13 July 1967 and married his partner, Hanisah Paiman.

== Career ==
He was previously appointed Senior Secretariat to Tan Sri Noriah Kasnon in Ministry of Plantation Industries and Commodities in 2014.

== Election results ==
Parliament of Malaysia
Year	Constituency	Candidate	Votes	Pct	Opponent(s)	Votes	Pct	Ballots cast	Majority	Turnout
2018	P093 Sungai Besar	Muslimin Yahaya (BERSATU)	17,350	42.11%	Budiman Mohd Zohdi (UMNO)	16,636	40.37%	41,878	714	85.92%
2018	P093 Sungai Besar	Muslimin Yahaya (BERSATU)	17,350	42.11%	Mohamed Salleh M Husin (PAS)	7,220	17.52%	41,878	714	85.92%
2022	P093 Sungai Besar	Muslimin Yahaya (BERSATU)	19,791	38.75%	Saipolyazan Mat Yusop (PKR)	17,070	33.42%	51,070	2,721	79.32%
2022	P093 Sungai Besar	Muslimin Yahaya (BERSATU)	19,791	38.75%	Jamal Yunos (UMNO)	13,984	27.38%	51,070	2,721	79.32%
2022	P093 Sungai Besar	Muslimin Yahaya (BERSATU)	19,791	38.75%	Asmawar Samat @Samad (PEJUANG)	225	0.44%	51,070	2,721	79.32%

== Honours ==
=== Honours of Malaysia ===
- Malaysia
  - Recipient of the 17th Yang di-Pertuan Agong Installation Medal (2024)
  - Member of the Order of the Defender of the Realm (AMN) (2015)
- Federal Territory (Malaysia)
  - Commander of the Order of the Territorial Crown (PMW) – Datuk (2022)
- Selangor
  - Recipient of the Distinguished Conduct Medal (PPT) (2006)
