= Sabak, Selangor =

Town in Sabuk Bernam, Selangor, Malaysia

Coordinates: 3°46′12″N 100°58′48″E

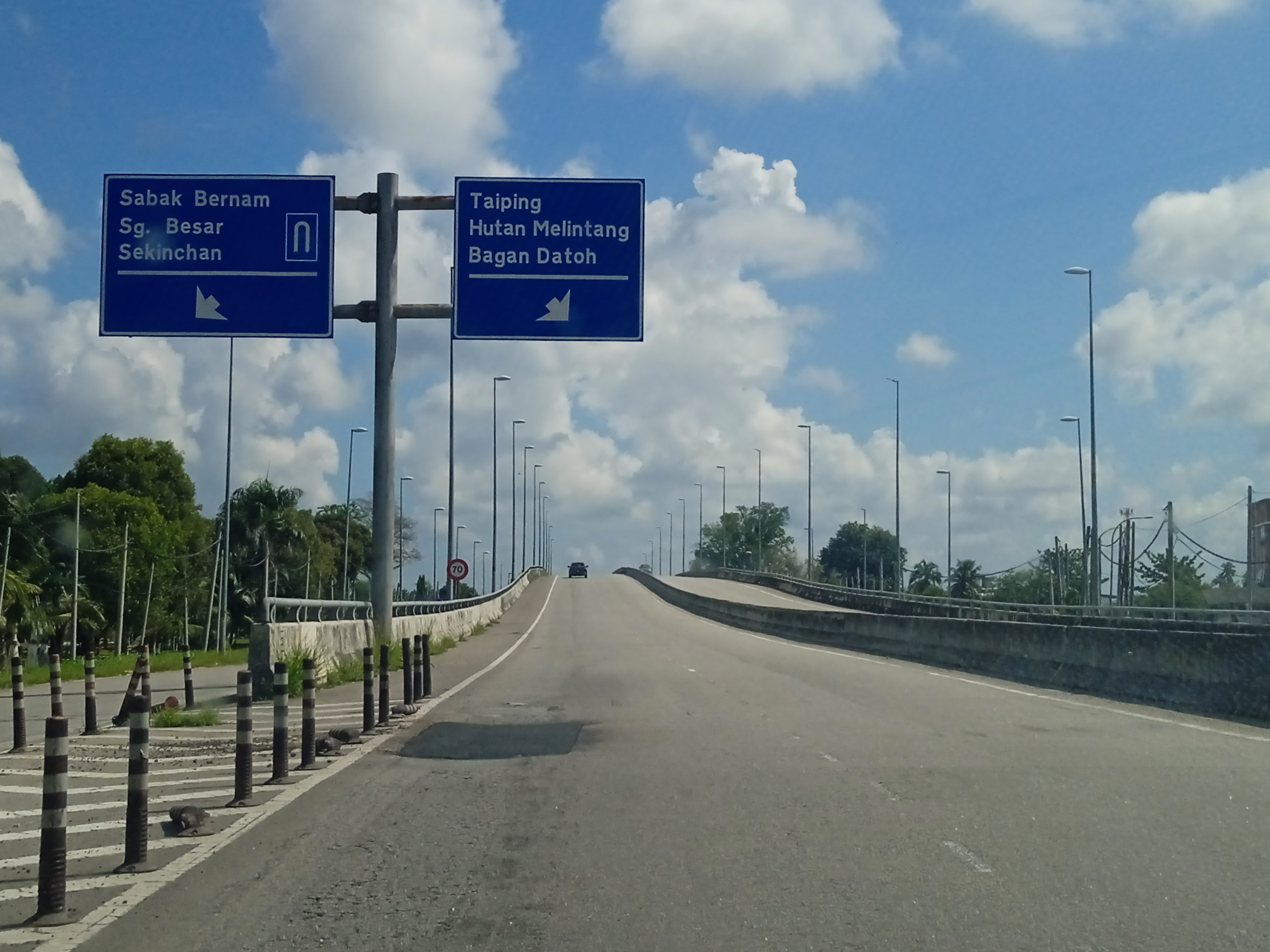
Sabak

Sabak in Sabak Bernam District

Sabak (Malay: Sabak) is a coastal town in Sabak Bernam District, Selangor, Malaysia. It is situated on the northwestern corner of Selangor, just south of the Bernam River, Selangor's natural border with Perak.

Major economic activities in the town are palm oil plantations ran by individuals as well as private organizations such as Sime Darby. This town is undergoing infrastructure development with added shops and drainage systems.

Sabak is the northernmost and westernmost town in Selangor, and is the furthest constituency from both Shah Alam and Kuala Lumpur. It is a 2-hour drive on Highway 5 from downtown Kuala Lumpur.

== Politics and government ==
Sabak is represented in the Selangor State Legislative Assembly by PAS's Sallehen Mukhyi.

On the national level, Sabak town is within the Sabak Bernam electoral district, represented by Kalam Salan, from Perikatan Nasional.

Sabak town, along with the entire Sabak Bernam constituency, forms the municipal area of the Sabak Bernam District Council (Majlis Daerah Sabak Bernam).

== Public transportation ==
Sabak Bernam is inaccessible from any railway/metro service, though there is a daily bus service, known as the Sabak Bernam-Kuala Lumpur Ekspres, running seven trips a day from Pudu Sentral (LRT Plaza Rakyat/MRT Merdeka) to Sabak Bernam, Sekinchan, Sungai Besar and as far as Teluk Intan.

== Notable Attractions ==
- Sabak Bernam Waterfront
- Sabak Bernam Museum
- Bernam River boat ports

== Places of Worship ==
- Masjid Jamek Sultan Hishamuddin
- Sabak Bernam Thien Hock Kong Temple (沙白安南河边街天福宫), founded in 1890
- Sabak Bernam Guan Di Temple (沙白安南河畔关帝庙)
- Sabak Bernam Theam Hock Keong (沙白安南天福宫)
- Sabak Bernam Tian Fa Gong (沙白安南六条沟天法宫)
- Sabak Bernam Xian Fa Shi Gong Temple (沙白安南仙法师公古庙)
- Sabak Bernam Pek Lian Si (沙白安南白莲寺)
- Lord Murugan Temple
- Maahad Sultan Salahuddin Abd Aziz Shah

== Facilities ==
- Tengku Ampuan Jemaah Hospital
- Maybank Branch Sabak Bernam
- Public Bank Branch Sabak Bernam
- Bank Simpanan Nasional Branch Sabak Bernam
- Oil Stations - 5Petrol, Shell, Petronas, BP, Caltex
- Police Station Sabak Bernam
- Road Transport Department Sabak Bernam (JPJ)
- Restaurants - Restoran Haziq, Restoran Al-Iman(RSK), Restoran Toman, KFC
- MDSB Food Corners - Ali Mamak Corner(No.32)
- Good Stores - 7-Eleven, 99 Speedmart, Ten Ten Hypermarket, Billion Hypermarket
- 4 Digit Number Betting Stores - Magnum Corporation, Damacai, Sports Toto

== Educations ==
- SJK (T) Ladang Torkington - (Primary School)
- SJK (C) Lum Hua - (Primary School)
- SK Khir Johari - (Primary School)
- Sekolah Kebangsaan Dr. Abdul Latiff - (Primary School)
- Kolej Tingkatan Enam Tunku Abdul Rahman Putra [collage]
- Sekolah Menengah Ungku Aziz - (Secondary School)
- Sekolah Agama Menengah Muhammadiah Pekan Sabak
- Ministry of Higher Education (Malaysia) 's Polytechnic of Sultan Idris Shah (PSIS), Sg Lang
- Institut Perakaunan Negara (IPN), Sg Lang
- Institut Latihan Dan Dakwah Selangor (ILDAS), Sg Lang
- Ministry of Higher Education (Malaysia) 's Community College of Sabak Bernam

== Other uses ==
Sabak is also name of a Hindi movie starring Shatrughan Sinha, released in 1973.
