= Budiman Mohd Zohdi =

Malaysian politician and youth activist

Yang Berbahagia Datuk Budiman Mohd Zohdi DPSM PPN
- بوديمن محمد زهدي

Member of the Malaysian Parliament for Sungai Besar
- In office 18 June 2016 – 9 May 2018
- Preceded by: Noriah Kasnon (BN–UMNO)
- Succeeded by: Muslimin Yahaya (PH–BERSATU)
- Majority: 9,191 (2016)

Member of the Selangor State Legislative Assembly for Sungai Panjang
- In office 5 May 2013 – 9 May 2018
- Preceded by: Mohamed Khir Toyo (BN–UMNO)
- Succeeded by: Mohd Imran Tamrin (BN–UMNO)
- Majority: 2,183 (2013)

Personal details
- Born: Budiman bin Mohd Zohdi; 11 March 1972 (age 54) Sungai Besar, Selangor, Malaysia
- Party: United Malays National Organisation (UMNO)
- Other political affiliations: Barisan Nasional (BN)
- Spouse: Norma Aida Abdullah
- Children: Aida Jasmin Kirana
- Occupation: Politician; Youth activist

Budiman bin Mohd Zohdi (born 11 March 1972) is a Malaysian politician and youth activist who served as the Member of Parliament (MP) for Sungai Besar from June 2016 and Member of the Selangor State Legislative Assembly (MLA) for Sungai Panjang from May 2013 to May 2018 respectively. He is a member of the United Malay National Organisation (UMNO), a component party of the Barisan Nasional (BN) coalition.

== Personal life ==
Budiman lives in Sungai Besar with his wife Norma Aida Abdullah; a Universiti Kebangsaan Malaysia lecturer and a daughter Aida Jasmin Kirana.

== Education ==
After completing his Sijil Pelajaran Malaysia (Malaysian School Certificate), Budiman went to Polytechnic in Kota Baru for his Diploma in Marketing and graduated in 1992.

He then pursue his study in bachelor's degree in Business Administration at National University of Malaysia and received his scroll in 1997.

For the thirst of knowledge, he went to pursue his masters in University Putra Malaysia and graduated with the master's degree in Communication in 2003.

At present, he is a Ph.D candidate in Political Science at the National University of Malaysia since 2014.

Budiman is also a Master Trainer in Neuro-linguistic programming certificate from the prestigious NFNLP USA (Dr William Horton).

== Early career ==
Budiman works for Telekom Malaysia (TM) designated as a Manager for Training and Quality, under the Group Business Assurance Team.

For his excellence performance, he was later offered a position at Federal Development Office for Selangor, under the purview of Prime Minister Office from 1 March 2012 until 1 May 2013.

== Leadership ==
Budiman is a Deputy Head of UMNO for Sungai Besar division.

He was a student leader in his college years between 1992 and 1997. He leads the Mahasiswa Pro-BN movement by establishing the Tindakan Mahasiswa Bersatu team, leading to a victory in Student Council Election that year.

He won the Japan International Agency Award (JAICA) in Tokyo in 1992. His leadership skills are developed through debate and oratory. He was crowned Best Debater ASEAN University in 1996 and Malaysia Best University Debater in 1997. He is also Chairman of Jaringan Pemidato Malaysia.

Budiman was appointed to foresee and lead several organization previously when BN was still the ruling government. He was also appointed as the Chairman of Board Directors for Malaysian Institute of Translation & Books (ITBM); an institute established with the aim of translating books, articles and reading materials; and publishing education books in the Malay language. In 2016, he won Anugerah Buku Negara under the entrepreneur category with a research title "Hayati Nilai Koperasi, Semaikan Budi".

Budiman appointed to sit in Board of Directors of several government related institution such as Yayasan MARA, Cooperative College of Malaysia and Amanah Raya Berhad.

He is a writer as he has 7 books under his name, and an active contributor by writing articles for several mainstream newspaper. He is a moderator for a segment at MySuara.com (an internet radio) named Postowaibi and an active social media user.

== NGO Involvement ==
Budiman is the founding Chairman of Selangor Young People Secretariat or Sekreteriat Orang Muda Selangor (SERANG), which is a non-governmental organization (NGO) that fight for the issues of young people in Selangor and to monitor the administration of the state of Selangor which is led by the Pakatan Rakyat. They usually organize carnivals, stage performance and poem recitation in order to attract more young people to their cause.

Some of the issues brought forward by Budiman and his comrades are the free education promised by the state government.

He is also the president of SLR Institute; a centre for social and political research.

Apart from that, Mr Budiman is the President of Yayasan Harapan Budi; a Foundation focusing kids and Information Technology (IT), political awareness among the physically disabled person and poverty among the youngsters.

And Also Chairman Of Mayc Negeri Selangor And Chairman Of Majlis Belia Selangor Daerah Sabak Bernam.

== Election results ==
Selangor State Legislative Assembly
| Year | Constituency | Candidate | Votes | Pct | Opponent(s) | Votes | Pct | Ballots cast | Majority | Turnout |
|---|---|---|---|---|---|---|---|---|---|---|
| 2013 | N03 Sungai Panjang | Budiman Mohd Zohdi (UMNO) | 12,606 | 54.74% | Mohd Fadzin Taslimin (PAS) | 10,423 | 45.26% | 23,496 | 2,183 | 88.40% |

Parliament of Malaysia
| Year | Constituency | Candidate | Votes | Pct | Opponent(s) | Votes | Pct | Ballots cast | Majority | Turnout |
|---|---|---|---|---|---|---|---|---|---|---|
| 2016 | P093 Sungai Besar | Budiman Mohd Zohdi (UMNO) | 16,800 | 53.66% | Azhar Abdul Shukor (AMANAH) | 7,609 | 24.30% | 31,721 | 9,191 | 74.37% |
| 2016 | P093 Sungai Besar | Budiman Mohd Zohdi (UMNO) | 16,800 | 53.66% | Abdul Rani Osman (PAS) | 6,902 | 22.04% | 31,721 | 9,191 | 74.37% |
| 2018 | P093 Sungai Besar | Budiman Mohd Zohdi (UMNO) | 16,636 | 34.10% | Muslimin Yahaya (BERSATU) | 17,350 | 35.60% | 41,878 | 714 | 85.92% |
| 2018 | P093 Sungai Besar | Budiman Mohd Zohdi (UMNO) | 16,636 | 34.10% | Mohamed Salleh M Husin (PAS) | 7,220 | 14.80% | 41,878 | 714 | 85.92% |

== Honours ==
=== Honours of Malaysia ===
- Malaysia
  - Medal of the Order of the Defender of the Realm (PPN) (2012)
- Malacca
  - Companion Class II of the Exalted Order of Malacca (DPSM) – Datuk (2020)

== See also ==
- Selangor Young People Secretariat or Sekreteriat Orang Muda Selangor (SERANG)
