= Ahmad Mustain Othman =

Malaysian politician

- احمد مستعين عثمان

Member of the Selangor State Legislative Assembly for Sabak
- In office 9 May 2018 – 12 August 2023
- Preceded by: Sallehen Mukhyi (PR–PAS)
- Succeeded by: Sallehen Mukhyi (PN–PAS)
- Majority: 130 (2018)

Personal details
- Born: Selangor, Malaysia
- Citizenship: Malaysian
- Party: National Trust Party (AMANAH) (–2020); Independent (2020–2021); People's Justice Party (PKR) (since 2021)
- Other political affiliations: Pakatan Harapan (PH) (–2020, since 2021)
- Occupation: Politician

Ahmad Mustain bin Othman is a Malaysian politician who served as Member of the Selangor State Legislative Assembly (MLA) for Sabak from May 2018 to August 2023. He is a member of the People's Justice Party (PKR) and was a member of the National Trust Party (AMANAH), both are component parties of the Pakatan Harapan (PH) coalition. He was removed from AMANAH in July 2020 and he joined PKR in February 2021.

Ahmad Mustain Othman was elected as Branch Chief of Sabak Bernam of the People's Justice Party in 2025.

== Election results ==
Selangor State Legislative Assembly
Year	Constituency	Candidate	Votes	Pct	Opponent(s)	Votes	Pct	Ballots cast	Majority	Turnout
2018	N02 Sabak	Ahmad Mustain Othman (AMANAH)	6,981	34.88%	Sallehudin Mohd Iskan (UMNO)	6,851	34.23%	20,417	130	83.03%
2018	N02 Sabak	Ahmad Mustain Othman (AMANAH)	6,981	34.88%	Sallehen Mukhyi (PAS)	6,183	30.89%	20,417	130	83.03%
