= Mohd Imran Tamrin =

Malaysian politician

Yang Berbahagia Dato' Mohd Imran Tamrin DIMP
- محمد عمران تمرين

Member of the Selangor State Legislative Assembly for Sungai Panjang
- In office 9 May 2018 – 12 August 2023
- Preceded by: Budiman Mohd Zohdi (BN–UMNO)
- Succeeded by: Mohd Razali Saari (PN–PAS)
- Majority: 2,084 (2018)

Personal details
- Born: Mohd Imran bin Tamrin; 1 November 1986 (age 39) Selangor, Malaysia
- Party: United Malays National Organisation (UMNO)
- Other political affiliations: Barisan Nasional (BN)
- Education: International Islamic University Malaysia (LLB)
- Profession: Lawyer

Yang Berbahagia Dato' Mohd Imran bin Tamrin (Jawi: محمد عمران تمرين, Malay pronunciation: [mohamad imran]; born 1 November 1986) is a Malaysian politician and lawyer who served as Member of the Selangor State Legislative Assembly (MLA) for Sungai Panjang from May 2018 to August 2023. He is a member of the United Malays National Organisation, a component party of the Barisan Nasional (BN) coalition. He has served as the State Youth Chief of UMNO Selangor and Division Youth Chief of UMNO of Sungai Besar since March 2023.

== Election results ==
Selangor State Legislative Assembly
Year	Constituency	Candidate	Votes	Pct	Opponent(s)	Votes	Pct	Ballots cast	Majority	Turnout
2018	N03 Sungai Panjang	Mohd Imran Tamrin (UMNO)	10,530	40.53%	Mariam Abdul Rashid (AMANAH)	8,446	35.52%	26,408	2,084	86.19%
2018	N03 Sungai Panjang	Mohd Imran Tamrin (UMNO)	10,530	40.53%	Mohd Razali Saari (PAS)	6,999	26.95%	26,408	2,084	86.19%
2023	N03 Sungai Panjang	Mohd Imran Tamrin (UMNO)	13,401	44.11%	Mohd Razali Saari (PAS)	16,977	55.89%	30,625	3,576	74.48%

== Honour ==
- Pahang
  - Knight Companion of the Order of the Crown of Pahang (DIMP) – Dato' (2015)
