= Noriah Kasnon =

Malaysian politician

Yang Berbahagia Tan Sri Datuk Noriah Kasnon PSM DPSM DSAP PJK

Deputy Minister of Plantation Industries and Commodities
- In office 16 May 2013 – 5 May 2016
- Monarchs: Abdul Halim; Muhammad V
- Prime Minister: Najib Razak
- Minister: Douglas Uggah Embas
- Constituency: Sungai Besar

Deputy Minister of Energy, Green Technology and Water
- In office 10 April 2009 – 15 May 2013
- Monarchs: Mizan Zainal Abidin; Abdul Halim
- Prime Minister: Najib Razak
- Minister: Peter Chin Fah Kui
- Constituency: Sungai Besar

Deputy Minister of Women, Family and Community Development
- In office 19 March 2008 – 9 April 2009
- Monarch: Mizan Zainal Abidin
- Prime Minister: Abdullah Ahmad Badawi
- Minister: Ng Yen Yen
- Constituency: Sungai Besar

Parliamentary Secretary of the Ministry of Information
- In office 2004–2008
- Monarchs: Sirajuddin; Mizan Zainal Abidin
- Prime Minister: Abdullah Ahmad Badawi
- Minister: Abdul Kadir Sheikh Fadzir (2004–2006); Zainuddin Maidin (2006–2008)
- Deputy Minister: Zainuddin Maidin (2004–2006); Donald Lim Siang Chai (2004–2006); Ahmad Zahid Hamidi (2006–2008); Chia Kwang Chye (2006–2008)
- Constituency: Sungai Besar

Member of the Malaysian Parliament for Sungai Besar
- In office 21 March 2004 – 5 May 2016
- Preceded by: new constituency
- Succeeded by: Budiman Mohd Zohdi (BN–UMNO)
- Majority: 7,349 (2004); 5,009 (2008); 399 (2013)

Faction represented in Dewan Rakyat
- 2004–2016: Barisan Nasional

Personal details
- Born: Noriah binti Kasnon; 2 January 1964 Tanjung Karang, Selangor, Malaysia
- Died: 5 May 2016 (aged 52) near Sebuyau, Sarawak, Malaysia
- Party: United Malays National Organisation (UMNO) (–2016)
- Other political affiliations: Barisan Nasional (BN) (–2016)
- Spouse: Asmuni Abdullah
- Education: Tunku Kurshiah College, Negeri Sembilan
- Occupation: Politician

Noriah binti Kasnon (2 January 1964 – 5 May 2016) was a Malaysian politician. She was the Member of Parliament of Malaysia for the Sungai Besar constituency in Selangor, Malaysia. She was a member of the United Malay National Organisation (UMNO) party and was a Deputy Minister in the Barisan Nasional (BN) governments of Abdullah Ahmad Badawi and Najib Razak.

== Political career ==
Noriah was elected to Parliament in the 2004 general election for the newly created seat of Sungai Besar, Selangor. She has since served as a deputy minister in a range of portfolios, including Energy, Green Technology and Water Ministry, and Women, Family and Community Development Ministry. In May 2013, she was appointed Deputy Minister of Plantation Industries and Commodities.

== Election results ==
Parliament of Malaysia
Year	Constituency	Candidate	Votes	Pct	Opponent(s)	Votes	Pct	Ballots cast	Majority	Turnout
2004	P093 Sungai Besar	Noriah Kasnon (UMNO)	15,337	65.75%	Sallehen Mukhyi (PAS)	7,988	34.25%	24,120	7,349	77.80%
2008	P093 Sungai Besar	Noriah Kasnon (UMNO)	16,069	59.23%	Osman Sabran (PAS)	11,060	40.77%	27,927	5,009	81.96%
2013	P093 Sungai Besar	Noriah Kasnon (UMNO)	18,695	50.54%	Mohamed Salleh M Husin (PAS)	18,296	49.46%	37,810	399	88.26%

== Death ==
Noriah and her husband, Asmuni Abdullah died in an AS 350 helicopter crash near Sebuyau, Sarawak. They were travelling with several other government officials from Betong to Kuching on 5 May 2016 during state election at the time when the helicopter lost contact with ground officials. Debris was found near Batang Lupar river the following day. The crash also killed Dato' Wan Mohammad Khair-il Anuar Wan Ahmad, the member of Parliament for Kuala Kangsar, Perak, Chairman of Malaysian Palm Oil Board (MPOB) and Datuk Dr Sundaran Annamalai, Secretary-General of Ministry of Plantation Industries and Commodities. Her remains were flown back to Selangor and buried at the Muslim Cemetery in Batu 12 Sungai Burong, Sabak Bernam.

== Honours ==
On 4 June 2016, in conjunction with the birthday of the 14th Yang di-Pertuan Agong, Tuanku Abdul Halim Muadzam Shah of Kedah conferred Noriah Kasnon the Panglima Setia Mahkota (PSM) award posthumously, which carries the title "Tan Sri".

- Malaysia
  - Commander of the Order of Loyalty to the Crown of Malaysia (PSM) – Tan Sri (2016 – Posthumously)
- Malacca
  - Companion Class II of the Exalted Order of Malacca (DPSM) – Datuk (2011)
- Pahang
  - Knight Companion of the Order of Sultan Ahmad Shah of Pahang (DSAP) – Dato' (2011)
- Selangor
  - Recipient of the Meritorious Service Medal (PJK) (1997)

== See also ==
- Sungai Besar (federal constituency)
