= Sungai Besar (state constituency) =

Selangor constituency

Defunct state constituency
- Legislature: Selangor State Legislative Assembly
- Constituency created: 1958
- Constituency abolished: 2004
- First contested: 1959
- Last contested: 1999

Sungai Besar was a state constituency in Selangor, Malaysia, that was represented in the Selangor State Legislative Assembly from 1959 to 2004.

The state constituency was created in the 1958 redistribution and was mandated to return a single member to the Selangor State Legislative Assembly under the first past the post voting system.

== History ==
It was abolished in 2004 when it was redistributed.

=== Representation history ===
Members of the Legislative Assembly for Sungai Besar
Assembly	No	Years	Member	Party
Constituency created
Sungei Besar
1st	N26	1959-1964	Taiban Hassan	Alliance (UMNO)
2nd	N26	1964-1969	Taiban Hassan	Alliance (UMNO)
		1969-1971	Assembly dissolved	
3rd	N26	1971-1973	Taiban Hassan	Alliance (UMNO)
3rd	N26	1973-1974	Taiban Hassan	BN (UMNO)
4th	N03	1974-1978	Mohamed Ghazali Kantan	BN (UMNO)
5th	N03	1978-1982	Mohamed Ghazali Kantan	BN (UMNO)
6th	N03	1982-1986	Mohamed Ghazali Kantan	BN (UMNO)
Sungai Besar
7th	N03	1986-1989	Abu Samah Nordin	BN (UMNO)
7th	N03	1989-1990	Mahbud Hashim	BN (UMNO)
8th	N03	1990-1995	Husin Taib	BN (UMNO)
9th	N03	1995-1999	Ramli Norani	BN (UMNO)
10th	N03	1999-2004	Sallehen Mukhyi	PAS
Constituency abolished, merged into Sabak

== Election results ==
Selangor state election, 1999
Party	Candidate	Votes	%	∆%
PAS	Sallehen Mukhyi	4,666	50.85	▲24.75
BN	Ramli Norani	4,510	49.15	▼24.75
Total valid votes		9,176	100.00	
Total rejected ballots		277		
Unreturned ballots		29		
Turnout		9,482	71.06	▲2.76
Registered electors		13,343		
Majority		156	1.70	▼46.11
PAS gain from BN		Swing		?

Selangor state election, 1995
Party	Candidate	Votes	%	∆%
BN	Ramli Norani	6,570	73.90	▲4.00
PAS	Ruslan Ahmad	2,320	26.10	▲26.10
Total valid votes		8,890	100.00	
Total rejected ballots		364		
Unreturned ballots		41		
Turnout		9,295	68.30	▼4.16
Registered electors		13,609		
Majority		4,250	47.81	▲8.02
BN hold		Swing		

Selangor state election, 1990
Party	Candidate	Votes	%	∆%
BN	Husin Taib	6,350	69.90	▲2.52
S46	Daud Sikandar Ali	2,735	30.10	▲30.10
Total valid votes		9,085	100.00	
Total rejected ballots		465		
Unreturned ballots		26		
Turnout		9,576	72.46	▲8.89
Registered electors		13,215		
Majority		3,615	39.79	▲5.03
BN hold		Swing		

Selangor state by-election, 1 November 1989 Upon the death of incumbent, Abu Samah Nordin
Party	Candidate	Votes	%	∆%
BN	Mahbud Hashim	5,098	67.38	▼4.61
PAS	Abd. Razak Dawami	2,468	32.62	▲4.61
Total valid votes		7,566	100.00	
Total rejected ballots		122		
Unreturned ballots		0		
Turnout		7,688	63.57	▼0.29
Registered electors		12,094		
Majority		2,630	34.76	▼9.22
BN hold		Swing		

Selangor state election, 1986
Party	Candidate	Votes	%	∆%
BN	Abu Samah Nordin	5,218	71.99	▼4.43
PAS	Ruslan Ahmad	2,030	28.01	▲4.43
Total valid votes		7,248	100.00	
Total rejected ballots		336		
Unreturned ballots		0		
Turnout		7,584	63.86	▼3.85
Registered electors		11,876		
Majority		3,188	43.98	▼8.86
BN hold		Swing		

Selangor state election, 1982: Sungei Besar
Party	Candidate	Votes	%	∆%
BN	Mohamed Ghazali Kantan	5,710	76.42	▲8.22
PAS	Ruslan Ahmad	1,762	23.58	▼8.22
Total valid votes		7,472	100.00	
Total rejected ballots		292		
Unreturned ballots		0		
Turnout		7,764	67.71	▲0.64
Registered electors		11,466		
Majority		3,948	52.84	▲16.44
BN hold		Swing		

Selangor state election, 1978: Sungei Besar
Party	Candidate	Votes	%	∆%
BN	Mohamed Ghazali Kantan	4,596	68.20	▼0.02
PAS	Hassan Shukri	2,143	31.80	▲31.80
Total valid votes		6,739	100.00	
Total rejected ballots		468		
Unreturned ballots		0		
Turnout		7,207	67.07	▼2.60
Registered electors		10,746		
Majority		2,453	36.40	▼2.73
BN hold		Swing		

Selangor state election, 1974: Sungei Besar
Party	Candidate	Votes	%	∆%
BN	Mohamed Ghazali Kantan	3,375	68.22	▲68.22
Independent	Taiban Hassan	1,439	29.09	▲29.09
PEKEMAS	Shariff Sadri	133	2.69	▲2.69
Total valid votes		4,947	100.00	
Total rejected ballots		530		
Unreturned ballots		0		
Turnout		5,477	69.67	
Registered electors		7,861		
Majority		1,936	39.13	
BN gain from Alliance Party (Malaysia) Party (Malaysia)		Swing		?

Selangor state election, 1969: Sungei Besar
Party	Candidate	Votes	%	∆%
Alliance	Taiban Hassan	5,787	62.15	▼3.18
PMIP	Hassan Shukri	3,524	37.85	▲3.18
Total valid votes		9,311	100.00	
Total rejected ballots		1,247		
Unreturned ballots		0		
Turnout		10,558	66.85	▼4.66
Registered electors		15,793		
Majority		2,263	24.30	▼6.35
Alliance hold		Swing		

Selangor state election, 1964: Sungei Besar
Party	Candidate	Votes	%	∆%
Alliance	Taiban Hassan	4,716	65.33	▲5.71
PMIP	Zakaria Ismail	2,503	34.67	▼5.71
Total valid votes		7,219	100.00	
Total rejected ballots		801		
Unreturned ballots		0		
Turnout		8,020	71.51	▲6.91
Registered electors		11,215		
Majority		2,213	30.66	▲11.42
Alliance hold		Swing		

Selangor state election, 1959: Sungei Besar
Party	Candidate	Votes	%	∆%
Alliance	Taiban Hassan	3,229	59.62	
PMIP	Abdul Hakim Abdullah	2,187	40.38	
Total valid votes		5,416	100.00	
Total rejected ballots		275		
Unreturned ballots		0		
Turnout		5,691	64.60	
Registered electors		8,810		
Majority		1,042	19.24	
This was a new constituency created.
