= Sungai Air Tawar =

Human settlement in Malaysia

Sungai Air Tawar

Sungai Air Tawar is a small town in Sabak Bernam District, Selangor, Malaysia. It is located near Bagan Nakhoda Omar.
