= Mariam Abdul Rashid =

Malaysian politician

Yang Berhormat Mariam Abdul Rashid MLA
- مَرْيَم عَبْدُٱلرَّشِيد

Member of the Selangor State Legislative Assembly for Meru
- Incumbent
- Assumed office 12 August 2023
- Preceded by: Mohd Fakhrulrazi Mohd Mokhtar (PH–AMANAH)
- Majority: 3,422 (2023)

Personal details
- Born: Mariam binti Abdul Rashid; 3 April 1961 (age 65) Kuala Lumpur, Malaysia
- Citizenship: Malaysian
- Party: National Trust Party (AMANAH)
- Other political affiliations: Pakatan Harapan (PH)
- Children: 8
- Education: Sultan Syarif Kasim II State Islamic University
- Occupation: Politician

Mariam binti Abdul Rashid is a Malaysian politician who has served as a Member of the Selangor State Legislative Assembly (MLA) for Meru since August 2023. She is a member of the National Trust Party (AMANAH), a component party of the Pakatan Harapan (PH) coalition.

== Election results ==
Selangor State Legislative Assembly
Year	Constituency	Candidate	Votes	Pct	Opponent(s)	Votes	Pct	Ballots cast	Majority	Turnout
2018	N03 Sungai Panjang	Mariam Abdul Rashid (AMANAH)	8,446	35.52%	Mohd Imran Tamrin (UMNO)	10,530	40.53%	26,408	2,084	86.19%
2018	N03 Sungai Panjang	Mariam Abdul Rashid (AMANAH)	8,446	35.52%	Mohd Razali Saari (PAS)	6,999	26.95%	26,408	2,084	86.19%
2023	N42 Meru	Mariam Abdul Rashid (AMANAH)	26,980	52.45%	Hasnizam Adham (BERSATU)	23,558	45.78%	51,437	3,422	76.73%
2023	N42 Meru	Mariam Abdul Rashid (AMANAH)	26,980	52.45%	Sivaranjani Manickam (PSM)	899	1.75%	51,437	3,422	76.73%
