= Sekinchan =

- Town

Other transcription(s)
  - Jawi: سكينچن
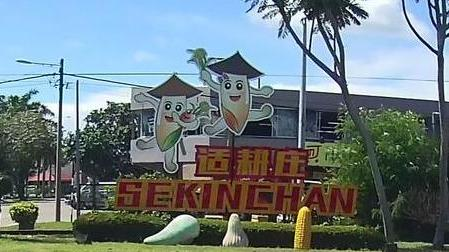
- Interactive map of Sekinchan
- Sekinchan in Selangor Sekinchan (Malaysia)
- Coordinates: 3°30′0″N 101°6′0″E
- Country: Malaysia
- State: Selangor
- District: Sabak Bernam

Government
  - Administered by: Sabak Bernam District Council (MDSB)
- Time zone: UTC+8 (MST)

Sekinchan
- Simplified Chinese: 适耕庄
- Literal meaning: "suitable for planting"
Transcriptions
Standard Mandarin
- Hanyu Pinyin: Shìgēng Zhuāng

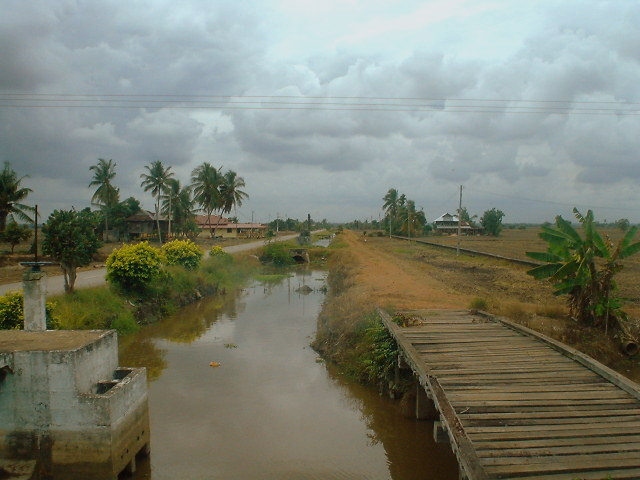
A typical view of the village in Sekinchan.

Sekinchan is a small town located in Sabak Bernam District, Selangor, Malaysia. It is located along the coastal Federal Route 5. Historically, the original name of Sekinchan was Sungai Sekinchang.

Sekinchan is one of the major rice producing areas of Malaysia with vast, well-irrigated and organized paddy fields producing 10 to 12 tons of rice per hectare in 2025. Sekinchan's approach is used also to boost rice production in other struggling regions as of 2025.

Sekinchan is often visited for its fresh seafood. It also draws diners from Kuala Lumpur and Ipoh. There are some rice millers in the area where locally produced rice can be purchased.

"The Seeds of Life", a local Chinese drama, is set there. Sekinchan's first water park, MSekin Wonderland, was opened in 2021.

== Etymology ==
It was thought that the name originally came from a corruption of "Second Chance" after the British pardoned the communists. The Chinese name of the town, "适耕庄", translates to "suitable for planting" in English.

While local popular accounts frequently link the name Sekinchan to the Chinese characters Shì Gēng Zhuāng (适耕庄), regional cartographic records from 1879 document the local waterway as Sungai Sekinchang prior to the establishment of the mid-20th-century agricultural settlements. In 1879, the vast paddy fields did not exist. The area was a dense mangrove swamp inhabited by a small population of Malay, Javanese, and Sumatran fishermen. The name Sekinchang came from local flora (the wild Sekijang shrub).

== Geography ==
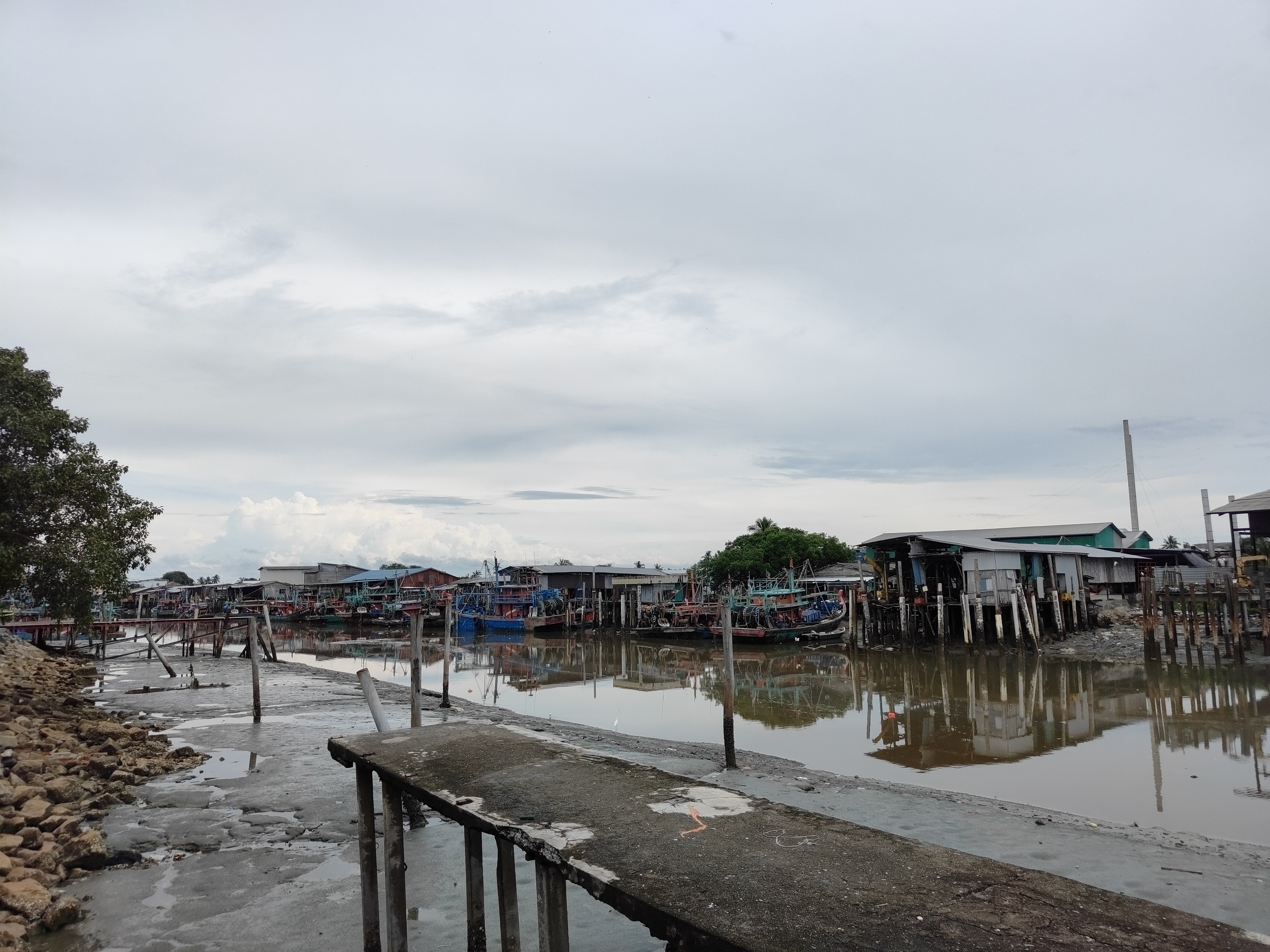
A view of Sekinchan old jetty at Redang Beach and a nearby fishing village.

Sekinchan is located on the northwest Selangor plains, which stretch from Tanjung Karang to Sabak Bernam and border the Straits of Malacca, providing coastal access to the sea. Its location on the flat, uninterrupted plains allows it to be known as the "rice bowl of Selangor."

== Education ==
=== Primary schools ===
- Sekolah Kebangsaan Sungai Nibong
- Sekolah Kebangsaan Sungai Leman
- Sekolah Kebangsaan Seri Sekinchan
- Sekolah Kebangsaan Pasir Panjang
- Sekolah Kebangsaan Parit Empat
- Sekolah Kebangsaan Parit 9
- Sekolah Kebangsaan Parit 13
- Sekolah Kebangsaan Berjaya
- Sekolah Jenis Kebangsaan (Tamil) Ghandiji
- Sekolah Jenis Kebangsaan (Cina) Yoke Kuan
- Sekolah Jenis Kebangsaan (Cina) Kian Sit

=== Secondary schools ===
- Sekolah Menengah Kebangsaan Dato Mustaffa
- Sekolah Menengah Jenis Kebangsaan Yoke Kuan

== Economy ==
The economy in Sekinchan is mainly based on agriculture – primarily paddy, fishing, and tourism.

== Transportation ==
The town is served by Federal Route 5 (Klang–Teluk Intan Highway), and local bus services are provided by the MDSB Smart Selangor Bus.
