= Tanjong Karang, Selangor =

Town in Selangor, Malaysia

Tanjong Karang
- Town

Other transcription(s)
  - Jawi: تنجوڠ كارڠ
  - Chinese: 丹绒加弄
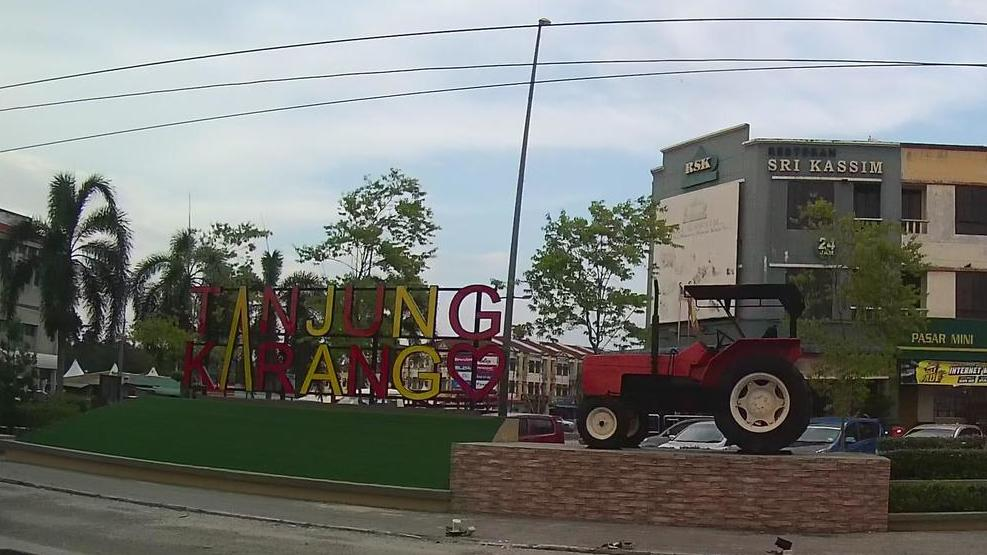

- Location within Selangor Location within Malaysia
- Coordinates: 3°25′N 101°11′E
- Country: Malaysia
- State: Selangor
- District: Kuala Selangor District
- Postal code: 45500
- Website: www.mdks.gov.my

Tanjong Karang in Kuala Selangor District

Tanjong Karang is a mukim in Kuala Selangor District, Selangor, Malaysia. It is loosely translated into English as the "Cape of Corals". Tanjong Karang town is divided by the Sungai Tengi at the middle but connected with a bridge. The local Chinese minority lives in the urban and seaside area, while most Malays live in rural areas and perform agricultural activities, particularly rice cultivation.

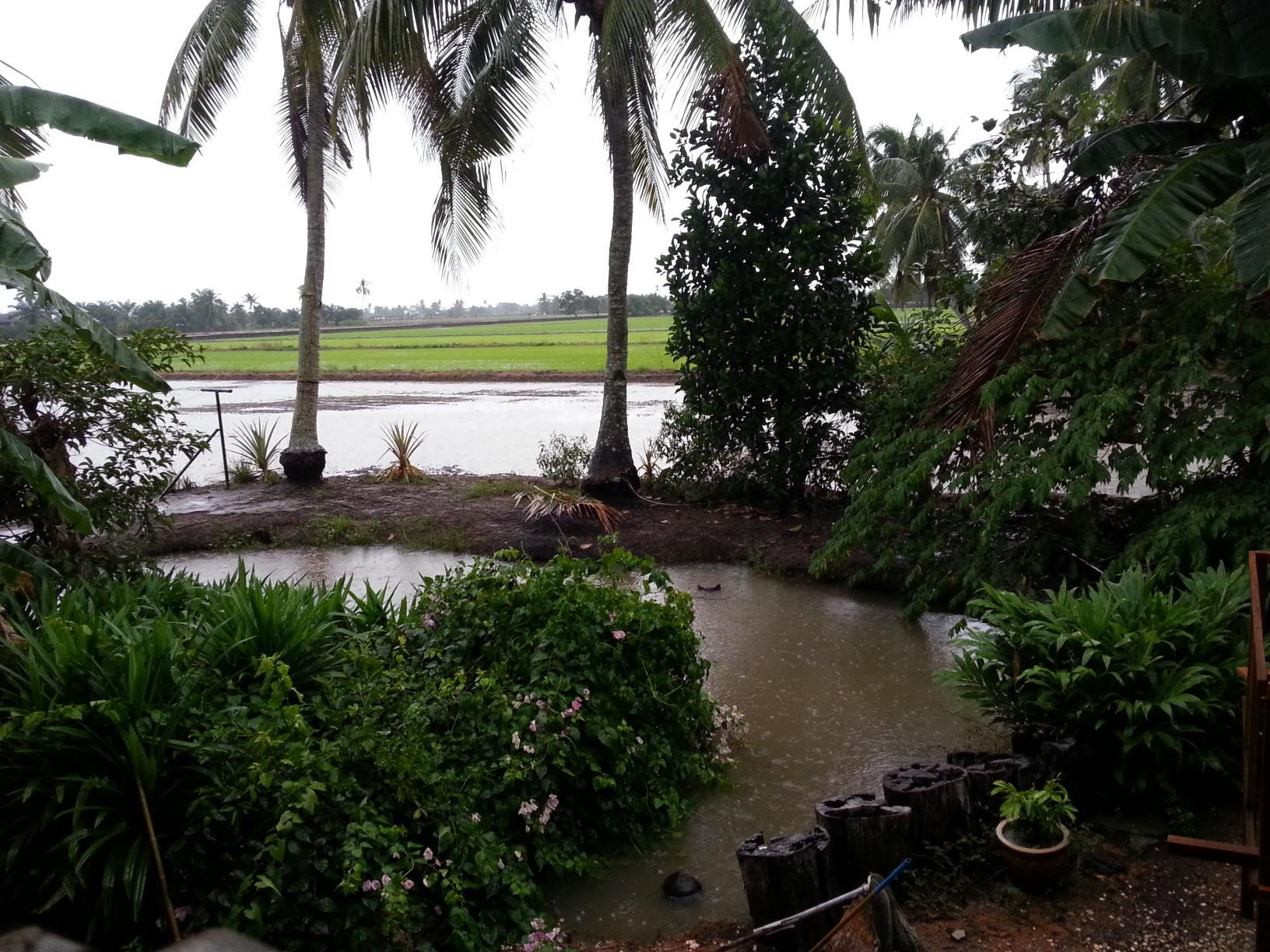
Sawah Sempadan during rain

== Ban Canal ==
There is a large canal that starts from Tanjong Karang which crossed but merged using watergate to Sungai Tengi. The canal ends in the district of Sabak Bernam. It is often called by the locals as bangkenal. Its function is to provide enough water to irrigate the rice crops; it is also used by a water supply company to provide treated water and as a place for freshwater fish farming among the villagers. In the past, this canal is involved in the forest harvesting activities. It serves as a router in sweeping the harvested timber by drifting it over the water to the 'Headworks' where the collection works is done for land transportation.

The canal was built by the Colonial Federal Government's Department of Irrigation and Drainage (Malay: Jabatan Pengairan dan Saliran) in 1953 as part of Tanjong Karang Irrigation Scheme project, it is a reclamation project that converted the swampland of Central Selangor to a cultivatable rice paddies by connecting Sungai Tengi to Sungai Bernam in Perak, the canal extend all the way from Tanjung Karang to Sungai Besar.

There are myths from the older people who claimed there was a giant snake found during the construction of this canal. It led to the cessation of further construction work at Seri Tiram.

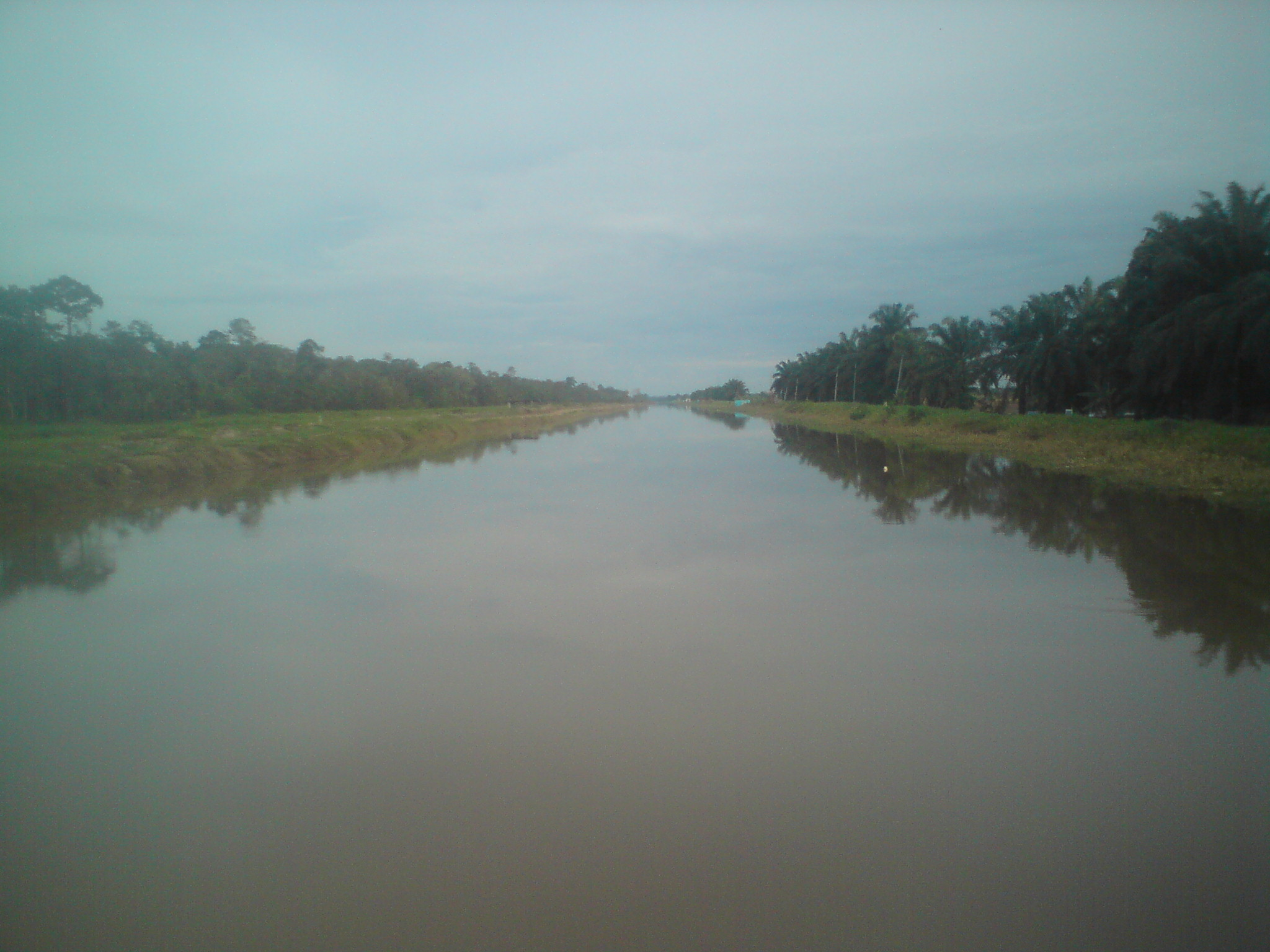
The ban canal has been used to irrigate rice crops by farmers.

== Historic building ==
There is an old historic building left without care at Kampung Sungai Kajang. It is believed that the building was at one time a palm sugar processing plant built during the colonial period. During the Second World War, the factory was captured and used as a Japanese military base. Some effects of the ravages of battle can be seen today. Only a small portion of the structure is maintained while almost the entire plant has been destroyed, whether caused by agriculture or land development.

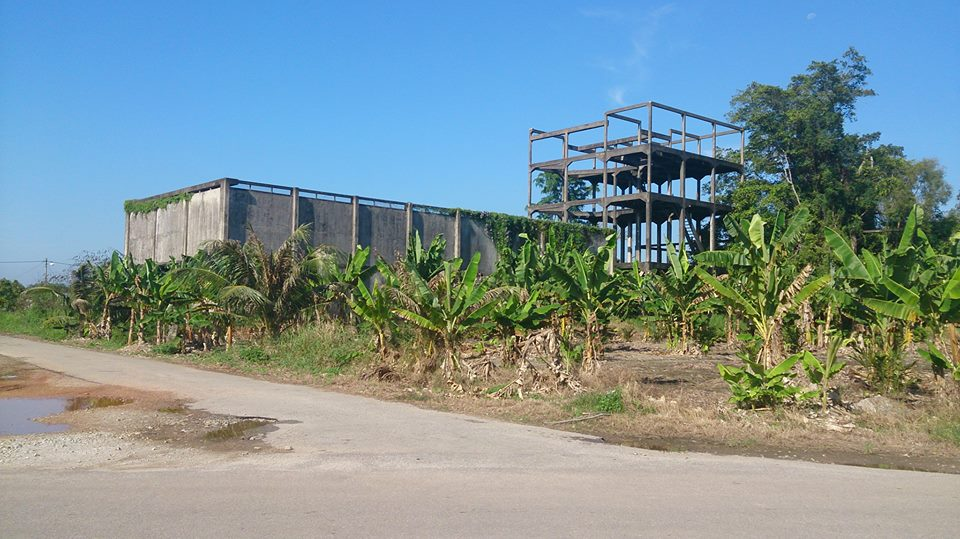
The historic palm sugar processing plant

== Notable people ==
- Noh Omar
- Mohd Amri Yahyah
- Khir Toyo

== In popular culture ==
Tanjong Karang has been known to the public after Nur Kasih a TV3 popular serial drama in 2009, made its filming here for kampung scenes.
