= Sabak (state constituency) =

Electoral district in Selangor, Malaysia

Sabak (N02)
Selangor constituency

State constituency
- Legislature: Selangor State Legislative Assembly
MLA
Sallehen Mukhyi
PN
- Constituency created: 1958
- First contested: 1959
- Last contested: 2023

Demographics
- Electors (2023): 31,816

Sabak is a state constituency in Selangor, Malaysia, that has been represented in the Selangor State Legislative Assembly since 1959. It has been represented by Sallehen Mukhyi of Perikatan Nasional (PN) since 2023, of Pakatan Rakyat (PR) from 2013 to 2015 and of the Malaysian Islamic Party (PAS) from 2015 to 2018.

The state constituency was created in the 1958 redistribution and elects a single member under the first-past-the-post system.

== Demographics ==
Ethnic breakdown of Sabak's electorate as of 2023
1. Malay (79.5%)
2. Chinese (13.4%)
3. Indian (6.23%)
4. Other ethnicities (0.78%)

== History ==
=== Polling districts ===
According to the gazette issued on 30 March 2018, the Sabak constituency has a total of 17 polling districts.

State constituency	Polling districts	Code	Location
Sabak (N02)	Sabak Bernam Barat	092/02/01	SK Doktor Abdul Latiff
Sabak (N02)	Kampung Air Manis	092/39/02	Balai Jawatankuasa Kemajuan Dan Keselamatan Kampung (JKKK) Kampung Batu 37 Darat
Sabak (N02)	Kampung Seri Aman	092/02/03	SK Panchang Bendera Sungai Besar
Sabak (N02)	Teluk Pulai	092/02/04	SK Tun Doktor Ismail
Sabak (N02)	Torkington	092/02/05	SJK (T) Ladang Sabak Bernam
Sabak (N02)	Sabak Bernam Timur	092/02/06	Kolej Tingkatan Eman Tunku Abdul Rahman Putra Sabak Bernam
Sabak (N02)	Bagan Nira	092/02/07	SRA Hidayatul Hasanah Bagan Nira'
Sabak (N02)	Kampung Sapintas	092/02/08	SRA Batu 2 Sapintas
Sabak (N02)	Kampung Bagan Terap	092/02/09	SK Bagan Terap
Sabak (N02)	Bagan Terap Parit Sembilan	092/02/10	SK Seri Bahagia Sungai Besar
Sabak (N02)	Tebuk Kenchong	092/02/11	SK Pair Enam Sungai Besar
Sabak (N02)	Parit Enam	092/02/12	SRA Parit 6 Timur Sungai Besar
Sabak (N02)	Parit Dua Timur	092/02/13	Dewan Orang Ramai Parit Enam Sungai Besar
Sabak (N02)	Parit Tiga & Empat	092/02/14	Balai Jawatankuasa Kemajuan Dan Keselamatan (JKKK) Parit 4 & 5 Barat
Sabak (N02)	Parit Satu Barat	092/02/15	SK Seri Makmur Sungai Besar
Sabak (N02)	Sungai Lias	092/02/16	SJK (C) Sin Min Sungai Besar
Sabak (N02)	Batu 4 Sapintas	092/02/17	SK Sapintas

=== Representation history ===
Members of the Legislative Assembly for Sabak
Assembly	No	Years	Member	Party
Constituency created
1st	N25	1959-1964	Mustafa Abdul Jabar	Alliance (UMNO)
2nd	N25	1964-1969	Lope Salleh Long @ Zainal Abidin	Alliance (UMNO)
		1969-1971	Assembly dissolved	
3rd	N25	1971-1973	Lope Salleh Long @ Zainal Abidin	Alliance (UMNO)
3rd	N25	1973-1974	Lope Salleh Long @ Zainal Abidin	BN (UMNO)
4th	N20	1974-1978	Lope Salleh Long @ Zainal Abidin	BN (UMNO)
5th	N20	1978-1982	Mohamad Yusof Abdul Latif	BN (UMNO)
6th	N20	1982-1986	Mohamad Yusof Abdul Latif	BN (UMNO)
7th	N20	1986-1990	Mohamad Yusof Abdul Latif	BN (UMNO)
8th	N20	1990-1995	Raja Ideris Raja Ahmad	BN (UMNO)
9th	N20	1995-1999	Raja Ideris Raja Ahmad	BN (UMNO)
10th	N20	1999-2004	Raja Ideris Raja Ahmad	BN (UMNO)
11th	N20	2004-2008	Raja Ideris Raja Ahmad	BN (UMNO)
12th	N20	2008-2013	Warno Dogol	BN (UMNO)
13th	N20	2013-2018	Sallehen Mukhyi	PR (PAS)
14th	N20	2018-2020	Ahmad Mustain Othman	PH (AMANAH)
14th	N20	2020	Ahmad Mustain Othman	Independent
14th	N20	2020–2023	Ahmad Mustain Othman	PH (PKR)
15th	N20	2023–present	Sallehen Mukhyi	PN (PAS)

== Election results ==
Selangor state election, 2023
Party	Candidate	Votes	%	∆%
PN	Sallehen Mukhyi	13,431	59.31	▲59.31
PH	Samad Hashim	9,216	40.69	▲40.69
Total valid votes		22,647	100.00	
Total rejected ballots		154		
Unreturned ballots		18		
Turnout		22,819	71.72	▼11.31
Registered electors		31,816		
Majority		4,215	18.62	▲17.97
PN gain from PKR		Swing		?

Selangor state election, 2018
Party	Candidate	Votes	%	∆%
PKR	Ahmad Mustain Othman	6,981	34.88	▲34.88
BN	Sallehuddin Mohd Iskan	6,851	34.23	▼14.69
PAS	Sallehen Mukhyi	6,183	30.89	▼20.19
Total valid votes		20,015	100.00	
Total rejected ballots		327		
Unreturned ballots		75		
Turnout		20,417	83.03	▼2.09
Registered electors		24,589		
Majority		130	0.65	▼1.51
PKR gain from PAS		Swing		?

Selangor state election, 2013
Party	Candidate	Votes	%	∆%
PAS	Sallehen Mukhyi	9,421	51.08	▲1.50
BN	Abdul Halim Udin	9,022	48.92	▼1.50
Total valid votes		18,443	100.00	
Total rejected ballots		299		
Unreturned ballots		95		
Turnout		18,837	85.12	▲8.33
Registered electors		22,131		
Majority		399	2.16	▲1.32
PAS gain from BN		Swing		?
Source(s) "Federal Government Gazette - Notice of Contested Election, State Legislative Assembly for the State of Selangor [P.U. (B) 192/2013]" (PDF). Attorney General's Chambers of Malaysia. 26 April 2013. Archived from the original (PDF) on 2019-12-29. "Federal Government Gazette - Results of Contested Election and Statements of the Poll after the Official Addition of Votes, State Constituencies for the State of Selangor [P.U. (B) 233/2013]". Attorney General's Chambers of Malaysia. 22 May 2013. Archived from the original (PDF) on 2018-10-02.

Selangor state election, 2008
Party	Candidate	Votes	%	∆%
BN	Warno Dogol	7,001	50.42	▼7.95
PAS	Sallehen Mukhyi	6,884	49.58	▲7.95
Total valid votes		13,885	100.00	
Total rejected ballots		390		
Unreturned ballots		50		
Turnout		14,325	76.79	▲1.16
Registered electors		18,655		
Majority		117	0.84	▼15.90
BN hold		Swing		

Selangor state election, 2004
Party	Candidate	Votes	%	∆%
BN	Raja Ideris Raja Ahmad	7,864	58.37	▲3.81
PAS	Sallehen Mukhyi	5,608	41.63	▼3.81
Total valid votes		13,472	100.00	
Total rejected ballots		329		
Unreturned ballots		3		
Turnout		13,804	75.63	▲8.20
Registered electors		18,251		
Majority		2,256	16.74	▲7.62
BN hold		Swing		

Selangor state election, 1999
Party	Candidate	Votes	%	∆%
BN	Raja Ideris Raja Ahmad	3,679	54.56	▼31.72
PAS	Mohamad Yunos	3,064	45.44	▲45.44
Total valid votes		6,743	100.00	
Total rejected ballots		233		
Unreturned ballots		6		
Turnout		6,982	67.43	▲4.01
Registered electors		10,355		
Majority		615	9.12	▼63.44
BN hold		Swing		

Selangor state election, 1995
Party	Candidate	Votes	%	∆%
BN	Raja Ideris Raja Ahmad	5,534	86.28	▲11.49
S46	Idris Omar	880	13.72	▼7.64
Total valid votes		6,414	100.00	
Total rejected ballots		325		
Unreturned ballots		12		
Turnout		6,751	63.42	▼5.08
Registered electors		10,645		
Majority		4,654	72.56	▲19.13
BN hold		Swing		

Selangor state election, 1990
Party	Candidate	Votes	%	∆%
BN	Raja Ideris Raja Ahmad	5,357	74.79	▲0.05
S46	Khalid Siri	1,530	21.36	▲21.36
Independent	Othman Mohd @ Kudu	276	3.85	▲3.85
Total valid votes		7,163	100.00	
Total rejected ballots		385		
Unreturned ballots		0		
Turnout		7,548	68.50	▲3.53
Registered electors		11,019		
Majority		3,827	53.43	▲3.95
BN hold		Swing		

Selangor state election, 1986
Party	Candidate	Votes	%	∆%
BN	Mohamad Yusof Abdul Latif	4,740	74.74	▼9.35
PAS	Ariffin Ayob	1,602	25.26	▲9.35
Total valid votes		6,342	100.00	
Total rejected ballots		300		
Unreturned ballots		0		
Turnout		6,642	64.97	▼2.94
Registered electors		10,223		
Majority		3,138	49.48	▼18.70
BN hold		Swing		

Selangor state election, 1982
Party	Candidate	Votes	%	∆%
BN	Mohamad Yusof Abdul Latif	5,376	84.09	▲13.66
PAS	Basran Abdul Rahman	1,017	15.91	▼13.66
Total valid votes		6,393	100.00	
Total rejected ballots		272		
Unreturned ballots		0		
Turnout		6,665	67.91	▼0.30
Registered electors		9,815		
Majority		4,359	68.18	▲27.32
BN hold		Swing		

Selangor state election, 1978
Party	Candidate	Votes	%	∆%
BN	Mohamad Yusof Abdul Latif	3,978	70.43	▲0.61
PAS	Ariffin Ayob	1,670	29.57	▲5.27
Total valid votes		5,648	100.00	
Total rejected ballots		476		
Unreturned ballots		0		
Turnout		6,124	68.20	▼0.99
Registered electors		8,979		
Majority		2,308	40.86	▼3.66
BN hold		Swing		

Selangor state election, 1974
Party	Candidate	Votes	%	∆%
BN	Lope Salleh Long @ Zainal Abidin	3,160	69.82	▼3.14
Independent	Mohamed Toha Mohamed Awan	1,145	25.30	▼1.74
PEKEMAS	Haron Babar	221	4.88	▲4.88
Total valid votes		4,526	100.00	
Total rejected ballots		560		
Unreturned ballots		0		
Turnout		5,086	67.89	▼2.51
Registered electors		7,491		
Majority		2,015	44.52	▼1.40
BN gain from Alliance		Swing		?

Selangor state election, 1969
Party	Candidate	Votes	%	∆%
Alliance	Lope Salleh Long @ Zainal Abidin	6,284	72.96	▼11.70
PMIP	Khalil Ahmad Sumari	2,329	27.04	▲11.70
Total valid votes		8,613	100.00	
Total rejected ballots		1,069		
Unreturned ballots		0		
Turnout		9,682	70.40	▼6.06
Registered electors		13,752		
Majority		3,955	45.92	▼23.40
Alliance hold		Swing		

Selangor state election, 1964
Party	Candidate	Votes	%	∆%
Alliance	Lope Salleh Long @ Zainal Abidin	6,624	84.66	▲4.70
PMIP	Mohamed Zaini Sanusi	1,200	15.34	▼4.70
Total valid votes		7,824	100.00	
Total rejected ballots		703		
Unreturned ballots		0		
Turnout		8,527	76.46	▲7.57
Registered electors		11,152		
Majority		5,424	69.32	▲3.75
Alliance hold		Swing		

Selangor state election, 1959
Party	Candidate	Votes	%
Alliance	Mustafa Abdul Jabar	5,378	79.96
PMIP	Mohamed Janah Sabun	968	14.39
Independent	Jaafar Ali	380	5.65
Total valid votes		6,726	100.00
Total rejected ballots		210	
Unreturned ballots		0	
Turnout		6,936	68.69
Registered electors		10,097	
Majority		4,410	65.57
This was a new constituency created.
