= Mohd Razali Saari =

Malaysian politician

Yang Berhormat Tuan Mohd Razali Saari MLA
- محمد غزالي شعاري

Member of the Selangor State Legislative Assembly for Sungai Panjang
- Incumbent
- Assumed office 12 August 2023
- Preceded by: Mohd Imran Tamrin (BN–UMNO)
- Majority: 3,576 (2023)

Personal details
- Born: Mohd Razali bin Saari
- Citizenship: Malaysian
- Party: Malaysian Islamic Party (PAS)
- Other political affiliations: Gagasan Sejahtera (GS) (2016–2020); Perikatan Nasional (PN) (since 2020)
- Occupation: Politician

Mohd Razali bin Saari is a Malaysian politician who has served as Member of the Selangor State Legislative Assembly (MLA) for Sungai Panjang since August 2023. He is a member of the Malaysian Islamic Party (PAS), a component party of the Perikatan Nasional (PN) and formerly Gagasan Sejahtera (GS) coalitions.

== Political career ==
=== Candidate for the Member of the Selangor State Legislative Assembly (2018) ===
==== 2018 Selangor state election ====
In the 2018 Selangor state election, Mohd Razali made his electoral debut after being nominated by GS to contest the Sungai Panjang state seat. Mohd Razali lost to Mohd Imran Tamrin of Barisan Nasional (BN) by a minority of 3,531 votes.

=== Member of the Selangor State Legislative Assembly (since 2023) ===
==== 2023 Selangor state election ====
In the 2023 Selangor state election, Mohd Razali was nominated by PN to contest the Sungai Panjang seat again. Mohd Razali won the seat and was elected to the Selangor State Legislative Assembly as the Sungai Panjang MLA for the first term after defeating defending MLA Mohd Imran of BN by a majority of 3,576 votes.

== Election results ==
Selangor State Legislative Assembly
Year	Constituency	Candidate	Votes	Pct	Opponent(s)	Votes	Pct	Ballots cast	Majority	Turnout
2018	N03 Sungai Panjang	Mohd Razali Saari (PAS)	6,999	26.95%						
2018	N03 Sungai Panjang	Mohd Razali Saari (PAS)	6,999	26.95%	Mohd Imran Tamrin (UMNO)	10,530	40.53%	25,975	2,084	86.19%
2018	N03 Sungai Panjang	Mohd Razali Saari (PAS)	6,999	26.95%	Mariam Abdul Rashid (AMANAH)	8,446	32.52%	25,975	2,084	86.19%
2023	N03 Sungai Panjang	Mohd Razali Saari (PAS)	16,977	55.89%	Mohd Imran Tamrin (UMNO)	13,401	44.11%	30,378	3,576	74.48%
