= Sungai Panjang =

Sungai Panjang is a mukim in Sabak Bernam District, Selangor, Malaysia.

== Notable residents ==
- Dr Mohammad Khir Toyo former Menteri Besar (First Minister) of Selangor
