= Sungai Panjang (state constituency) =

State constituency in Selangor

Sungai Panjang (N03)
Selangor constituency

State constituency
- Legislature: Selangor State Legislative Assembly
MLA
Mohd Razali Saari
PN
- Constituency created: 1974
- First contested: 1974
- Last contested: 2023

Demographics
- Electors (2023): 40,786

Sungai Panjang is a state constituency in Selangor, Malaysia, that has been represented in the Selangor State Legislative Assembly since 1974. It has been represented by Mohd Razali Saari of Perikatan Nasional (PN) since 2023.

The state constituency was created in the 1974 redistribution and is mandated to return a single member to the Selangor State Legislative Assembly under the first past the post voting system.

== Demographics ==
Ethnic breakdown of Sungai Panjang's electorate as of 2023
1. Malay (81.3%)
2. Chinese (16.1%)
3. Indian (1.58%)
4. Other ethnicities (1.09%)

== History ==
=== Polling districts ===
According to the federal gazette issued on 30 March 2018, the Sungai Panjang constituency is divided into 19 polling districts.

State constituency	Polling districts	Code	Location
Sungai Panjang（N03）	Parit 16-Belia 2	093/03/01	SK Binjai Jaya
Sungai Panjang（N03）	Parit 13-15 Sungai Panjang	093/03/02	SK Tok Khalifah Sungai Besar
Sungai Panjang（N03）	Parit 6-12 Sungai Panjang	093/03/03	KAFA Integrasi Kampung Desa Permai Parit 8 Sungai Panjang
Sungai Panjang（N03）	Parit 2-5 Sungai Panjang	093/03/04	SK Parit Empat Sungai Panjang
Sungai Panjang（N03）	Pekan Sungai Besar	093/03/05	SK Seri Utama Sungai Besar
Sungai Panjang（N03）	Bagan Sungai Besar	093/03/06	Balai Raya Bagan Sungai Besar
Sungai Panjang（N03）	Parit Satu Timur	093/03/07	SMK Sungai Besar
Sungai Panjang（N03）	Sungai Limau	093/03/08	SK Sungai Limau Sungai Besar
Sungai Panjang（N03）	Sungai Haji Dorani	093/03/09	SK Sungai Haji Dorani
Sungai Panjang（N03）	Peket Enam Puluh	093/03/10	Balai Raya Peket 60 Sungai Nipah
Sungai Panjang（N03）	Simpang Lima	093/03/11	SK Simpang Lima Sungai Besar
Sungai Panjang（N03）	Parit 13 Sungai Nipah	093/03/12	SK Parit 13 Sungai Nipah
Sungai Panjang（N03）	Sungai Nipah	093/03/13	SRA Simpang Lima
Sungai Panjang（N03）	Sungai Nibong	093/03/14	SK Sungai Nibong
Sungai Panjang（N03）	Pasir Panjang Tengah	093/03/15	Dewan Dato' Muhd. Fauzi Pasir Panjang
Sungai Panjang（N03）	Pasir Panjang Selatan	093/03/16	SK Pasir Panjang
Sungai Panjang（N03）	Taman Berkat	093/03/17	Mini Stadium Sungai Besar
Sungai Panjang（N03）	Parit 6-12 Timur	093/03/18	SRA Parit 11 Timur
Sungai Panjang（N03）	Kampung Baharu Nelayan	093/03/19	SMA Tengku Ampuan Jemaah Sungai Besar

=== Representation history ===
Members of the Legislative Assembly for Sungai Panjang
Assembly	No	Years	Member	Party
Constituency created from Sungei Besar
Sungei Panjang
4th	N04	1974-1978	Hamdan Bakri	BN (UMNO)
5th	N04	1978-1982	Ariffin Mat Rawi	BN (UMNO)
6th	N04	1982-1986	Ariffin Mat Rawi	BN (UMNO)
Sungai Panjang
7th	N04	1986-1990	Ariffin Mat Rawi	BN (UMNO)
8th	N04	1990-1995	Mohd Pauzi Abdul Murad	BN (UMNO)
9th	N04	1995-1999	Mohd Pauzi Abdul Murad	BN (UMNO)
10th	N04	1999-2004	Mohamed Khir Toyo	BN (UMNO)
11th	N03	2004-2008	Mohamed Khir Toyo	BN (UMNO)
12th	N03	2008-2013	Mohamed Khir Toyo	BN (UMNO)
13th	N03	2013-2018	Budiman Mohd Zohdi	BN (UMNO)
14th	N03	2018–2023	Mohd Imran Tamrin	BN (UMNO)
15th	N03	2023–present	Mohd Razali Saari	PN (PAS)

== Election results ==
Selangor state election, 2023
Party	Candidate	Votes	%	∆%
PN	Mohd Razali Saari	16,977	55.89	▲55.89
BN	Mohd Imran Tamrin	13,401	44.11	▲3.58
Total valid votes		30,378	100.00	
Total rejected ballots		206		
Unreturned ballots		135		
Turnout		30,719	75.32	▼10.87
Registered electors		40,786		
Majority		3,576	11.78	▲3.77
PN gain from BN		Swing		?

Selangor state election, 2018
Party	Candidate	Votes	%	∆%
BN	Mohd Imran Tamrin	10,530	40.53	▼14.21
PKR	Mariam Abdul Rashid	8,446	32.52	▲32.52
PAS	Mohd Razali Saari	6,999	26.95	▼18.31
Total valid votes		25,975	100.00	
Total rejected ballots		362		
Unreturned ballots		71		
Turnout		26,408	86.19	▼2.17
Registered electors		30,638		
Majority		2,084	8.01	▼1.47
BN hold		Swing		

Selangor state election, 2013
Party	Candidate	Votes	%	∆%
BN	Budiman Mohd Zohdi	12,606	54.74	▼12.88
PAS	Mohd Fadzin Taslimin	10,423	45.26	▲12.88
Total valid votes		23,029	100.00	
Total rejected ballots		374		
Unreturned ballots		93		
Turnout		23,496	88.36	▲5.89
Registered electors		26,590		
Majority		2,183	9.48	▼25.76
BN hold		Swing		
Source(s) "Federal Government Gazette - Notice of Contested Election, State Legislative Assembly for the State of Selangor [P.U. (B) 192/2013]" (PDF). Attorney General's Chambers of Malaysia. 26 April 2013. "Federal Government Gazette - Results of Contested Election and Statements of the Poll after the Official Addition of Votes, State Constituencies for the State of Selangor [P.U. (B) 233/2013]" (PDF). Attorney General's Chambers of Malaysia. 22 May 2013.

Selangor state election, 2008
Party	Candidate	Votes	%	∆%
BN	Mohamed Khir Toyo	11,181	67.62	▼1.96
PAS	Mohd Fadzin Taslimin	5,353	32.38	▲1.96
Total valid votes		16,534	100.00	
Total rejected ballots		319		
Unreturned ballots		53		
Turnout		16,906	82.47	▲3.43
Registered electors		20,500		
Majority		5,828	35.24	▼3.92
BN hold		Swing		

Selangor state election, 2004
Party	Candidate	Votes	%	∆%
BN	Mohamed Khir Toyo	9,700	69.58	▲18.59
PAS	Saibini Ismail	4,240	30.42	▼18.59
Total valid votes		13,940	100.00	
Total rejected ballots		329		
Unreturned ballots				
Turnout		14,269	79.04	▲7.27
Registered electors		18,052		
Majority		5,460	39.16	▲37.18
BN hold		Swing		

Selangor state election, 1999
Party	Candidate	Votes	%	∆%
BN	Mohamed Khir Toyo	4,243	50.99	▲50.99
PAS	Mohd Fadzin Taslimin	4,078	49.01	▲49.01
Total valid votes		8,321	100.00	
Total rejected ballots		298		
Unreturned ballots		3		
Turnout		8,622	71.77	▲71.77
Registered electors		12,013		
Majority		165	1.98	▲1.98
BN hold		Swing		

Selangor state election, 1995
Party	Candidate	Votes	%	∆%
On the nomination day, Mohd Pauzi Abdul Murad won uncontested.
BN	Mohd Pauzi Abdul Murad			
Total valid votes			100.00	
Total rejected ballots				
Unreturned ballots				
Turnout				
Registered electors		13,687		
Majority				
BN hold		Swing		

Selangor state election, 1990
Party	Candidate	Votes	%	∆%
BN	Mohd Pauzi Abdul Murad	6,007	81.26	▲5.27
S46	Baharuddin Arif Siri	1,385	18.74	▲18.74
Total valid votes		7,392	100.00	
Total rejected ballots		524		
Unreturned ballots		0		
Turnout		7,916	72.25	▲9.46
Registered electors		10,956		
Majority		4,622	62.52	▲10.54
BN hold		Swing		

Selangor state election, 1986
Party	Candidate	Votes	%	∆%
BN	Ariffin Mat Rawi	4,936	75.99	▼1.18
PAS	Abdul Rahman Awang	1,560	24.01	▲1.18
Total valid votes		6,496	100.00	
Total rejected ballots		351		
Unreturned ballots		0		
Turnout		6,847	62.79	▼2.32
Registered electors		10,905		
Majority		3,376	51.98	▼2.36
BN hold		Swing		

Selangor state election, 1982: Sungei Panjang
Party	Candidate	Votes	%	∆%
BN	Ariffin Mat Rawi	5,282	77.17	▲11.05
PAS	Abdul Manaf Abdullah	1,563	22.83	▼11.05
Total valid votes		6,845	100.00	
Total rejected ballots		218		
Unreturned ballots		0		
Turnout		7,063	65.11	▲1.47
Registered electors		10,847		
Majority		3,719	54.33	▲22.09
BN hold		Swing		

Selangor state election, 1978: Sungei Panjang
Party	Candidate	Votes	%	∆%
BN	Ariffin Mat Rawi	4,038	66.12	▲66.12
PAS	Hamdan Bakri	2,069	33.88	▲33.88
Total valid votes		6,107	100.00	
Total rejected ballots		464		
Unreturned ballots		0		
Turnout		6,571	63.65	▲63.65
Registered electors		10,324		
Majority		1,969	32.24	▲32.24
BN hold		Swing		

Selangor state election, 1974: Sungei Panjang
Party	Candidate	Votes	%
On the nomination day, Hamdan Bakri won uncontested.
BN	Hamdan Bakri		
Total valid votes			100.00
Total rejected ballots			
Unreturned ballots			
Turnout			
Registered electors		8,380	
Majority			
This was a new constituency created.
