= Sungai Besar (federal constituency) =

Federal constituency of Selangor, Malaysia

Sungai Besar (P093)
Selangor constituency

Federal constituency
- Legislature: Dewan Rakyat
- MP: Muslimin Yahaya; PN
- Constituency created: 2003
- First contested: 2004
- Last contested: 2022

Demographics
- Population (2020): 58,955
- Electors (2023): 64,722
- Area (km²): 639
- Pop. density (per km²): 92.3

Sungai Besar is a federal constituency in Sabak Bernam District, Selangor, Malaysia, that has been represented in the Dewan Rakyat since 2004.

The federal constituency was created in the 2003 redistribution and is mandated to return a single member to the Dewan Rakyat under the first past the post voting system.

== Demographics ==
Ethnic breakdown of Sungai Besar's electorate as of 2018
1. Malay (68.4%)
2. Chinese (29.4%)
3. Indian (2.00%)
4. Other ethnicities (0.20%)
Age breakdown of Sungai Besar's electorate as of 2022
1. 18-20 (5.95%)
2. 21-29 (22.2%)
3. 30-39 (24.1%)
4. 40-49 (16.9%)
5. 50-59 (14.6%)
6. 60-69 (9.42%)
7. 70-79 (4.92%)
8. 80-89 (1.48%)
9. above 90 (0.28%)
Gender breakdown of Sungai Besar's electorate as of 2022
1. Male (50.5%)
2. Female (49.5%)

== History ==
=== Polling districts ===
According to the federal gazette issued on 18 July 2023, the Sungai Besar constituency is divided into 30 polling districts.

State constituency	Polling districts	Code	Location
Sungai Panjang（N03）	Parit 16-Belia 2	093/03/01	SK Binjai Jaya
Sungai Panjang（N03）	Parit 13-15 Sungai Panjang	093/03/02	SK Tok Khalifah Sungai Besar
Sungai Panjang（N03）	Parit 6-12 Sungai Panjang	093/03/03	KAFA Integrasi Kampung Desa Permai Parit 8 Sungai Panjang
Sungai Panjang（N03）	Parit 2-5 Sungai Panjang	093/03/04	SRA Parit Empat Sungai Haji Dorani
Sungai Panjang（N03）	Pekan Sungai Besar	093/03/05	SK Seri Utama Sungai Besar
Sungai Panjang（N03）	Bagan Sungai Besar	093/03/06	Balai Raya Bagan Sungai Besar
Sungai Panjang（N03）	Parit Satu Timur	093/03/07	SMK Sungai Besar
Sungai Panjang（N03）	Sungai Limau	093/03/08	SK Sungai Limau Sungai Besar
Sungai Panjang（N03）	Sungai Haji Dorani	093/03/09	SK Sungai Haji Dorani
Sungai Panjang（N03）	Peket Enam Puluh	093/03/10	SK Parit Empat, Sungai Besar
Sungai Panjang（N03）	Simpang Lima	093/03/11	SK Simpang Lima Sungai Besar
Sungai Panjang（N03）	Parit 13 Sungai Nipah	093/03/12	SK Parit 13 Sungai Nipah
Sungai Panjang（N03）	Sungai Nipah	093/03/13	SMA Tun Rahah
Sungai Panjang（N03）	Sungai Nibong	093/03/14	SK Sungai Nibong
Sungai Panjang（N03）	Pasir Panjang Tengah	093/03/15	Dewan Dato' Muhd. Fauzi Pasir Panjang
Sungai Panjang（N03）	Pasir Panjang Selatan	093/03/16	SK Pasir Panjang
Sungai Panjang（N03）	Taman Berkat	093/03/17	Mini Stadium Sungai Besar
Sungai Panjang（N03）	Parit 6-12 Timur	093/03/18	SRA Parit 11 Timur
Sungai Panjang（N03）	Kampung Baharu Nelayan	093/03/19	SMA Tengku Ampuan Jemaah Sungai Besar
Sekinchan（N04）	Sungai Leman Bendang Utara	093/04/01	SK Parit 9 Sungai Leman Sekinchan
Sekinchan（N04）	Sungai Leman Bendang Tengah	093/04/02	SK Parit 9 Sungai Leman Sekinchan
Sekinchan（N04）	Sungai Leman Bendang Selatan	093/04/03	SRA Parit 7 Ban 2 Sungai Leman
Sekinchan（N04）	Sungai Leman Kampung Darat	093/04/04	SK Sungai Leman
Sekinchan（N04）	Sungai Leman Kampung Laut	093/04/05	SRA Parit 9 Sungai Leman Sekinchan
Sekinchan（N04）	Sekinchan Selatan	093/04/06	SJK (C) Yoke Kuan Sekinchan
Sekinchan（N04）	Sekinchan Tempatan Selatan	093/04/07	SRA Harmoni Taman Ria
Sekinchan（N04）	Sekinchan Tempatan Tengah	093/04/08	SMJK Yoke Kuan Sekinchan
Sekinchan（N04）	Sekinchan Tempatan (Site B)	093/04/09	SMJK Yoke Kuan Sekinchan
Sekinchan（N04）	Kian Sit	093/04/10	SJK (C) Kian Sit
Sekinchan（N04）	Sekinchan	093/04/11	SK Seri Sekinchan

=== Representation history ===
Members of Parliament for Sungai Besar
Parliament	No	Years	Member	Party	Vote Share
Constituency created from Tanjong Karang
11th	P093	2004–2008	Noriah Kasnon (نوريه كسنون)	BN (UMNO)	15,337; 65.75%
12th	P093	2008–2013	Noriah Kasnon (نوريه كسنون)	BN (UMNO)	16,069; 59.23%
13th	P093	2013–2016	Noriah Kasnon (نوريه كسنون)	BN (UMNO)	18,695; 50.54%
13th	P093	2016–2018	Budiman Mohd Zohdi (بوديمن محمد زهدي)	BN (UMNO)	16,800; 53.66%
14th	P093	2018–2020	Muslimin Yahaya (مسلمين يحيى)	PH (BERSATU)	17,350; 42.11%
14th	P093	2020–2022	Muslimin Yahaya (مسلمين يحيى)	PN (BERSATU)	17,350; 42.11%
15th	P093	2022–present	Muslimin Yahaya (مسلمين يحيى)	PN (BERSATU)	19,791; 38.75%

=== State constituency ===
Parliamentary constituency	State constituency						
Parliamentary constituency	1955–59*	1959–1974	1974–1986	1986–1995	1995–2004	2004–2018	2018–present
Sungai Besar						Sekinchan	
Sungai Besar						Sungai Panjang	

=== Historical boundaries ===
State Constituency	Area	
State Constituency	2003	2018
Sekinchan	Kampung Tali Air; Taman Aman; Taman Indah; Sekinchan Site A-C; Sungai Leman	
Sungai Panjang	Pasir Panjang; Simpang Lima; Sungai Besar; Sungai Nipah; Sungai Panjang	

=== Current state assembly members ===
No.	State Constituency	Member	Coalition (Party)
N03	Sungai Panjang	Mohd Razali Saari	PN (PAS)
N04	Sekinchan	Ng Suee Lim	PH (DAP)

=== Local governments & postcodes ===
No.	State Constituency	Local Government	Postcode
N03	Sungai Panjang	Sabak Bernam District Council	45300 Sungai Besar; 45400 Sekinchan
N04	Sekinchan	Sabak Bernam District Council	45300 Sungai Besar; 45400 Sekinchan

== Election results ==
Malaysian general election, 2022
Party	Candidate	Votes	%	∆%
PN	Muslimin Yahaya	19,791	38.75	▲38.75
PH	Saipolyazan Mat Yusop	17,070	33.42	▲33.42
BN	Jamal Yunos	13,984	27.38	▼12.99
PEJUANG	Asmawar Samat @ Samad	225	0.44	▲0.44
Total valid votes		51,070	100.00	
Total rejected ballots		441		
Unreturned ballots		83		
Turnout		51,594	79.32	▼6.60
Registered electors		64,382		
Majority		2,721	5.33	▲3.60
PN gain from PKR		Swing		?
Source(s) https://lom.agc.gov.my/ilims/upload/portal/akta/outputp/1753283/PUB612.pdf

Malaysian general election, 2018
Party	Candidate	Votes	%	∆%
PKR	Muslimin Yahaya	17,350	42.11	▲42.11
BN	Budiman Mohd Zohdi	16,636	40.37	▼13.29
PAS	Mohamed Salleh M Husin	7,220	17.52	▼4.52
Total valid votes		41,206	100.00	
Total rejected ballots		564		
Unreturned ballots		108		
Turnout		41,878	85.92	▲10.92
Registered electors		48,739		
Majority		714	1.73	▼27.63
PKR gain from BN		Swing		?
Source(s) "His Majesty's Government Gazette - Notice of Contested Election, Parliament for the State of Selangor [P.U. (B) 239/2018]" (PDF). Attorney General's Chambers of Malaysia. 3 May 2018. Archived from the original (PDF) on 2019-07-19. "Federal Government Gazette - Results of Contested Election and Statements of the Poll after the Official Addition of Votes, Parliamentary Constituencies for the State of Selangor [P.U. (B) 313/2018]" (PDF). Attorney General's Chambers of Malaysia. 28 May 2018. Archived from the original (PDF) on 2019-07-19.

Malaysian general by-election, 18 June 2016 The by-election was called due to the death of incumbent, Noriah Kasnon.
Party	Candidate	Votes	%	∆%
BN	Budiman Mohd Zohdi	16,800	53.66	▲3.12
Amanah	Azhar Abdul Shukur	7,609	24.30	▲24.30
PAS	Abdul Rani Osman	6,902	22.04	▼27.42
Total valid votes		31,311	100.00	
Total rejected ballots		379		
Unreturned ballots		31		
Turnout		31,721	74.37	▼13.89
Registered electors		42,655		
Majority		9,191	29.36	▲28.28
BN hold		Swing		
Source(s) "Pilihan Raya Kecil P.093 Sungai Besar". Election Commission of Malaysia. "Federal Government Gazette - Notice of Contested Election - By-election of the Dewan Rakyat of P.093 Sungai Besar for the State of Selangor [P.U. (B) 270/2016]" (PDF). Attorney General's Chambers of Malaysia. 6 June 2016. "Federal Government Gazette - Results of Contested Election and Statement of the Poll after the Official Addition of Votes for the By-election of P.093 Sungai Besar [P. U. (B) 299/2016]" (PDF). Attorney General's Chambers of Malaysia. 23 June 2016.

Malaysian general election, 2013
Party	Candidate	Votes	%	∆%
BN	Noriah Kasnon	18,695	50.54	▼8.69
PAS	Salleh Husin	18,296	49.46	▲8.69
Total valid votes		36,991	100.00	
Total rejected ballots		690		
Unreturned ballots		129		
Turnout		37,810	88.26	▲6.30
Registered electors		42,837		
Majority		399	1.08	▼17.38
BN hold		Swing		
Source(s) "Federal Government Gazette - Notice of Contested Election, Parliament for the State of Selangor [P.U. (B) 176/2013]" (PDF). Attorney General's Chambers of Malaysia. 26 April 2013. "Federal Government Gazette - Results of Contested Election and Statements of the Poll after the Official Addition of Votes, Parliamentary Constituencies for the State of Selangor [P.U. (B) 217/2013]" (PDF). Attorney General's Chambers of Malaysia. 22 May 2013.

Malaysian general election, 2008
Party	Candidate	Votes	%	∆%
BN	Noriah Kasnon	16,069	59.23	▼6.52
PAS	Osman Sabran	11,060	40.77	▲6.52
Total valid votes		27,129	100.00	
Total rejected ballots		656		
Unreturned ballots		142		
Turnout		27,927	81.96	▲4.16
Registered electors		34,073		
Majority		5,009	18.46	▼13.04
BN hold		Swing		

Malaysian general election, 2004
Party	Candidate	Votes	%
BN	Noriah Kasnon	15,337	65.75
PAS	Sallehen Mukhyi	7,988	34.25
Total valid votes		23,325	100.00
Total rejected ballots		795	
Unreturned ballots		0	
Turnout		24,120	77.80
Registered electors		31,002	
Majority		7,349	31.50
This was a new constituency created out of Tanjong Karang and Sabak Bernam which went to BN in the previous election.
