= Bagan Nakhoda Omar =

Coordinates: 3°46′N 100°53′E

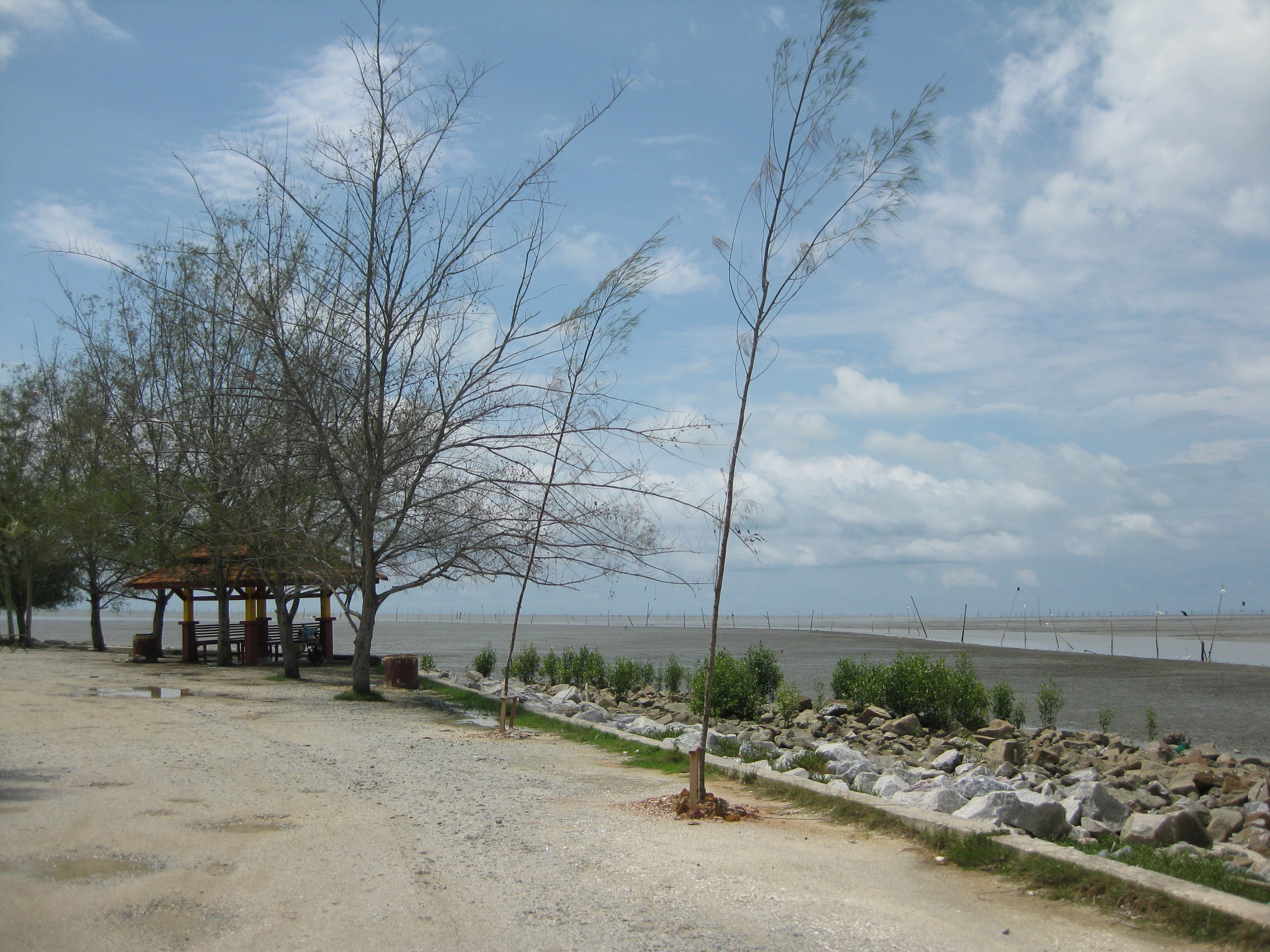
Bagan Nahkoda Omar

Bagan Nakhoda Omar is a mukim and a town in Sabak Bernam District, Selangor, Malaysia.

It is the westernmost and northernmost point of Selangor.
