= Sabak Bernam District =

- District of Selangor
- Daerah Sabak Bernam
- Seal

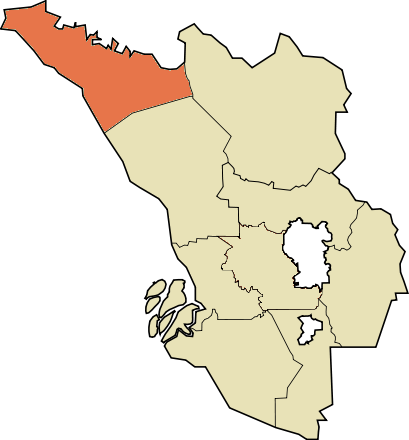
- Location of Sabak Bernam District in Selangor
- Interactive map of Sabak Bernam District
- Location of Sabak Bernam District in Malaysia
- Coordinates: 3°40′N 101°05′E
- Country: Malaysia
- State: Selangor
- Seat: Sungai Besar
- Local area government(s): Sabak Bernam District Council

Government
  - District officer: Nasir Mamat
  - Sultan's Representative: Baharin Mat Akhir

Area
  - Total: 997.1 km^{2} (385.0 sq mi)

Population (2010)
  - Total: 103,153
  - Density: 103.5/km^{2} (267.9/sq mi)
- Time zone: UTC+8 (MST)
  - Summer (DST): UTC+8 (Not observed)
- Postcode: 45xxx
- Calling code: +6-03
- Vehicle registration plates: B

The Sabak Bernam District is a district and a parliamentary constituency in north-western Selangor, Malaysia. It covers an area of 997 square kilometres, and had a population of 103,153 at the 2010 Census (excluding foreigners). It is situated at the northwestern corner of Selangor. It is bordered by the state of Perak to the north, the district of Hulu Selangor to the east, the district of Kuala Selangor to the south, and the Straits of Malacca to the west. Bernam River forms its border with Perak. Towns in Sabak Bernam include Sabak, Sungai Besar and Sekinchan. This area is notable for its high concentration of Javanese migrant descendants in the rural areas officially classified under "Malays" which had worked in as a main source of income.

The district's main economic activity is agriculture, mainly rice-growing; but coconut harvesting is also involved. Sabak Bernam is the westernmost district of Selangor; at 100 km from Kuala Lumpur, it is the furthest district in Selangor from both the national capital Kuala Lumpur as well as the federal administrative center of Putrajaya and state capital Shah Alam.

== Administrative divisions ==

Sabak Bernam District is divided into 5 mukims, which are:

- Bagan Nakhoda Omar
- Panchang Bedena
- Pasir Panjang
- Sabak
- Sungai Panjang

== Demographics ==
Historical population
Year	Pop.	±%
1991	99,824	—
2000	113,245	+13.4%
2010	103,709	−8.4%
2020	107,057	+3.2%

== Federal parliament and state assembly seats ==
Sabak Bernam, Selangor Parliament and State Assembly Electoral Districts

List of Sabak Bernam district representatives in the Federal Parliament (Dewan Rakyat)

Parliament	Seat Name	Member of Parliament	Party
P92	Sabak Bernam	Kalam Salan	Perikatan Nasional (BERSATU)
P93	Sungai Besar	Muslimin Yahaya	Perikatan Nasional (BERSATU)

List of Sabak Bernam district representatives in the State Legislative Assembly (Dewan Negeri Selangor)

Parliament	State	Seat Name	State Assemblyman	Party
P92	N1	Sungai Air Tawar	Rizam bin Ismail	Barisan Nasional (UMNO)
P92	N2	Sabak	ASallehen Mukhyi	Perikatan Nasional (BERSATU)
P93	N3	Sungai Panjang	Mohamad Razali Saari	Perikatan Nasional (BERSATU)
P93	N4	Sekinchan	Ng Suee Lim	Pakatan Harapan (DAP)

== See also ==
- Districts of Malaysia
