= Sungai Besar =

Town in Selangor, Malaysia

Coordinates: 3°40′N 100°59′E

Sungai Besar in Sabak Bernam District

Sungai Besar (Jawi: سوڠاي بسر) is the principal town of Sabak Bernam District, Selangor, Malaysia.

Sungai Besar's population is estimated to be around 23,000 of which 43% are within 20 to 55 years old. From that total, around 73 percent are Malays (Banjar, Jawa, and Kampar descents), Chinese (23%) and Indian (3.5%).

Majority of its people are working as farmers and fisherman, as well as working in coconut, paddy planting, and palm oil plantations. The town becomes the centre of administration for Sabak Bernam district as many government offices and local authority centre are located there.

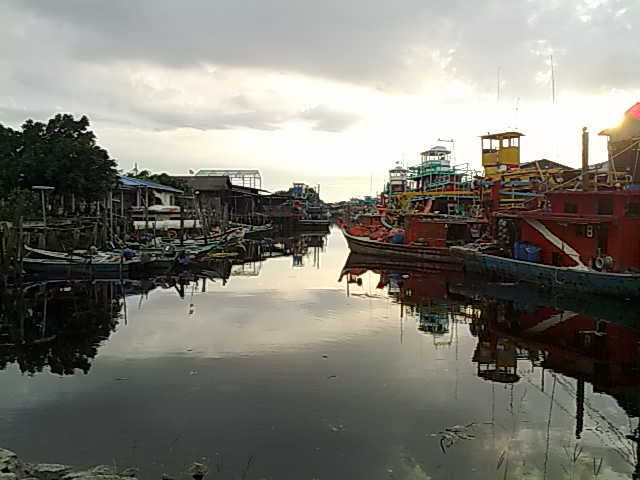
Fishing boats in Sungai Besar

The small village of Sungai Lias is within the town.
