= Badrul Hisham Abdullah =

Malaysian politician

Member of the Selangor State Legislative Assembly for Pelabuhan Klang
- In office 8 May 2008 – 5 May 2013
- Preceded by: Zakaria Md Deros (BN–UMNO)
- Succeeded by: Abdul Khalid Ibrahim (PR–PKR)
- Majority: 4,407 (2008)

Personal details
- Party: People's Justice Party (PKR) (−2009); Independent (2009–2010); United Malays National Organisation (UMNO) (2010–present)
- Other political affiliations: Pakatan Rakyat (PR) (2008–2009); Barisan Nasional (BN) (2010–present)
- Occupation: Politician

Badrul Hisham bin Abdullah is a Malaysian politician. He served as Member of the Selangor State Legislative Assembly (MLA) for Pelabuhan Klang from March 2008 to May 2013. He is a member of United Malays National Organisation (UMNO), a component party of Barisan Nasional (BN) and was a member of People's Justice Party (PKR), a component party of Pakatan Rakyat (PR).

== Political career ==
In 2008 Selangor state election, Badrul was nominated by People's Justice Party (PKR) to contest Pelabuhan Klang state seat. He won the seat with majority of 4,407 and defeat Roselinda Abd Jamil from BN and Nazir Mansor, an independent.

As a representative of the People's Justice Party (PKR), he was accused of rarely visits his constituency and meets with local leaders, let alone learns about the problems faced by the villagers under his responsibility. For example, the actions of Badrul Hisham who broke his promise by not attending the opening of the Port Klang People's Sports Carnival organised by his own office and his decision to cancel the second and third days of the carnival at the last minute were so disappointing and angered the carnival participants including the village heads.

He is said to be dissatisfied with the administration of the Selangor state government led by PKR, DAP and PAS, therefore he was linked to join UMNO but he denied it. Following the rumours, the Selangor People's Justice Party (PKR) suggested Badrul resign from his position if he is no longer able to serve as a representative of the people.

On 29 October 2009, he declared his departure from PKR and became an independent assemblyman. This makes him the fifth Pakatan Rakyat assemblyman to leave the party, after three assemblymen in Perak (two PKR, one DAP) and another PKR assemblyman in Kedah and become an independent representative who supports BN. Badrul also denied that he was involved in an accident and was undergoing psychiatric treatment so that he was unable to look after his constituency. Badrul pointed the finger at Menteri Besar of Selangor, Tan Sri Abdul Khalid Ibrahim, who he claimed also challenged his mental capacity. He who read the prepared statement said Khalid's action, as a PKR leader, was immoral. Badrul also denied that he did not answer the show cause letter from Khalid. On the contrary, he claimed to have answered the show cause letter on September 2. Badrul said he had confirmation of receipt of the reply letter from Khalid's office and the PKR secretary general.

On 30 April 2010, he submitted the form to join UMNO after six months of leaving PKR and becoming an independent Assemblyman and was witnessed by members of UMNO Supreme Council.

== Election results ==
Selangor State Legislative Assembly
Year	Constituency	Candidate	Votes	Pct	Opponent(s)	Votes	Pct	Ballots cast	Majority	Turnout
2008	N46 Pelabuhan Klang	Badrul Hisham Abdullah (PKR)	12,397	59.13%	Roselinda Abd Jamil (UMNO)	7,990	38.11%	21,475	4,407	75.47%
2008	N46 Pelabuhan Klang	Badrul Hisham Abdullah (PKR)	12,397	59.13%	Nazir Mansor (IND)	580	2.77%	21,475	4,407	75.47%
