= Khalid Ibrahim =

Malaysian politician (1946–2022)

Yang Berbahagia Tan Sri Dato' Seri Abdul Khalid Ibrahim PSM SPMS DSAP DPMS
- عبدالخالد إبراهيم
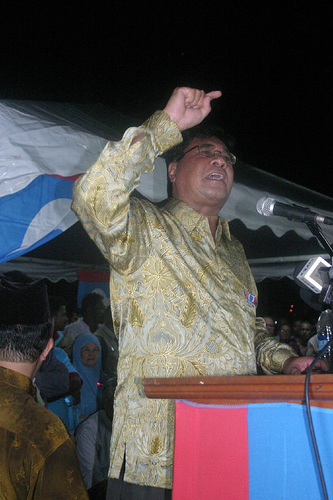
- Khalid Ibrahim in 2007

14th Menteri Besar of Selangor
- In office 13 March 2008 – 22 September 2014
- Monarch: Sultan Sharafuddin Idris Shah
- Preceded by: Khir Toyo
- Succeeded by: Azmin Ali
- Constituency: Ijok (2008–2013); Pelabuhan Klang (2013–2018)

Member of the Malaysian Parliament for Bandar Tun Razak
- In office 8 March 2008 – 9 May 2018
- Preceded by: Tan Chai Ho (BN–MCA)
- Succeeded by: Kamarudin Jaffar (PH–PKR)
- Majority: 2,515 (2008); 11,832 (2013)

Member of the Selangor State Assembly for Pelabuhan Klang
- In office 5 May 2013 – 9 May 2018
- Preceded by: Badrul Hisham Abdullah
- Succeeded by: Azmizam Zaman Huri (PH–PKR)
- Majority: 2,994 (2013)

Member of the Selangor State Assembly for Ijok
- In office 8 March 2008 – 5 May 2013
- Preceded by: Parthiban Karuppiah (BN–MIC)
- Succeeded by: Idris Ahmad (PH–PKR)
- Majority: 1,920 (2008); 2,994 (2013)

Personal details
- Born: Abdul Khalid bin Ibrahim; 14 December 1946 Jeram, Selangor, Malayan Union
- Died: 31 July 2022 (aged 75) Kuala Lumpur, Malaysia
- Resting place: Shah Alam Royal Mausoleum, Selangor
- Party: Independent (1998–2007, 2014–2017, 2018–2022); UMNO (1979–1998, 2017–2018); PKR (2007–2014)
- Other political affiliations: Barisan Nasional (1979–1998, 2017–2018); Pakatan Rakyat (2008–2015)
- Spouse: Salbiah Tunut
- Children: 4
- Education: University of Malaya; University of Queensland
- Occupation: Politician; businessman; lecturer

Abdul Khalid bin Ibrahim (Jawi: عبدالخالد بن إبراهيم; 14 December 1946 – 31 July 2022) was a Malaysian politician who served as the 14th Menteri Besar of Selangor from 2008 to 2014. He was the Member of the Selangor State Assembly (MLA) for Ijok from 2008 to 2013, and MLA for Pelabuhan Klang from 2013 to 2018. At the same time, he served as Member of Parliament (MP) for Bandar Tun Razak from 2013 to 2018.

Khalid was a member of the People's Justice Party (PKR), but became an independent in August 2014, coinciding with his resignation as Menteri Besar. He was sacked from the party for his refusal to vacate his Selangor Menteri Besar post, in a political manoeuvre that was widely criticised by the public and invoked a rare rebuke from the Sultan of Selangor.

During his tenure as Menteri Besar, Khalid prioritised sensible spending of the state government's coffers, initiating many projects and policies that benefitted Selangor state. As a result, he was well-liked by the people of Selangor.

== Early life and education ==
Abdul Khalid bin Ibrahim was born on 14 December 1946 in the village of Kampung Jalan Raja Abdullah in Kuala Selangor, Selangor. He was educated at the Jeram Malay School in 1956, attended the Special Malay Class, and then studied at the Kampung Kuantan English School.

Khalid obtained a Bachelor of Economics (BEc) with honours from the University of Malaya and a Master of Business Administration (MBA) from the University of Queensland in 1975.

== Early career ==
Khalid began his career as a university lecturer before transitioning into the corporate sector. In 1979, he was appointed Chief Executive Officer (CEO) of Permodalan Nasional Berhad (PNB), a government-controlled fund management firm, a position he held until 1994.

== Corporate career ==
During his tenure at PNB, Khalid played a key role in orchestrating the "Dawn Raid" on the London Stock Exchange on 7 September 1981. The operation, executed in less than four hours, allowed PNB to acquire a 51% stake in the British plantation company Guthrie Corporation Limited, effectively transferring ownership of approximately 200,000 acres (800 km²) of agricultural land back to Malaysia. The raid was later described as "the most dramatic Malaysian acquisition of a foreign company during the restructuring of the country’s post-colonial economy," with Khalid playing a central role in its execution.

Following this success, Khalid became the CEO of Kumpulan Guthrie Bhd in 1995, where he served until 2003.

== Political career ==
In 2006, Khalid joined the opposition PKR, founded by the former deputy prime minister Anwar Ibrahim, and became the party's treasurer-general. The party selected him as its candidate for a 2007 Ijok by-election for the Selangor State Legislative Assembly seat of Ijok, which he lost to Parthiban Karuppiah of the Malaysian Indian Congress (MIC), a component party of the ruling Barisan Nasional (BN) coalition.

In the 2008 general election, he contested the federal parliamentary seat of Bandar Tun Razak and re-contested the Selangor State Assembly seat of Ijok. He won both seats, while the opposition Pakatan Rakyat coalition made unprecedented gains and took a majority in the Selangor State Assembly. Khalid was appointed the Menteri Besar of Selangor and was sworn in on 13 March 2008. He was the first person not of the BN coalition to hold the post.

In his first term, Khalid's government implemented a policy of delivering to each Selangor household an initial 20 cubic metres of water each year free of charge. The State Assembly also passed the country's first freedom of information legislation. It was in these areas—social policy and government transparency—that his administration was able to make the most progress. But in some cases, differences between the partners in the governing coalition, which included the Democratic Action Party (DAP) and the Pan-Malaysian Islamic Party (PAS) proved difficult to reconcile. For example, in 2009 Khalid rejected a move by PAS to draft legislation banning the sale of alcohol in Muslim-majority neighbourhoods.

In the 2013 general election, Khalid's Pakatan Rakyat coalition increased its majority in the Selangor State Assembly, winning 44 out of its 56 seats. Though Khalid's PKR won fewer seats than the DAP and PAS, he retained the position of Menteri Besar.

On 2015, Khalid was invited to join Pan-Malaysian Islamic Party (PAS) and there are a few rumours circulating that Khalid may rejoin Barisan Nasional coalition. He rejected the idea of joining any other party, although he expressed willingness to work with PAS: "I have countless times said I am indebted to them when I joined politics. Their action was very precious and I am grateful for that. So don't be afraid that I will join other political parties. No. But I will continue to assist PAS." On matters that would benefit the populace, he declared that he was prepared to work with Barisan Nasional and other groups on both sides of the divide: "Any issues that would bring good to the people of Selangor, such as the much talked about the water industry takeover to be sped up and I am supportive of that. I will stand with any political party on issues that champions for the betterment of the people. I would even ask the three former Menteri Besar's to join me in that cause, even PAS. What I do is important, not where I stand, and it does not mean I support BN or PAS. We do not join politics for the sake of politicking, but we do it for the benefit and justice for the people,"

=== Resignation as Menteri Besar ===
In early 2014, PKR's national leader, Anwar Ibrahim, then a federal parliamentarian, sought to contest the Selangor State Assembly seat of Kajang in a by-election. The so-called "Kajang Move" would have allowed Anwar to oust Khalid as Menteri Besar with PKR's support. Anwar's conviction on a charge of sodomy caused Anwar's wife, Wan Azizah Wan Ismail, to take over Anwar's presidency of PKR and the nomination as PKR candidate in the by-election instead, which she won. In July, the party nominated Wan Azizah as its preferred Menteri Besar. The following month, Khalid was expelled from the party after he refused to comply with its direction for him to resign as the state's premier and make way for Wan Azizah. Khalid sacked the PKR and DAP members of Selangor's Cabinet-like Executive Council, and continued to administer the state as an independent assemblyman with the remaining four councillors from PAS. Khalid ultimately resigned on 26 August 2014, as it was clear that he could no longer command the confidence of the State Assembly. He remained in office while Sultan Sharafuddin deliberated on whom to appoint his replacement, before settling on PKR's deputy president Azmin Ali, who was sworn in on 23 September 2014. After Azmin assumed office, the Sultan praised Khalid for leading the state "successfully and perfectly" and criticised the manner in which he had been ousted from the state's premiership by his own party.

== Death ==
Khalid died of a heart valve infection on 31 July 2022 at 11.08pm at Cardiac Vascular Sentral Hospital, Kuala Lumpur, at age 76. Khalid's remains were brought to the Saidina Umar Al-Khattab Mosque in Bukit Damansara for prayers the next day, before lying in state at the Sultan Salahuddin Abdul Aziz Shah Mosque, Shah Alam, for the public to pay their last respects. At the personal request of the Sultan of Selangor, Sultan Sharafuddin Idris Shah, Khalid was laid to rest at the Shah Alam Royal Mausoleum; burials at the mausoleum are usually reserved for members of the Selangor Royal Family and the nobility. Sultan Sharafuddin and the Tengku Laksamana of Selangor, Tengku Sulaiman Shah, attended the ceremony.

== Legacy and assessment ==
Khalid Ibrahim was the first Menteri Besar of Selangor since independence who was not from the then-dominant Barisan Nasional coalition. As such, his tenure saw radical administrative and policy changes in Selangor. Upon taking office, he applied his corporate experience to his new position, running the state "like a conglomerate". He valued efficiency and hard work, was frugal with state expenditures, and preoccupied with clean governance. Khalid had a propensity for understanding the workings of large organisations, the failings of governments and corporations, and providing solutions thereto. Firmly believing that state monies should go back to the people of Selangor, Khalid initiated the Merakyatkan Ekonomi Selangor ("state revenue channelled back to the people") program, a slogan that was much imitated in the following years. Due to his austere economic policies, Selangor recorded its strongest savings reserves up to that point, amounting to RM3.3 billion by the time he left office in 2014. Khalid also introduced the programme for Selangor households to receive 20 cubic metres of free water every year, a policy that is still in place as at 2022.

Under Khalid's progressive administration, the Selangor Legislative Assembly passed the country’s first freedom of information enactment, in an effort to promote transparent governance and democratisation of information. He also abolished direct negotiations for state projects, and instructed that tenders be awarded based on the collective decision of the executive council and relevant state government officers, without seeking the Menteri Besar's endorsement.

At the same time, his tendency to act independently, as well as his relative indifference to party politics, earned him the enmity of party colleagues. The political machinations that engineered his downfall were not well-received by Selangorians and the Sultan himself, and PKR was criticised for its removal of a highly-regarded Menteri Besar at the height of his popularity. Nevertheless, upon his enforced dismissal, Khalid sat out the rest of his terms as an MP and Member of the Legislative Assembly, whereupon he retired quietly from politics, serving as a consultant to several corporations and state governments. His various policies benefitting the state of Selangor made him beloved among many Selangorians, and he was widely mourned upon his passing, his death being seen as a great loss to the state.

== Election results ==
Selangor State Legislative Assembly
Year	Constituency	Candidate	Votes	Pct	Opponent(s)	Votes	Pct	Ballots cast	Majority	Turnout
2007	N11 Ijok	Abdul Khalid Ibrahim (PKR)	4,034	40.67%	Parthiban Karuppiah (MIC)	5,884	59.33%	10,052	1,850	81.90%
2008	N11 Ijok	Abdul Khalid Ibrahim (PKR)	7,196	57.70%	Mohamed Sayuti Said (UMNO)	5,276	42.30%	12,684	1,920	82.01%
2013	N46 Pelabuhan Klang	Abdul Khalid Ibrahim (PKR)	18,591	54.38%	Nasarruddin M Zin (UMNO)	15,597	45.62%	34,835	2,994	87.15%

Parliament of Malaysia
Year	Constituency	Candidate	Votes	Pct	Opponent(s)	Votes	Pct	Ballots cast	Majority	Turnout
2008	P124 Bandar Tun Razak	Abdul Khalid Ibrahim (PKR)	28,123	52.34%	Tan Chai Ho (MCA)	25,608	47.66%	54,995	2,515	75.72%
2013	P124 Bandar Tun Razak	Abdul Khalid Ibrahim (PKR)	44,067	57.02%	Tan Kok Eng (MCA)	32,235	41.71%	78,157	11,832	85.89%
2013	P124 Bandar Tun Razak	Abdul Khalid Ibrahim (PKR)	44,067	57.02%	Mohamad Sukeri Abdul Samat (IND)	793	1.03%	78,157	11,832	85.89%
2013	P124 Bandar Tun Razak	Abdul Khalid Ibrahim (PKR)	44,067	57.02%	Mokhtar Salahudin (IND)	191	0.25%	78,157	11,832	85.89%

== Honours ==
=== Honours of Malaysia ===
- Malaysia
  - Commander of the Order of Loyalty to the Crown of Malaysia (PSM) – Tan Sri (1998)
- Pahang
  - Knight Companion of the Order of Sultan Ahmad Shah of Pahang (DSAP) – Dato' (1990)
- Selangor
  - Knight Grand Commander of the Order of the Crown of Selangor (SPMS) – Dato' Seri (2009)
  - Knight Commander of the Order of the Crown of Selangor (DPMS) – Dato' (1988)

Political offices
Preceded by Mohamed Khir Toyo	Menteri Besar of Selangor; 13 March 2008 – 22 September 2014	Succeeded by Mohamed Azmin Ali
