= Parthiban Karuppiah =

Malaysian politician

Parthiban Karuppiah KMN AMN
- பார்த்திபன் கருப்பையா

Member of the Selangor State Legislative Assembly for Ijok
- In office 28 April 2007 – 8 March 2008
- Preceded by: Sivalingam Arumugam Karuppiah (BN–MIC)
- Succeeded by: Abdul Khalid Ibrahim (PR–PKR)
- Majority: 1,850 (2007)

Personal details
- Born: Kuala Selangor, Selangor, Malaysia
- Party: Malaysian Indian Congress (MIC) (–2023); Malaysian United Indigenous Party (2023–present)
- Other political affiliations: Barisan Nasional (BN); Perikatan Nasional (PN)
- Education: University of Malaya
- Occupation: Politician, teacher

Parthiban s/o Karuppiah (Tamil: கே. பார்திபன்) is a Malaysian politician of Indian (specifically Tamil) descent, or known as K. Parthiban. He is a member of the Malaysian Indian Congress (MIC), a component party of the ruling Barisan Nasional (BN) coalition, and has been the party's Tanjung Karang division secretary since 2002. In 2003, he was appointed as a special officer to the former Tanjung Karang MP, Datuk Noh Omar.

== Early life ==
Parthiban was born in Ladang Raja Musa, Kuala Selangor district, Selangor. He attended the Seri Kota Teachers' Training College in Kuala Lumpur before enrolling in the University of Malaya, from where he graduated with a Bachelor of Science (B.Sc.) degree and later a Master of Education (M.Ed.) in Education Management.

Parthiban was as a teacher from 1994 to 2006 at various schools in Tanjung Karang and Kuala Selangor prior to entering politics.

== Politic career ==
On 16 April 2007, despite being a relative novice in politics, Parthiban was chosen as the BN candidate in the 2007 Ijok by-election. Parthiban eventually defeated Khalid Ibrahim of Parti Keadilan Rakyat (PKR) in a straight fight.

In the 2008 Malaysian general elections, Parthiban Karuppiah contested in the N10 Bukit Melawati, Selangor State Legislative Assembly and eventually lost to Muthiah a/l Maria Pillay from PKR by a slim majority of 297 votes.

Parthiban was dismissed from MIC after pledge support for PN in 2023 August state election.

== Election results ==
Selangor State Legislative Assembly
| Year | Constituency | Candidate | Votes | Pct | Opponent(s) | Votes | Pct | Ballots cast | Majority | Turnout |
|---|---|---|---|---|---|---|---|---|---|---|
| 2007 | N11 Ijok | Parthiban Karuppiah (MIC) | 5,884 | 59.33% | Abdul Khalid Ibrahim (PKR) | 4,034 | 40.67% | 10,052 | 1,850 | 81.90% |
| 2008 | N10 Bukit Melawati | Parthiban Karuppiah (MIC) | 4,444 | 48.38% | Muthiah Maria Pillay (PKR) | 4,741 | 51.62% | 9,707 | 297 | 75.27% |
| 2013 | N11 Ijok | Parthiban Karuppiah (MIC) | 7,783 | 47.73% | Idris Ahmad (PKR) | 8,522 | 52.27% | 16,638 | 739 | 89.26% |
| 2018 | N11 Ijok | Parthiban Karuppiah (MIC) | 6,800 | 34.46% | Idris Ahmad (PKR) | 8,914 | 45.18% | 20,167 | 2,114 | 87.40% |
| 2018 | N11 Ijok | Parthiban Karuppiah (MIC) | 6,800 | 34.46% | Jefri Mejan (PAS) | 3,942 | 19.98% | 20,167 | 2,114 | 87.40% |
| 2018 | N11 Ijok | Parthiban Karuppiah (MIC) | 6,800 | 34.46% | Kumaran Tamil Dassen (PRM) | 76 | 0.39% | 20,167 | 2,114 | 87.40% |

== Honours ==
- Malaysia
  - Officer of the Order of the Defender of the Realm (KMN) (2014)
  - Member of the Order of the Defender of the Realm (AMN) (2011)
