= Idris Ahmad (Selangor politician) =

Malaysian politician

Member of the Selangor State Legislative Assembly for Ijok
- In office 5 May 2013 – 12 August 2023
- Preceded by: Abdul Khalid Ibrahim (PR–PKR)
- Succeeded by: Jefri Mejan (PN–PAS)
- Majority: 739 (2013); 2,114 (2018)

Personal details
- Born: Idris bin Ahmad; 1948 (age 77–78)
- Party: People's Justice Party (PKR)
- Other political affiliations: Pakatan Rakyat (PR) (2008–2015); Pakatan Harapan (PH) (2015–present)
- Education: MBBS (Monash); FRCOG (UK); FAMM
- Occupation: Politician
- Profession: Medical doctor

Idris bin Ahmad is a Malaysian politician who served as Member of the Selangor State Legislative Assembly for Ijok from May 2013 to August 2023. He is a member of People's Justice Party (PKR), a component party of Pakatan Harapan (PH) and formerly Pakatan Rakyat (PR) coalitions.

== Political career ==
=== Candidate of Menteri Besar of Selangor ===
In June 2018, he was a candidate for the position of Menteri Besar of Selangor and received support from the component parties DAP, BERSATU and AMANAH as well as his own party PKR to replace Mohamed Azmin Ali who was appointed to the position of Minister of Economic Affairs.

However, Selangor Youth and Sports EXCO and Sungai Tua Assemblyman Amirudin Shari was also nominated as the MB of Selangor. The Sultan of Selangor decided to choose Amirudin Shari as Menteri Besar.

Several pro-PKR non-governmental organisations (NGOs) claimed that PKR President Wan Azizah Wan Ismail was biased and insulted Dr. Idris. They claimed that the PKR President had withdrawn her support and stated her support for Amirudin Shari. At the same time, there were allegations of misappropriation of PTPTN funds for Vision College students. A reformist Otai member Abdul Razak Ismail questioned why no PKR leader defended Dr. Idris and argued that the misappropriation was not raised when he was nominated in the GE-14 but only when he was nominated as the Menteri Besar of Selangor. Dr. Idris said he was only a member of the Vision College Board of Trustees with a 35% share but had no interest in the college.

== Election results ==
Selangor State Legislative Assembly
Year	Constituency	Candidate	Votes	Pct	Opponent(s)	Votes	Pct	Ballots cast	Majority	Turnout
2013	N11 Ijok	Idris Ahmad (PKR)	8,522	52.27%	Parthiban Karuppiah (MIC)	7,783	47.73%	16,638	739	89.26%
2018	N11 Ijok	Idris Ahmad (PKR)	8,914	45.18%	Parthiban Karuppiah (MIC)	6,800	34.46%	20,167	2,114	87.40%
2018	N11 Ijok	Idris Ahmad (PKR)	8,914	45.18%	Jefri Mejan (PAS)	3,942	19.98%	20,167	2,114	87.40%
2018	N11 Ijok	Idris Ahmad (PKR)	8,914	45.18%	Kumaran Tamil Dassen (PRM)	76	0.39%	20,167	2,114	87.40%
