= Sivalingam Arumugam =

Malaysian politician

Yang Berbahagia Dato' Sivalingam Arumugam Karuppiah DPMS SSA KMN AMS
- கே. சிவலிங்கம்

Member of the Selangor State Executive Council
- In office 1997 – 4 April 2007
- Monarch: Salahuddin
- Menteri Besar: Abu Hassan Omar (1997–2000); Mohamad Khir Toyo (2000–2007)

Member of the Selangor State Legislative Assembly for Ijok
- In office 25 April 1995 – 4 April 2007
- Preceded by: Constituency created
- Succeeded by: Parthiban Karuppiah (BN–MIC)
- Majority: 6,797 (1995); 3,166 (1999); 1,649 (2004)

Member of the Selangor State Legislative Assembly for Seri Cahaya
- In office 21 October 1990 – 25 April 1995
- Preceded by: M. Mahalingam (BN–MIC)
- Succeeded by: Constituency abolished
- Majority: 1,317 (1990)

Personal details
- Born: Jan 1948 Selangor, Malaysia
- Died: 4 April 2007 (aged 59) Chennai, India
- Party: Malaysian Indian Congress (MIC)
- Other political affiliations: Barisan Nasional (BN)
- Occupation: Politician, Journalist

Sivalingam s/o Arumugam Karuppiah better known as K. Sivalingam (Tamil: கே. சிவலிங்கம்) (January 1948 - 4 April 2007) was a Malaysian politician of Indian descent. He was aligned to the Malaysian Indian Congress (MIC), a major component party of the incumbent Barisan Nasional (BN) coalition, and was the Selangor state MIC deputy chairman.

== Political career ==
Prior to entering politics, Sivalingam was involved in journalism. He joined the MIC in 1968 at the age of 20, and by 1986 he was elected as a senator by the Selangor State Legislative Assembly. Sivalingam contested the Selangor state constituency of Seri Cahaya in the 1990 general election as a rookie candidate and won. In the 1995 general election, he contested the Ijok state constituency and won comfortably, beating a Democratic Action Party (DAP) candidate. In 1997, he was appointed as a member of the Selangor state executive council, a position he held up to his death. He retained the Ijok seat in the 1999 and 2004 general elections.

== Death ==
On 4 April 2007, en route a leisure trip to southern India with his daughter and son-in-law, Sivalingam died from a heart attack in Chennai, India, upon arrival at the Chennai International Airport from Kuala Lumpur. His death prompted the 2007 Ijok by-election to elect a successor representative for his former constituency.

== Election results ==
Selangor State Legislative Assembly
Year	Constituency	Candidate	Votes	Pct	Opponent(s)	Votes	Pct	Ballots cast	Majority	Turnout
1990	N12 Seri Cahaya	Sivalingam Arumugam (MIC)	5,405	55.75%	Mohd Shahir (S46)	4,088	42.17%	10,138	1,317	74.70%
1990	N12 Seri Cahaya	Sivalingam Arumugam (MIC)	5,405	55.75%	Suhaimi Amnan (IND)	202	2.08%	10,138	1,317	74.70%
1995	N11 Ijok	Sivalingam Arumugam (MIC)	8,486	76.02%	Sinniah Periannan (DAP)	1,689	15.13%	11,163	6,797	68.56%
1999	N11 Ijok	Sivalingam Arumugam (MIC)	6,567	58.57%	Krishnan Veeriah (DAP)	3,401	30.33%	11,747	3,166	69.73%
1999	N11 Ijok	Sivalingam Arumugam (MIC)	6,567	58.57%	Mohd Yusof Ab. Rahim (IND)	1,245	11.10%	11,747	3,166	69.73%
2004	N11 Ijok	Sivalingam Arumugam (MIC)	5,213	57.35%	Abdol Raman Moharam (PKR)	3,564	39.21%	9,376	1,649	75.59%
2004	N11 Ijok	Sivalingam Arumugam (MIC)	5,213	57.35%	Mohd Shariff Nagoorkani (IND)	313	3.44%	9,376	1,649	75.59%

== Honours ==
- Malaysia
  - Officer of the Order of the Defender of the Realm (KMN) (1996)
- Selangor
  - Knight Commander of the Order of the Crown of Selangor (DPMS) – Dato' (1999)
  - Companion of the Order of Sultan Salahuddin Abdul Aziz Shah (SSA) (1997)
  - Member of the Order of the Crown of Selangor (AMS) (1988)
