= Jefri Mejan =

Malaysian politician

Yang Berhormat Tuan Jefri Mejan MLA
- جفري ميزان

Member of the Selangor State Legislative Assembly for Ijok
- Incumbent
- Assumed office 12 August 2023
- Preceded by: Idris Ahmad (PH–PKR)
- Majority: 912 (2023)

Personal details
- Born: Jefri bin Mejan; 7 March 1979 (age 47) Ijok, Kuala Selangor, Selangor, Malaysia
- Citizenship: Malaysia
- Party: Malaysian Islamic Party (PAS)
- Other political affiliations: Gagasan Sejahtera (GS) (2016–2020); Perikatan Nasional (PN) (since 2020)
- Spouse: Fadlina Ismail
- Children: 4 (including Nurul Izzah)
- Occupation: Politician
- Profession: Influencer
- Known for: Videos of cooking using wooden stove on TikTok

Jefri bin Mejan (born 7 March 1979) is a Malaysian politician who has served as Member of the Selangor State Legislative Assembly (MLA) for Ijok since August 2023. He is a member of the Malaysian Islamic Party (PAS), a component party of the Perikatan Nasional (PN) and formerly Gagasan Sejahtera (GS) coalitions. He is also an influencer on TikTok and is known for videos of cooking with the traditional method of using a wooden stove which brought back the nostalgia of the past to many netizens.

== Political career ==
In the 2018 Selangor state election, Jefri made his electoral debut after being nominated by Gagasan Sejahtera (GS) to contest for the Ijok state seat. He was not elected to the Selangor State Legislative Assembly as the Ijok MLA after losing to Idris Ahmad of Pakatan Harapan (PH) by a minority of 4,972 votes.

In the 2023 Selangor state election, Jefri was renominated by PN to contest the Ijok state seat. Jefri won the seat and was elected to the Selangor State Legislative Assembly as the Ijok MLA for the first term after narrowly defeating Amidi Abdul Manan of Pakatan Harapan (PH) and independent candidate Tan Cat Keong by a majority of only 912 votes.

During the campaigning period, he admitted that he had personal advantage to win the Ijok seat as he was an Ijok local and had 196,000 followers on TikTok as of July 2023 at the start of the period and he had the full support and prayers of his wife Fadlina Ismail to win the election. As the Ijok MLA, Jefri added that he was determined to realise the #NafasBaharuIjok (#IjokNewBreath in English) commitment together with #SelangorBaharu (#NewSelangor in English) slogan and pay attention to the welfare of the people and the development of Ijok. He aimed to maintain the tradition and image of Ijok in terms of the environment as a peaceful, harmonious and developed village. He also planned to celebrate the diversity in Ijok through programmes and activities involving all levels of society from children, teenagers, adults, women, families, people with disabilities (OKU) to the elderly regardless of their political understandings and affiliations and ensured that nobody was left behind in Ijok.

== Controversies and issues ==
Soon after he was elected as the Ijok MLA, he put up a poster on social media asking for donations in cash and kind for his Ijok MLA service centre. However, he was criticised by netizens who argued that PN had spent abundantly in the past elections and his income as an MLA was paid for by the people who were the taxpayers. Netizens also questioned the account used to ask for donations, which was said to belong to the headmaster of a government school. In response, Jefri took down the poster. Rarely and surprisingly, Johor MLA for Skudai Marina Ibrahim of the opposing PH and Democratic Action Party (DAP) defended Jefri by reminding PH supporters not to forget its struggles and roots when the coalition was in power as a government. Moreover, Speaker of the Johor State Legislative Assembly and Johor MLA for Rengit Mohd Puad Zarkashi of the opposing Barisan Nasional (BN) and United Malays National Organisation (UMNO) expressed his readiness to help Jefri in getting refrigerators for his service centre. He said the refrigerators in his Rengit MLA service centre were bought from the indigenous peoples in Rengit. He also added he could provide free delivery and assured him of the good quality of the refrigerators in case he was personally contacted by Jefri. However, he also highlighted that Jefri should personally ask for donations and electrical appliances instead of requesting from the beneficence of the people. He said it was usually the poor students who would ask for laptops from the elected representatives like Jefri.

== Election results ==
Selangor State Legislative Assembly
Year	Constituency	Candidate	Votes	Pct	Opponent(s)	Votes	Pct	Ballots cast	Majority	Turnout
2018	N11 Ijok	Jefri Mejan (PAS)	3,942	19.98%	Idris Ahmad (PKR)	8,914	45.18%	20,167	2,114	87.40%
2018	N11 Ijok	Jefri Mejan (PAS)	3,942	19.98%	Parthiban Karuppiah (MIC)	6,800	34.46%	20,167	2,114	87.40%
2018	N11 Ijok	Jefri Mejan (PAS)	3,942	19.98%	Kumaran Tamil Dassen (PRM)	76	0.39%	20,167	2,114	87.40%
2023	N11 Ijok	Jefri Mejan (PAS)	12,183	51.52%	Amidi Abdul Manan (PKR)	11,271	47.66%	23,648	912	77.12%
2023	N11 Ijok	Jefri Mejan (PAS)	12,183	51.52%	Tan Cat Keong (IND)	194	0.82%	23,648	912	77.12%
