= Selangor Council of the Royal Court =

Selangor Council of the Royal Court Dewan Diraja Selangor
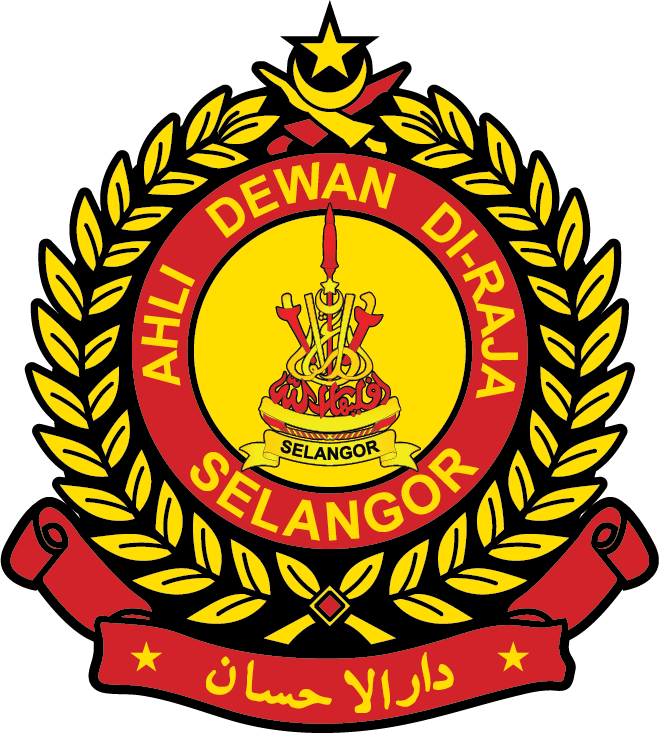
- The Crest of Selangor Council of the Royal Court
- Formation: 1959
- Type: Royal council
- Location: Selangor, Malaysia
- Region served: Selangor
- Fields: Royal affairs
- Members: 22 Selangor royal family members and state officers
- Chairman: Sultan Sharafuddin Idris Shah Al-Haj
- Website: selangorroyaloffice.wordpress.com Selangor Council of the Royal Court on Facebook

Selangor Council of the Royal Court, established in 1959, serves as an advisory council to the head of Selangor state government, Sultan Sharafuddin Idris Shah Al-Haj. There are 22 members of the council, which is made up of royal family members of the House of Opu Daeng Chelak and Selangor state officers.

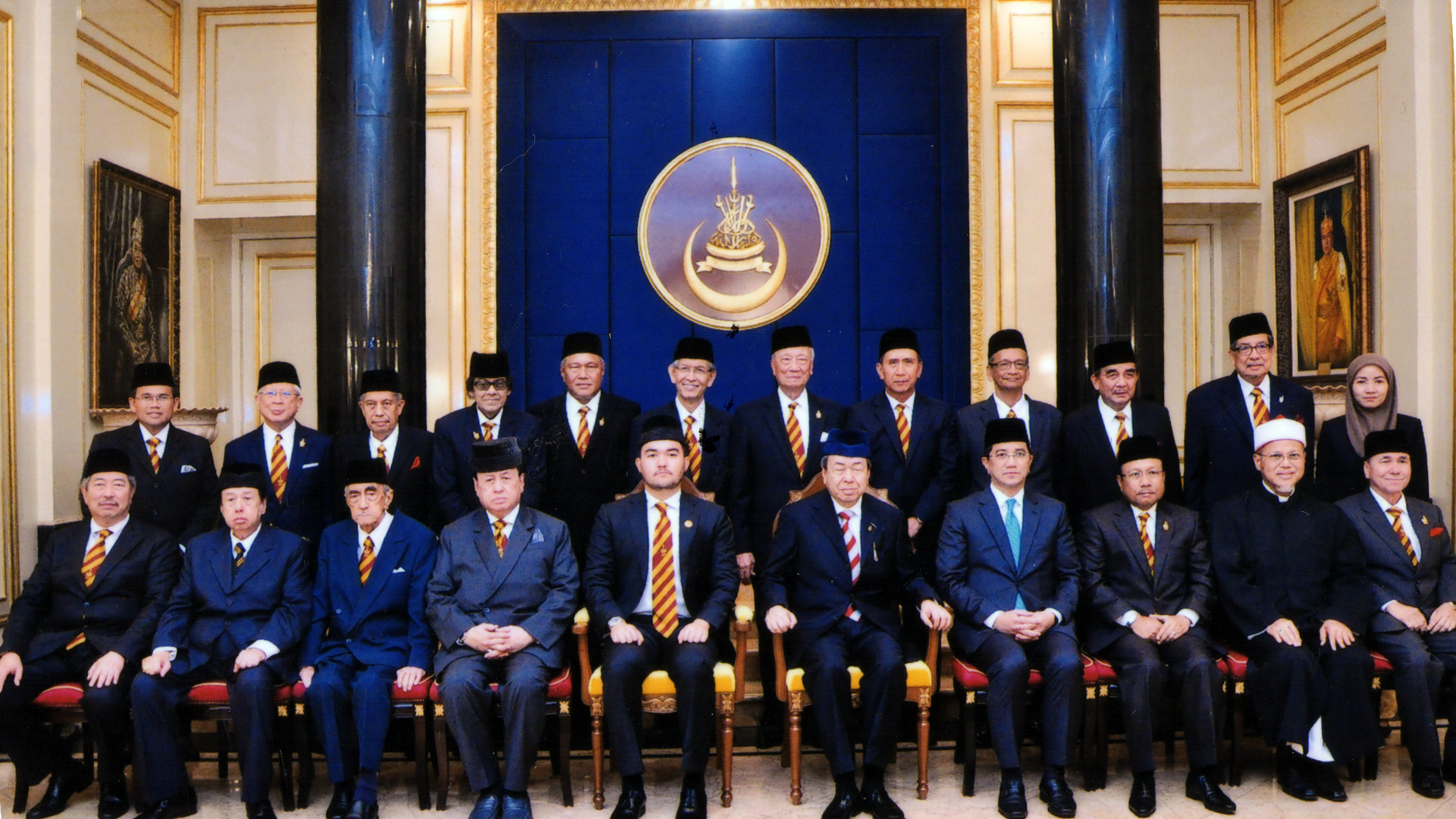
Members of Selangor Council of the Royal Court 2016-2019

== Members ==
Chairman:

1. Sultan of Selangor - Sultan Sharafuddin Idris Shah Al-Haj Ibni Almarhum Sultan Salahuddin Abdul Aziz Shah Al-Haj

Ex-officio:

1. Crown Prince of Selangor - Tengku Amir Shah Ibni Sultan Sharafuddin Idris Shah
2. Prince Bendahara of Selangor - vacant
3. Prince Laksamana of Selangor - Tengku Sulaiman Shah Ibni Almarhum Sultan Salahuddin Abdul Aziz Shah
4. First Minister of Selangor - Datuk Seri Amirudin Shari
5. MAIS Chairman - Datuk Mohamad Adzib Mohd Isa
6. Mufti of Selangor - Datuk Mohd Tamyes Abd Wahid

The Other Heirs：

1. Prince Aris Temenggong of Selangor - vacant
2. Prince Panglima Besar of Selangor - Tengku Abdul Samad Shah Ibni Almarhum Sultan Salahuddin Abdul Aziz Shah Al Haj
3. Prince Panglima King of Selangor - Tengku Ahmad Shah Ibni Almarhum Sultan Salahuddin Abdul Aziz Shah Al Haj
4. Prince Indera Pahlawan Royal of Selangor - Tengku Dato' Setia Putra Alhaj bin Tengku Azman Shah Al Haj

District Chieftains：

1. Prince Seri Wangsa Royal - Tengku Datuk Ramli bin Tengku Sri Andika Diraja Sharuddin Shah
2. Prince Setia Lela Bestari - Raja Tan Sri Arshad bin Raja Sir Tun Uda
3. Datuk Orang Kaya Maha Bijaya Gombak - Dato' Paduka Raja Tan Sri Wan Mahmood bin Pa’wan Teh
4. Datuk Jugra Kurnia Diraja - Tan Sri Syed Mohd Yusof bin Tun Syed Nasir
5. Datuk Salehuddin Saidin

The elders ：

1. Datuk Abdul Halim bin Datuk Abdul Rauf
2. Tan Sri Ambrin Buang
3. General Tan Sri Mohd Hashim bin Mohd Ali
4. Tan Sri Ismail bin Adam
5. Datuk Ramli bin Mahmud
6. Datuk Mohammad Khusrin bin Munawi

== Issues and news ==
On 6 May 2008, DAP chairman, Karpal Singh in the newspaper The Malay Mail was reported to accuse the Sultan of Selangor had interfered with the affairs of Selangor state executives. On 13 Mei 2008, Selangor Council of the Royal Court releases a statement refuting the accusation, saying that the Sultan has the right to give his views, advise and warn the state government on the affairs of the people in accordance to the state constitution.

On 13 March 2018, the council states that they never issued an offer letter for the decoration of Selangor to a person named Goh Boon Leong and a police report has been lodged regarding the forged letter.

On 14 July 2023 The Selangor Council of the Royal Court is demanding Menteri Besar of Kedah Datuk Seri Muhammad Sanusi Md Nor to issue a public apology over his recent remark that was deemed to have insulted the state ruler.

Council member Dato’ Emran Abdul Kadir, representing the group, said the PAS leader ought to apologise immediately considering his statement has been widely shared online.

He said this after lodging a police report against Sanusi here. Also present were other members of the council, namely Tan Sri Ambrin Buang, Dato’ Setia Mohamad Adzib Mohd Isa, Tan Sri Mohd Zawawi Salleh and Dato’ Setia Mohammed Khusrin Munawi.

“We are making this report so that the police can begin investigation and take appropriate action,” Emran told
