= 2007 Ijok by-election =

Election in Malaysia

- 28 April 2007

Ijok seat in the Selangor State Legislative Assembly
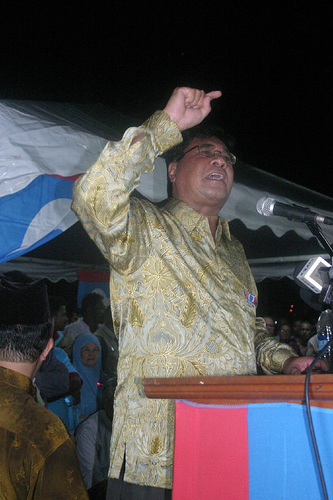
	BN
Candidate	K. Parthiban	Abdul Khalid Ibrahim
Party	BN (MIC)	PKR
Popular vote	5,884	4,034
Percentage	59.33%	40.67%
Ijok assemblyman before election
K. Sivalingam
BN (MIC)
Elected Ijok assemblyman
K. Parthiban
BN (MIC)

The 2007 Ijok by-election was held on 28 April 2007. The seat of Ijok in the State Legislative Assembly of Selangor, Malaysia, fell vacant after the death of the incumbent, K. Sivalingam, on 4 April 2007 from a heart attack. Sivalingam was a member of the state executive council as well as the deputy chairman of the Selangor state Malaysian Indian Congress (MIC), a component party of the ruling Barisan Nasional (BN) coalition. The by-election was won by the BN candidate K. Parthiban, with a 1,850-vote majority over the opposition candidate, Khalid Ibrahim.

== Background ==
State assembly seat N.08 Ijok lies in parliamentary seat P.096 Kuala Selangor. As of the 2004 General Elections, Ijok was a Malay-majority seat (50.6%), followed by Indians (28.3%), Chinese (20.9%) and others (0.2%). In the 2004 election, the late K. Sivalingam of the MIC (a component party of the BN coalition), garnered 5,213 votes, defeating Abdul Rahman Moharam of the People's Justice Party (PKR) (3,564 votes) and independent candidate Mohamed Shariff Nagoorkani (313 votes).

== Pre-nomination speculation ==
=== Barisan Nasional ===
There was no shortage of potential candidates from the BN coalition; the English daily The Star had quoted MIC president S. Samy Vellu that 23 MIC members have expressed interest to contest the by-election. However, the two leading favourites were said to be MIC central working committee members S. Murugesan and T. Mohan. Other names bandied by the media included teacher and MIC Kuala Selangor division chief P. Thirumoorthy, Shah Alam division vice-chairman S. Muruga Vellu and Kota Raja deputy chief R. Subramaniam. However, on 16 April 2007, the BN picked a relative unknown, former teacher K. Parthiban as its by-election candidate. The selection prompted the MIC Kuala Selangor division chief P. Thirumoorthy, a relative party heavyweight on the candidate shortlist to quit the MIC, only to backtrack and declare his support for Parthiban two days later.

=== Opposition ===
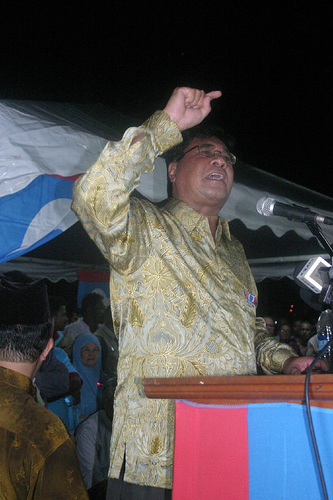
The opposition candidate was Khalid Ibrahim from Parti Keadilan Rakyat (PKR).

Meanwhile, the two major opposition parties, the Pan Malaysian Islamic Party (PAS) and the Democratic Action Party (DAP), in a rare display of opposition solidarity, both threw their support behind the PKR for the by-election. PKR's campaign will be led by party adviser and former Deputy Prime Minister Anwar Ibrahim. The leading potential candidate was current party treasurer and former Kumpulan Guthrie Bhd and Permodalan Nasional Bhd CEO Khalid Ibrahim, although some PKR members lobbied for an Indian candidate.

Eventually, the party announced that it had shortlisted Khalid and Indian bureau head K.S. Nallakarupan for its ticket. Later on 17 April 2007, it was announced that, as expected, Khalid would be the PKR nominee. Nallakarupan said that although PKR President Wan Azizah Wan Ismail had offered him the nomination, he declined in favour of Khalid. Azizah denied allegations of racial bias in the decision, stating: "We picked the candidate not on racial lines but on the basis of the most appropriate choice to be the people's voice in the state assembly".

=== Independent candidates ===
On 15 April 2007, Klang-based businessman K. Loganathan announced he would contest as an independent candidate in the by-election, citing the lack of development and progress under the previous assemblyman and his desire to serve the rural folk of Ijok as reasons.

By 18 April 2007, rumours were rife that a plethora of independent candidates will be contesting the by-election. Independent online news daily Malaysiakini reported as many as four independent candidates, including Loganathan, have expressed interest to contest.

== Nominations ==
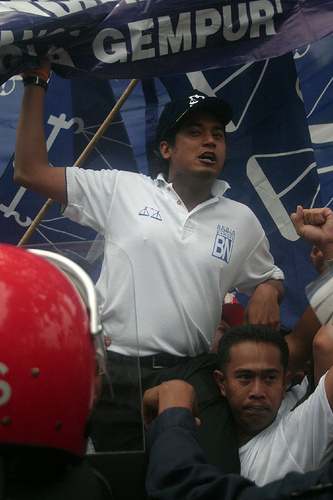
BN Deputy Youth Chief Khairy Jamaluddin was alleged to have been involved in provoking a nomination day scuffle.

On 19 April 2007, the candidates from BN and PKR filed their nominations at the Batang Berjuntai community hall, which was converted into a temporary nomination centre. Neither Loganathan nor any of the purported independent candidates appeared, and thus after the nomination period ended at 11.00 am, returning officer Haris Kasim announced that the by-election would be a straight fight between K. Parthiban of the MIC and Khalid of PKR.

The nomination was marred by a clash between BN and PKR supporters when their processions to the nomination centre inadvertently met. Eventually, the police intervened and separated the two groups. PKR later accused that Khairy Jamaluddin, Deputy BN Youth Chief, had been involved in provoking the fight, and also that BN Youth Chief and Education Minister Hishamuddin Hussein had thrown bottles at PKR supporters. However, no valid reports was actually made.

The Prime Minister had later warned both PKR and BN supporters of their behaviour during the by-election of Ijok.

== By-election results ==
The BN candidate, K. Parthiban, won with a majority of 1,850 votes. Parthiban secured 5,884 votes while Keadilan's Abdul Khalid Ibrahim got 4,034 votes. A total of 10,052 voters, or 81.9%, of the 12,272 eligible voters had cast their ballots, a record turnout for the constituency. In the 2004 General Elections, BN defeated PKR by 1,649 votes in the constituency.

Selangor state by-election, 28 April 2007: Ijok Upon the death of incumbent, Sivalingam Arumugam Karuppiah
Party	Candidate	Votes	%	∆%
BN	K. Parthiban	5,884	59.33	+ 1.98
PKR	Abdul Khalid Ibrahim	4,034	40.67	+ 1.46
Total valid votes		9,918	100.00	
Total rejected ballots		134		
Unreturned ballots				
Turnout		10,052	81.90	
Registered electors		12,272		
Majority		1,850		
BN hold		Swing		
