= Pelabuhan Klang (state constituency) =

Government organization in Malaysia

Pelabuhan Klang (N46)
Selangor constituency

State constituency
- Legislature: Selangor State Legislative Assembly
MLA
Azmizam Zaman Huri
PH
- Constituency created: 1994
- First contested: 1995
- Last contested: 2023

Demographics
- Population (2020): 100,544
- Electors (2023): 51,907

Pelabuhan Klang is a state constituency in Selangor, Malaysia, that has been represented in the Selangor State Legislative Assembly since 1995.

The state constituency was created in the 1994 redistribution and is mandated to return a single member to the Selangor State Legislative Assembly under the first past the post voting system.

== Demographics ==
Ethnic breakdown of Pelabuhan Klang's electorate as of 2023
1. Malay (61.9%)
2. Chinese (18.1%)
3. Indian (17.4%)
4. Other ethnicities (2.60%)

== History ==
According to the federal gazette issued on 30 March 2018, the Pelabuhan Klang constituency is divided into 14 polling districts.

State constituency	Polling district	Code	Location
Pelabuhan Klang（N46）	Kampung Pendamar	110/46/01	SK Kampung Pendamar
Pelabuhan Klang（N46）	Kampung Idaman	110/46/02	SK Kampung Idaman
Pelabuhan Klang（N46）	Jalan Padang	110/46/03	Dewan Serbaguna Pelabuhan Klang
Pelabuhan Klang（N46）	Kawasan Pelabuhan	110/46/04	SRA Taman Kem
Pelabuhan Klang（N46）	Jalan Kem	110/46/05	SK Pelabuhan Klang
Pelabuhan Klang（N46）	Teluk Gong Utara	110/46/06	SK Telok Gong Kampung Nelayan
Pelabuhan Klang（N46）	Pulau Indah Utara	110/46/07	SK Pulau Indah
Pelabuhan Klang（N46）	Pulau Indah Selatan	110/46/08	SRA Kampung Perigi Nenas
Pelabuhan Klang（N46）	Pandamaran Jaya Jalan 1-12	110/46/09	SK Pandamaran Jaya
Pelabuhan Klang（N46）	Teluk Gong Selatan	110/46/10	Sekolah Agama Rakyat Al-Mumtaz Masjid
Pelabuhan Klang（N46）	Pandamaran Jaya Jalan 13-100	110/46/11	SRA Pandamaran Jaya
Pelabuhan Klang（N46）	Seri Pendamar	110/46/12	SA Rakyat KAFA Integrasi Kampung Pendamar
Pelabuhan Klang（N46）	Pandamaran Jaya Apartment	110/46/13	SK Pandamaran Jaya
Pelabuhan Klang（N46）	Selat Selatan	110/46/14	Dewan Serbaguna Kampung Idaman

=== Representation history ===
Members of the Legislative Assembly for Pelabuhan Klang
Assembly	No	Years	Member	Party
Constituency created from Shahbandar Raya and Pandamaran
9th	N42	1995–1999	Tai Chang Eng @ Teh Chang Ying	BN (MCA)
10th	N42	1999–2004	Tai Chang Eng @ Teh Chang Ying	BN (MCA)
11th	N46	2004–2008	Zakaria Deros	BN (UMNO)
12th	N46	2008–2010	Badrul Hisham Abdullah	PR (PKR)
12th	N46	2010	Badrul Hisham Abdullah	IND
12th	N46	2010–2013	Badrul Hisham Abdullah	BN (UMNO)
13th	N46	2013–2014	Abdul Khalid Ibrahim	PR (PKR)
13th	N46	2014–2018	Abdul Khalid Ibrahim	IND
14th	N46	2018–2023	Azmizam Zaman Huri	PH (PKR)
15th	N46	2023–present	Azmizam Zaman Huri	PH (PKR)

== Election results ==
Selangor state election, 2023
Party	Candidate	Votes	%	∆%
PH	Azmizam Zaman Huri	21,889	56.39	▲0.44
PN	Wan Hasrina Wan Hassan	16,658	42.92	▲42.92
Parti Rakyat Malaysia	Syed Ahmad Putra Syed Isa	269	0.69	▲0.69
Total valid votes		38,816	100.00	
Total rejected ballots		249		
Unreturned ballots		26		
Turnout		39,091	75.31	▼9.73
Registered electors		51,907		
Majority		5,231	13.47	▼9.22
PH hold		Swing		

Selangor state election, 2018
Party	Candidate	Votes	%	∆%
PKR	Azmizam Zaman Huri	15,837	55.95	▲55.95
BN	Seikh Rajesh Seikh Ahmad	9,415	33.26	▼12.36
PAS	Khalid Nayan	2,925	10.33	▲10.33
Parti Sosialis Malaysia	Shanmugasundram Veerappan	128	0.45	▲0.45
Total valid votes		28,305	100.00	
Total rejected ballots		393		
Unreturned ballots		54		
Turnout		28,752	85.04	▼2.11
Registered electors		33,809		
Majority		6,422	22.69	▲13.93
PKR hold		Swing		

Selangor state election, 2013
Party	Candidate	Votes	%	∆%
PKR	Abdul Khalid Ibrahim	18,591	54.38	▼4.75
BN	Nasarruddin M Zin	15,597	45.62	▲7.51
Total valid votes		34,188	100.00	
Total rejected ballots		596		
Unreturned ballots		51		
Turnout		34,835	87.15	▲11.68
Registered electors		39,972		
Majority		2,994	8.76	▼12.26
PKR hold		Swing		
Source(s) "Federal Government Gazette - Notice of Contested Election, State Legislative Assembly for the State of Selangor [P.U. (B) 192/2013]" (PDF). Attorney General's Chambers of Malaysia. 26 April 2013. Archived from the original (PDF) on 29 December 2019. "Federal Government Gazette - Results of Contested Election and Statements of the Poll after the Official Addition of Votes, State Constituencies for the State of Selangor [P.U. (B) 233/2013]" (PDF). Attorney General's Chambers of Malaysia. 22 May 2013. Archived from the original (PDF) on 2 October 2018.

Selangor state election, 2008
Party	Candidate	Votes	%	∆%
PKR	Badrul Hisham Abdullah	12,397	59.13	▲29.94
BN	Roselinda Abd Jamil	7,990	38.11	▼32.70
Independent	Nazir Mansor	580	2.77	▲2.77
Total valid votes		20,967	100.00	
Total rejected ballots		485		
Unreturned ballots		23		
Turnout		21,475	75.47	▲6.07
Registered electors		28,456		
Majority		4,407	21.02	▼21.60
PKR gain from BN		Swing		?

Selangor state election, 2004
Party	Candidate	Votes	%	∆%
BN	Zakaria @ Zainal Md. Deros	12,312	70.81	▲14.07
PKR	Krishnasamy Punusamy	5,075	29.19	▲29.19
Total valid votes		17,387	100.00	
Total rejected ballots		564		
Unreturned ballots		4		
Turnout		17,955	69.40	▲1.67
Registered electors		25,871		
Majority		7,237	41.62	▲28.14
BN hold		Swing		

Selangor state election, 1999
Party	Candidate	Votes	%	∆%
BN	Tai Chang Eng @ Teh Chang Ying	15,488	56.74	▼12.64
DAP	Tee Boon Hock	11,808	43.26	▲12.64
Total valid votes		27,296	100.00	
Total rejected ballots		451		
Unreturned ballots		16		
Turnout		27,763	67.73	▼2.55
Registered electors		40,988		
Majority		3,680	13.48	▼25.28
BN hold		Swing		

Selangor state election, 1995
Party	Candidate	Votes	%
BN	Tai Chang Eng @ Teh Chang Ying	17,308	69.38
DAP	Madhavan Nair Narayanan Nair	7,637	30.62
Total valid votes		24,945	100.00
Total rejected ballots		412	
Unreturned ballots		1,605	
Turnout		26,962	70.28
Registered electors		38,364	
Majority		9,671	38.76
This was a new constituency created.
