= Seri Cahaya (state constituency) =

Selangor constituency

Defunct state constituency
- Legislature: Selangor State Legislative Assembly
- Constituency created: 1984
- Constituency abolished: 1995
- First contested: 1986
- Last contested: 1990

Seri Cahaya was a state constituency in Selangor, Malaysia, that was represented in the Selangor State Legislative Assembly from 1986 to 1995.

The state constituency was created in the 1984 redistribution and was mandated to return a single member to the Selangor State Legislative Assembly under the first past the post voting system.

== History ==
It was abolished in 1995 when it was redistributed.

=== Representation history ===
Members of the Legislative Assembly for Seri Cahaya
Assembly	No	Years	Member	Party
Constituency created from Asam Jawa
7th	N12	1986-1990	M. Mahalingam	BN (MIC)
8th	N12	1990-1995	Sivalingam Arumugam Karuppiah	BN (MIC)
Constituency abolished, renamed to Ijuk

== Election results ==
Selangor state election, 1990
Party	Candidate	Votes	%	∆%
BN	Sivalingam Arumugam Karuppiah	5,405	55.75	▼7.29
S46	Mohd Shahir	4,088	42.17	▲42.17
Independent	Suhaimi Amnan	202	2.08	▲2.08
Total valid votes		9,695	100.00	
Total rejected ballots		443		
Unreturned ballots		0		
Turnout		10,138	74.70	▲1.30
Registered electors		13,572		
Majority		1,317	13.58	▼25.43
BN hold		Swing		

Selangor state election, 1986
Party	Candidate	Votes	%
BN	M. Mahalingam	5,210	63.04
NASMA	Raja Nasron Raja Ishak	1,986	24.03
DAP	P Sinniah	1,069	12.93
Total valid votes		8,265	100.00
Total rejected ballots		370	
Unreturned ballots		0	
Turnout		8,635	73.10
Registered electors		11,812	
Majority		3,224	39.01
This was a new constituency created.
