= Zakaria Deros =

Malaysian politician

Yang Berbahagia Dato' Zakaria Md Deros DSSA PJK

Member of the Selangor State Legislative Assembly for Pelabuhan Klang
- In office 21 March 2004 – 8 March 2008
- Preceded by: Tai Chang Eng (BN–MCA)
- Succeeded by: Badrul Hisham Abdullah (PR–PKR)
- Majority: 7,237 (2004)

Member of the Selangor State Legislative Assembly for Selat Klang
- In office 29 November 1999 – 21 March 2004
- Preceded by: Onn Ismail (BN–UMNO)
- Succeeded by: Norliza Ahmad (BN–UMNO)
- Majority: 2,698 (1999)

Personal details
- Born: Zakaria @ Zainal bin Haji Md. Deros; 28 September 1946 Kuala Sungai Baru, Malacca, Federation of Malaya
- Died: 11 March 2008 (aged 61)
- Party: United Malays National Organisation (UMNO)
- Other political affiliations: Barisan Nasional (BN)

Zakaria bin Md. Deros (28 September 1946 – 11 March 2008) was a Malaysian politician. He was the former Pelabuhan Klang state assemblyman and Klang municipal councillor from year 2004 to year 2006.

== Early life ==
Zakaria born on 28 September 1946 in Kuala Sungai Baru, Malacca.

== Political career ==
Zakaria, who was the candidate for BN-UMNO, was elected state assemblyman for Pelabuhan Klang (N46) in the 2004 election. He took over from Dato' Teh Chang Ying (BN - MCA) who won the seat in the 1999 election. However, in the 2008 election, he was not selected as a candidate and was replaced by his daughter-in-law Roselinda Abdul Jamil, which she did not win.

== Controversies ==
Zakaria gained infamy in 2006 when he had a run-in with the law for not submitting building plans for his mansion, dubbed as an istana (palace) by his detractors. He was also found not to have paid the assessment for a property for 12 years, while his family was caught operating an illegal satay restaurant on government reserve land. His mansion has 21 bathrooms and 16 bedrooms, including 11 that are occupied by each of his children, as well as a VIP room, three living rooms, a dining hall and a prayer room.

The house also has a swimming pool, a bowling room, several gazebos, an orchard, a two-hole golf lawn, an office, a storeroom, two rooms for maids as well as a wet kitchen and a dry kitchen.

== Death ==
On 11 March 2008, Zakaria died at the age of 62 after suffering a heart attack. He had been discussing over dinner the dismal results of the just-concluded 2008 election (in which his party fared poorly, losing Selangor state to the opposition) when he collapsed. He is buried in Malacca.

== Election results ==
Selangor State Legislative Assembly
Year	Constituency	Candidate	Votes	Pct	Opponent(s)	Votes	Pct	Ballots cast	Majority	Turnout
1999	N40 Selat Klang	Zakaria Md Deros (UMNO)	9,970	57.82%	Ahmad Supian (PAS)	7,272	42.18%	17,561	2,698	70.95%
2004	N46 Pelabuhan Klang	Zakaria Md Deros (UMNO)	12,312	70.81%	Krishnasamy Punusamy (PKR)	5,075	29.19%	17,955	7,237	69.40%

== Honours ==
- Selangor
  - Knight Companion of the Order of Sultan Salahuddin Abdul Aziz Shah (DSSA) – Dato' (1996)
  - Meritorious Service Medal (PJK) (1981)
