= 2008 Selangor state election =

Malaysian state legislative election

- 8 March 2008

56 seats to the Selangor State Legislative Assembly 29 seats needed for a majority
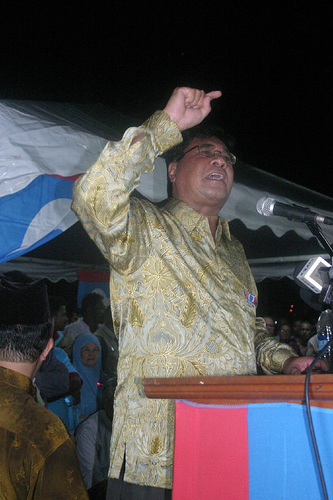

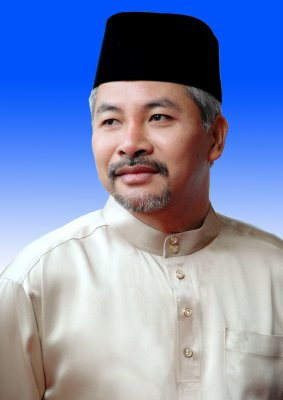
	Majority party	Minority party
Leader	Khalid Ibrahim	Khir Toyo
Party	PKR	UMNO
Alliance	Pakatan Rakyat	Barisan Nasional
Leader since	2007	2000
Leader's seat	Ijok	Sungai Panjang
Last election	2	54 seats, 65.1%
Seats won	36	20
Seat change	▲34	▼34
Popular vote	649,945 (Note: All the figures of votes and seats are a combined result of all the component parties in PR.)	507,851 (Note: All the figures of votes and seats are a combined result of all the component parties in BN.)
Percentage	56.0%	43.8%
Swing	▲21.8	▼21.3
Menteri Besar before election
Khir Toyo
BN (UMNO)
Elected Menteri Besar
Khalid Ibrahim
PR (PKR)

The 12th Selangor state election was held on 8 March 2008. Polling took place in 56 constituencies throughout the State of Selangor, with each electing a state assemblyman to the Selangor State Legislative Assembly. The election was conducted by the Malaysian Election Commission. The state election was held concurrently with the 2008 Malaysian general election.

The election proved to be a watershed in Selangor's history, as the incumbent government from Barisan Nasional (BN) was handed an unprecedented and shocking defeat by the opposition, making the election the first time Selangor's ruling party was voted out of power. The informal coalition of Democratic Action Party (DAP), Parti Islam Se-Malaysia (PAS) and Parti Keadilan Rakyat (PKR) won 38 seats out of the 56 seats, gaining a two-thirds majority in the Selangor State Legislative Assembly.

== Background ==
The Selangor State Legislative Assembly will be automatically dissolved on 13 February 2008, the fifth anniversary of the first session and the election shall be held within sixty days (two months) of the dissolution (on or before 13 February 2008, a date to be announced by the Election Commission of Malaysia), unless dissolved before that date by the Head of State, Sultan of Selangor on the advice of the Menteri Besar of Selangor.

== Results ==
Party or alliance		Votes	%	Seats	+/–
DAP-PAS-PKR coalition	People's Justice Party	234,552	20.21	15	+15
DAP-PAS-PKR coalition	Democratic Action Party	199,054	17.15	13	+11
DAP-PAS-PKR coalition	Malaysian Islamic Party	216,339	18.64	8	+8
DAP-PAS-PKR coalition	Total	649,945	56.00	36	+34
Barisan Nasional	United Malays National Organisation	355,334	30.62	18	–17
Barisan Nasional	Malaysian Chinese Association	103,756	8.94	2	–10
Barisan Nasional	Parti Gerakan Rakyat Malaysia	21,875	1.88	0	–3
Barisan Nasional	Malaysian Indian Congress	26,886	2.32	0	–4
Barisan Nasional	Total	508,851	43.84	20	–34
Independents		2,773	0.24	0	–
Total		1,160,569	100.00	56	0
Valid votes		1,160,569	98.21		
Invalid/blank votes		21,206	1.79		
Total votes		1,181,775	100.00		
Registered voters/turnout		1,187,280	99.54		
Source: The Star
