= Ijok (state constituency) =

State constituency in Selangor, Malaysia

Ijok (N11)
Selangor constituency

State constituency
- Legislature: Selangor State Legislative Assembly
MLA
Jefri Mejan
PN
- Constituency created: 1994 (as Ijuk)
- First contested: 1995
- Last contested: 2023

Demographics
- Population (2020): 38,457
- Electors (2023): 30,662

Ijok is a state constituency in Selangor, Malaysia, that has been represented in the Selangor State Legislative Assembly since 1995. It has been represented by Jefri Mejan of Perikatan Nasional (PN) since 2023.

The state constituency was created in the 1994 redistribution and is mandated to return a single member to the Selangor State Legislative Assembly under the first past the post voting system.

== Demographics ==
Ethnic breakdown of Ijok's electorate as of 2023
1. Malay (61.6%)
2. Indian (24.2%)
3. Chinese (13.2%)
4. Other ethnicities (1.01%)

== History ==
=== Polling districts ===
According to the federal gazette issued on 30 March 2018, the Ijok constituency is divided into 11 polling districts.

State constituency	Polling Districts	Code	Location
Ijok (N11）	Sungai Darah	096/11/01	SK Rantau Panjang Bestari Jaya
Ijok (N11）	Bestari Jaya Selatan	096/11/02	SMK Raja Muda Musa Batang Berjuntai
Ijok (N11）	Jaya Setia	096/11/03	SK Jaya Setia
Ijok (N11）	Bukit Badong	096/11/04	SK Bukit Badong
Ijok (N11）	Kampung Ijok	096/11/05	SK Ijok
Ijok (N11）	Pekan Ijok	096/11/06	SJK (C) Ijok
Ijok (N11）	Simpang Ijok	096/11/07	SA Rakyat Al-Hilal Spg. Tiga Ijok
Ijok (N11）	Bestari Jaya Utara	096/11/08	SK Bestari Jaya
Ijok (N11）	Ladang Bukit Ijok	096/11/09	SJK (T) Ladang Bukit Ijok
Ijok (N11）	Parit Mahang	096/11/10	SK Parit Mahang
Ijok (N11）	Bukit Cherakah	096/11/11	SK Dato' Maharaja Lela

=== Representation history ===
Members of the Legislative Assembly for Ijok
Assembly	No	Years	Member	Party
Constituency renamed from Seri Cahaya, Sungai Tinggi and Jeram
Ijuk
9th	N11	1995-1999	Sivalingam Arumugam Karuppiah	BN (MIC)
10th	N11	1999-2004	Sivalingam Arumugam Karuppiah	BN (MIC)
Ijok
11th	N11	2004-2007	Sivalingam Arumugam Karuppiah	BN (MIC)
11th	N11	2007-2008	Parthiban Karuppiah	BN (MIC)
12th	N11	2008-2013	Abdul Khalid Ibrahim	PR (PKR)
13th	N11	2013-2018	Idris Ahmad	PR (PKR)
14th	N11	2018–2023	Idris Ahmad	PH (PKR)
15th	N11	2023–present	Jefri Mejan	PN (PAS)

== Election results ==
Selangor state election, 2023
Party	Candidate	Votes	%	∆%
PN	Jefri Mejan	12,183	51.52	▲51.52
PH	Amidi Abdul Manan	11,271	47.66	▲1.48
Independent	Tan Cat Keong	194	0.08	▲0.08
Total valid votes		23,648	100.00	
Total rejected ballots		156		
Unreturned ballots		19		
Turnout		23,823	77.70	▼9.70
Registered electors		30,662		
Majority		912	3.86	▼6.86
PN gain from PKR		Swing		?

Selangor state election, 2018
Party	Candidate	Votes	%	∆%
PKR	Idris Ahmad	8,914	45.18	▼7.09
BN	Parthiban Karuppiah	6,800	34.46	▼13.27
PAS	Jefri Mejan	3,942	19.98	▲19.98
Parti Rakyat Malaysia	Kumaran Tamil Dassen	76	0.39	▲0.39
Total valid votes		19,732	100.00	
Total rejected ballots		396		
Unreturned ballots		0		
Turnout		20,167	87.40	▼1.86
Registered electors		23,073		
Majority		2,114	10.72	▲6.14
PKR hold		Swing		
Source(s) "Keputusan Undi Dewan Undangan Negeri (DUN)". www.myundi.com.my. "14th General Election Malaysia (GE14 / PRU14) - Selangor". election.thestar.com.my.

Selangor state election, 2013
Party	Candidate	Votes	%	∆%
PKR	Idris Ahmad	8,522	52.27	▼5.43
BN	Parthiban Karuppiah	7,783	47.73	▲5.43
Total valid votes		16,305	100.00	
Total rejected ballots		297		
Unreturned ballots		36		
Turnout		16,638	89.26	▲7.25
Registered electors		18,639		
Majority		739	4.54	▼10.86
PKR hold		Swing		
Source(s) "Federal Government Gazette - Notice of Contested Election, State Legislative Assembly for the State of Selangor [P.U. (B) 192/2013]" (PDF). Attorney General's Chambers of Malaysia. 26 April 2013. Archived from the original (PDF) on 2019-12-29. "Federal Government Gazette - Results of Contested Election and Statements of the Poll after the Official Addition of Votes, State Constituencies for the State of Selangor [P.U. (B) 233/2013]" (PDF). Attorney General's Chambers of Malaysia. 22 May 2013. Archived from the original (PDF) on 2018-10-02.

Selangor state election, 2008
Party	Candidate	Votes	%	∆%
PKR	Abdul Khalid Ibrahim	7,196	57.70	▲17.03
BN	Mohamed Sayuti Said	5,276	42.30	▼17.03
Total valid votes		12,472	100.00	
Total rejected ballots		204		
Unreturned ballots		8		
Turnout		12,684	82.01	▲0.11
Registered electors		15,467		
Majority		1,920	15.40	▼3.26
PKR gain from BN		Swing		?

Selangor state by-election, 28 April 2007 Upon the death of incumbent, Sivalingam Arumugam Karuppiah
Party	Candidate	Votes	%	∆%
BN	Parthiban Karuppiah	5,884	59.33	▲1.98
PKR	Abdul Khalid Ibrahim	4,034	40.67	▲1.46
Total valid votes		9,918	100.00	
Total rejected ballots		134		
Unreturned ballots				
Turnout		10,052	81.90	▲6.31
Registered electors		12,272		
Majority		1,850	18.66	▲0.52
BN hold		Swing		

Selangor state election, 2004
Party	Candidate	Votes	%	∆%
BN	Sivalingam Arumugam Karuppiah	5,213	57.35	▼1.22
PKR	Abdol Raman Moharam	3,564	39.21	▲39.21
Independent	Mohamed Shariff Nagoorkani	313	3.44	▲3.44
Total valid votes		9,090	100.00	
Total rejected ballots		254		
Unreturned ballots		32		
Turnout		9,376	75.59	▲5.86
Registered electors		12,404		
Majority		1,649	18.14	▼10.10
BN hold		Swing		

Selangor state election, 1999
Party	Candidate	Votes	%	∆%
BN	Sivalingam Arumugam Karuppiah	6,567	58.57	▼24.83
DAP	Krishnan Veeriah	3,401	30.33	▲13.73
Independent	Mohd Yusof Ab. Rahim	1,245	11.10	▲11.10
Total valid votes		11,213	100.00	
Total rejected ballots		531		
Unreturned ballots		3		
Turnout		11,747	69.73	▲1.17
Registered electors		16,847		
Majority		3,166	28.24	▼38.56
BN hold		Swing		

Selangor state election, 1995
Party	Candidate	Votes	%	∆%
BN	Sivalingam Arumugam Karuppiah	8,486	83.40	
DAP	Sinniah Periannan	1,689	16.60	
Total valid votes		10,175	100.00	
Total rejected ballots		951		
Unreturned ballots		37		
Turnout		11,163	68.56	
Registered electors		16,282		
Majority		6,797	66.80	
This was a new constituency created.
