= Saidina Umar Al Khattab Mosque =

Mosque in Kuala Lumpur, Malaysia

Coordinates: 3°09′00.0″N 101°39′18.4″E

- Masjid Saidina Umar Al Khattab

Religion
- Affiliation: Islam
- Branch/tradition: Sunni (Shafi'i)

Location
- Location: Bukit Damansara, Kuala Lumpur, Malaysia
- Interactive map of Saidina Umar Al Khattab Mosque

Architecture
- Type: Mosque
- Style: Ottoman, Modernist
- Completed: 1984
- Minaret: 1

The Saidina Umar Al Khattab Mosque (Malay: Masjid Saidina Umar Al Khattab, (MSUAK)) is a prominent mosque in Bukit Damansara (Damansara Heights), Kuala Lumpur, Malaysia.

The mosque was officially opened on 22 March 1984 by the seventh Yang di-Pertuan Agong, Sultan Ahmad Shah of Pahang and was named after Muhammad's successor (Caliph) Umar Al Khattab.

== See also ==
- Islam in Malaysia
