= Laws of the Constitution of Selangor 1959 =

Constitution of the state of Selangor, Malaysia

Overview
- Original title: Undang-Undang Tubuh Kerajaan Selangor 1959
- Jurisdiction: Selangor, Malaysia
- Subordinate to: Federal Constitution of Malaysia
- Ratified: 26 February 1959
- Date effective: 1 April 1959
- System: Parliamentary democracy Constitutional monarchy

Government structure
- Branches: Two (Legislative and Executive)
- Head of state: Sultan of Selangor
- Chambers: Unicameral
- Executive: State Executive Council
- Signatories: Sultan Hisamuddin Alam Shah; Abdul Jamil bin Abdul Rais, Menteri Besar of Selangor; Hashim bin Mat Idris, State Secretary; Bahaudin bin Mohd. Yacob, Legal advisor; Tengku Laksamana Badli Shah; Tengku Panglima Besar Ismail Shah; Tengku Abdul Aziz Shah al-Haj, the Crown Prince; Abdullah bin Haji Mohd Yasin; V. Manickavasagam; Lee Yoon Thim; Mahmood bin Haji Abdul Rahman; Haji Kamaruddin bin Haji Ibrahim, Orang Kaya Maha Bijaya, Ulu Selangor; Haji Ibrahim bin Dato' Ismail, Dato' Penggawa Permatang Paduka Maha Bijaya, Kuala Selangor; Abdul Ghani bin Shamsuddin, Orang Kaya To' Engku Maha Bijaya, Ulu Langat
- Supersedes: First Part of the Laws of the Constitution of Selangor 1948; Second Part of the Laws of the Constitution of Selangor 1950

Footnote
- Laws of the Constitution of Selangor 1959 (in English and Malay)

The Laws of the Constitution of Selangor 1959 is the constitution of the state of Selangor in Malaysia and establishes the state as a constitutional monarchy with the Sultan of Selangor as its head of state. It also laid down the fundamental structure and machinery of government in Selangor, such as the state executive council and the state legislative assembly. It came into force in April 1959 following the independence of Federation of Malaya in 1957.

== History ==
The Laws of the Constitution of Selangor Part I was firstly introduced on 1 February 1948, following the formation of Federation of Malaya. Under the State Agreement, the Malay Rulers are required to promulgated their State Constitution of which are used to distinguish the legislative power from the executive power by constituting a legislative body. Part II was introduced on 2 May 1950.

After Malaya gained independence, the Selangor State Council unanimously approved a new state constitution on 26 March 1959. The new constitution was then signed by the Sultan of Selangor and other dignitaries on 30 April the same year. (Note: However in the text of the Constitution, it stated that the date of signing was on 22 April 1959, contradicting with contemporary news reports.) It retrospectively took effect on 1 April 1959 as the Laws of the Constitution of Selangor 1959, and revoked and replaced the two previous Laws of the Constitution of Selangor of 1948 and 1950.

== Composition ==
The Constitution, in its current form (1 January 2008), consists of 2 Parts, 19 chapters containing 103 articles and 1 schedule (including 34 amendments).

=== Part 1 ===
- Preliminary

Preliminary contains four articles; article 1 for short title and date of commencement, article 2 for constitutional amendments, article 3 for First Part of the Laws of the Constitution and article 4 for interpretation of the terminologies used by the royal family members, heirs, elders, territorial chiefs, council of the Royal Court and Islamic Law.

- Chapter 1 - The Sultan

Chapter 1 contains ten articles; article 5 to 13. This chapter pertains to the Sultan of Selangor, including the qualifications of becoming the Sultan, order of successions and rules regarding the abdication of Sultan.

- Chapter 2 - The Heir

Chapter 2 contains seven articles; article 14 to 20. This chapter pertains to the Heir Apparent of Selangor, including the styles and titles may be used by the Heir (Raja Muda Selangor), his role in state affairs, the qualification of becoming one and rules regarding the abdication of Heir.

- Chapter 3 - Regency

Chapter 3 contains two articles; article 21 and 22. It addresses the conditions that requires a regency, the process of appointing a regent and the regents role in Conference of Rulers.

- Chapter 4 - Dewan Di-Raja

Chapter 4 contains sixteen articles; article 23 to 37. It addresses the functions of Dewan Di-Raja (Selangor Council of the Royal Court), the appointment of its members, and rules regarding the council's proceedings.

- Chapter 5 - Titles and Honours

Chapter 5 contains three articles; article 38 to 40. This chapter pertains to the Sultan's role as the fountain of honours and dignity. It addresses the Sultan's powers in giving honours, and the power to degrade any rank or title he had conferred.

- Chapter 6 - Consorts of The Sultan and Raja Muda

Chapter 6 contains five articles; article 41 to 44. It addresses rules regarding the appointment of consorts of the Sultan and Raja Muda, their styles and titles, and their entitlements.

=== Part 2 - The Machinery of Government ===
- Part 2 Preliminary

Part 2 Preliminary consists of two articles; article 45 for second part of the Laws and article 46 for interpretation of the terminologies used by the State Government and its organs and servants.

- Chapter 1 - Religion of the state

This chapter contains two articles; article 47 and 48. It pertains to the religion of the state and Sultan's role as the Head of Religion. It also provides that everyone has the freedom to practice his own religion.

- Chapter 2 - The state seal

This chapter contains only one article; article 49. It describes the appearance of the Public Seal of the State of Selangor and its functions.

- Chapter 3 - Executive

This chapter contains eleven articles; article 50 to 59. It pertains to executive authority power of the Sultan, the process of appointment of Mentri Besar of Selangor, State Secretary, Legal Advisor, Financial Officer, and the members of Selangor State Executive Council and rules regarding the proceedings of the council.

- Chapter 4 - The Power of Pardon

This chapter contains one article; article 60. It addresses the power of Sultan to give pardon, reprieve or respite to convicted criminals that carries out crime in the state. It also pertains to the Pardon Board, its membership and its role.

- Chapter 5 - The Legislature

This chapter contains twenty three articles; article 61 to 83. It pertains to the Selangor State Legislative Assembly, its memberships, summoning, prorogation and dissolution, Speaker election, roles, and proceedings.

- Chapter 6 - Finance

This chapter contains six articles; article 84 to 89. It addresses financial issues and the budget.

- Chapter 7 - Capacity of the State

This chapter contains one article; article 90. It addresses the capacity of the state to acquire, hold or dispose of property of any kind, and to sue or be sued.

- Chapter 8 - Special Position Relating to the Malays

This chapter contains one article; article 91. It pertains to the special position of the Malays and the Sultan role of safeguarding it.

- Chapter 9 - General Provisions

This chapter contains five articles; article 92 to 96. Article 92 provides that there shall be impartial treatment towards any state employees regardless of their races. Article 93 describes the state mottos, emblems and flags. Article 94 and 95 pertains to the interpretation of the constitution. Article 96 - The Royal Prerogatives, provides that the Constitution shall not affect the prerogatives, powers and jurisdiction of the Sultan.

- Chapter 10 - State Service Commission

This chapter contains one article; article 97. It pertains to the State Service Commission, its membership, roles and responsibility.

- Chapter 11 - Amendments of the Constitution

This chapter contains one article; article 98. It pertains to mechanisms and procedures related to amending the Constitution.

- Chapter 12 - Transitional Provisions

This chapter contains one article; article 99. It addresses the membership of the temporary State Executive Council after the dissolution of Legislative Assembly.

- Chapter 13 - Reprint and the Authoritative Text of The Constitution

This chapter contains one article; article 100. It pertains to the reprinting procedure of the Constitution and its authoritative text.

=== The Schedule ===
Article 77 - Powers and privileges of the Legislative Assembly

== The Monarch ==
=== Chapter 1 - The Sultan ===
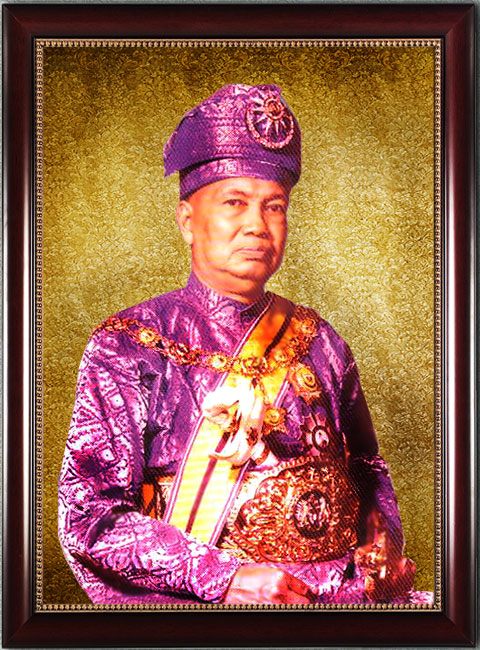
Sultan Hisamuddin Alam Shah was the reigning Sultan when the Laws of Constitution of Selangor 1959 was created.

Article 5 provides that the Sultan and his Heir(s) shall be a person who is:

- a Malay
- of Royal Blood
- a descendant of Selangor Sultan
- a male
- professes the Muslim religion

Article 6 provides that the Sultan must be of lawfully begotten and acknowledged descendant of Sultan Hisamuddin Alam Shah. The succession order is determined by agnatic primogeniture, that is according to seniority of lineage, firstly among the sons of the previous Sultan, with sons and their male-line issue inheriting before brothers and their issue. It is unlawful to choose or appoint any other person as Sultan as long as the descendant of Sultan Hisamuddin exists.

A descendant is disqualified to be a Sultan if after full and complete enquiry by Dewan Di-Raja (Selangor Council of the Royal Court), he is founded to have some great and serious defect, derogatory to the quality of a Sultan, such as insanity, blindness, dumbness or possessing some qualities that makes him unsuitable to be a Sultan according to Hukum Shara'. Hukum Shara' is defined as Islamic Law in any legal schools.

Article 7 provides that if male lineal descendant of Sultan Hisamuddin Alam Shah is to extinct, or if the descendants are unworthy of becoming Sultan, according to article 6, it is necessary to choose and appoint Sultan from the descendants of Sultan Alaeddin Sulaiman Shah. If there are still no eligible successor, the Sultan must be appointed from the descendants of Sultan Abdul Samad and so on. The order of descendants, in descending order of degree of kinship are; Sultan Hisamuddin Alam Shah, Sultan Alauddin Sulaiman Shah, Sultan Abdul Samad, Sultan Ibrahim Shah, Sultan Salehuddin Shah. Article 7(6) states that no person shall be appointed as the Sultan by virtue of the provisions contained in Article 7 unless he is a male of acknowledged genuine and lawful blood.

Article 8 provides that if there are no one eligible to be Sultan under the provisions of Article 7, the choice and appointment of Sultan shall be left to consideration, judgement and decision of the Dewan Di-Raja. The chosen Sultan must; be a male of mature age, has a sound mind, of the Malay race and born in the State of Selangor, a subject of the former Sultan, professing the Muslim religion, of good blood, acknowledged to be legitimately and lawfully begotten, able to read and write the Malay language, possessing good and praiseworthy reputation, understanding, nature, temper, disposition and deportment. If the person chosen is not of a Royal Blood, the provisions of Article 5 shall not apply but the case shall be deemed to be a lawful exception of it.

Article 9 states that if the Sultan is to assumed the throne as a minor, that is before he has completed the full age of twenty one years (of which according to Muslim reckoning shall not be counted as an adult), a person must be appointed as a Regent or not less than three people as members of a Council of Regency until the Sultan is of age. The Regent and members of the Council of Regency must be of Malay race and born in the State of Selangor, professing the Muslim religion, and subjects to the Sultan but not necessarily of Royal Blood. He or they must be chosen by Dewan Di-Raja and appointed under the State Seal signed by the Menteri Besar. The appointment must be notified in the Gazette. The appointed Regent is held answerable for all acts of the Sultan during his minority State affairs, and if these acts are against the custom of the state or the Laws of the Constitution of Selangor, the Dewan Di-Raja may remove the regent and appoint someone else in his place.

Article 9A states that the Sultan must be installed according to the custom of the state within four years from the date of His Confirmation and Proclamation as Sultan or, with the consent of Dewan Di-raja, within four years after the Sultan complete full age of twenty one. If the Sultan is not installed within the time frame, he is deemed to have abdicated and relinquished His Royal rights and powers, and provisions of Article 11(4) will apply accordingly.

Article 10 prevent the Sultan from being absent from the State of Selangor for more than twelve consecutive calendar months. If he does so, a Successor must be chosen and appointed unless the Dewan Di-Raja deems the prolonged absence is due to sufficient and excusable cause. If the Sultan absent himself, he is deemed no longer to be the Sultan and to have relinquished his right and claims on the state, provided that the Legislative Assembly provide the Sultan an allowance that is no more than one fourth of his maintenance when he is in reign. The allowance must be charged on the Consolidated Fund. This Article does not apply when the Sultan is holding the office of the Yang di-Pertuan Agong.

Article 11 states that the Sultan may voluntarily abdicate and relinquish his Royal rights and powers, if he so desires. Article 11(4) provides that upon the notification of his abdication in the Gazette, he will be deemed no longer the Sultan of the state. He is entitled to an allowance for life, not more than one fourth of his maintenance when he is in reign, and charged to the Consolidated Fund. If he does not have a house of his own, he must be provided a suitable residence by the Legislative Assembly.

=== Chapter 2 - The Heir ===
Article 14 states that the Heir to the throne will use the title Raja Muda or in English, the Crown Prince of Selangor. The title is exclusive to the heir apparent and not to be used by anyone who is not actually been decided to succeed the Sultan. The Heir will be chosen and appointed by the Sultan after consultation with the Dewan Di-Raja. Article 15 provides that the heir does not have authority in state affairs unless he was explicitly commanded by the Sultan to do so. The Article does not apply if the heir was appointed to be in office of state, of which there will be no interference of the Heir to carry out his duty while he is in office.

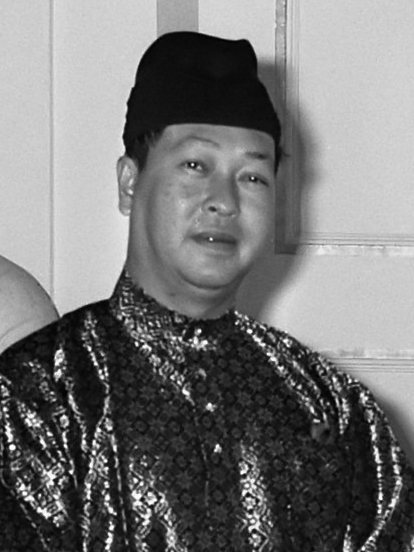
Tengku Abdul Aziz Shah was the Crown Prince when the Constitution was created in 1959. He ascended the throne in 1960 and assumed the title Sultan Salahuddin Abdul Aziz Shah. He was installed as the Yang di-Pertuan Agong in 1999 and died in 2001.

Article 16 provides that the Heir(s) shall be a person who is:

- a Malay
- of Royal Blood
- a descendant of Selangor Sultan
- a male
- professes the Muslim religion

Article 17 and 18 repeated the same succession order that was mentioned in Article 6 and 7, in which the order of succession is determined by agnatic primogeniture, and the order of the descendants in descending order of degree of kinship are; Sultan Hisamuddin Alam Shah, Sultan Alaeddin Sulaiman Shah, Sultan Abdul Samad, Sultan Ibrahim Shah and Sultan Salehuddin Shah. Article 18(6) states that no person shall be appointed as the Heir by virtue of the provisions contained in Article 18 unless he is a male of acknowledged genuine and lawful blood.

Article 19 prevented the Heir from being absent from the State of Selangor for more than twelve consecutive calendar months. If he does so, another heir must be chosen and appointed unless the Dewan Di-Raja deems the prolonged absence is due to sufficient and excusable cause. If the Heir absent himself, he is deemed no longer to be the Heir and to have relinquished his right and claims on the state, provided that the Legislative Assembly provide the Heir an allowance that is no more than one fourth of his maintenance when he is in reign. The allowance must be charged on the Consolidated Fund.

Article 20 states that the Heir may voluntarily abdicate and relinquish his Royal rights and powers, if he so desires. Article 20(4) provides that upon the notification of his abdication in the Gazette, he will be deemed no longer the Heir of the state. He is entitled to an allowance for life, not more than one fourth of his maintenance when he was the Heir, and charged to the Consolidated Fund. If he does not have a house of his own, he must be provided a suitable residence by the Legislative Assembly.

=== Chapter 3 - Regency ===
Article 21 states that there are three conditions of which Regent must be appointed:

1. if the Sultan will be absent from the state for more than 30 days
2. if the Sultan is incapacitated from attending state affairs
3. if the Sultan is elected as the Yang di-Pertuan Agong

In the first and third occasion, the Sultan need to appoint a Regent or a Council of Regency, of which seemed the most expedient to him. In case of the incapacitation of the Sultan, the responsibility of appointing a Regent or a Council of Regency falls to the Dewan Di-Raja. The Regent shall cease from power once the Sultan return to the state or upon his recovery. Article 22 states that if the Sultan assumed the position of Yang di-Pertuan Agong for more than 15 days, his position in Majlis Raja-Raja (the Conference of Rulers) must be taken by the Regent.

=== Chapter 4 - Dewan Di-Raja ===
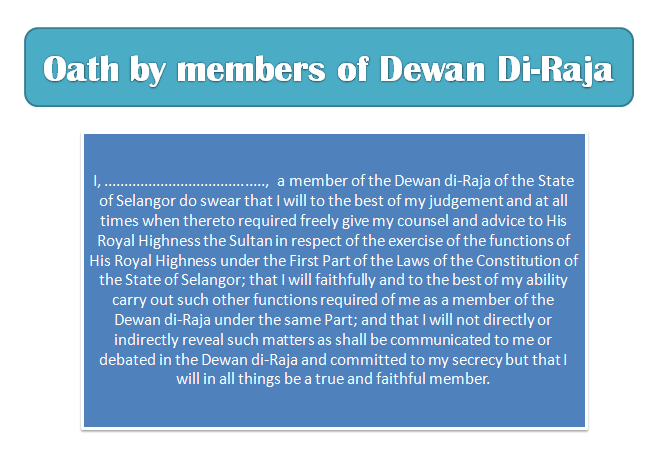
English translation of the oath taken by members of the Dewan di-Raja.

Article 23 provides that the Dewan Di-Raja was established to aid and advice the Sultan in carrying out his duty. Article 24 states that the member of the Dewan Di-Raja consist of:

- the Raja Muda, the Tengku Laksamana, the Tengku Bendahara, the Menteri Besar, MAIS (Selangor Islamic Council) Chairman and Mufti Selangor as ex-officio members
- four other Heirs
- five District Chieftains
- seven elders

Article 26 provides that the tenure of membership of the council for the non ex-officio members are for three years from the date he is appointed. The seat other than ex-officio members are considered vacant when either the death of the member, through resignation, when the member becomes a member of Selangor State Legislative Assembly or Dewan Rakyat, or being absent from the state without permission from the Sultan for more than one month. Article 27 provides that the Sultan may appoint a qualified person to be a member when there is vacancy.

Article 28 provides that only the Sultan may call the meeting of the Dewan Di-Raja. The Raja Muda may call the meeting if the purpose of the meeting is to choose a Regent or the discussion of the meeting is pertaining to matters affecting the Sultan or the meeting is deliberately made for the Sultan to not attend. The Dewan Di-Raja must meet in Klang under twenty four hours of the death of a Sultan. The vacancies of seat(s) will not disqualify any meeting of the Dewan Di-Raja but at least 10 members of the Dewan Di-Raja must present for each meeting. In the occasion where the meeting is to choose a new Sultan, two-thirds of the members must be present.

Article 30 states that upon the death or abdication of the Sultan, a meeting of Dewan Di-Raja must be called. The Dewan Di-Raja must confirm the Heir as the new Sultan unless after a full enquiry, the members deemed the Heir to be disqualified from the position as mentioned in Article 6. If the Dewan Di-Raja refused to confirm the Heir, they must confirm the next heir as the Sultan in accordance to Article 7.

Article 33 provided that the Sultan may act in opposition of the advice given by the Dewan Di-Raja, provided that he explained His decision to the members. If the members still does not agree with the Sultan's decision, they may recorded the advice given and the explanation given by the Sultan to oppose the advice in the minutes meeting for future references.

=== Chapter 5 - Titles and Honours ===
Article 38 states that the Sultan is the fountain of honour and dignity within the state. Only the Sultan is able to confer titles and dignities, and institute Orders, and Badges of Honours and Dignity. Article 39 provides that the Sultan may also degrade any rank or titles conferred to a person under Article 38 after consulting with the Dewan Di-Raja. Example of this case is when Selangor's ninth Sultan, Sultan Sharafuddin Idris Shah retracted the Order of Sultan Salahuddin Abdul Aziz Shah that was given to Malaysia's then head of opposition Anwar Ibrahim, for questioning the integrity of the state's ruler during Selangor's political crisis otherwise known as Kajang Move in 2014.

=== Chapter 6 - Consorts of The Sultan and Raja Muda ===
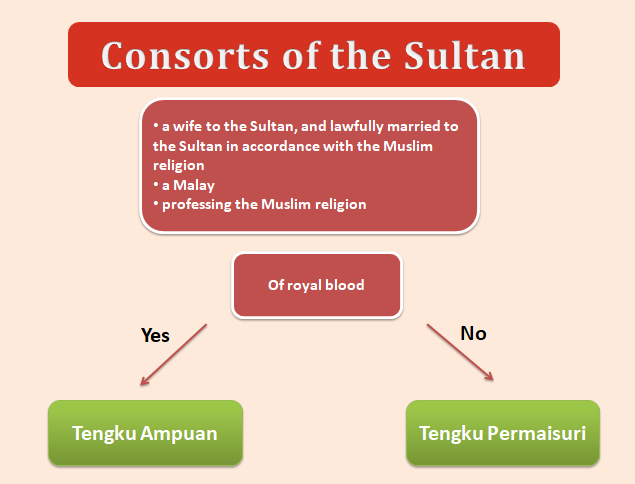
Diagram describing the appointment of consorts of the Sultan of Selangor to Tengku Ampuan and Tengku Permaisuri

==== Tengku Ampuan ====
Article 41 provided that the Sultan may appoint one of his consorts as the Tengku Ampuan.

The Tengku Ampuan must be:

- a wife to the Sultan, and lawfully married to the Sultan in accordance with the Muslim religion
- of Royal Blood
- a Malay
- professing the Muslim religion

The Tengku Ampuan is entitled to an allowance, of which the amount are determined by the Legislative Assembly and be charged under Consolidated Fund. She must cease from receiving allowance when either the Sultan die, the Sultan voluntarily proclaim abdication to the throne, upon divorce, or on revocation of her title. Article 42 provides that the cessation of appointment of the Tengku Ampuan will occur when either upon the re-marriage after the death of the Sultan, when the Sultan voluntarily proclaim abdication to the throne, or upon divorce. The Sultan also is able to revoke the appointment of Tengku Ampuan at any time.

==== Tengku Permaisuri ====
Under the Article 43A, if the Sultan marries a woman not of royal blood, she may be appointed to be a Tengku Permaisuri.

The Tengku Permaisuri must be:

- a wife to the Sultan, and lawfully married to the Sultan in accordance with the Muslim religion
- a Malay
- professing the Muslim religion

On the occasion where a Tengku Permaisuri was appointed but a Tengku Ampuan was not, the Tengku Permaisuri is entitled to an allowance, of which the amount are determined by the Legislative Assembly and be charged under Consolidated Fund. The provisions in Article 41 and 42 also applied mutatis mutandis to Tengku Permaisuri in this case. The Tengku Permaisuri can be given any specialty and benefit that was enjoyed by the Tengku Ampuan.

==== Raja Puan Muda ====
Article 44 provides that the Sultan may appoint any consort of the Raja Muda to be Raja Puan Muda, provided that she is of royal blood, a Malay and professes the Muslim religion. The cessation of appointment of the Raja Puan Muda will occur when either upon the re-marriage after the death of the Raja Muda, when the Raja Muda is removed from his office, or upon divorce.

== The Government ==
=== Chapter 1 - Religion of the state ===
Article 47 declares that Islam is the religion of the state but other religions may be practiced in peace and harmony.

Article 48 provides that the Sultan is the head of religion of the state. The Sultan may create laws to govern Muslims in respect of Islamic law. He may also establish a council, called "Council of Religion of Islam" to help and advice him in matters regarding to the religion of the state. On the occasion when the Sultan was appointed as the Yang di-Pertuan Agong, he will continue to exercise his function as the head of religion of the state.

=== Chapter 2 - The state seal ===
Circulation letter, dated 5 September 2017, by the state secretary to all government officers regarding the usage of the Public Seal of the state of Selangor

Article 49 states that the state seal must be kept by the Sultan and the seal must be used in all occasion that needs sealing. The state seal must bear the inscription "Mohor Kerajaan Negeri Selangor", and words "State of Selangor Public Seal".

=== Chapter 3 - Executive ===
Article 50 provides that the executive authority of the state is vested in the Sultan. He can exercise his authority unless provided otherwise by the Federal Constitution or the state constitution. The executive functions may also be conferred to other person or authorities in accordance to law.

Article 51 provides prerogative to the Sultan to appoint the Menteri Besar of Selangor under His Sign Manual and state seal, in accordance with Article 53(2). He may also appoint a deputy Menteri Besar under the same condition. Under Article 53(4), a Menteri Besar must be a Muslim and of Malay race.

Article 52 states that there must be a State Secretary, a State Legal Adviser and a State Financial Officer, and their appointment should be made by the appropriate Service Commission from any of the relevant public services.

- The State Secretary must be of Malay race and professing Muslim religion. He will be the principal officer in charge of the administrative affairs of the state.
- The State Legal Adviser will give advice on legal matters that is referred to him by the sultan or the state government
- The State Financial Officer will be the principal officer in charge of the financial affairs of the state.

The State Secretary, State Legal Adviser and State Financial Officer will take Oath of Secrecy in front of the Menteri Besar before attending any Selangor State Executive Council meeting.

Article 53 states that the Sultan must appoint a state executive council.

The Sultan must first appoint a Menteri Besar to preside over the council, who must be a member of the state legislative assembly and in his judgement, is trusted by the majority of the members of the assembly. Any person who becomes a citizen by naturalisation or registration under Article 17 of the Federal Constitution is automatically ineligible to be a Menteri Besar. Article 53(4) also states that appointment of the Menteri Besar is a prerogative of the Sultan, and he may dispense with any provision in the constitution that restricts him to do so. If the Menteri Besar ceases to command the confidence of the majority of the members of the Legislative Assembly, he must tender his resignation to the State Council, unless the Sultan dissolves the Legislative Assembly at his request.

Under the advice of the Menteri Besar, the Sultan must then appoint four to ten other council members from among the members of the assembly. The Sultan may also appoint a Deputy Menteri Besar if he is advised to do so by the Menteri Besar. The Deputy Menteri Besar must assist the Menteri Besar in exercising his powers, performing his duty and carrying out his functions.

Any member of the state council other than the Menteri Besar, shall hold office at the sultan's' pleasure, but they are free to resign at any time. A member of the state council must also not engage in any trade, business, or profession connected with any subject or department for which he is responsible of. He cannot take part in any decision made by the Executive Council relating to the trade, business, or profession as long as he still engages in them.

Article 54A provides that Menteri Besar can appoint a person to be a political secretary. The political secretary can resign at any time but otherwise must held his position until the appointment duration determined by the Menteri Besar. His duty and function will be determined by the state executive council. Article 55 states that the Sultan must act on advice of the executive council or a member who is acting under authority of the executive council, in exercising his function under the Constitution, or any law, or as a member of the Conference of Rulers.

The Sultan may act in his discretion in the following matters:

1. the appointment of Menteri Besar
2. withholding of consent to a request for the dissolution of the Legislative Assembly
3. making a request for a meeting of the Conference of Rulers, concerning solely their privileges, positions, honours, and dignities, or religious acts, observance or ceremonies
4. any function as Head of the Muslim religion or relating to the custom of the Malays
5. the appointment of an heir or heirs, consort, Regent, or council of regency
6. the appointment of persons to Malay customary ranks, titles, honours and dignities, and the designation of the functions related to them
7. the regulations of royal courts and palaces

=== Chapter 4 - The power of pardon ===
The Sultan may grant a pardon, reprieve or respite in respect of any offense committed in the state, except any offenses which has been tried by Court Martial. Any power conferred by federal or state law to remit, suspend or commute the sentence for any such offense is exercisable by the Sultan. He must act on the advice of the Pardon Board constituted for the state.

The Pardon Board constituted for the state consist of:

- Attorney General of the Federation
- Menteri Besar
- not more than three members appointed by the Sultan

The Attorney General may from time to time delegate his functions of the Board to any other person.

The members of the Pardon Board who are appointed by the Sultan are appointed for three years term and may be re-appointed. They are also free to resign at any moment. In the occasion when any member appointed by Him are absent or unable to act, The sultan may appoint any person to exercise temporarily the functions of the member.

A member of Legislative Assembly or Dewan Rakyat are ineligible to be a member of the pardon board, or to exercise the function of a board member temporarily.

=== Chapter 5 - The Legislature ===
The Legislature of the state consist of the Sultan and one House known as the Legislative Assembly. The legislative assembly consist of members elected through elections. Every citizen of or over the age of twenty one, who is resident of Selangor are eligible to be a member of the legislative assembly. A person must not be a member of more than one constituency of the legislative assembly at one time.

A person is disqualified to be a member if:

1. he is and has been found or declared as to be unsound of mind
2. he is an undischarged bankrupt
3. he holds an office of profit
4. after having nominated for election, he failed to lodge any return of election expenses within time and manner required by law (Note: The disqualification may be removed by the Sultan or if it is not removed, ceased after five years.)
5. he is disqualified under any law relating to offenses in connection with elections, have been convicted or have been proved guilty of such offenses
6. he has voluntarily acquired citizenship of a foreign country, or exercised rights of citizenship in a foreign country, or has made a declaration of allegiance to a foreign country

If a person dies or becomes disqualified for membership of the legislative assembly, his seat will become vacant. If a member fail to attend every sitting for a period of six month, without the permission of the Speaker, his seat will be declared vacant by the speaker. A person who resigns his membership of the legislative assembly, will be disqualified from being a member for the five years period starting from the date on which his resignation takes effect.

The Sultan may summon the legislative assembly and shall not allow six month to elapse between sitting sessions. He may also prorogue or dissolve the legislative assembly. Unless sooner dissolved, the assembly will continue from the date of its first sitting for five years and shall then stand dissolved. An election will be held within sixty days from the dissolution and the new legislative assembly will be summoned to meet not more than ninety days from that date.

A casual vacancy must be filled within sixty days from the date on which it occurs. Example of occasions when this law comes into use are during Kajang by-election, 2014 and Sungai Kandis by-election, 2018.

==== Speaker ====
The Legislative Assembly may from time to time elect a person of eligibility to become a Speaker of the assembly. A speaker may not be elected to be a Speaker unless he is a member or qualified to be a member of the legislative assembly. The speaker may resign at any time. He must vacate his office when either the legislative assembly first meet after a general election, or upon being disqualified to be a speaker, or upon the dissolution of the assembly, or on his ceasing to be a member of assembly other than because of the dissolution of the legislative assembly or ceased to be qualified of a member. A Deputy Speaker may also be chosen from any member of the legislative assembly.

The first ever speaker of Dewan Negeri Selangor is Dato' Abdullah Haji Hassan, who served from 8 July 1959 to 17 November 1962.

== See also ==
- Constitution of Malaysia
- Law of Malaysia
- Sultan of Selangor
- Selangor State Executive Council
- Selangor State Legislative Assembly
