= Menteri Besar of Selangor =

Head of Malaysian state government

Menteri Besar of the State of Selangor Darul Ehsan
- Menteri Besar Negeri Selangor Darul Ehsan
- Coat of arms of Selangor
- Incumbent; Amirudin Shari since 19 June 2018
- Government of Selangor
- Style: Yang Amat Berhormat (The Most Honourable)
- Member of: Selangor State Executive Council
- Reports to: Selangor State Legislative Assembly
- Residence: Jalan Permata 7/1, Seksyen 7, 40000 Shah Alam, Selangor
- Seat: Tingkat 21, Bangunan Sultan Salahuddin Abdul Aziz Shah, 40503 Shah Alam, Selangor
- Nominator: State Assemblymen of Selangor
- Appointer: Sultan of Selangor
- Term length: 5 years or lesser, renewable once (while commanding the confidence of the Selangor State Legislative Assembly With State Elections held no more than five years apart)
- Constituting instrument: Laws of the Constitution of Selangor 1959
- Inaugural holder: Hamzah Abdullah
- Formation: June 1947; 79 years ago
- Deputy: Vacant
- Salary: RM 25,000.00
- Website: www.selangor.gov.my/index.php/pages/view/82

The Menteri Besar of Selangor, also referred to as the First Minister of Selangor is the head of government in the Malaysian state of Selangor.

The Menteri Besar acts as a majority leader in the Selangor Assembly.

According to convention, the Menteri Besar is the leader of the majority party or largest coalition party of the Selangor State Legislative Assembly.

The 17th and current Menteri Besar of Selangor is Amirudin Shari, who took office on 19 June 2018.

== Appointment ==
According to the state constitution, the Sultan of Selangor shall first appoint the Menteri Besar to preside over the Executive Council and requires such Menteri Besar to be:

1. A member of the Legislative Assembly who in his judgment is likely to command the confidence of the majority of the members of the Assembly,
2. An ethnic Malay who professes the religion of Islam and
3. Not a Malaysian citizen by naturalisation, or by registration under Article 17 of the Federal Constitution.

But the Sultan may in his discretion dispense the second requirement and appoint a non-Malay and non-Muslim as Menteri Besar.

The member of the Executive Council must take and subscribe in the presence of the Sultan the oath of office and allegiance as well as the oath of secrecy before they can exercise the functions of office. The Executive Council shall be collectively responsible to the Legislative Assembly. The members of the Executive Council shall not hold any office of profit and engage in any trade, business or profession that will cause conflict of interest.

If a government cannot get its appropriation (budget) legislation passed by the Legislative Assembly, or the Legislative Assembly passes a vote of "no confidence" in the government, the Menteri Besar is bound by convention to resign immediately. The Sultan's choice of replacement Menteri Besar will be dictated by the circumstances. A member of the Executive Council other than the Menteri Besar shall hold office during the pleasure of the Sultan, unless the appointment of any member of the Executive Council shall have been revoked by the Sultan on the advice of the Menteri Besar but may at any time resign his office.

Following a resignation in other circumstances, defeated in an election or the death of the Menteri Besar, the Sultan will generally appoint as Menteri Besar the person voted by the governing party as their new leader.

== Powers ==
The power of the Menteri Besar is subject to a number of limitations. Menteri Besar removed as leader of his or her party, or whose government loses a vote of no confidence in the Legislative Assembly, must advise a state election or resign the office or be dismissed by the Sultan. The defeat of a supply bill (one that concerns the spending of money) or unable to pass important policy-related legislation is seen to require the resignation of the government or dissolution of Legislative Assembly, much like a non-confidence vote, since a government that cannot spend money is hamstrung, also called loss of supply.

The Menteri Besar's party will normally have a majority in the Legislative Assembly and party discipline is exceptionally strong in Selangor politics, so passage of the government's legislation through the Legislative Assembly is mostly a formality.

== Caretaker Menteri Besar ==
The legislative assembly unless sooner dissolved by the Sultan with His Majesty's own discretion on the advice of the Menteri Besar shall continue for five years from the date of its first meeting. The state constitution permits a delay of 60 days of general election to be held from the date of dissolution and the legislative assembly shall be summoned to meet on a date not later than 120 days from the date of dissolution. Conventionally, between the dissolution of one legislative assembly and the convening of the next, the Menteri Besar and the executive council remain in office in a caretaker capacity.

== List of Menteri Besar of Selangor ==
The following is the list of Menteris Besar of Selangor since 1947:

Colour key (for political parties):
Independent / Alliance / Barisan Nasional Pakatan Rakyat Pakatan Harapan

No.	Portrait	Name (Birth–Death) Constituency	Term of office			Party (Note: This column names only the Menteri Besar's party. The state government he heads may be a complex coalition of several parties and independents; those are not listed here.)	Election	Assembly
No.	Portrait	Name (Birth–Death) Constituency	Took office	Left office	Time in office	Party	Election	Assembly
1		Hamzah Abdullah (1890–1971)	June; 1949	1 July 1949		Independent	–	–
2		Raja Uda (1894–1976)	1 July 1949	March; 1953		Independent	–	–
3		Othman Mohamad (1905-1981)	March; 1953	September; 1954		Alliance (UMNO)	–	–
4		Raja Uda (1894–1976)	September; 1954	August; 1955		Independent	–	–
5		Abdul Aziz Abdul Majid (1908–1975)	August; 1955	1956		Alliance (UMNO)	–	–
6		Muhammad Ismail Abdul Latiff (1894–1976)	1956	1958	2 years	Alliance (UMNO)	–	–
7		Abdul Jamil Abdul Rais (1912–1994)	1958	May; 1959		Alliance (UMNO)	–	–
8		Abu Bakar Baginda (1899–1972); MLA for Dengkil	30 May 1959	19 March 1964	4 years, 295 days	Alliance (UMNO)	1959	1st
9		Dato' Seri; Harun Idris (1925–2003); MLA for Morib	19 March 1964	24 March 1976	12 years, 6 days	Alliance (UMNO)	1964	2nd
9		Dato' Seri; Harun Idris (1925–2003); MLA for Morib	19 March 1964	24 March 1976	12 years, 6 days	Alliance (UMNO)	1969	3rd
9		Dato' Seri; Harun Idris (1925–2003); MLA for Morib	19 March 1964	24 March 1976	12 years, 6 days	BN (UMNO)	1974	4th
10		Dato' Seri; Hormat Rafei (1923–2001); MLA for Banting	15 April 1976	3 May 1982	6 years, 19 days	BN (UMNO)	–	4th
10		Dato' Seri; Hormat Rafei (1923–2001); MLA for Banting	15 April 1976	3 May 1982	6 years, 19 days	BN (UMNO)	1978	5th
11		Tan Sri Dato' Seri; Ahmad Razali Mohamad Ali (1928–2001); MLA for Ampang	4 May 1982	13 August 1986	4 years, 102 days	BN (UMNO)	1982	6th
12		Tan Sri Dato' Seri; Muhammad Muhammad Taib (born 1945); MLA for Batang Kali	14 August 1986	14 April 1997	10 years, 243 days	BN (UMNO)	1986	7th
12		Tan Sri Dato' Seri; Muhammad Muhammad Taib (born 1945); MLA for Batang Kali	14 August 1986	14 April 1997	10 years, 243 days	BN (UMNO)	1990	8th
12		Tan Sri Dato' Seri; Muhammad Muhammad Taib (born 1945); MLA for Batang Kali	14 August 1986	14 April 1997	10 years, 243 days	BN (UMNO)	1995	9th
13		Tan Sri Dato' Seri; Abu Hassan Omar (1940–2018); MLA for Permatang	6 June 1997	9 August 2000	3 years, 65 days	BN (UMNO)	–	9th
13		Tan Sri Dato' Seri; Abu Hassan Omar (1940–2018); MLA for Permatang	6 June 1997	9 August 2000	3 years, 65 days	BN (UMNO)	1999	10th
14		Dr. Mohamad Khir Toyo (born 1965); MLA for Sungai Panjang	18 August 2000	13 March 2008	7 years, 209 days	BN (UMNO)	–	10th
14		Dr. Mohamad Khir Toyo (born 1965); MLA for Sungai Panjang	18 August 2000	13 March 2008	7 years, 209 days	BN (UMNO)	2004	11th
15		Tan Sri Dato' Seri; Abdul Khalid Ibrahim (1946–2022); MLA for Ijok (2008–2013); MLA for Pelabuhan Klang (2013–2018)	13 March 2008	23 September 2014	6 years, 195 days	PR (PKR)	2008	12th
15		Tan Sri Dato' Seri; Abdul Khalid Ibrahim (1946–2022); MLA for Ijok (2008–2013); MLA for Pelabuhan Klang (2013–2018)	13 March 2008	23 September 2014	6 years, 195 days	PR (PKR)	2013	13th
16		Dato' Seri; Mohamed Azmin Ali (born 1964); MLA for Bukit Antarabangsa	23 September 2014	18 June 2018	3 years, 269 days	PR (PKR)	–	13th
16		Dato' Seri; Mohamed Azmin Ali (born 1964); MLA for Bukit Antarabangsa	23 September 2014	18 June 2018	3 years, 269 days	PH (PKR)	2018	14th
17		Dato' Seri; Amirudin Shari (born 1980); MLA for Sungai Tua	19 June 2018	Incumbent	8 years, 143 days	PH (PKR)	–	14th
17		Dato' Seri; Amirudin Shari (born 1980); MLA for Sungai Tua	19 June 2018	Incumbent	8 years, 143 days	PH (PKR)	2023	15th

== Living former Menteri Besar ==
Name	Term of office	Date of birth
Muhammad Muhammad Taib	1986–1997	29 July 1945 (age 81)
Mohamed Khir Toyo	2000–2008	6 August 1965 (age 61)
Mohamed Azmin Ali	2014–2018	25 August 1964 (age 62)
