= 2013 Selangor state election =

Malaysian state legislative election

- 5 May 2013

All 56 seats in the Selangor State Legislative Assembly 29 seats needed for a majority
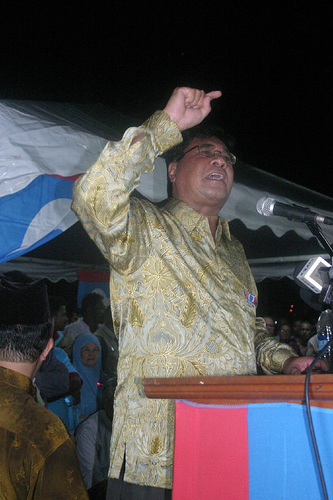

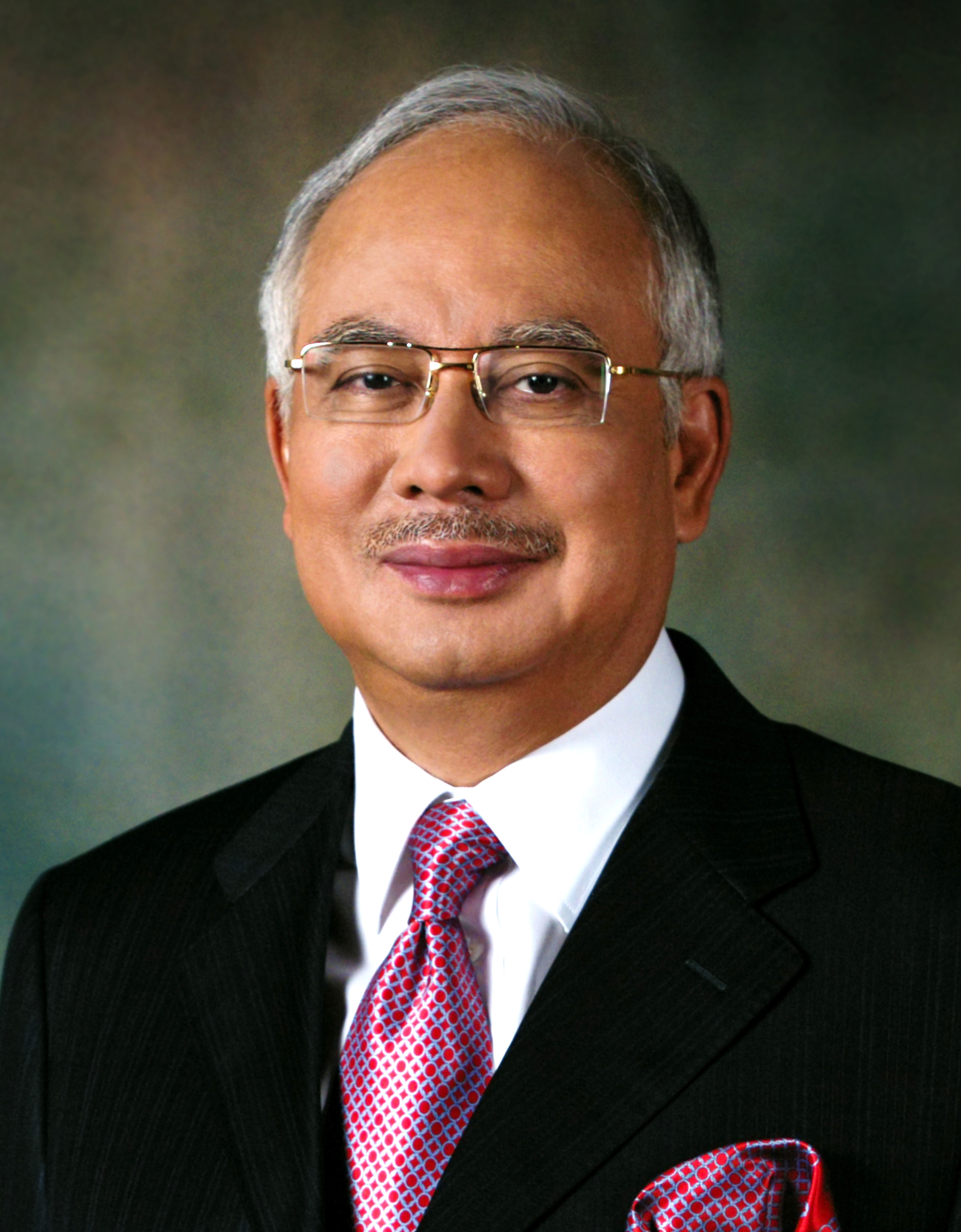
	First party	Second party
Leader	Abdul Khalid Ibrahim	Najib Razak (as Selangor BN chairman)
Party	Pakatan Rakyat	BN
Leader's seat	Ijok (ran in Port Klang, won)	not running
Last election	36 seats, 56.0%	20 seats, 43.8%
Seats before	34	21
Seats won	44	12
Seat change	▲8	▼8
Popular vote	1,056,233	693,956
Percentage	59.9%	39.4%
Swing	▲3.9	▼4.4
Menteri Besar before election
Abdul Khalid Ibrahim
Pakatan Rakyat
Menteri Besar-designate
Abdul Khalid Ibrahim
Pakatan Rakyat

The 13th Selangor state election was held on 5 May 2013. The Selangor State Legislative Assembly would automatically dissolve on 22 April 2013, the fifth anniversary of the first sitting, and elections must be held within sixty days (two months) of the dissolution; on or before 22 June 2013, with the date to be decided by the Election Commission of Malaysia, unless dissolved prior to that date by the Head of State, Sultan of Selangor on the advice of the Head of Government, Menteri Besar of Selangor.

The incumbent party's unofficial coalition Pakatan Rakyat won a supermajority of 44 seats and was able to form a government, securing a second term while the opposition Barisan Nasional won 12 seats.

== Background ==
The state election is the 13th state election in Selangor since the independence of Malaya (now Malaysia) in 1957. The governing Pakatan Rakyat (PR) will seek to secure their second consecutive term in office since 2008. According to the Laws of the Constitution of Selangor 1959, the maximum term of the Selangor State Legislative Assembly, the legislature of Selangor, is five years from the date of the first sitting of Assembly following a state election, after which it is dissolved by operation of law. The Assembly would have been automatically dissolved on 22 April 2013, the fifth anniversary of its first sitting on 22 April 2008.

=== Electoral system ===
Each state constituencies of Selangor will elect one member to the Selangor State Legislative Assembly using the first-past-the-post voting system. If one party obtains a majority of seats, then that party is entitled to form the State Government, with its leader as Menteri Besar. If the election results in no single party having a majority, there is a hung assembly, of which will be dissolved under the royal prerogative of the Sultan.

=== Voting Eligibility ===
To vote in the state election, one had to be:

- registered in the electoral roll as an elector in the constituency in which he resides on;
- aged 21 or over on the registration date;
- a resident of the constituency, or if not so, an absentee voter;
- not disqualified under any law relating to offences committed in connection with elections.

== Results ==
Party or alliance		Seats	+/–
Pakatan Rakyat	People's Justice Party	14	–1
Pakatan Rakyat	Pan-Malaysian Islamic Party	15	+7
Pakatan Rakyat	Democratic Action Party	15	+2
Pakatan Rakyat	Total	44	+8
Barisan Nasional	United Malays National Organisation	12	–6
Barisan Nasional	Malaysian Chinese Association	0	–2
Barisan Nasional	Parti Gerakan Rakyat Malaysia	0	0
Barisan Nasional	Malaysian Indian Congress	0	0
Barisan Nasional	People's Progressive Party	0	0
Barisan Nasional	Total	12	–8
Socialist Party of Malaysia		0	0
People's Welfare Party		0	0
Pan-Malaysian Islamic Front		0	0
Independents		0	0
Total		56	0
