= Ijok =

Coordinates: 3°19′18.5″N 101°24′48.9″E

- Mukim / Subdistrict

Other transcription(s)
  - Jawi: ايجوق
  - Chinese: 依约 (Simplified) 依約 (Traditional)
  - Tamil: ஈஜோக்
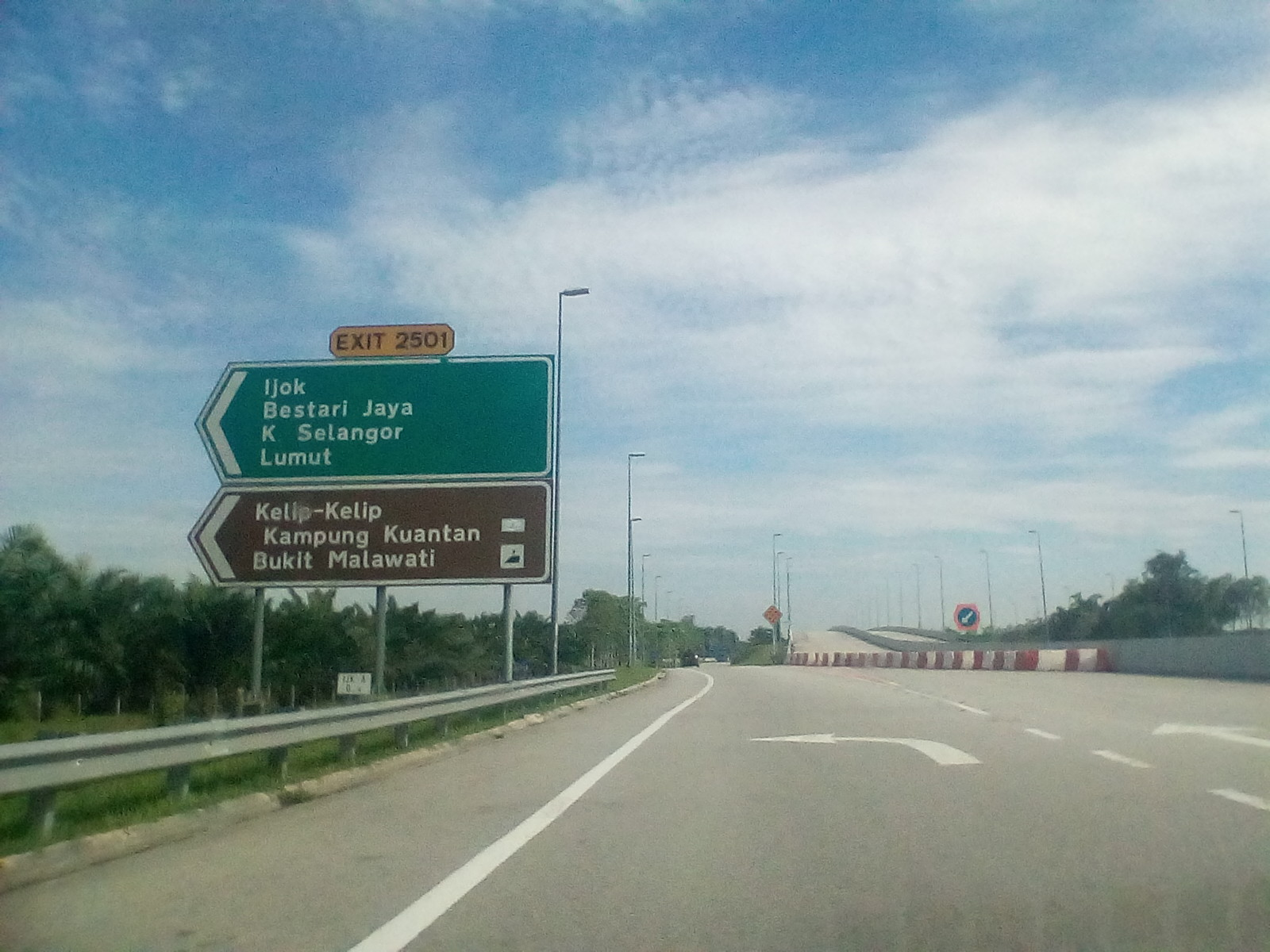
- Ijok Interchange in LATAR
- Interactive map of Ijok
- Country: Malaysia
- State: Selangor
- District: Kuala Selangor

Ijok in Kuala Selangor District

Ijok is a mukim in Kuala Selangor District, Selangor, Malaysia. It is located along Federal Route 54.

Sited at a junction that leads to the bigger and more developed Bestari Jaya (Batang Berjuntai), Pekan Ijok is, in a sense, a 'cowboy town' with a main street lined with shops and small buildings on both sides.

== Demographics ==
The Malays here are largely of Javanese stock, and claim their forefathers from Indonesia founded the town in the early 1900s. Many are smallholders or work on their own land while some work in local shops and factories. The Chinese came to do business or to open vegetable farms and have since stayed to set up home here. Likewise, the Indians have also found home here after the earlier settlers came to work in the rubber plantations. The constituency has 12,372 voters, 52 percent of whom are ethnic Malays, with 28 percent ethnic Indians and 21 percent Chinese- the biggest percentage of Indian voters in the Malaysian state or Parliament constituency.

== Education ==
- Sekolah Kebangsaan Bukit Badong
- Sekolah Kebangsaan Ijok
- Sekolah Jenis Kebangsaan (C) Ijok
- Sekolah Rendah Agama Bukit Badong
- Sekolah Rendah Agama Ijok
- Sekolah Rendah Agama Kafa Al-hilal

== Events ==
- 28 April - Ijok by-election, 2007.
