= Adei Plantation and Industry =

Indonesian palm oil company

PT Adei Plantation and Industry (PT API) is a palm oil company from Indonesia. It is a subsidiary of Malaysia's Kuala Lumpur Kepong Berhad (KLK).

Around 2003, 70% (19,432 hectares) of PT API's land in Riau was on peat soil. It owned 27760 hectares of land in Riau in around 2009. According to a police spokesperson, there was enough evidence on PT API's’s involvement for its use of illegal slash-and-burn methods to clear land for cultivation. It one of the few companies that have ever been successfully prosecuted for open burning so far. The company was found guilty of fires on its land in October 2001. Mr C. Gobi, the general manager, was sentenced to a two-year imprisonment, which was reduced to eight months. The company was fined $27,000, which was reduced to $11,000. Another general manager of the company was found guilty of causing forest fires in 2014.
