= Rankings of universities in Malaysia =

Universities in Malaysia are ranked in a number of ways, including both national and international ranks.

== Overall Summary ==
World Ranking (Note: Only Top 5 from each ranking will be shown.)
Institution	THE 2025	QS 2025	ARWU 2024
University of Malaya	251–300	60	401-500
Universiti Kebangsaan Malaysia	401–500	138	601-700
Universiti Putra Malaysia	501–600	148	601-700
Universiti Sains Malaysia	401–500	146	701-800
Universiti Teknologi Malaysia	401–500	181	-
Sunway University	401–500	539	901–1000
Universiti Tunku Abdul Rahman	1001–1200	801-850	-

== International Rankings ==
=== Times Higher Education World University Rankings now ===
World Ranking (Note: Order shown in accordance with the latest result.)
Institution	2016	2017	2018	2019	2020	2021
University of Malaya	-	-	351-400	301-350	301-350	301-350
Universiti Tunku Abdul Rahman	-	-	501-600	501-600	501-600	501-600
Universiti Kebangsaan Malaysia	601-800	601-800	601-800	601-800	601-800	601-800
Universiti Putra Malaysia	601-800	601-800	601-800	801-1000	601-800	601-800
Universiti Sains Malaysia	601-800	601-800	601-800	601-800	601-800	601-800
Universiti Teknologi Malaysia	401-500	601-800	601-800	601-800	601-800	601-800
Universiti Teknologi PETRONAS	-	601-800	601-800	601-800	601-800	601-800
Universiti Utara Malaysia	-	801+	1001+	801-1000	801-1000	601-800
Universiti Tenaga Nasional	-	-	801-1000	801-1000	801-1000	801-1000
Universiti Kuala Lumpur	-	-	-	-	-	1001+
Universiti Malaysia Perlis	-	-	-	-	601-800	1001+
Universiti Malaysia Sarawak	-	-	-	1001+	1001+	1001+
Multimedia University	-	-	-	-	1001+	1001+
Universiti Teknikal Malaysia Melaka	-	-	-	-	-	1001+
Universiti Teknologi MARA	601-800	801+	-	1001+	1001+	1001+

=== Times Higher Education World University Rankings by Subjects ===
World Ranking
	2018		2019		2020		2021		2022	
Discipline	Rank	Institute	Rank	Institute	Rank	Institute	Rank	Institute	Rank	Institute
Arts & Humanities	301-400; 301-400; 301-400	UKM; UM; UTM	201-250; 201-250; 251-300; 301-400; 401+ 401+ 401+	UM; UTM; USM; UKM; UPM; UiTM; UUM	251-300; 251-300; 301-400; 301-400; 401+	UM; USM; UKM; UPM; UiTM	301-400; 301-400; 301-400; 401-500; 501+	UKM; UM; USM; UPM; UiTM	251-300; 251-300; 301-400; 301-400; 501+	UKM; UM; UPM; USM; UiTM
Business & Economics	176-200	UM	151-175; 201-250; 301-400; 401-500; 401-500; 401-500; 501+	UM; UTM; USM; UKM; UPM; UUM; UiTM	126-150; 151-175; 251-300; 301-400; 401-500; 501+ 501+ 501+ 501+ 501+	UTM; UM; USM; UPM; UUM; UKM; UniMAS; MMU; UiTM; UTAR	126-150; 201-250; 201-250; 251-300; 301-400; 501-600; 501-600; 501-600; 601+ 601+ 601+	UM; USM; UTM; UUM; UPM; UKM; UniKL; UTAR; UniMAS; MMU; UiTM	151-175; 176-200; 201-250; 201-250; 251-300; 501-600; 501-600; 601+ 601+ 601+ 601+ 601+ 601+	UM; USM; UTM; UUM; UPM; UKM; UMT; UniMAS; MMU; UTeM; UiTM; UTAR; UTHM
Clinical & Health	301-400	UM	251-300; 401-500; 401-500; 501-600; 501-600	UM; UKM; USM; UPM; UiTM	176-200; 251-300; 301-400; 401-500; 401-500	UM; UKM; USM; UPM; UiTM	176-200; 301-400; 301-400; 401-500; 501-600	UM; UKM; USM; UiTM; UPM	176-200; 251-300; 301-400; 501-600; 601+	UM; UKM; USM; UPM; UiTM
Computer Science	126-150	UM	101-125; 401-500; 401-500; 501-600; 501-600; 501-600; 601+ 601+ 601+	UM; UTM; UTP; UKM; UPM; USM; UiTM; UNITEN; UUM	126-150; 401-500; 401-500; 501-600; 501-600; 601+ 601+ 601+ 601+ 601+	UM; USM; UTM; UKM; UTP; MMU; UPM; UiTM; UNITEN; UUM	126-150; 401-500; 401-500; 501-600; 501-600; 601-800; 601-800; 601-800; 601-800; 801+ 801+	UM; UTM; UTP; UKM; USM; MMU; UPM; UNITEN; UUM; UniKL; UiTM	126-150; 301-400; 401-500; 401-500; 501-600; 601-800; 601-800; 601-800; 601-800; 601-800; 801+ 801+ 801+ 801+	UM; UTM; USM; UTP; UKM; UPM; UNITEN; UTAR; UTHM; UUM; UniKL; MMU; UTeM; UiTM
Education	-	-	126-150; 151-175; 301-400; 301-400; 301-400; 401+	UM; UTM; UKM; UPM; USM; UiTM	101-125; 176-200; 201-250; 301-400; 301-400; 301-400; 401+	UTM; UM; USM; UKM; UPM; UiTM; UUM	97; 126-150; 126-150; 251-300; 251-300; 301-400; 401-500	UM; USM; UTM; UKM; UPM; UUM; UiTM	94; 101-125; 176-200; 176-200; 201-250; 201-250; 301-400; 401-500; 501+	UM; UTM; UPSI; USM; UKM; UPM; UUM; UiTM; UTHM
Engineering	176-200; 401-500; 401-500; 401-500	UM; UPM; USM; UTP	151-175; 401-500; 501-600; 501-600; 501-600; 501-600; 501-600; 601-800; 801+ 801+	UM; UTP; UKM; UPM; USM; UTM; UNITEN; UTAR; UiTM; UniMAS	126-150; 401-500; 401-500; 401-500; 401-500; 501-600; 501-600; 601-800; 801+ 801+ 801+ 801+	UM; UPM; UTM; UTP; UNITEN; UKM; USM; UTAR; UniMAP; UniMAS; MMU; UiTM	151-175; 301-400; 301-400; 501-600; 501-600; 501-600; 601-800; 601-800; 601-800; 801-1000; 801-1000; 1001+ 1001+ 1001+	UM; UPM; UTP; UKM; UTM; UNITEN; MMU; USM; UTAR; UniKL; UniMAP; UniMAS; UTeM; UiTM	176-200; 301-400; 301-400; 501-600; 501-600; 501-600; 601-800; 601-800; 601-800; 801-1000; 801-1000; 1001+ 1001+ 1001+ 1001+ 1001+	UM; UPM; UTP; UKM; UTM; UNITEN; USM; UTAR; UMT; UniKL; MMU; UniMAP; UniMAS; UTeM; UiTM; UTHM
Life Sciences	301-400	UM	401-500; 501-600; 601+ 601+	UM; USM; UKM; UPM	401-500; 501-600; 601+ 601+	UM; UPM; UKM; USM	401-500; 401-500; 601-800; 601-800; 801+	UM; UPM; UKM; USM; UniMAS	501-600; 501-600; 601-800; 601-800; 801+ 801+ 801+	UM; UPM; UKM; USM; UniMAS; UiTM; UMT
Physical Sciences	301-400	UM	401-500; 501-600; 601-800; 601-800; 601-800; 601-800; 801+ 801+ 801+	UM; UTM; UKM; UPM; USM; UTP; UiTM; UTAR; UUM	301-400; 301-400; 601-800; 601-800; 601-800; 601-800; 801+ 801+ 801+ 801+	UM; UniMAP; UPM; USM; UTM; UTP; UKM; UiTM; UTAR; UUM	301-400; 501-600; 601-800; 601-800; 601-800; 601-800; 801-1000; 801-1000; 801-1000; 1001+	UM; UTM; UniMAP; UPM; UTP; UUM; UKM; USM; UTAR; UiTM	301-400; 501-600; 501-600; 501-600; 601-800; 601-800; 601-800; 801-1000; 801-1000; 801-1000; 801-1000; 1001+	UM; UniMAP; UTM; UTP; UKM; UPM; UUM; USM; UTAR; UMT; UTHM; UiTM
Psychology	-	-	201-250	UM	201-250	UM	251-300	UM	251-300	UM
Social Sciences	-	-	251-300; 401-500; 501-600; 501-600; 501-600; 601+	UM; USM; UKM; UPM; UUM; UiTM	201-250; 301-400; 401-500; 501-600; 501-600; 601+	UTM; UM; USM; UKM; UUM; UiTM	176-200; 301-400; 401-500; 401-500; 401-500; 501-600; 601+	UTM; UM; UPM; USM; UUM; UKM; UiTM	301-400; 401-500; 401-500; 501-600; 501-600; 601+ 601+ 601+ 601+ 601+	UTM; UM; UUM; UPM; USM; UKM; UniMAS; UiTM; UTAR; UMT

=== Times Higher Education Young University Rankings ===
- Formerly known as Times Higher Education 100 Under 50 University Rankings

Young Ranking
Institution	2012	2016	2017	2018	2019	2020	2021	2022
Universiti Teknologi Petronas	-	-	151-200	151-200	101-150	101-150	134	119
Universiti Utara Malaysia	-	-	-	-	201-250	201-250	161	170
Universiti Teknologi Malaysia	-	101-150	101-150	151-200	101-150	101-150	165	185
Universiti Tenaga Nasional	-	-	-	201-250	251-300	251-300	251-300	251-300
Universiti Malaysia Perlis	-	-	-	-	-	151-200	301-350	301-350
Universiti Tunku Abdul Rahman	-	-	101-150	101-150	101-150	101-150	147	351-400
Universiti Kuala Lumpur	-	-	-	-	-	-	401+	401+
Universiti Malaysia Sarawak	-	-	-	-	301+	351-400	401+	401+
Multimedia University	-	-	-	-	-	351-400	351-400	401+
Universiti Teknikal Malaysia Melaka	-	-	-	-	-	-	401+	401+
Universiti Teknologi MARA	-	-	-	-	301+	351-400	401+	401+
Universiti Malaysia Terengganu	-	-	-	-	-	-	-	401+
Universiti Tun Hussein Onn Malaysia	-	-	-	-	-	-	-	401+
University of Cyberjaya	-	-	-	-	-	-	-	Reporter
Lincoln University College	-	-	-	-	-	-	-	Reporter
Universiti Malaysia Kelantan	-	-	-	-	-	-	-	Reporter
Management & Science University	-	-	-	-	-	-	-	Reporter
Universiti Putra Malaysia	-	101-150	101-150	151-200	201-250	151-200	157	N/A
Universiti Kebangsaan Malaysia	98	-	151-200	151-200	151-200	151-200	N/A	N/A
Universiti Sains Malaysia	-	-	151-200	151-200	151-200	N/A	N/A	N/A

=== Times Higher Education Emerging Economies University Rankings ===
- Formerly known as Times Higher Education BRICS & Emerging Economies University Rankings

Emerging Economies University Ranking
Institution	2014	2015	2016	2017	2018	2019	2020	2021	2022
University of Malaya	-	-	-	-	27	18	22	31	36
Universiti Teknologi PETRONAS	-	-	-	91	77	60	78	62	60
Universiti Putra Malaysia	95	-	103	89	108	145	106	78	81
Universiti Kebangsaan Malaysia	77	-	158	136	151	132	133	112	91
Universiti Pendidikan Sultan Idris	-	-	-	-	-	-	-	-	101
Universiti Utara Malaysia	-	-	-	201-250	251-300	201-250	201-250	121	107
Universiti Sains Malaysia	-	-	112	114	135	105	122	120	113
Universiti Teknologi Malaysia	-	93	56	100	101	86	111	108	119
Universiti Tenaga Nasional	-	-	-	-	159	187	162	165	150
Universiti Malaysia Perlis	-	-	-	-	-	-	196	351-400	351-400
Universiti Malaysia Sarawak	-	-	-	-	-	351+	401-500	401-500	401-500
Multimedia University	-	-	-	-	-	-	401-500	401-500	401-500
Universiti Tunku Abdul Rahman	-	-	-	-	114	117	138	144	401-500
Universiti Tun Hussein Onn Malaysia	-	-	-	-	-	-	-	-	401-500
Universiti Kuala Lumpur	-	-	-	-	-	-	-	401-500	501+
Universiti Teknikal Malaysia Melaka	-	-	-	-	-	-	-	501+	501+
Universiti Teknologi MARA	-	-	-	251-300	-	351+	401-500	501+	501+
Universiti Malaysia Terengganu	-	-	-	-	-	-	-	-	501+
University of Cyberjaya	-	-	-	-	-	-	-	-	Reporter
Lincoln University College	-	-	-	-	-	-	-	-	Reporter
Universiti Malaysia Kelantan	-	-	-	-	-	-	-	-	Reporter
Management & Science University	-	-	-	-	-	-	-	-	Reporter

=== Times Higher Education Asia University Rankings ===
Asia Ranking
Institution	2013	2016	2017	2018	2019	2020	2021
University of Malaya	-	-	59	46	38	43	49
Universiti Teknologi Petronas	-	-	141-150	114	98	124	111
Universiti Tunku Abdul Rahman	-	-	111-120	99	111	119	119
Universiti Putra Malaysia	-	121-130	121-130	142	188	145	136
Universiti Kebangsaan Malaysia	87	161-170	161-170	175	170	160	150
Universiti Teknologi Malaysia	-	70	121-130	129	125	143	150
Universiti Utara Malaysia	-	-	251+	301-350	251-300	251-300	155
Universiti Sains Malaysia	-	141-150	151-160	162	150	156	163
Universiti Tenaga Nasional	-	-	-	171	201-250	201-250	201-250
Universiti Malaysia Perlis	-	-	-	-	-	165	351-400
Universiti Kuala Lumpur	-	-	-	-	-	-	401+
Universiti Malaysia Sarawak	-	-	-	-	351-400	401+	401+
Multimedia University	-	-	-	-		401+	401+
Universiti Teknikal Malaysia Melaka	-	-	-	-	-	-	401+
Universiti Teknologi MARA	-	-	251+	-	351-400	401+	401+

=== Times Higher Education Asia Pacific University Rankings ===
Asia Pacific Ranking
Institution	2017	2018	2019
University of Malaya	-	61	55
Universiti Teknologi Petronas	131-140	121-130	101-110
Universiti Tunku Abdul Rahman	-	111-120	111-120
Universiti Teknologi Malaysia	121-130	121-130	121-130
Universiti Sains Malaysia	141-150	151-160	141-150
Universiti Kebangsaan Malaysia	151-160	161-170	151-160
Universiti Putra Malaysia	121-130	131-140	171-180
Universiti Tenaga Nasional	-	161-170	191-200
Universiti Utara Malaysia	201+	251+	201-250
Universiti Teknologi MARA	-	-	301+
Universiti Malaysia Sarawak	-	-	301+

=== Times Higher Education Global University Employability Rankings ===
World Ranking
Institution	2017	2018	2019	2020	2021
Universiti Sains Malaysia	-	200-250	192	191	178
University of Malaya	147	149	206	226	217

=== Times Higher Education Impact Rankings ===
World Ranking
Institution	2019	2020	2021
Universiti Sains Malaysia	49	65	39
University of Malaya	101-200	80	101-200
Universiti Teknologi Malaysia	101-200	201-300	101-200
Universiti Teknologi MARA	-	401-600	101-200
Universiti Putra Malaysia	201-300	101-200	201-300
Universiti Tunku Abdul Rahman	101-200	201-300	201-300
Universiti Kebangsaan Malaysia	-	101-200	301-400
Universiti Malaysia Sarawak	201-300	201-300	301-400
Lincoln University College	301+	401-600	401-600
Sunway University	-	-	401-600
Universiti Malaysia Terengganu	-	-	401-600
University of Cyberjaya	-	601+	601-800
Management and Science University	301+	401-600	601-800
Multimedia University	-	-	601-800
Quest International University Perak	-	-	601-800
Universiti Malaysia Kelantan	-	-	801-1000
Universiti Teknikal Malaysia Melaka	-	-	801-1000
Universiti Tun Hussein Onn Malaysia	-	-	801-1000
Universiti Malaysia Perlis	-	601+	1001+
Universiti Tenaga Nasional	301+	401-600	-

=== Times Higher Education Most International Universities Ranking ===
World Ranking
Institution	2022
University of Malaya	65

=== QS World University Rankings ===
World Ranking
Institution	2008	2009	2010	2011	2012	2013	2014	2015	2016	2017	2018	2019	2020	2021	2022
University of Malaya	246	230	180	207	167	156	167	151	146	133	114	87	70	59	65
Universiti Putra Malaysia	-	-	345	319	358	360	411-420	376	331	270	229	202	159	132	143
Universiti Kebangsaan Malaysia	309	250	291	263	279	261	269	259	312	302	230	184	160	141	144
Universiti Sains Malaysia	307	313	314	309	335	326	355	309	289	330	264	207	165	142	147
Universiti Teknologi Malaysia	-	-	320	365	401	358	355	294	303	288	253	228	217	187	191
Taylor's University	-	-	-	-	-	-	-	-	-	-	-	601-650	511-520	379	332
UCSI University	-	-	-	-	-	-	-	-	-	-	-	481	442	391	347
Universiti Teknologi PETRONAS	-	-	-	-	-	-	-	-	-	601-650	601-650	521-530	482	439	414
Universiti Utara Malaysia	-	-	-	-	-	-	-	-	701+	701+	701-750	601-650	591-600	531-540	511-520
Management & Science University	-	-	-	-	-	-	-	-	-	-	-	-	541-550	551-560	601-650
International Islamic University Malaysia	-	-	-	-	451-500	401-450	501-550	501-550	551-600	601-650	701-750	651-700	651-700	601-650	651-700
Sunway University	-	-	-	-	-	-	-	-	-	-	-	-	751-800	701-750	651-700
Universiti Teknologi MARA	-	-	-	-	-	601+	701+	651-700	701+	701+	751-800	751-800	651-700	651-700	651-700
Universiti Tenaga Nasional	-	-	-	-	-	-	-	-	-	-	-	701-750	801-1000	701-750	751-800
Universiti Kuala Lumpur	-	-	-	-	-	-	-	-	-	-	-	-	-	-	801-1000
Universiti Malaysia Pahang	-	-	-	-	-	-	-	-	-	-	-	-	751-800	751-800	801-1000
Universiti Malaysia Perlis	-	-	-	-	-	-	-	-	-	-	-	-	701-750	801-1000	801-1000
Universiti Tunku Abdul Rahman	-	-	-	-	-	-	-	-	-	-	-	-	801-1000	801-1000	801-1000
Multimedia University	-	-	-	-	-	-	-	-	-	-	-	801-1000	801-1000	801-1000	1001-1200
Universiti Malaysia Sabah	-	-	-	-	-	-	-	-	-	-	-	-	801-1000	801-1000	1001-1200
Universiti Malaysia Sarawak	-	-	-	-	-	-	-	-	-	-	-	-	801-1000	801-1000	1001-1200
Universiti Malaysia Terengganu	-	-	-	-	-	-	-	-	-	-	-	-	-	-	1001-1200

=== QS World University Rankings by Faculty ===
World Ranking
	2015		2017		2018		2019		2020		2021	
Discipline	Rank	Institute	Rank	Institute	Rank	Institute	Rank	Institute	Rank	Institute	Rank	Institute
Arts & Humanities	127; 179; 191; 295; 342; 372	UM; UKM; USM; UPM; UiTM; UTM	85; 135; 144; 223; 249; 296; 401-450; 401-450; 401-450	UM; UKM; USM; UPM; UiTM; UTM; IIUM; UUM; UMS	65; 91; 113; 152; 239; 272; 391; 401-450; 451-500	UM; USM; UKM; UPM; UiTM; UTM; UUM; IIUM; UMS	99; 168; 212; 253; 383; 393; 451-500	UM; UKM; USM; UPM; UiTM; UTM; IIUM	105; 238; 250; 324; 401-450	UM; UKM; USM; UPM; UTM	105; 258; 304; 343; 401-450	UM; UKM; USM; UPM; IIUM
Engineering & Technology	54; 85; 100; 133; 149; 288; 345	UM; USM; UTM; UPM; UKM; UTP; UiTM	35; 90; 93; 135; 145; 233; 280; 371; 401-450; 401-450; 451-500; 451-500	UM; UTM; USM; UKM; UPM; UTP; UiTM; UNITEN; IIUM; MMU; UTHM; UniMAP	22; 53; 60; 86; 88; 145; 180; 255; 355; 371; 401-450; 401-450; 451-500	UM; UTM; USM; UPM; UKM; UTP; UiTM; UNITEN; MMU; IIUM; UTHM; UniMAP; UTAR	38; 85; 123; 135; 142; 221; 290; 398; 401-450; 401-450	UM; UTM; USM; UKM; UPM; UTP; UiTM; UNITEN; IIUM; UMP	55; 100; 179; 179; 210; 259; 386; 391	UM; UTM; UKM; USM; UPM; UTP; UMP; UiTM	54; 104; 194; 199; 224; 230; 358	UM; UTM; UKM; USM; UPM; UTP; UMP
Life Sciences & Medicine	249; 254; 311; 355	UM; USM; UPM; UKM	164; 269; 289; 295	UM; USM; UPM; UKM	154; 234; 249; 280; 451-500	UM; USM; UPM; UKM; UiTM	182; 326; 326; 360	UM; UPM; USM; UKM	174; 311; 355; 371	UM; UPM; USM; UKM	179; 314; 358; 363	UM; UPM; UKM; USM
Natural Sciences	217; 226; 256; 363	UM; USM; UPM; UKM	188; 232; 276; 369; 378	UM; USM; UPM; UKM; UTM	141; 197; 215; 311; 317	UM; USM; UPM; UTM; UKM	137; 223; 231; 289; 294	UM; USM; UPM; UTM; UKM	156; 281; 295; 302; 345	UM; UPM; USM; UTM; UKM	166; 244; 272; 327; 396	UM; UPM; UTM; USM; UKM
Social Sciences & Management	69; 89; 152; 161; 211; 327; 336; 394	UM; USM; UPM; UKM; UTM; UiTM; UUM; IIUM	71; 106; 146; 187; 204; 309; 315; 368; 451-500; 451-500	UM; USM; UKM; UPM; UTM; UiTM; UUM; IIUM; MMU; UMS	45; 63; 92; 99; 122; 198; 211; 323; 385; 401-450; 401-450; 451-500	UM; USM; UKM; UPM; UTM; UiTM; UUM; IIUM; Taylor's; MMU; UMS; UTAR	55; 134; 144; 166; 226; 324; 376; 395; 401-450	UM; UKM; USM; UPM; UTM; UiTM; IIUM; Taylor's; UUM	74; 199; 207; 214; 252; 317; 400; 401-450; 401-450	UM; UPM; UKM; USM; UTM; UiTM; Taylor's; IIUM; UUM	85; 225; 232; 243; 257; 267; 340; 340; 451-500	UM; USM; UPM; UKM; Taylor's; UTM; UiTM; UUM; IIUM

=== QS World University Rankings by Subjects ===
		2013		2014		2015		2016		2017		2018		2019		2020		2021	
Discipline	Subject	Rank	Institute	Rank	Institute	Rank	Institute	Rank	Institute	Rank	Institute	Rank	Institute	Rank	Institute	Rank	Institute	Rank	Institute
Arts & Humanities	Art & Design	-	-	-	-	-	-	-	-	101-150; 151-200; 151-200	USM; Taylor's; UiTM	51-100; 101-150	UM; USM	51-100	UM	101-150; 151-200	UM; USM	151-200; 151-200; 201-220	MSU; UM; USM
Arts & Humanities	Archaeology	-	-	-	-	-	-	-	-	-	-	-	-	101-150	USM	-	-	-	-
Arts & Humanities	Architecture / Built Environment	-	-	-	-	51-100; 51-100; 51-100	UM; USM; UTM	51-100; 51-100; 51-100; 51-100	UKM; UM; USM; UTM	51-100; 51-100; 51-100; 51-100; 101-150; 101-150	UKM; UM; USM; UTM; UPM; UiTM	51-100; 51-100; 51-100; 51-100; 101-150; 151-200	UKM; UM; USM; UTM; UPM; UiTM	51-100; 51-100; 101-150; 101-150; 151-200	USM; UTM; UKM; UM; UPM	51-100; 51-100; 51-100; 101-150; 151-200	UM; USM; UTM; UKM; UPM	51-100; 101-150; 101-150; 101-150; 151-200; 151-200	UTM; UKM; UM; USM; UPM; UiTM
Arts & Humanities	English Language & Literature	-	-	-	-	51-100; 101-150; 101-150; 151-200	UM; UKM; USM; UPM	51-100; 101-150; 151-200; 151-200	UM; UKM; UPM; USM	51-100; 51-100; 101-150; 101-150	UKM; UM; UPM; USM	51-100; 51-100; 101-150; 151-200	UKM; UM; UPM; USM	51-100; 101-150; 101-150; 151-200	UM; UKM; UPM; USM	51-100; 151-200; 151-200; 151-200	UM; UKM; UPM; USM	62; 151-200; 151-200; 151-200	UM; UKM; UPM; USM
Arts & Humanities	History	-	-	-	-	-	-	-	-	-	-	-	-	151-200	UM	151-200	UM	151-200	UM
Arts & Humanities	Linguistics	-	-	-	-	51-100; 51-100; 101-150	UKM; UM; USM	51-100; 101-150; 101-150; 151-200	UM; UKM; USM; UPM	51-100; 51-100; 101-150; 201-250; 251-300; 251-300	UKM; UM; USM; UPM; UTM; UMS	51-100; 101-150; 101-150; 201-250; 251-300	UM; UKM; USM; UPM; UMS	51-100; 201-250; 201-250; 251-300	UM; UKM; USM; UPM	101-150; 201-250; 251-300; 251-300	UM; UKM; UPM; USM	101-150; 151-200; 251-300	UM; UKM; USM
Arts & Humanities	Modern Languages	101-150; 151-200; 151-200; 151-200; 151-200; 151-200	USM; IIUM; UKM; UM; UPM; UTM	51-100; 151-200	UM; IIUM	101-150; 201-250; 251-300	UM; UPM; UKM	101-150; 251-300; 251-300	UM; UKM; USM	51-100; 101-150; 151-200; 151-200; 251-300	UM; UKM; UPM; USM; UTM	51-100; 151-200; 201-250; 201-250	UM; UKM; UPM; USM	101-150; 201-250; 251-300; 251-300	UM; UKM; UPM; USM	51-100; 201-250; 201-250; 251-300	UM; UKM; USM; UPM	85; 151-200; 201-250; 251-300	UM; UKM; UPM; USM
Arts & Humanities	Performing Arts	-	-	-	-	-	-	-	-	-	-	51-100; 51-100	UCSI; UM	51-100; 51-100	UCSI; UM	51-100	UCSI	45	UCSI
Arts & Humanities	Theology, Divinity & Religious Studies	-	-	-	-	-	-	-	-	46; 51-100; 51-100; 51-100	IIUM; UKM; UM; USM	31; 51-100; 51-100; 51-100	IIUM; UKM; UM; USM	51-100; 51-100	IIUM; UM	37; 51-100	IIUM; UM	33; 51-100	IIUM; UM
Engineering & Technology	Chemical Engineering	38; 51-100; 101-150; 101-150; 151-200	USM; UM; UKM; UTM; UPM	51-100; 51-100; 101-150; 151-200; 151-200; 151-200	UM; USM; UTM; UKM; UPM; UTP	51-100; 51-100; 51-100; 101-150; 101-150; 151-200	UM; USM; UTM; UKM; UPM; UTP	46; 51-100; 51-100; 51-100; 101-150; 101-150	USM; UKM; UM; UTM; UPM; UTP	38; 38; 51-100; 51-100; 51-100; 101-150; 151-200	UM; USM; UKM; UPM; UTM; UTP; UiTM	42; 51-100; 51-100; 51-100; 51-100; 101-150; 201-250	UM; UKM; UPM; USM; UTM; UTP; UiTM	51-100; 51-100; 101-150; 101-150; 151-200; 151-200; 251-300	UM; UTM; UKM; USM; UPM; UTP; UMP	51-100; 51-100; 101-150; 101-150; 151-200; 151-200; 151-200	UM; UTM; USM; UTP; UKM; UMP; UPM	69; 88; 101-150; 101-150; 151-200; 151-200; 201-250	UM; UTM; USM; UTP; UKM; UPM; UMP
Engineering & Technology	Civil & Structural Engineering	-	-	51-100; 101-150; 101-150; 101-150; 151-200	USM; UKM; UPM; UTM; UM	101-150; 101-150; 101-150; 151-200; 151-200	UM; USM; UTM; UKM; UPM	101-150; 101-150; 101-150; 151-200; 151-200	UM; USM; UTM; UKM; UPM	51-100; 51-100; 51-100; 101-150; 101-150	UM; USM; UTM; UKM; UPM	46; 51-100; 51-100; 51-100; 101-150	UM; UKM; USM; UTM; UPM	51-100; 51-100; 101-150; 151-200; 151-200	UM; UTM; USM; UKM; UPM	51-100; 51-100; 101-150; 151-200; 151-200; 151-200	UM; UTM; USM; UKM; UPM; UTP	51-100; 51-100; 151-200; 151-200; 151-200; 151-200	UM; UTM; UKM; UPM; USM; UTP
Engineering & Technology	Computer Science & Information Systems	-	-	51-100; 51-100; 151-200; 151-200; 151-200	UM; USM; MMU; UPM; UTM	101-150; 101-150; 151-200; 151-200; 201-250; 251-300; 301-400; 301-400	UM; USM; UPM; UTM; MMU; UKM; UiTM; UTP	51-100; 51-100; 151-200; 151-200; 201-250; 301-350; 301-350; 351-400; 401-500	UM; USM; UPM; UTM; UKM; MMU; UTP; UiTM; IIUM	51-100; 51-100; 51-100; 101-150; 101-150; 251-300; 251-300; 251-300; 401-450; 451-500; 451-500; 451-500	UM; USM; UTM; UKM; UPM; MMU; UiTM; UTP; IIUM; UNITEN; UTAR; UUM	51-100; 51-100; 101-150; 101-150; 151-200; 251-300; 301-350; 301-350; 401-450; 451-500	UM; USM; UPM; UTM; UKM; UTP; MMU; UiTM; IIUM; UUM	51-100; 201-250; 201-250; 201-250; 251-300; 351-400; 451-500; 451-500; 501-550; 551-600	UM; UPM; USM; UTM; UKM; UTP; MMU; UiTM; IIUM; UTAR	51-100; 151-200; 201-250; 251-300; 251-300; 351-400; 451-500; 451-500; 501-550	UM; UTM; USM; UKM; UPM; UTP; MMU; UiTM; IIUM	78; 201-250; 251-300; 301-350; 301-350; 401-450; 451-500; 501-550; 501-550; 601-650; 601-650	UM; UTM; USM; UKM; UPM; UTP; MMU; IIUM; UiTM; Taylor's; UUM
Engineering & Technology	Electrical & Electronic Engineering	-	-	51-100; 101-150; 101-150; 101-150; 101-150	UM UKM; UPM; USM; UTM	51-100; 51-100; 101-150; 101-150; 101-150; 151-200; 201-250; 251-300	UM; USM; UKM; UPM; UTM; MMU; UTP; UiTM	37; 51-100; 51-100; 101-150; 101-150; 151-200; 201-250; 251-300	UM; USM; UTM; UKM; UPM; MMU; UTP; UiTM	23; 51-100; 51-100; 51-100; 101-150; 151-200; 151-200; 201-250; 201-250; 301-350; 351-400; 351-400; 351-400	UM; UKM; USM; UTM; UPM; MMU; UTP; UiTM; UNITEN; UniMAP; IIUM; UTHM; UTAR	30; 51-100; 51-100; 101-150; 101-150; 201-250; 251-300; 251-300; 251-300	UM; USM; UTM; UKM; UPM; UTP; MMU; UiTM; UNITEN	47; 51-100; 101-150; 101-150; 151-200; 201-250; 251-300; 351-400; 351-400; 401-450; 451-500; 451-500	UM; UTM; UKM; USM; UPM; UTP; UNITEN; MMU; UiTM; UniMAP; IIUM; UTAR	46; 51-100; 101-150; 101-150; 151-200; 201-250; 301-350; 351-400; 351-400; 401-450; 451-500; 451-500	UM; UTM; UKM; USM; UPM; UTP; UNITEN; MMU; UiTM; UMP; UTAR; UniMAP	43; 72; 145; 151-200; 151-200; 201-250; 301-350; 351-400; 351-400; 351-400; 401-450; 451-500	UM; UTM; UKM; UPM; USM; UTP; UNITEN; MMU; UMP; UiTM; UniMAP; UTAR
Engineering & Technology	Mechanical, Aeronautical & Manufacturing Engineering	101-150; 101-150; 101-150; 101-150; 101-150	UKM; UM; UPM; USM; UTM	51-100; 51-100; 101-150; 101-150; 101-150	UM; USM; UKM; UPM; UTM	51-100; 51-100; 101-150; 101-150; 101-150; 201-300; 201-300; 201-300	UM; USM; UKM; UPM; UTM; UiTM; UTP; UTHM	51-100; 51-100; 101-150; 101-150; 101-150; 151-200; 201-300; 201-300	UM; USM; UKM; UPM; UTM; UTP; IIUM; UiTM	33; 51-100; 51-100; 51-100; 51-100; 151-200; 151-200; 201-250; 251-300; 251-300; 251-300; 351-400	UM; UKM; UPM; USM; UTM; UiTM; UTP; IIUM; UMP; UTHM; UniMAP; UNITEN	41; 51-100; 51-100; 101-150; 101-150; 151-200; 201-250; 251-300; 301-350; 351-400; 351-400	UM; USM; UTM; UKM; UPM; UTP; UiTM; IIUM; UTHM; UMP; UNITEN	51-100; 101-150; 151-200; 151-200; 151-200; 251-300; 301-350; 301-350; 351-400; 451-500; 451-500	UM; UTM; UKM; UPM; USM; UTP; UMP; UiTM; IIUM; UNITEN; UTHM	51-100; 101-150; 151-200; 151-200; 151-200; 251-300; 351-400; 351-400; 351-400; 451-500; 451-500	UM; UTM; UKM; UPM; USM; UTP; IIUM; UMP; UiTM; UNITEN; UTHM	107; 140; 201-250; 201-250; 201-250; 251-300; 351-400; 351-400; 351-400	UM; UTM; UKM; UPM; USM; UTP; IIUM; UMP; UiTM
Engineering & Technology	Mineral & Mining Engineering	-	-	-	-	-	-	-	-	35	USM	43; 47	USM; UM	-	-	42	UTP	47; 51-60	UTP; UTM
Engineering & Technology	Petroleum Engineering	-	-	-	-	-	-	-	-	-	-	-	-	-	-	21; 35; 51-75	UTP; UTM; UPM	23; 41; 51-100; 101-150; 101-150	UTP; UTM; UPM; UCSI; UiTM
Life Sciences & Medicine	Agriculture & Forestry	51-100	UPM	51-100	UPM	51-100	UPM	51-100; 151-200	UPM; UMS	51-100; 101-150; 151-200; 151-200; 151-200; 251-300	UPM; UTM; UMT; UiTM; UMS; IIUM	51-100; 151-200; 151-200; 251-300; 251-300	UPM; UTM; UMS; UMT; UiTM	51-100; 251-300	UPM; UTM	51-100; 251-300; 301-350; 351-400; 351-400	UPM; UTM; UMS; UMT; UiTM	80; 251-300; 301-350	UPM; UTM; UMS
Life Sciences & Medicine	Biological Sciences	-	-	-	-	251-300; 251-300; 301-400; 301-400	UM; USM; UKM; UPM	151-200; 201-250; 251-300; 301-400	USM; UM; UPM; UKM	151-200; 201-250; 251-300; 251-300; 351-400	UM; USM; UKM; UPM; UTM	201-250; 251-300; 251-300; 351-400; 401-450	UM; UPM; USM; UKM; UTM	151-200; 251-300; 251-300; 301-350; 401-450	UM; UPM; USM; UKM; UTM	151-200; 251-300; 301-350; 301-350; 401-450	UM; UPM; UKM; USM; UTM	151-200; 251-300; 301-350; 351-400; 351-400	UM; UPM; UKM; USM; UTM
Life Sciences & Medicine	Medicine	-	-	151-200	UM	151-200; 251-300; 251-300; 301-400	UM; UKM; USM; UPM	151-200; 201-250; 251-300; 301-400	UM; USM; UKM; UPM	101-150; 201-250; 201-250; 251-300; 351-400; 451-500	UM; UKM; USM; UPM; UiTM; IIUM	151-200; 201-250; 251-300; 301-350; 351-400; 451-500	UM; UKM; USM; UPM; UiTM; IIUM	101-150; 201-250; 251-300; 251-300; 401-450	UM; UKM; UPM; USM; UiTM	101-150; 251-300; 251-300; 251-300; 401-450; 551-600; 551-600; 551-600	UM; UKM; UPM; USM; UiTM; IIUM; IMU; UTM	145; 251-300; 301-350; 301-350; 401-450; 551-600; 601-650; 601-650	UM; UKM; UPM; USM; UiTM; IMU; IIUM; UTM
Life Sciences & Medicine	Nursing	-	-	-	-	-	-	-	-	-	-	-	-	-	-	-	-	101-150	UM
Life Sciences & Medicine	Pharmacy & Pharmacology	-	-	51-100; 101-150; 151-200; 151-200	USM; UM; UKM; UPM	101-150	USM	51-100; 101-150; 151-200; 151-200	USM; UM; UKM; UPM	51-100; 51-100; 101-150; 101-150; 151-200	UM; USM; UKM; UPM; UiTM	51-100; 101-150; 151-200; 151-200; 201-250	USM; UM; UKM; UPM; UiTM	101-150; 151-200; 201-250; 251-300	USM; UM; UKM; UPM	101-150; 101-150; 151-200; 151-200	UM; USM; UKM; UPM	75; 97; 101-150; 151-200; 251-300; 301-350; 301-350	USM; UM; UKM; UPM; UiTM; IMU; Taylor's
Life Sciences & Medicine	Psychology	-	-	-	-	-	-	-	-	251-300	UM	251-300	UM	-	-	251-300	UM	251-300	UM
Natural Sciences	Chemistry	-	-	101-150	USM	201-250; 201-250; 201-250; 301-400; 301-400	UM; UPM; USM; UKM; UTM	151-200; 151-200; 201-250; 251-300; 251-300	UM; USM; UPM; UKM; UTM	101-150; 151-200; 151-200; 201-250; 201-250; 451-500	UM; UPM; USM; UKM; UTM; UiTM	101-150; 151-200; 151-200; 201-250; 201-250; 401-450	UM; UPM; USM; UKM; UTM; UiTM	101-150; 151-200; 201-250; 251-300; 251-300; 451-500	UM; UPM; USM; UKM; UTM; UiTM	101-150; 201-250; 201-250; 201-250; 251-300; 451-500; 501-550; 501-550	UM; UPM; USM; UTM; UKM; UMP; UiTM; UTP	150; 201-250; 201-250; 201-250; 251-300; 501-550; 501-550; 601-620	UM; UPM; USM; UTM; UKM; UMP; UTP; UiTM
Natural Sciences	Environmental Sciences	30; 101-150; 151-200	USM; UPM; UM	28; 101-150; 151-200	USM; UPM; UM	31; 101-150; 151-200; 201-250; 251-300	USM; UM; UPM; UTM; UKM	51-100; 101-150; 151-200; 151-200; 251-300	USM; UM; UPM; UTM; UKM	49; 51-100; 101-150; 101-150; 151-200	USM; UM; UPM; UTM; UKM	51-100; 51-100; 101-150; 101-150; 151-200	UM; USM; UPM; UTM; UKM	101-150; 101-150; 151-200; 151-200; 201-250	UM; USM; UPM; UTM; UKM	101-150; 151-200; 151-200; 151-200; 201-250	UM; UPM; USM; UTM; UKM	89; 151-200; 151-200; 201-250; 201-250	UM; USM; UTM; UKM; UPM
Natural Sciences	Geography	151-200; 151-200	UKM; UM	151-200; 151-200	UKM; UM	151-200	UM	151-200	UM	151-200	UM	101-150; 151-200	UM; USM	51-100; 151-200; 151-200	UM; UKM; USM	51-100; 151-200; 151-200	UM; UKM; USM	51-100; 151-200; 151-200	UM; UKM; USM
Natural Sciences	Materials Sciences	151-200	USM	151-200; 151-200	UM; USM	151-200; 151-200; 151-200; 151-200	UM; UPM; USM; UTM	101-150; 151-200; 151-200; 151-200; 151-200	USM; UKM; UM; UPM; UTM	101-150; 101-150; 101-150; 151-200; 151-200	UM; USM; UTM; UKM; UPM	101-150; 101-150; 151-200; 201-250; 201-250	UM; USM; UTM; UKM; UPM	101-150; 151-200; 151-200; 201-250; 251-300; 301-350	UM; USM; UTM; UKM; UPM; UiTM	101-150; 151-200; 151-200; 201-250; 251-300; 351-400; 351-400	UM; USM; UTM; UKM; UPM; UMP; UiTM	101-150; 151-200; 201-250; 251-300; 251-300; 351-400	UM; UTM; USM; UKM; UPM; UMP
Natural Sciences	Mathematics	151-200	UKM	101-150	UKM	151-200; 251-300; 251-300; 301-400; 301-400	UKM; UPM; USM; UM; UTM	151-200; 201-250; 201-250; 251-300; 251-300	USM; UKM; UTM; UM; UPM	151-200; 151-200; 201-250; 201-250; 201-250	UM; USM; UKM; UPM; UTM	101-150; 151-200; 201-250; 201-250; 201-250	UM; USM; UKM; UPM; UTM	101-150; 151-200; 201-250; 201-250; 201-250	UM; USM; UKM; UPM; UTM	101-150; 201-250; 251-300; 251-300; 251-300	UM; UPM; UKM; USM; UTM	117; 201-250; 251-300; 251-300; 301-350	UM; UTM; UKM; USM; UPM
Natural Sciences	Physics & Astronomy	-	-	-	-	301-400; 301-400	UKM; UM	301-400; 301-400	UM; UTM	201-250; 301-350; 301-350; 351-400; 351-400	UM; USM; UTM; UKM; UPM	201-250; 301-350; 351-400; 351-400; 351-400	UM; UTM; UKM; UPM; USM	151-200; 351-400; 351-400; 351-400; 401-450	UM; UKM; UPM; UTM; USM	151-200; 301-350; 351-400; 351-400; 401-450	UM; UTM; UPM; UKM; USM	151-200; 301-350; 351-400; 351-400; 401-450; 551-600	UM; UTM; UKM; UPM; USM; UTP
Social Sciences	Accounting & Finance	-	-	-	-	101-150; 101-150; 101-150; 151-200	UKM; UM; UPM; UUM	101-150; 101-150; 151-200; 151-200; 151-200	UM; UPM; UKM; UiTM; UUM	101-150; 151-200; 151-200; 151-200; 151-200	UM; UKM; UPM; UiTM; UUM	101-150; 151-200; 151-200; 151-200	UM; UKM; UPM; UiTM	101-150; 151-200; 151-200; 251-300; 251-300; 251-300	UM; UKM; UPM; IIUM; UiTM; UUM	51-100; 151-200; 151-200; 201-250; 251-300; 251-300; 251-300	UM; UKM; UPM; UiTM; IIUM; UTM; UUM	79; 101-150; 151-200; 201-250; 201-250; 201-250; 251-300	UM; UPM; UKM; IIUM; UiTM; UUM; UTM
Social Sciences	Anthropology	-	-	-	-	-	-	-	-	51-100	UM	51-100	UM	-	-	-	-	-	-
Social Sciences	Business & Management Studies	-	-	-	-	101-150; 101-150; 151-200	UM; USM; UPM	101-150; 101-150; 151-200; 151-200	UM; USM; UKM; UPM	51-100; 101-150; 101-150; 151-200; 201-250; 251-300	UM; UKM; USM; UPM; UiTM; UUM	51-100; 101-150; 151-200; 151-200; 201-250; 251-300	UM; USM; UKM; UPM; UiTM; UUM	51-100; 151-200; 201-250; 201-250; 301-350; 301-350; 301-350; 401-450; 451-500	UM; UPM; UKM; USM; Taylor's; UiTM; UUM; MMU; UTAR	51-100; 151-200; 151-200; 201-250; 201-250; 251-300; 301-350; 351-400; 451-500; 451-500; 451-500; 451-500	UM; UPM; USM; Taylor's; UKM; UUM; UiTM; UCSI; MMU; Sunway; UMP; UTAR	76; 147; 151-200; 151-200; 201-250; 201-250; 251-300; 301-350; 401-450; 401-450; 451-500; 451-500; 501-550	UM; Taylor's; UPM; USM; UKM; UUM; UCSI; UiTM; Sunway; UTAR; MSU; UTP; MMU
Social Sciences	Communication & Media Studies	-	-	101-150; 151-200	USM; UPM	-	-	101-150; 151-200; 151-200	UM; UKM; USM	51-100; 101-150; 151-200	UM; UKM; USM	51-100; 101-150; 151-200	UM; UKM; USM	51-100; 151-200; 151-200	UM; UKM; USM	101-150; 151-200; 151-200	UM; UKM; USM	101-150; 101-150; 151-200	UKM; UM; USM
Social Sciences	Development Studies	-	-	-	-	32; 51-100; 51-100	UM; UKM; USM	30; 51-100	UM; USM	26; 51-100	UM; USM	30; 51-100	UM; USM	38	UM	49; 51-100	UM; USM	51-100	UM
Social Sciences	Economics & Econometrics	-	-	101-150; 151-200; 151-200; 151-200	UPM; UKM; UM; USM	151-200	UPM	151-200; 151-200; 151-200; 201-300	UM; UPM; USM; UKM	151-200; 151-200; 201-250; 251-300; 301-350	UM; USM; UKM; UPM; UUM	151-200; 201-250; 201-250; 251-300	UM; UKM; USM; UPM	101-150; 201-250; 201-250; 201-250; 351-400; 351-400; 351-400	UM; UKM; UPM; USM; IIUM; UiTM; UUM	101-150; 201-250; 201-250; 201-250; 351-400; 401-450; 451-500	UM; UKM; UPM; USM; UUM; UiTM; IIUM	119; 151-200; 151-200; 201-250; 301-350; 401-450; 401-450	UM; UPM; USM; UKM; UUM; IIUM; UiTM
Social Sciences	Education & Training	-	-	51-100; 51-100; 51-100; 101-150	UKM; UM; UPM; USM	101-150; 101-150; 151-200	UM; USM; UPM	51-100; 51-100; 51-100; 101-150; 201-300; 201-300; 201-300	UKM; UM; USM; UPM; IIUM; UTM; UiTM	41; 51-100; 51-100; 101-150; 151-200; 201-250; 251-300; 251-300	UM; UKM; USM; UPM; UTM; UiTM; IIUM; UPSI	51-100; 51-100; 51-100; 101-150; 151-200; 251-300; 251-300	UKM; UM; USM; UPM; UTM; IIUM; UiTM	51-100; 101-150; 151-200; 151-200; 201-250	UM; UKM; UPM; USM; UTM	51-100; 151-200; 151-200; 151-200; 251-300	UM; UKM; UPM; USM; UTM	62; 151-200; 151-200; 201-250; 201-250	UM; USM; UTM; UKM; UPM
Social Sciences	Hospitality & Leisure Management	-	-	-	-	-	-	-	-	29; 32	Taylor's; USM	21	Taylor's	14	Taylor's	16; 28; 31	Taylor's; MSU; UiTM	17; 51-100; 51-100; 51-100	Taylor's; MSU; UCSI; UiTM
Social Sciences	Law	-	-	101-150; 101-150	UKM; UM	151-200	UM	151-200	UM	151-200; 201-250	UM; UKM	101-150; 201-250	UM; UKM	101-150; 201-250	UM; UKM	51-100; 201-250; 251-300	UM; UKM; IIUM	101-150; 251-300; 251-300	UM; IIUM; UKM
Social Sciences	Library & Information Management	-	-	-	-	-	-	-	-	-	-	24	UM	31	UM	38	UM	32	UM
Social Sciences	Politics	101-150	UKM	51-100	UKM	-	-	-	-	-	-	151-200	UKM	101-150	UM	101-150	UM	101-150	UM
Social Sciences	Social Policy & Administration	-	-	-	-	-	-	51-100	UKM	51-100; 51-100	UKM; UM	51-100	UKM	-	-	-	-	101-120	UM
Social Sciences	Sociology	-	-	-	-	151-200	UM	-	-	151-200; 151-200; 201-250; 251-300	UM; USM; UKM; UPM	151-200; 201-250; 201-250; 251-300	UM; UKM; USM; UPM	151-200; 151-200; 201-250	UKM; UM; USM	101-150; 151-200; 201-250	UM; UKM; USM	151-200; 201-250; 251-300	UM; UKM; USM
Social Sciences	Sports-Related; Subjects	-	-	-	-	-	-	-	-	51-100	UM	51-100	UM	51-100	UM	51-100	UM	101-120	UM
Social Sciences	Statistics & Operational Research	-	-	-	-	-	-	151-200; 151-200	UM; USM	101-150; 151-200; 151-200	UM; UKM; USM	101-150; 151-200; 151-200	UM; UKM; USM	151-200; 151-200	UM; USM	151-200; 151-200	UM; USM	151-200; 151-200	UM; USM

=== QS Top 50 Under 50 Rankings ===
Top 50 Under 50 Ranking
Institution	2013	2014	2015	2016	2018	2019	2020	2021
Universiti Putra Malaysia	-	-	38	17	15	13	12	10
Universiti Teknologi Malaysia	-	-	30	25	21	18	17	13
Taylor's University	-	-	-	-	-	91-100	81-90	49
UCSI University	-	-	-	-	-	61-70	61-70	51-60
Universiti Teknologi PETRONAS	-	-	-	91-100	91-100	71-80	71-80	61-70
Universiti Utara Malaysia	-	-	-	-	101-150	101-150	101-150	81-90
Management & Science University	-	-	-	-	-	-	91-100	81-90
International Islamic University Malaysia	-	-	91-100	91-100	101-150	101-150	101-150	91-100
Universiti Tenaga Nasional	-	-	-	-	-	101-150	-	101-150
Sunway University	-	-	-	-	-	-	101-150	101-150
Universiti Malaysia Pahang	-	-	-	-	-	-	101-150	101-150
Universiti Malaysia Perlis	-	-	-	-	-	-	101-150	-
Universiti Sains Malaysia	-	-	26	33	23	14	N/A	N/A
Universiti Kebangsaan Malaysia	19	20	32	26	16	12	13	N/A

=== QS Asian University Rankings ===
Top 600 Asia Ranking
Institution	2012	2013	2014	2015	2016	2018	2019	2020	2021	2022
University of Malaya	35	33	32	29	27	24	19	13	9	8
Universiti Putra Malaysia	76	72	76	66	49	36	34	33	28	27
Universiti Kebangsaan Malaysia	58	57	56	56	55	43	41	39	35	33
Universiti Sains Malaysia	63	61	57	49	51	46	43	37	34	35
Universiti Teknologi Malaysia	74	68	66	61	63	49	47	46	39	38
Taylor's University	-	-	-	201-250	179	150	135	109	89	53
Universiti Teknologi PETRONAS	201-250	201-250	191-200	151-160	127	101	99	82	70	72
UCSI University	-	-	-	251-300	-	212	178	122	105	77
Universiti Utara Malaysia	251-300	201-250	201-250	191-200	137	131	128	116	107	98
Universiti Teknologi MARA	201-250	201-250	201-250	201-250	181	158	137	119	108	105
Sunway University	-	-	-	-	-	261-270	232	194	172	121
International Islamic University Malaysia	151-160	151-160	145	151-160	151	163	143	140	123	123
Universiti Malaysia Pahang	-	251-300	251-300	251-300	251-300	281-290	188	134	133	129
Universiti Tenaga Nasional	251-300	201-250	251-300	251-300	251-300	243	234	195	168	144
Management and Science University	-	-	-	-	-	217	271-280	179	139	147
Universiti Malaysia Terengganu	-	251-300	251-300	251-300	251-300	271-280	291-300	243	195	167
Universiti Tunku Abdul Rahman	251-300	251-300	-	251-300	251-300	251-260	188	181	157	167
Multimedia University	191-200	201-250	201-250	201-250	193	179	175	170	190	189
Universiti Pendidikan Sultan Idris	-	-	-	-	-	351-400	401-450	351-400	281-290	205
Universiti Malaysia Sabah	-	-	201-250	201-250	211-220	222	206	211	210	227
Universiti Malaysia Sarawak	161-170	181-190	201-250	201-250	251-300	247	236	243	251-260	227
Universiti Tun Hussein Onn Malaysia	251-300	251-300	251-300	251-300	301-350	301-350	301-350	301-350	291-300	247
Universiti Malaysia Perlis	-	201-250	201-250	201-250	221-230	221	201	211	207	251-260
Asia Pacific University	-	-	-	-	-	-	-	-	301-350	271-280
SEGi University	-	-	-	-	-	-	-	301-350	301-350	291-300
Lincoln University College	-	-	-	-	-	-	-	-	351-400	301-350
Universiti Kuala Lumpur	-	-	-	-	-	351-400	351-400	301-350	291-300	301-350
AIMST University	-	-	-	-	-	-	-	-	-	351-400
HELP University	-	-	-	-	-	-	-	-	401-450	351-400
INTI International University	-	-	-	-	-	-	-	-	401-450	351-400
Limkokwing University of Creative Technology	251-300	251-300	251-300	251-300	251-300	219	351-400	401-450	351-400	401-450
Universiti Teknikal Malaysia Melaka	-	-	-	-	-	-	-	451-500	401-450	401-450
Malaysia University of Science & Technology	-	-	-	-	-	-	-	-	451-500	501-550
Universiti Sains Islam Malaysia	-	-	-	-	-	-	-	501-550	501-550	501-550
Universiti Sultan Zainal Abidin	-	-	-	-	-	351-400	451-500	451-500	451-500	501-550
Universiti Malaysia Kelantan	-	-	-	-	-	-	-	-	551-600	551-600
Al-Madinah International University	-	-	-	-	-	351-400	-	-	-	-

=== QS Graduate Employability Rankings ===
World Ranking
Institution	2017	2018	2019	2020	2022
University of Malaya	151-200	201-250	161-170	141-150	131-140
Taylor's University	-	-	201-250	201-250	191-200
UCSI University	-	-	301-500	251-300	201-250
Universiti Tunku Abdul Rahman	-	-	-	251-300	201-250
Management & Science University	-	-	-	301-500	301-500
Universiti Kebangsaan Malaysia	-	301-500	301-500	301-500	301-500
Universiti Malaysia Pahang	-	-	-	301-500	301-500
Universiti Putra Malaysia	-	-	-	-	301-500
Universiti Sains Malaysia	201+	-	301-500	301-500	301-500
Universiti Teknologi MARA	-	301-500	301-500	301-500	301-500
Universiti Teknologi Malaysia	-	-	-	-	301-500
Universiti Tenaga Nasional	-	-	-	-	501+
International Islamic University Malaysia	-	-	301-500	-	-

=== Reuters Top 75: Asia's Most Innovative Universities Rankings ===
Asia Ranking
Institution	2016
Universiti Putra Malaysia	73
University of Malaya	75

=== Academic Ranking of World Universities (ARWU) ===
World Ranking
Institution	2011	2012	2013	2014	2015	2016	2017	2018	2019	2020	2021
University of Malaya	401-500	401-500	401-500	301-400	301-400	401-500	401-500	301-400	301-400	301-400	301-400
Universiti Kebangsaan Malaysia	-	-	-	-	-	-	501-600	501-600	501-600	501-600	501-600
Universiti Teknologi Malaysia	-	-	-	-	-	-	701-800	801-900	501-600	601-700	701-800
Universiti Sains Malaysia	-	-	-	401-500	401-500	401-500	401-500	401-500	501-600	501-600	701-800
Universiti Putra Malaysia	-	-	-	-	-	-	501-600	601-700	701-800	701-800	701-800

=== Academic Ranking of World Universities (ARWU) by Fields ===
World Ranking
	2014		2015		2016	
Field	Rank	Institute	Rank	Institute	Rank	Institute
Engineering	101-150	USM	101-150	USM	101-150; 101-150	USM; UKM

=== Academic Ranking of World Universities (ARWU) by Special Focus Institution ===
World Ranking
	2018	
Departments	Rank	Institute
Sport Science Schools and Departments	201-300	UM Sports Centre

=== Academic Ranking of World Universities (ARWU) Global Ranking of Academic Subjects ===
- Formerly known as Academic Ranking of World Universities (ARWU) by Subjects

World Ranking
		2014		2015		2017		2018		2019		2020	
Discipline	Subject	Rank	Institute	Rank	Institute	Rank	Institute	Rank	Institute	Rank	Institute	Rank	Institute
Engineering	Automatic & Control	-	-	-	-	-	-	151-200	UM	151-200	UM	-	-
Engineering	Biomedical Engineering	-	-	-	-	201-300	UM	151-200	UM	151-200	UM	201-300	UM
Engineering	Biotechnology	-	-	-	-	201-300; 201-300; 201-300	UM; USM; UPM	201-300; 201-300; 201-300; 301-400; 401-500	UTM; USM; UM; UKM; UPM	201-300; 201-300; 301-400; 301-400; 401-500	UM; UPM; UTM; USM; UKM	301-400; 201-300; 301-400; 301-400; 401-500	UM; UKM; UTM; USM; UPM
Engineering	Chemical Engineering	-	-	-	-	51-75; 76-100; 101-150; 151-200; 201-300	UTM; UM; UNMC; USM; UPM	51-75; 51-75; 151-200; 201-300; 201-300; 301-400; 301-400	UTM; UM; USM; UNMC; UPM; UKM; UMP	76-100; 76-100; 201-300; 201-300; 301-400; 301-400; 401-500	UM; UTM; UNMC; USM; UKM; UPM; UMP	101-150; 151-200; 301-400; 301-400; 301-400; 301-400; 401-500	UTM; UM; UKM; UNMC; USM; UPM; UMP
Engineering	Civil Engineering	-	-	-	-	101-150; 201-300	UM; UKM	101-150; 201-300; 201-300; 201-300; 201-300	UM; UKM; UTM; USM; UPM	101-150; 201-300; 201-300; 201-300	UM; UKM; UTM; UPM	101-150; 201-300; 201-300	UM; UKM; UTM
Engineering	Computer Science & Engineering	-	-	-	-	51-75; 301-400; 301-400; 401-500	UM; UTM; USM; UPM	201-300; 201-300	UTM; UM	151-200; 201-300	UM; UTM	201-300; 301-400	UM; UTM
Engineering	Electrical & Electronic Engineering	-	-	-	-	201-300; 401-500	UM; UTM	151-200; 301-400; 401-500; 401-500; 401-500; 401-500	UM; UTM; UKM; UniMAP; USM; UPM	151-200; 301-400	UM; UTM	151-200; 401-500	UM; UTM
Engineering	Energy Science & Engineering	-	-	-	-	201-300; 201-300	UTM; UM	101-150; 201-300; 201-300; 301-400; 301-400; 301-400	UM; UMP; UTM; UKM; USM; UPM	151-200; 201-300; 301-400; 301-400; 301-400; 401-500	UM; UTM; UKM; UMP; UPM; USM	101-150; 201-300; 201-300; 301-400; 301-400; 301-400	UM; UMP; UTM; UKM; USM; UPM
Engineering	Environmental Science & Engineering	-	-	-	-	301-400; 301-400; 401-500	UTM; UM; USM	301-400; 301-400; 401-500; 401-500; 401-500	UTM; UM; UKM; USM; UPM	301-400; 401-500; 401-500	UM; UTM; UPM	-	-
Engineering	Food Science & Technology	-	-	-	-	25; 101-150; 151-200	UPM; USM; UM	27; 151-200; 151-200	UPM; UM; USM	31; 151-200; 151-200	UPM; UM; USM	51-75; 201-300	UPM; UM
Engineering	Instruments Science & Technology	-	-	-	-	20; 101-150	UM; UTM	16; 101-150	UM; UTM	27; 201-300	UM; UTM	23; 151-200; 201-300	UM; UTM; UKM
Engineering	Material Science & Engineering	-	-	-	-	301-400; 301-400; 401-500; 401-500; 401-500	UM; USM; UKM; UTM; UPM	301-400; 301-400; 401-500; 401-500	UM; USM; UTM; UPM	401-500	UM	-	-
Engineering	Mechanical Engineering	-	-	-	-	76-100; 151-200; 151-200; 201-300; 201-300	UM; UKM; UTM; USM; UPM	76-100; 151-200; 201-300; 201-300	UM; UTM; UKM; USM	101-150; 151-200; 201-300; 301-400; 301-400	UM; UTM; UKM; UMP; USM	101-150; 101-150; 201-300; 301-400	UTM; UM; UMP; UKM
Engineering	Metallurgical Engineering	-	-	-	-	101-150; 101-150	UM; USM	151-200	UTM	101-150; 151-200	UM; UTM	151-200	UTM
Engineering	Nanoscience & Nanotechnology	-	-	-	-	-	-	301-400; 301-400; 301-400; 301-400	UTM; UM; USM; UPM	-	-	-	-
Engineering	Telecommunication Engineering	-	-	-	-	-	-	151-200	UM	151-200; 201-300; 201-300; 201-300	UM; UKM; UTM; UPM	151-200; 201-300	UM; UTM
Engineering	Water Resources	-	-	-	-	51-75; 101-150; 151-200	UTM; UPM; USM	101-150; 151-200; 151-200	UPM; UTM; USM	101-150; 151-200	UPM; UTM	151-200	UPM
Life; Sciences	Agricultural Sciences	-	-	-	-	151-200; 201-300	UPM; UM	101-150; 201-300	UPM; UM	151-200; 301-400	UPM; UM	201-300; 401-500	UPM; UM
Life; Sciences	Biological Sciences	-	-	-	-	301-400	UM	401-500	UM	401-500	UM	-	-
Life; Sciences	Human Biological Sciences	-	-	-	-	401-500	UM	401-500	UM	401-500	UM	-	-
Life; Sciences	Veterinary Sciences	-	-	-	-	101-150; 151-200	UPM; UM	101-150; 201-300	UPM; UM	151-200; 201-300	UPM; UM	201-300; 201-300	UM; UPM
Medical; Sciences	Clinical Medicine	-	-	-	-	401-500	UM	401-500	UM	201-300; 301-400; 401-500	UKM; USM; UM	151-200; 301-400; 301-400	USM; UKM; UM
Medical; Sciences	Dentistry & Oral Sciences	-	-	-	-	-	-	201-300	UM	201-300	UM	201-300	UM
Medical; Sciences	Medical Technology	-	-	-	-	-	-	201-300	UM	301-400	UM	301-400	UM
Medical; Sciences	Pharmacy & Pharmaceutical Sciences	-	-	-	-	201-300; 301-400; 301-400	UM; USM; UPM	201-300; 301-400; 301-400	UM; USM; UPM	201-300; 301-400; 401-500	UM; USM; UPM	301-400	UM
Medical; Sciences	Public Health	-	-	-	-	301-400; 301-400; 401-500	UKM; UM; USM	151-200; 301-400; 401-500; 401-500	UKM; UM; USM; UPM	151-200; 301-400; 401-500	UKM; UM; USM	151-200; 301-400; 301-400	UKM; UM; USM
Natural; Sciences	Atmospheric Science	-	-	-	-	-	-	301-400; 301-400; 301-400	UKM; UTM; UPM	201-300; 301-400; 301-400	UPM; UKM; UTM	301-400; 301-400	UKM; UPM
Natural; Sciences	Chemistry	-	-	-	-	301-400; 401-500	UM; USM	301-400	UM	401-500	UM	-	-
Natural; Sciences	Earth Sciences	-	-	-	-	-	-	301-400	UPM	301-400	UPM	301-400	UPM
Natural; Sciences	Mathematics	151-200	UKM	151-200	UPM	401-500	USM	-	-	-	-	-	-
Natural; Sciences	Physics	-	-	-	-	401-500	UM	401-500	UM	301-400	UM	301-400; 401-500	UM; IIUM
Social; Sciences	Business Administration	-	-	-	-	-	-	301-400	UM	301-400	UM	-	-
Social; Sciences	Economics	-	-	-	-	-	-	301-400	UM	301-400	UM	401-500	UM
Social; Sciences	Education	-	-	-	-	101-150	UM	101-150; 401-500; 401-500	UM; UKM; USM	201-300; 301-400	UM; USM	301-400; 401-500	UM; USM
Social; Sciences	Hospitality & Tourism Management	-	-	-	-	-	-	101-150; 101-150	UM; USM	51-75; 101-150; 151-200	USM; UM; Taylor's	51-75; 76-100; 101-150; 151-200	USM; UM; UTM; Taylor's
Social; Sciences	Library & Information Science	-	-	-	-	49	UM	51-75	UM	51-75	UM	76-100	UM
Social; Sciences	Management	-	-	-	-	-	-	301-400; 401-500	UM; USM	301-400; 301-400	UM; USM	201-300; 401-500	UM; USM
Social; Sciences	Political Sciences	-	-	-	-	-	-	301-400; 301-400	UKM; UM	301-400	UM	301-400	UM

=== Nature Index ===
National Ranking
	2022		
Institution	Rank	Count	Share
University of Malaya	1	77	1.82
Universiti Sains Malaysia	2	6	0.76
Universiti Tunku Abdul Rahman	3	3	0.58
IDIR Solutions	4	1	0.57
Universiti Malaysia Terengganu	5	4	0.54
Universiti Malaysia Sabah	6	4	0.41
Universiti Malaysia Sarawak	7	2	0.41
Xiamen University Malaysia	8	3	0.36
UCSI University	9	2	0.31
National University of Malaysia	10	5	0.24

=== Centre For World Universities Rankings (CWUR) ===
World Ranking
Institution	2014	2015	2016	2017	2018	2019	2020	2021
University of Malaya	492	498	539	523	451	442	409	397
Universiti Sains Malaysia	315	482	694	701	566	688	754	778
Universiti Putra Malaysia	778	610	832	787	742	798	802	805
Universiti Kebangsaan Malaysia	-	-	-	-	826	796	886	884
Universiti Teknologi Malaysia	-	-	-	-	915	949	936	901
International Islamic University Malaysia	-	-	-	-	-	1604	1549	1527
Universiti Teknologi MARA	-	-	-	-	-	1503	1593	1566
Universiti Teknologi Petronas	-	-	-	-	-	1822	1877	1824

=== NTU Ranking ===
- Also known as Performance Ranking of Scientific Papers For World Universities

World Ranking
Institution	2014	2015	2016	2017	2018	2019	2020	2021
University of Malaya	470	378	323	354	305	305	328	334
Universiti Putra Malaysia	-	-	-	701-800	651-700	601-650	651-700	501-550
Universiti Teknologi Malaysia	-	-	-	-	701-750	701-750	601-650	551-600
Universiti Kebangsaan Malaysia	-	-	-	701-800	751-800	651-700	601-650	601-650
Universiti Sains Malaysia	-	-	-	601-700	601-650	601-650	651-700	601-650

=== US News Best Global Universities Ranking ===
World Ranking
Institution	2016	2017	2018	2019	2020	2021	2024
University of Malaya	422	356	301	266	232	205	281
Universiti Teknologi Malaysia	646	639	562	526	516	486	344
Universiti Sains Malaysia	557	576	579	567	584	580	401
Universiti Kebangsaan Malaysia	733	783	696	680	638	653	540
Universiti Putra Malaysia	638	670	638	618	611	626	544
Taylor's University	-	-	-	-	-	-	556
Universiti Teknologi Petronas	-	-	-	-	1078	1106	784
Sunway University	-	-	-	-	-	-	856
Universiti Malaysia Terengganu	-	-	-	-	-	-	880
UCSI University	-	-	-	-	-	-	951
Universiti Malaysia Pahang Al-Sultan Abdullah	-	-	-	-	-	1049	1089
Universiti Teknologi MARA	-	-	1084	1017	948	949	1141
International Medical University	-	-	-	-	-	-	1259
International Islamic University Malaysia	-	-	-	-	889	895	1272
Universiti Tunku Abdul Rahman	-	-	-	-	-	-	1281
Tun Hussein Onn University of Malaysia	-	-	-	-	-	-	1472
Universiti Malaysia Sabah	-	-	-	-	-	-	1693
Universiti Malaysia Perlis	-	-	-	-	1486	-	2065
Multimedia University	-	-	-	-	-	-	Unranked
Universiti Tenaga Nasional	-	-	-	-	-	-	Unranked
Universiti Teknikal Malaysia Melaka	-	-	-	-	-	-	Unranked

=== US News Best Global Universities Rankings By Subjects ===
World Ranking
	2015		2016		2017		2019		2020	
Discipline	Rank	Institute	Rank	Institute	Rank	Institute	Rank	Institute	Rank	Institute
Agricultural Sciences	45	UPM	42; 125; 175	UPM; USM; UM	53; 126; 136	UPM; USM; UM	53; 106; 132	UPM; UM; USM	42; 125; 144; 197	UPM; UM; USM; UKM
Arts and Humanities	-	-	-	-	-	-	-	-	237	UM
Biology and Biochemistry	-	-	-	-	-	-	387; 394	UM; UPM	304; 350; 442; 451	UM; UPM; USM; UKM
Chemistry	228	UM	187; 250; 316; 381	UM; USM; UTM; UPM	185; 259; 299; 380; 507	UM; USM; UTM; UPM; UKM	146; 259; 288; 349; 449	UM; UTM; USM; UPM; UKM	122; 238; 276; 345; 417; 619; 622; 741	UM; UTM; USM; UPM; UKM; UiTM; UTP; UMP
Civil Engineering	-	-	-	-	-	-	-	-	41; 86	UM; UTM
Clinical Medicine	-	-	324	UM	320; 553	UM; UKM	290; 513; 563	UM; UKM; USM	283; 383; 395	UM; UKM; USM
Computer Science	-	-	132	UM	88; 198	UM; UTM	55; 149	UM; UTM	37; 127	UM; UTM
Economics and Business	-	-	-	-	-	-	-	-	231	UM
Electrical and Electronic Engineering	-	-	-	-	-	-	-	-	143; 218	UM; UTM
Engineering	57; 95; 130; 207; 245	UM; USM; UTM; UKM; UPM	27; 85; 99; 209; 227	UM; UTM; USM; UKM; UPM	10; 50; 123; 168; 202; 435	UM; UTM; USM; UKM; UPM; UTP	13; 50; 156; 169; 232; 370; 391	UM; UTM; USM; UKM; UPM; UMP; UTP	15; 40; 147; 193; 220; 253; 271; 285; 464; 654	UM; UTM; UKM; USM; UPM; UNITEN; UMP; UTP; UiTM; UniMAP
Environment/Ecology	-	-	-	-	-	-	335; 350; 365	UPM; UM; UTM	332; 340; 377	UM; UPM; UTM
Immunology	-	-	-	-	-	-	-	-	196	UM
Materials Science	186; 209	USM; UM	160; 177; 258; 276; 304	UM; USM; UTM; UPM; UKM	133; 164; 233; 269; 270	UM; USM; UTM; UPM; UKM	134; 166; 243; 257; 265	UM; USM; UPM; UTM; UKM	149; 225; 273; 290; 306	UM; USM; UPM; UTM; UKM
Mechanical Engineering	-	-	-	-	-	-	-	-	50; 62	UM; UTM
Microbiology	-	-	163	UM	-	-	123	UM	118	UM
Molecular Biology and Genetics	-	-	-	-	-	-	248	UM	243	UM
Pharmacology and Toxicology	-	-	182	UM	148	UM	134; 189	UM; USM	114; 180; 216	UM; USM; UPM
Physics	-	-	389	UM	299	UM	233	UM	184; 525; 712	UM; IIUM; UPM
Plant and Animal Science	-	-	225; 319; 365	UM; UPM; USM	180; 263; 356	UM; UPM; USM	181; 233; 374	UM; UPM; USM	205; 234; 375	UM; UPM; USM
Social Sciences and Public Health	-	-	269; 393	UM; USM	227; 348	UM; USM	222; 377	UM; USM	207; 350	UM; USM

=== RankPro Worldwide Professional University Rankings ===
World Ranking
Institution	2015	2016	2017	2018	2019	2020
Universiti Putra Malaysia	-	64	987	98	Top 400	144
Universiti Teknologi Malaysia	-	20	557	138	Top 400	150
University of Malaya	47	27	297	86	Top 250	170
Universiti Sains Malaysia	-	-	600+	-	Top 450	483
Universiti Kebangsaan Malaysia	-	161	600+	126	Top 500	499
UCSI University	-	-	-	-	Top 900	886
Universiti Tunku Abdul Rahman	-	-	-	-	Top 900	888
Universiti Teknologi Petronas	-	-	-	-	Top 700	892
Taylor's University	-	-	-	-	Top 1000	896
Universiti Utara Malaysia	-	-	-	-	Top 1000	924
International Islamic University Malaysia	-	-	600+	-	Top 900	934

=== UI GreenMetric World University Ranking ===
World Ranking
Institution	2014	2015	2016	2017	2018	2019	2020	2021
Universiti Putra Malaysia	42	17	34	27	32	28	28	27
University of Malaya	73	65	68	34	36	34	32	32
Universiti Malaysia Sabah	245	173	44	37	71	58	67	67
Universiti Tunku Abdul Rahman	94	106	274	116	146	102	106	84
Universiti Utara Malaysia	-	44	54	83	76	64	77	109
Universiti Teknikal Malaysia Melaka	-	-	269	170	148	114	109	110
Universiti Malaysia Pahang	-	-	58	107	97	76	90	128
Universiti Teknologi Malaysia	87	118	85	66	70	82	94	149
Universiti Teknologi MARA	-	-	-	-	-	183	184	150
Universiti Tun Hussein Onn Malaysia	-	-	-	477	479	471	238	165
Universiti Sains Malaysia	-	-	-	260	225	145	-	168
Universiti Pendidikan Sultan Idris	-	-	-	-	687	696	203	176
Universiti Malaysia Terengganu	-	-	-	431	370	403	338	204
Politeknik Merlimau	-	-	-	-	-	-	254	246
Sunway University	-	-	-	-	-	-	473	280
Universiti Malaysia Perlis	-	-	-	521	338	377	363	303
University of Technology Sarawak	-	-	-	-	-	-	373	396
University of Selangor	-	-	-	-	-	-	486	424
Universiti Malaysia Kelantan	-	-	-	-	-	-	-	470
Universiti Sultan Zainal Abidin	-	-	-	-	-	-	-	487
Universiti Kebangsaan Malaysia	120	110	160	207	198	281	407	516
Politeknik Mersing	-	-	-	-	-	-	573	528
Universiti Sains Islam Malaysia	-	-	-	521	-	650	616	582
Politeknik Sultan Idris Shah	-	-	-	-	-	-	648	644
Politeknik Kuching Sarawak	-	-	-	-	-	-	-	721
Politeknik Sultan Haji Ahmad Shah	-	-	-	-	-	-	677	839
Politeknik Nilai	-	-	-	-	-	-	-	886
Politeknik Banting	-	-	-	-	-	-	-	888
University College of Agroscience Malaysia	-	-	-	-	-	330	479	-
International Islamic University Malaysia	236	361	443	546	-	472	-	-

=== Wikipedia Ranking of World Universities (WPRWU) ===
World Ranking
Institution	2015	2017
Universiti Teknologi Malaysia	204	197
University of Malaya	172	203
Universiti Teknologi MARA	250	230
Universiti Kebangsaan Malaysia	222	235
Universiti Sains Malaysia	252	263
Universiti Putra Malaysia	275	283
Universiti Malaysia Perlis	487	336
Universiti Utara Malaysia	323	344
Universiti Malaysia Terengganu	-	348
Universiti Kuala Lumpur	379	364
Universiti Malaysia Sabah	352	381
Universiti Malaysia Sarawak	346	404
Universiti Sultan Zainal Abidin	495	435
Universiti Tunku Abdul Rahman	556	473
Universiti Tun Abdul Razak	-	511
International Medical University	516	538
Universiti Tun Hussein Onn	617	573
UCSI University	658	585
University of Selangor	503	597
INTI International University	-	623
Universiti Teknologi PETRONAS	597	637
Tunku Abdul Rahman University College	-	645
Universiti Tenaga Nasional	-	688
Universiti Malaysia Kelantan	425	725
Limkokwing University of Creative Technology	-	731
Universiti Teknikal Malaysia Melaka	-	754
Twintech International University College of Technology	-	784
Universiti Malaysia Pahang	681	810
Sunway University	-	905
Universiti Sultan Azlan Shah	-	966
University of Nottingham Malaysia	830	1009

=== CWTS Leiden Ranking ===
Ranking For Malaysia Region
Institution	2013	2014	2015	2016	2017	2018	2019	2020	2021
University of Malaya	2	4	3	1	1	1	1	1	1
Universiti Putra Malaysia	-	3	4	3	2	2	2	2	2
Universiti Sains Malaysia	1	1	2	2	3	3	4	4	3
Universiti Teknologi Malaysia	-	-	1	5	4	4	3	3	4
Universiti Kebangsaan Malaysia	-	2	5	4	5	5	5	5	5
Universiti Teknologi Petronas	-	-	-	-	-	-	-	6	6

=== University Ranking By Academic Performance (URAP) ===
Ranking For Malaysia Region
Institution	2010	2011	2012	2013	2014	2015	2016	2017	2018	2019
University of Malaya	1	1	1	1	1	1	1	1	1	1
Universiti Teknologi Malaysia	5	5	5	5	5	4	4	3	3	2
Universiti Putra Malaysia	4	3	3	3	3	2	2	2	2	3
Universiti Sains Malaysia	2	2	2	2	2	3	3	4	4	4
Universiti Kebangsaan Malaysia	3	4	4	4	4	5	5	5	5	5
Universiti Teknologi MARA	7	7	6	6	6	6	6	6	6	6
Universiti Teknologi PETRONAS	-	-	-	9	10	10	9	9	8	7
Monash University Malaysia	-	-	-	-	9	8	7	7	7	8
Universiti Malaysia Pahang	-	-	-	-	7	11	11	11	10	9
University of Nottingham Malaysia	-	-	-	-	11	9	10	10	11	10
Universiti Malaysia Perlis	-	-	8	10	8	7	8	8	9	11
International Islamic University of Malaysia	-	-	-	8	16	12	14	12	12	12
International Medical University	-	-	-	-	20	20	-	20	17	13
Universiti Malaysia Terengganu	-	-	-	13	15	16	15	14	15	14
Universiti Malaysia Sabah	-	-	-	-	12	15	13	13	13	15
Universiti Tunku Abdul Rahman	-	-	-	12	14	13	12	15	14	16
Universiti Malaysia Sarawak	-	-	-	11	18	17	17	16	16	17
Multimedia University	6	6	7	7	13	14	16	17	18	18
Universiti Tun Hussein Onn Malaysia	-	-	-	-	19	19	-	18	20	19
Universiti Tenaga Nasional	-	-	-	-	17	18	-	19	19	20
UCSI University	-	-	-	-	-	-	-	-	21	21
Universiti Teknikal Malaysia Melaka	-	-	-	-	20	20	-	21	22	22
Universiti Kuala Lumpur	-	-	-	-	-	-	-	-	23	-
Universiti Utara Malaysia	-	-	-	-	-	-	-	22	-	-

=== Scimago Institutions Ranking ===
Ranking For Malaysia Region - Top 20
Institution	2009	2010	2011	2012	2013	2014	2015	2016	2017	2018	2019	2020
University of Malaya	6	7	8	4	3	3	3	1	1	1	1	1
Universiti Putra Malaysia	1	2	2	2	2	2	2	3	2	3	3	2
Universiti Teknologi Malaysia	3	5	9	5	5	5	5	4	4	2	2	3
Universiti Sains Malaysia	2	1	1	1	1	1	1	2	3	4	4	4
Universiti Kebangsaan Malaysia	5	6	5	3	4	4	4	5	5	5	5	5
Monash University Malaysia	-	8	4	6	6	8	8	11	7	6	6	6
Universiti Malaysia Pahang	-	-	10	14	14	18	17	15	12	10	9	7
Universiti Teknologi MARA	8	11	11	10	9	6	6	6	6	7	7	8
Universiti Teknologi PETRONAS	10	14	16	11	15	14	12	8	9	9	11	9
International Medical University	-	-	18	17	18	17	15	22	15	11	8	10
International Islamic University Malaysia	9	12	14	12	11	10	10	9	13	10	10	11
Universiti Malaysia Perlis	-	15	15	13	13	13	11	13	10	8	14	12
University of Nottingham Malaysia	-	4	3	7	7	7	9	17	8	9	13	13
Universiti Tun Hussein Onn Malaysia	-	-	19	19	12	11	7	7	11	11	12	14
Sunway University	-	-	-	-	-	-	-	-	-	21	20	15
Universiti Tunku Abdul Rahman	-	-	6	9	10	12	14	20	18	12	21	16
Universiti Malaysia Sabah	7	10	12	16	17	20	23	21	20	14	18	16
Universiti Malaysia Sarawak	-	9	12	14	17	18	21	19	20	22	19	17
Melaka Manipal Medical College	-	-	-	-	-	-	-	-	-	-	-	18
Universiti Tenaga Nasional	-	13	17	18	16	15	16	12	17	17	24	19
Universiti Sultan Zainal Abidin	-	-	-	-	-	-	-	-	-	-	16	19
Universiti Teknikal Malaysia Melaka	-	-	-	20	21	16	13	14	14	13	15	20

=== Round University Ranking ===
World Ranking
Institution	2010	2011	2012	2013	2014	2015	2016	2017	2018	2019	2020	2021
University of Malaya	-	-	-	-	-	-	269	268	213	156	86	113
Universiti Sains Malaysia	-	-	-	-	-	-	342	296	297	256	238	240
Universiti Kebangsaan Malaysia	466	-	504	481	518	-	427	318	422	303	275	257
Universiti Putra Malaysia	516	510	566	529	533	513	362	350	363	336	226	266
Universiti Teknologi Malaysia	-	-	-	-	-	591	404	351	271	224	199	287
Universiti Malaysia Perlis	-	-	-	-	-	-	-	-	-	-	-	703
Universiti Teknologi PETRONAS	-	-	-	-	-	734	-	-	543	527	486	-
Universiti Utara Malaysia	566	563	634	670	683	737	671	680	639	663	-	-
Universiti Teknologi MARA	-	-	-	-	-	734	-	-	-	-	-	-

=== Ranking Web of Universities (Webometrics) ===
Ranking For Malaysia Region - Top 20
Institution	2012	2013	2014	2015	2016	2017	2018	2019	2020	2021	2022
University of Malaya	6	5	4	1	1	1	1	1	1	1	1
Universiti Teknologi Malaysia	5	3	1	2	3	2	2	2	2	2	2
Universiti Putra Malaysia	4	2	2	4	4	4	3	3	4	3	3
Universiti Sains Malaysia	1	1	3	3	2	3	4	4	3	4	4
Universiti Kebangsaan Malaysia	2	4	5	5	5	5	5	5	5	5	5
Universiti Teknologi MARA	3	6	6	6	6	6	6	6	6	6	6
International Islamic University Malaysia	8	8	7	10	8	8	7	7	7	7	7
Universiti Malaysia Pahang	22	19	14	15	10	14	10	9	8	8	8
Universiti Teknologi PETRONAS	13	15	19	18	17	15	14	11	11	11	9
Universiti Utara Malaysia	10	12	12	11	15	10	11	10	10	10	10
Universiti Tun Hussein Onn Malaysia	15	17	10	8	9	12	12	8	9	12	11
University of Nottingham Malaysia	24	16	21	9	13	13	15	16	16	15	12
Universiti Teknikal Malaysia Melaka	20	24	15	20	19	19	17	17	12	9	13
Universiti Pendidikan Sultan Idris	-	-	-	-	-	-	-	-	-	14	14
Universiti Malaysia Perlis	16	10	11	12	12	9	8	12	13	13	15
Universiti Tunku Abdul Rahman	17	18	16	17	18	17	16	14	15	17	16
Multimedia University	7	7	13	13	11	11	13	13	14	16	17
Universiti Tenaga Nasional	12	14	22	7	7	7	9	15	17	18	18
Universiti Malaysia Sabah	9	9	8	14	14	16	18	19	18	19	19
Universiti Malaysia Sarawak	21	-	18	16	16	18	19	18	19	20	20

=== Webometrics Transparent Ranking: Top Universities by Google Scholar Citations ===
World Ranking
Institution	2016	2017	2018	2019	2020	2021	2022
Universiti Putra Malaysia	915	817	635	646	366	262	344
University of Malaya	491	545	413	438	415	333	387
Universiti Teknologi Malaysia	928	885	699	680	438	326	400
Universiti Sains Malaysia	428	598	508	516	426	324	433
Universiti Teknologi MARA	1552	1345	1289	1287	729	585	708
International Islamic University Malaysia	1597	1295	1095	1165	848	707	883
Universiti Utara Malaysia	2580	2636	1922	1447	1013	867	1010
Universiti Malaysia Pahang	1671	1609	1409	1376	969	829	1011
Universiti Teknologi PETRONAS	1641	1620	1616	1652	1007	853	1024
Universiti Malaysia Sabah	1288	1704	1799	1848	981	843	1026
Universiti Tun Hussein Onn Malaysia	2366	2059	1832	1930	1034	873	1042
Universiti Malaysia Perlis	1913	1844	1674	1611	1031	868	1082
Universiti Tunku Abdul Rahman	1459	1418	1056	1145	1058	930	1142
Universiti Malaysia Terengganu	2309	2375	2537	2358	1150	1006	1174
Universiti Teknikal Malaysia Melaka	2346	2330	2529	2611	1108	977	1179
Universiti Malaysia Sarawak	1578	1605	1566	1571	1146	1004	1215
Multimedia University	1338	1183	1345	1113	1147	1035	1261
University of Nottingham Malaysia	1735	1742	1564	1580	1414	1238	1381
Universiti Sultan Zainal Abidin	2842	2287	1995	1678	1446	1353	1406
Universiti Pendidikan Sultan Idris	2463	2473	2716	2739	1548	1383	1562
International Medical University	1690	1482	1959	1739	1540	1429	1575
Universiti Sains Islam Malaysia	2666	2804	2890	2716	1608	1427	1614
Universiti Tenaga Nasional	2386	1642	1518	1394	1624	1411	1615
Universiti Malaysia Kelantan	3154	2799	2797	2764	1697	1506	1729
Universiti Kuala Lumpur	3271	3333	2631	2651	1680	1514	1767
UCSI University	2562	2925	2500	2556	-	1667	1799
Universiti Pertahanan Nasional Malaysia	2765	2510	2148	2003	2124	1920	2192
Universiti Kebangsaan Malaysia	740	632	1569	1592	1830	1739	2306
Xiamen University Malaysia	-	4036	3824	3709	2638	2577	2629
Curtin University Malaysia	-	-	2208	2470	2291	2159	2671
Swinburne University of Technology Sarawak Campus	3836	3502	3393	3505	2585	2415	2838
SEGi University	4295	4172	4138	4226	2686	2483	2891
Management and Science University	-	-	5297	4390	2737	2595	3029
AIMST University	2997	3279	2650	2291	2925	2615	3171
Lincoln University College Malaysia	-	4770	4404	4056	2965	2755	3180
MAHSA University	4148	4083	3262	3491	3099	2901	3367
University of Selangor	4620	4757	4870	5069	3076	2960	3483
Tunku Abdul Rahman University College	4540	4811	4315	4492	3490	3225	3546
Asia Pacific University	4438	4594	4484	4526	3484	3347	3779
INTI International University	4399	4437	4910	5055	-	3651	3835
Open University Malaysia	-	-	4408	4595	-	3707	4339
Manipal University College Malaysia	-	-	-	-	-	-	4572
TATI University College	-	-	4950	5756	3773	3689	4605
Perdana University	3570	-	4273	4112	3598	3422	4664
Infrastructure University Kuala Lumpur	-	-	-	-	-	-	4678
University College of Technology Sarawak	4715	-	-	4308	3794	3728	4709
Quest International University Perak	4681	4615	4544	4264	3601	3497	-
Sunway University	1668	1553	1226	1279	1721	-	-
International Centre for Education in Islamic Finance	3352	3462	2588	2646	-	-	-
Malaysia University of Science & Technology	-	-	4905	4623	-	-	-
Al-Madinah International University	-	3786	4490	4937	-	-	-
Cyberjaya University College of Medical Sciences	-	-	5100	5197	-	-	-
Universiti Tun Abdul Razak	4357	4618	4979	5316	-	-	-
HELP University	-	-	5514	5439	-	-	-
University of Reading Malaysia	-	-	5409	5522	-	-	-
Nilai University	4264	4923	5292	5590	-	-	-
Raffles University Iskandar	-	-	-	5886	-	-	-
KDU University College	-	-	-	5986	-	-	-
DRB-HICOM University of Automotive Malaysia	-	-	-	6076	-	-	-
Wawasan Open University	-	-	5289	6163	-	-	-
Taylor's University	-	2441	-	-	-	-	-
Selangor International Islamic University College	4934	-	-	-	-	-	-

=== WURI Global Top 100 Innovative Universities Rankings ===
Global Ranking
Institution	2021
Universiti Kuala Lumpur	82
Universiti Teknologi MARA	201-300

=== Webometrics Transparent Ranking: Institutional Repositories by Google Scholar ===
World Ranking
Institution	2022
Universiti Teknologi MARA Institutional Repository	101
Universiti Putra Malaysia Institutional Repository	343
University of Malaya Students' Repository	461
Universiti Teknologi Malaysia Institutional Repository	503
Universiti Utara Malaysia E Theses	607
Universiti Malaysia Kelantan Institutional Repository	1009
University of Malaya Research Repository	1124
Universiti Malaysia Pahang Institutional Repository	1142
Universiti Sains Malaysia Institutional Repository	1162
Universiti Tunku Abdul Rahman (UTAR) Institutional Repository	1221
Universiti Kuala Lumpur Institutional Repository	1299
Universiti Kebangsaan Malaysia Journal Article Repository	1516
Universiti Malaysia Sarawak Institutional Repository	1562
Universiti Malaysia Perlis Library Digital Repository	2354
Universiti Malaysia Sabah Institutional Repository	2431
Universiti Tenaga Nasional Library Digital Repository	2575
University of Malaya Common Repository	3225
Universiti Teknikal Malaysia Melaka Repository	3426
INTI Institutional Repository	3751
Universiti Tun Hussein Onn Malaysia Institutional Repository	3751

== National Rankings ==
=== MQA Discipline Based Rating System (D-SETARA) ===
National Ranking (Note: Higher tier refer to better result.)
	2013	
Discipline	Tier	Institute
Engineering	5; 4; 3	CUS MUM MMU UniMAP UPM USM UTM UiTM UTP UNITEN UTAR; IUKL SUTSC UNMC UCSI UniSEL IIUM UKM UM UMP UMS UniMAS UTeM UTHM; UPNM
Health Sciences	5; 4; 3	UM IMU MSU IIUM USM; TIUCT UCSI UKM UPM UiTM UTAR; OUM UniMAS
Hospitality & Tourism	6; 5; 4; 3	TU; MSU SunwayU UM UiTM; UUM; UMS
Medicine, Dentistry & Pharmacy	5; 4; 3	UM; AIMST CUCMS IMU MUM IIUM UKM UMS UniMAS UPM USM UiTM; UCSI USIM
