= Arham Abdullah =

Malaysian politician

Yang Berbahagia Dato' Prof. Ts. Dr. Arham Abdullah DPSK

7th Vice Chancellor of the Universiti Malaysia Kelantan
- Incumbent
- Assumed office 16 February 2025
- Chancellor: Muhammad V
- Preceded by: Razli Che Razak

Personal details
- Born: 8 August 1975 (age 51) Johor, Malaysia
- Education: Universiti Teknologi Malaysia (BEng & MEng); Loughborough University (PhD)
- Profession: Academic

Arham bin Abdullah (born 8 August 1975) is a Malaysian academic and engineer who has served as Vice Chancellor of the Universiti Malaysia Kelantan since February 2025.

== Education ==
Arham obtained a bachelor's degree of Civil Engineering from the Universiti Teknologi Malaysia in 1998 and a Master of Engineering Management in 1999. He subsequently obtained a Doctor of Philosophy Construction Management from Loughborough University in 2003.

== Career ==
Arham began his career as a lecturer at UTM in 1999, having been appointed as deputy director (Innovation) at the UTM Innovation and Commercialization Center from 2010 to 2014.

He was then seconded to the Department of Higher Education for five years starting in 2014 as Director of the Industrial Relations Division. In 2015, he was appointed as a member of the Boards of Director of Universiti Tun Hussein Onn. He was later appointed as Deputy Vice-Chancellor (Research and Innovation) of UMK in 2019 before being appointed as Vice Chancellor of Universiti Malaysia Kelantan in 2025.

== Honours ==
- Kelantan
  - Knight Commander of the Order of Loyalty to the Crown of Kelantan (DPSK) – Dato' (2025)
