= UCSI University =

Private university in Malaysia

- Type: Private
- Established: 1986
- Founder: Dato' Peter Ng
- Chancellor: YAM Tunku Zain Al-'Abidin ibni Tuanku Muhriz
- Vice-Chancellor: Professor Datuk Ir. Ts. Dr. Siti Hamisah Binti Tapsir
- Students: >10,000 (2021)
- Location: Taman Connaught, Cheras, Kuala Lumpur, Malaysia; 3°04′48″N 101°44′00″E
- Campus: Kuala Lumpur; Kuching; Bandar Springhill; Dhaka (Bangladesh Branch Campus)
- Website: www.ucsiuniversity.edu.my

UCSI main gate

UCSI University, originally University College Sedaya International (UCSI), is a private university in Malaysia. The university is accredited by the Malaysian Qualifications Agency (MQA), the Malaysian Medical Council (MMC), the Malaysian Nursing Board (MNB), and several other professional bodies.

Currently, all UCSI University's programmes have received a 100% employability score from the Malaysian Higher Education Ministry's Graduate Employability 2021-2022 survey.

UCSI University provides academic programs at undergraduate and postgraduate levels. These include programs in business, engineering, architecture, medicine, pharmacy, nursing, tourism, applied science, music, and social science.

Aligning to Malaysia's national aspiration through the National Principles or Rukun Negara coined in August 1970, the university attributes its commitment and achievement in fulfilling these four principles to its founding pillar, "Glory to God". The university also pledges to align the implementation of these principles to UN Global Goal's theme, "Leave No One Behind", fitting to one of its core values, "Compassion" represented by the letter "C" in its acronym "UCSI" (Universalism, Compassion, Sustainability and Integrity).

These principles are to be lived out and strategically implemented corporately by all staff and students consistent to UCSI Group's sustainability theme, "Together we shape the future".

== History ==
UCSI was founded in 1986 by Dato' Peter Ng as a computer-training institute in Petaling Jaya. It soon relocated to new premises in Kuala Lumpur to cater to growing student numbers and more academic programmes were offered. UCSI was accorded college status in 1990 by the Ministry of Education (Malaysia), marking its transition to Sedaya College, later known as Sedaya International College. In 2003, it attained university college status and was renamed University College Sedaya International (UCSI). By 2008, UCSI achieved full university status, becoming Malaysia's second private university.

UCSI University operates across four campuses: the Kuala Lumpur Campus, Sarawak Campus, Springhill Campus, and its most recent addition, the Bangladesh Branch Campus.

[UCSI College] serves as a sister institution, further complementing the university's educational offerings.

The university is commonly referred to as "Sedaya."

== Bandar Springhill Campus ==
The UCSI University Bandar Springhill campus is situated on a 40-acre site adjacent to UCSI Hospital in Bandar Springhill, Negeri Sembilan, near the Seremban business centre and Port Dickson. Part of the UCSI Health Metropolis development, the campus spans over 50,000 square feet across two blocks and includes lecture halls, seminar rooms, a library, and faculty offices.

The campus primarily hosts the Faculty of Medicine and Health Sciences, offering programmes in Doctor of Medicine (MD), Nursing, Optometry, and Healthy Aging, Medical Aesthetics and Regenerative Medicine. (Programmes from the School of Optometry and the School of Healthy Aging, Aesthetics and Regenerative Medicine are also offered at the Kuala Lumpur campus.) Students at the Springhill campus have access to the adjacent UCSI Hospital for clinical practice. The university also plans to introduce programmes from the Faculty of Business Management and the Faculty of Hospitality and Tourism Management at the campus.

Faculties:

- Faculty of Medicine and Health Sciences
- School of Hospitality and Tourism Management
- School of Business and Management
- Pre-U Studies
- Centre for Languages

== Bangladesh Campus ==
In 2022 UCSI University established a branch campus in Bangladesh located in Kemal Atatürk Avenue, Dhaka and is the first international branch campus of a foreign university to be established in Bangladesh. Approved by the Ministry of Education and the University Grants Commission (UGC) of Bangladesh in 2022, the campus officially commenced operations in May 2023. It is located in the Banani area of Dhaka, occupying a 17-story building with over 45,000 square feet of modern academic space. The institution offers a variety of undergraduate and postgraduate programs in fields such as Business, Computer Science and Social Sciences. As a branch of the Malaysian-based UCSI University—which is ranked among the top 300 universities globally in the QS World University Rankings; the Bangladesh campus provides students with access to international faculty, dual-campus collaboration opportunities, and state-of-the-art facilities including smart classrooms and specialized laboratories.

== Notable alumni ==
- Aina Abdul, Malaysian singer, songwriter, actress (Bachelor of Contemporary Music, 2021)
