= Malaysia University of Science & Technology =

University in Petaling Jaya, Malaysia

Coordinates: 3.1054°N 101.5919°E

- Other name: MUST
- Type: Private
- Established: January 1997
- Location: Petaling Jaya, Selangor, Malaysia
- Website: www.must.edu.my

The Malaysia University of Science and Technology (MUST) was established in January 1997 when, then Prime Minister, Mahathir Mohamad and a delegation from Malaysia made a working visit to Massachusetts Institute of Technology (MIT) and endorsed the establishment of a university modeled after MIT. MUST is known for its focus on science, technology, and engineering education.

MUST offers undergraduate and postgraduate degree programs in various fields, including engineering, computer science, business, and law. MUST is a separate university and has not affiliated or not have a direct relationship with the Universiti Sains Malaysia (USM) and Universiti Teknologi Malaysia (UTM).

== Faculties ==
- School of Business
- School of Science and Engineering
- School of Pre-University Studies

== Collaboration ==
=== Universities ===
- University of Tasmania (UTAS)
- Rotterdam Mainport University of Applied Sciences
- Swinburne University of Technology, Australia

=== Industries ===
The collaboration between MUST and Federation of Malaysian Forwarders (FMFF) sees a tie up extending to about 2000 of its member companies
