= Management & Science University =

Private university in Shah Alam, Malaysia

Coordinates: 3.077504°N 101.552852°E

Management and Science University
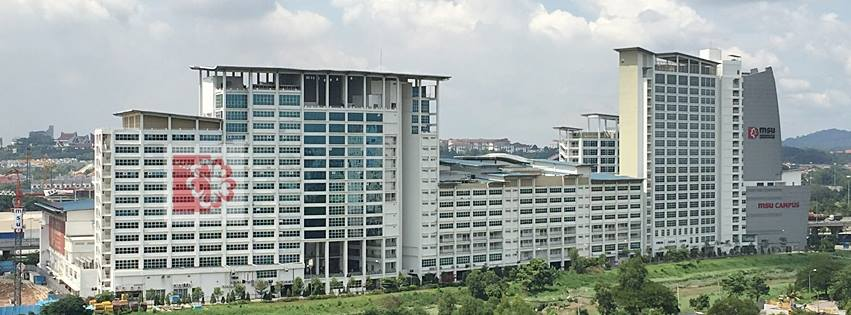
- MSU main campus
- Former names: University College of Technology & Management Malaysia
- Motto: Transforming Lives, Enriching Future
- Type: Private
- Established: 2001
- Parent institution: MSU Holdings
- Chairman: Tan Sri Dato' Dr Wan Mohd Zahid Mohd Noordin
- Chancellor: Tengku Sarafudin Badlishah Ibni Sultan Sallehuddin
- President: Professor Tan Sri Dato' Wira Dr. Mohd Shukri Ab. Yajid
- Vice-Chancellor: Professor Puan Sri Datuk Dr Junainah Abd Hamid
- Academic staff: 655
- Students: ~14,999
- Location: Shah Alam, Selangor, Malaysia
- Campus: Urban
- Colours: Red, black and white
- Website: www.msu.edu.my

Management and Science University (abbreviated as MSU Malaysia or simply MSU) is a private university in Malaysia located in Shah Alam, Selangor. Founded in 2001 as University College of Technology & Management Malaysia,it became a full fledged university in October 2004 as Management & Science University, when the current university building was inaugurated.

The university is a member of the MSU Holdings which comprises MSU College, Management & Science Institute, MSU Kids, MSU Medical Centre, MSU Foundation, Sekolah Bina Insan MSU Foundation, Jakarta Institute of Technology and Health, and Ilmu Ekonomi Penguji High School.

A graduate tracer study by the Ministry of Higher Education Malaysia (MoHE) shows 98.6% of MSU graduates secure employment within six months of their graduation. MSU was ranked at 541 to 550 in the 2020 QS World University Rankings and 271 in the 2019 QS Asia University Rankings that makes MSU among top 51% world's best universities and top 1.8% Asia's best universities respectively. MSU was also ranked at 301+ in the 2019 Times Higher Education World University Impact Rankings.

== Medical centre ==
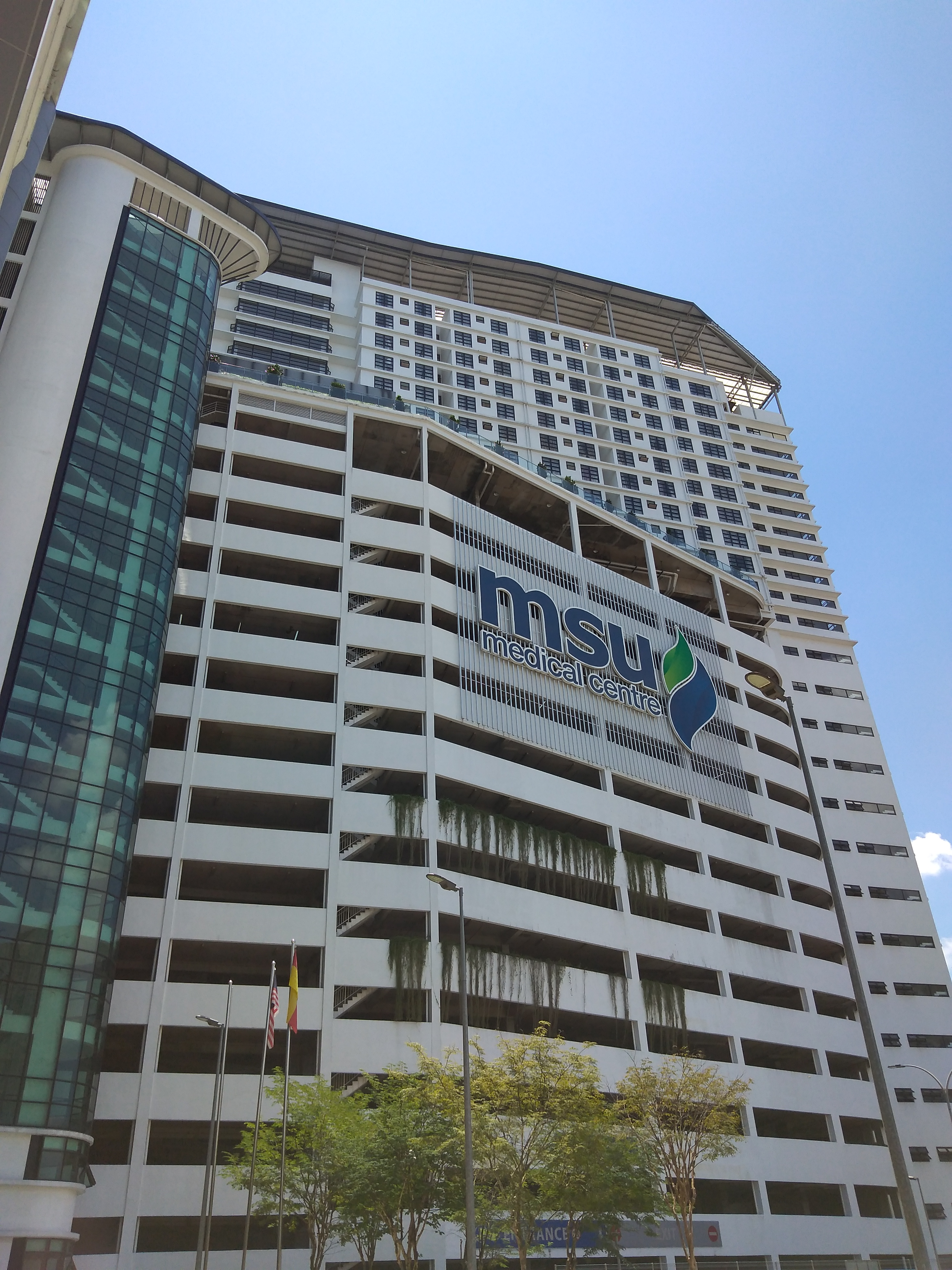
MSUMC is a private specialist hospital

The MSU Medical Centre is a 14 levels private specialist hospital in Shah Alam, operated by MSU itself. Construction started in 2009 and was inaugurated in 2014 by the Sultan of Selangor.

== Academic profile ==
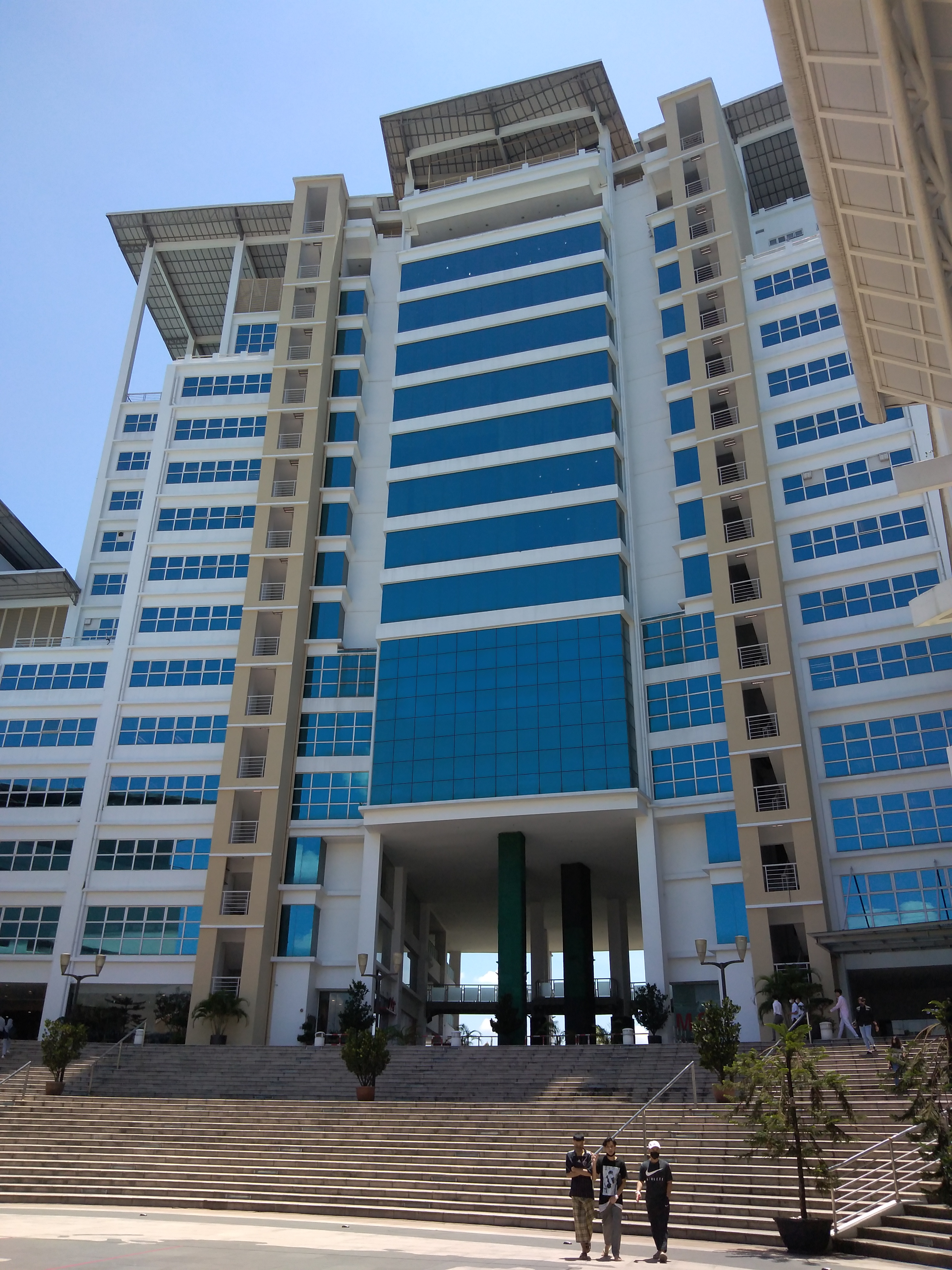
The main building of MSU

=== University rankings ===
==== Quacquarelli Symonds (QS) ====
Since 2018, Management and Science University has been ranked within the Quacquarelli Symonds Rankings, starting with the QS Asia University Rankings. MSU holds the following positions within the QS Rankings and QS Rating:

- Ranked =597 in the QS World University Rankings 2026
- Ranked #541-550 in the QS World University Rankings 2020
- Ranked #129 in the QS Asia University Rankings 2025
- Ranked #271 in the QS Asia University Rankings 2019
- Ranked #217 in the QS Asia University Rankings 2018

==== Malaysia Quality Agency (MQA) ====
- The MQA is responsible for the Rating for Higher Education Institutions in Malaysia (SETARA) and the Discipline-Based Rating System (D-SETARA).

Year	Rank	Valuer
2017	Tier 5 (Excellence)	SETARA
2017	Tier 5 (Excellence)	D-SETARA Health Sciences
2017	Tier 5 (Excellence)	D-SETARA Tourism & Hospitality

==== Other recognition ====
- In 2016, Management and Science University was awarded Best Entrepreneurial Private University by Ministry of Higher Education Malaysia

== See also ==
- List of universities in Malaysia
