= Universiti Malaysia Kelantan =

Public university in Kelantan, Malaysia

Coordinates: 6°09′52″N 102°16′57″E

University of Malaysia Kelantan
- اونيۏرسيتي مليسيا كلنتن
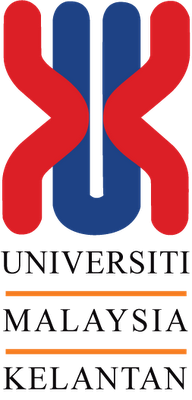
- Emblem
- Motto in English: Entrepreneurship Is Our Thrust
- Type: Public
- Established: 2007; 19 years ago
- Chairman: Dato’ Dr. Hassan Basri bin Awang Mat Dahan
- Chancellor: Sultan Muhammad V, Sultan of Kelantan
- Vice-Chancellor: Dato' Prof. Ts. Dr. Arham bin Abdullah
- Pro-Chancellor: Tengku Muhammad Fakhry Petra ibni Almarhum Sultan Ismail Petra, Tengku Mahkota of Kelantan
- Administrative staff: 1,200
- Students: 9,000
- Undergraduates: 6,000
- Postgraduates: 500
- Location: Bachok (main), Pengkalan Chepa, Jeli, Kelantan, Malaysia
- Nickname: UMK
- Website: www.umk.edu.my
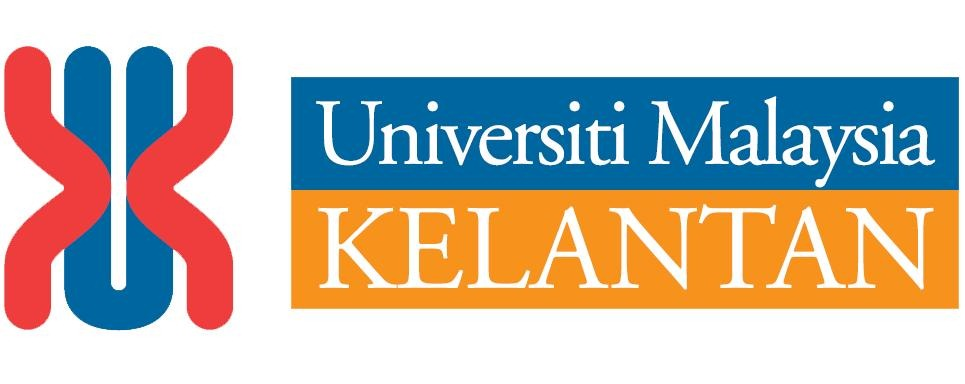

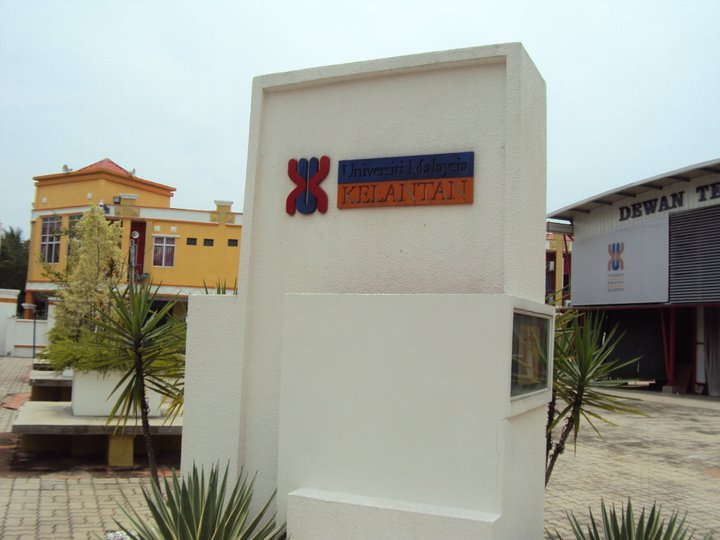
Landmark of UMK

Universiti Malaysia Kelantan (UMK; English: University of Malaysia, Kelantan) is a public university in Kelantan, Malaysia. The formation of the university was mooted during the tabling of the Ninth Malaysia Plan and approved by the cabinet of Malaysia on 14 June 2006. The launching ceremony was held at the end of 2006 by Prime Minister, Y.A.B. Tun Abdullah Ahmad Badawi. The first students were enrolled with the commencement of the June 2007 semester.

The Prime Minister of Malaysia announced the government's approval to establish a university in Kelantan under the Ninth Malaysia Plan on 31 March 2006.

On 14 June 2006, a Cabinet Meeting approved the establishment of the university. Taglines such as “Entrepreneurship is Our Thrust” and “Entrepreneurial University” are used to promote the philosophy of the university. Studies are grouped into three fields:

- Entrepreneurship and Business;
- Creative Technology and Heritage;
- Agro-Industry and Science of Natural Resources.

Apart from the three fields of study, emphasis is given to acquiring language and soft skills.

The Growth of the university

- The temporary campus of UMK at Taman Bendahara began its official operation on 1 July 2007 with the registration of 295 pioneering students. On its second year of operation, beginning July 2008, the university registered 332 students.

The first Vice-Chancellor of University Malaysia Kelantan was Prof. Dato’ Ir. Dr. Zainai bin Mohamed, who was appointed on 1 October 2006.

UMK operates in three campuses from its main campus in Bachok, second campus in Jeli and also their inaugural campus in Pengkalan Chepa, Kota Bharu.

== History ==
The establishment of the University of Kelantan Malaysia in the state of Kelantan has been made one of the components of the 9th Malaysia Plan to support the development of quality human capital in the country's higher education sector. The Prime Minister of Malaysia, Dato' Seri Abdullah bin Haji Ahmad Badawi, has announced the government's approval to set up a university in Kelantan in the presentation of the 9th Malaysia plan on March 31, 2006.

The Cabinet approved the establishment of the Malaysian University of Kelantan at the Cabinet Meeting on 14 June 2006. In all study programs, the Cabinet has also set the curriculum framework at UMK focused on entrepreneurship education and enterprises.

This is why stimulus phrases such as Entrepreneurship are commonly used as Our Thrust and Entrepreneurial University. Specializing in short and medium term growth is divided into three areas of study: Entrepreneurship and Business; Innovative and Heritage Technology and Agro-Industry and Science of Natural Resources.

Universiti Malaysia Kelanfan is the 19th public higher learning institution founded in Malaysia and located on a temporary campus in Taman Bendahara, Pengkalan Chepa, Kota Bharu. UMK officially began operations with the enrollment of 295 senior students on 1 July 2007.

The University of Kelantan Malaysia was firstly located at Kota Bharu Technology Institute, Kota Bharu, Kelantan. Professor Dato' Ir. Dr. Zainai Mohamed has been named as Universiti Malaysia Kelantan's first vice-chancellor, effective 1 October 2006.

=== First Convocation ===
UMK's first convocation was held from 15 to 19 September 2011 at the Bachok Campus in Bachok, Kelantan.

266 first graduates of UMK from the Faculty of Agro Industry and Natural Resources (42 people); Faculty of Entrepreneurship and Business (83 persons) and the Faculty of Creative Technology and Heritage (141 people) received a bachelor's degree of their faculties at the First Convocation of UMK which was held at a hotel in Kota Bharu, Kelantan on 19 September 2011.

Among the degrees awarded are: Bachelor of Entrepreneurship (Commerce) with Honours, Bachelor of Applied Science (Agriculture Technology Entrepreneurship) With Honours, Bachelor of Creative Technology with Honours, and Bachelor of Heritage Studies with Honours. One post-graduate student was awarded master's degree of Entrepreneurship (Management) and two with master's degree of Science (Agriculture Biotechnology). (Faculty of Veterinary Medicine had their first batch of graduates in 2014.)

UMK awarded an Honorary Degree of Doctor of Entrepreneurship (Human Capital Development) to the fifth Prime Minister of Malaysia, Tun Haji Abdullah Ahmad Badawi.

UMK simultaneously held the Proclamation ceremony of His Royal Highness Tuanku Chancellor, Sultan Muhammad V, the Sultan and Yang Di-Pertuan for the state of Kelantan Darul Naim as the Chancellor of UMK, and the appointment of His Royal Highness Dr. Tengku Muhammad Faiz Petra Ibni Sultan Ismail Petra, who is the Crown Prince of Kelantan as the Pro-Chancellor of UMK was held.

UMK introduced the logo of convocation which uses the colours of UMK; blue, orange and red.

UMK first graduates have become the first alumni, thus, a song titled "Detik Ini" was created by the university as a memento for them.

== Vice-chancellors ==
#	Name	Term start	Term end
1	Prof. Emeritus Dato' Ir. Dr. Zainai Mohamed	1 October 2006	31 December 2011
2	Prof. Datuk Dr. Raduan Che Rose	1 January 2012	31 December 2014
3	Prof. Dato' Dr. Mortaza Mohamed	1 January 2015	31 December 2017
4	Prof. Dato' Dr. Husaini Omar	1 January 2018	6 January 2020
5	Prof. Dato' Ts. Dr. Noor Azizi Ismail	7 January 2020	28 August 2021
6	Prof. Dato' Dr. Razli Che Razak	1 March 2022	23 November 2024
7	Dato' Prof. Ts. Dr. Arham Abdullah	16 February 2025	

== Pengkalan Chepa campus (City Campus) ==
The current enrolment reaches 6700 students. Starting from September 2011, the students will be placed at mainly Bachok and Jeli campuses according to the faculty.

Campus facilities Total area of City Campus is approximately 9 acres comprises Taman Bendahara - 10,600m2 and the Hostel - 10,530m2

== Bachok Campus ==
Universiti Malaysia Kelantan or UMK is a university in the state of Kelantan and is the country's 19th state university. It is located in the Bachok district, near the tourist area of the Tok Bali beach. UMK began operating officially on 1 September 2006. The campus covers an area of 779 acres and is being developed in two phases with the first phase covering an area of 254 acres with the other phase occupying the remaining 300 acres of landscape in the future. Part of the campus is made up of a former paddy plantation which is suitable for development. The area is surrounded by schools, villages and a technical skills development institute.

The campus is divided into eight zones with the First Phase containing the commercial, academic, public spaces and residential zones; whereas the Second Phase will incorporate a sports complex, a park, a staff residential complex, a commercial zone and a Wetland Park.

The main entrance to the campus under the First Phase is through the P2 door with the UMK mosque minaret as the main focus point. The building layout of the campus is pedestrian-friendly, with the buildings being separated from each other at a distance of 400 meters.

The First Phase of the development involves the entrepreneurship and business faculty, the arts faculty, the university's language centre, the academic administration building, lecture halls and rooms, the administrative building, public spaces; and the Islamic centre and the mosque. This phase currently houses around 2,160 undergraduates and 500 campus staff. The Bachok campus of UMK will be later transformed into a park campus.

== Jeli Campus ==
The Faculty of Agro Industry and Natural Resources was stationed at UMK Taman Bendahara in Pengkalan Chepa until 19 January 2012. The faculty has moved to the new campus in Gemang, Jeli. The campus is located on 270 acres that includes the department of sciences and technology of FASA as well as the administrative office. In April 2012, FASA was dissolved and two new faculties were formed. They are the Faculty of Agro-based Industry, Faculty of Earth Sciences and Faculty of BioTechnology and Technology with a total of 2489 undergraduates and postgraduates students. There are 174 academic staff and 55 non academic staff and 12 international academic staff.

For the September 2022 intake, students’ enrolment is 2489 students for ten undergraduate academic programmes and postgraduate programmes. There is many buildings in the campus which is shared by 3 Faculties and the administrative office. The campus has a lecture rooms, labs, two hall, library and hostels for the students.

== See also ==
- List of universities in Malaysia
