= AIMST University =

University in Bedong, Kedah, Malaysia

- Asian Institute of Medicine, Science & Technology; Universiti AIMST (Malay) ஆசிய மருத்துவம், அறிவியல் மற்றும் தொழில்நுட்ப நிறுவனம் (AIMST பல்கலைக்கழகம்) [romanized: Āciya maruttuvam, aṟiviyal maṟṟum toḻilnuṭpa niṟuvaṉam (AIMST palkalaikkaḻakam)] (Tamil)
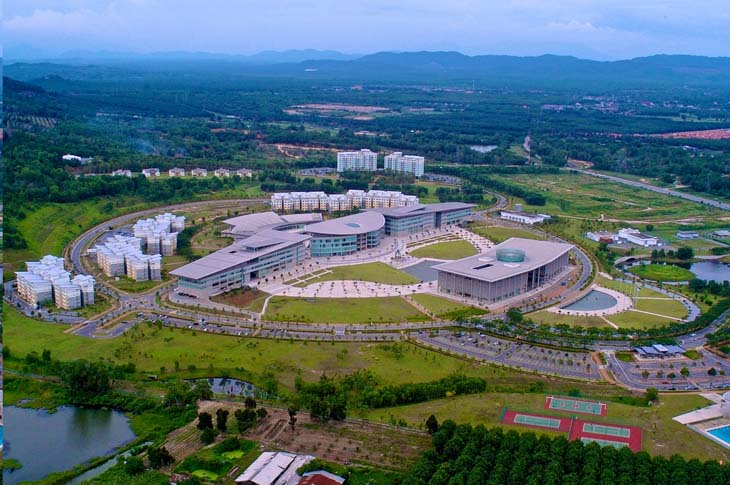
- Other name: AIMST
- Motto: Educating Tomorrow's Leaders
- Type: Private
- Established: 2001
- Academic affiliations: APUCEN
- Chancellor: S.A. Vigneswaran
- Vice-Chancellor: Kathiresan V. Sathasivam
- Administrative staff: 250
- Students: >3,500
- Location: Bedong, Kedah, Malaysia
- Colours: White, red, green
- Website: aimst.edu.my

Asian Institute of Medicine, Science and Technology (AIMST University) is a non-profit private university in Malaysia. It was established under the Maju Institute of Education Development (MIED), a non-profit organisation. The university was built by Malaysian Indian Congress (MIC) to provide tertiary education, particularly to Malaysian Indian students in the medical, science and engineering fields and business management. AIMST offers more than 32 degree programmes at the foundation, undergraduate, and postgraduate levels.

== Registration and accreditation ==
AIMST University is registered with the Ministry of Higher Education of Malaysia, under Sections 38 and 39 of the Private Higher Educational Institutions Act of 1996. It formally began operations on 30 October 2001, coinciding with its registration with the Department of Private Education under the Ministry of Higher Education.

The programmes are accredited by Malaysian Qualifications Agency (MQA) and Ministry of Higher Education (Malaysia) (MOHE) and recognised by the Public Services Department (JPA) AIMST University was rated tier 4 (Very Good) for the Malaysia Quality Agency (MQA) SETARA Rating in 2013. Aimst was rated tier 4 for Malaysia Quality Agency (MQA) D-SETARA Rating 2013 for Medical, Pharmacy and Dentist.

== History ==
Samy Vellu announced the opening of AIMST University during the 51st MIC General Assembly. The university was established by the MIC education arm, MIED Foundation (Maju Institute of Education Development). An application was submitted on the same day to set up AIMST at Sungai Petani, Kedah. The local firm of architects, Hijjas Kasturi Associates Bhd., was appointed by MIED as the master planner for the university; TMI-Nusantara (M) Sdn. Bhd. as the overall project manager; Minconsult Sdn Bhd as the Engineer, and KPK QS as the quantity surveyors.

== Campus life ==
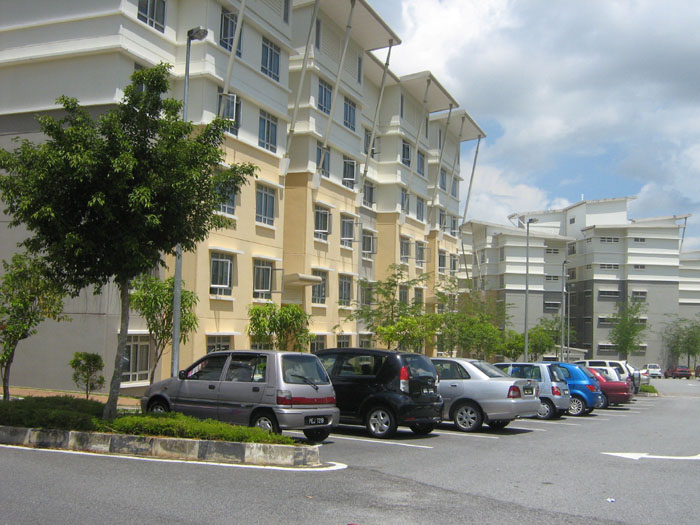
Hostel

=== Student accommodation ===
A hostel is provided for all students. Service includes meals at the on-campus cafeteria. Bus transportation to and from the university than is not sufficient for 80% of the students in campus.

==== Sports and recreation ====
The Aimst Indoor Sports Complex provides facilities for basketball, badminton, squash and table tennis; also available are a gymnasium and an outdoor Olympic-size swimming pool. Occasionally AIMST University hosts regional and international tournaments such as football, hockey and cricket matches.

== Gallery ==
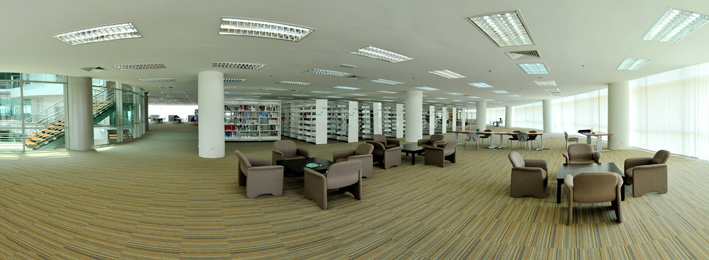
Aimst Library
