= University of Kuala Lumpur =

Private university in Malaysia

Coordinates: 3°09′34″N 101°42′06″E

- Universiti Kuala Lumpur
- Seal of the Universiti Kuala Lumpur
- Other names: UniKL
- Motto: Where Knowledge is Applied and Dreams Realized
- Type: Private, semi-government (wholly owned by Majlis Amanah Rakyat)
- Established: 20 August 2002; 23 years ago
- Chancellor: Abdullah of Pahang
- President: Azman Senin
- Students: Over 30,500 students (local and international students)
- Location: Kuala Lumpur, Malaysia
- Campus: 14 institutes spread across 12 campuses
- Language: English language (main)
- Colours: Navy & orange
- Website: www.unikl.edu.my

The University of Kuala Lumpur (Malay: Universiti Kuala Lumpur, UniKL) is a multi-campus technical university with its main campus based in Kuala Lumpur, Malaysia. Rated as a Tier-5 "Excellent University" by the Ministry of Higher Education Malaysia in 2009, 2011, 2013 and awarded Putra Brand Award in 2016. UniKL has 14 institutes spread across 12 campuses throughout Malaysia in Kuala Lumpur, Gombak, Cheras, Bangi, Kajang, Sepang, Taboh Naning, Pasir Gudang, Ipoh, Lumut and Kulim.

== Campuses and institutes ==
In 2012 the university had around 20,500 local and international students studying at 11 campuses throughout the country.

=== Universiti Kuala Lumpur Institute of Medical Science Technology (UniKL MESTECH) ===
Universiti Kuala Lumpur Institute of Medical Science Technology was incorporated in July 2008

Address: Lot No. A1-1, Jalan TKS 1, Taman Kajang Sentral, 43000 Kajang, Selangor

=== Universiti Kuala Lumpur Malaysia France Institute (UniKL MFI) ===
Universiti Kuala Lumpur Malaysia France Institute was incorporated in February 1995 as a collaborative project between Malaysia and France. The institute, located in Bandar Baru Bangi, Selangor became a branch campus of Universiti Kuala Lumpur in 2003. The technical programmes offered in the institute were mostly developed in collaboration with education institutions in France.

Address: Seksyen 14, Jalan Teras Jernang, 43650 Bandar Baru Bangi, Selangor

=== Universiti Kuala Lumpur British Malaysian Institute (UniKL BMI) ===
Universiti Kuala Lumpur British Malaysian Institute (UniKL BMI) was set up as a result of a partnership between the Malaysian and British government in 1998. Majlis Amanah Rakyat (MARA), representing the Malaysian government provided the infrastructure and manpower while the British government contributed support through industries such as the BAE Systems, British Airways, Standard Chartered Bank (M) Bhd and Rolls-Royce as well as its institutions which include Wigan & Leigh College and the University of Hertfordshire.

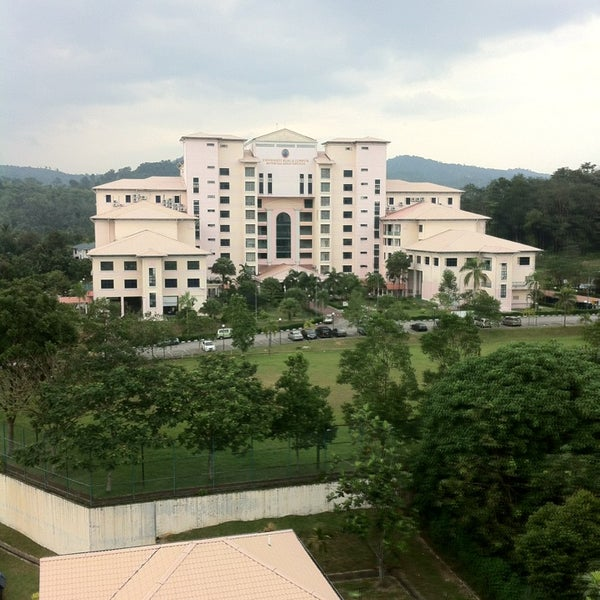
UniKL BMI Campus

Address: Batu 8 Jalan Sungai Pusu, 53100 Gombak, Selangor

=== Universiti Kuala Lumpur Malaysian Spanish Institute (UniKL MSI) ===
Universiti Kuala Lumpur Malaysian Spanish Institute (UniKL MSI) began its operation at a temporary campus in August 2002 and moved to its main campus on a 39-acre (160,000 m^{2}) piece of land in Kulim Hi Tech Park, Kedah in December 2003. A collaborative effort between the Malaysian and Spanish government.

Address: Kulim Hi Tech Park, 09000 Kulim, Kedah

=== Malaysian Institute of Information Technology, Universiti Kuala Lumpur City Campus (UniKL MIIT) ===
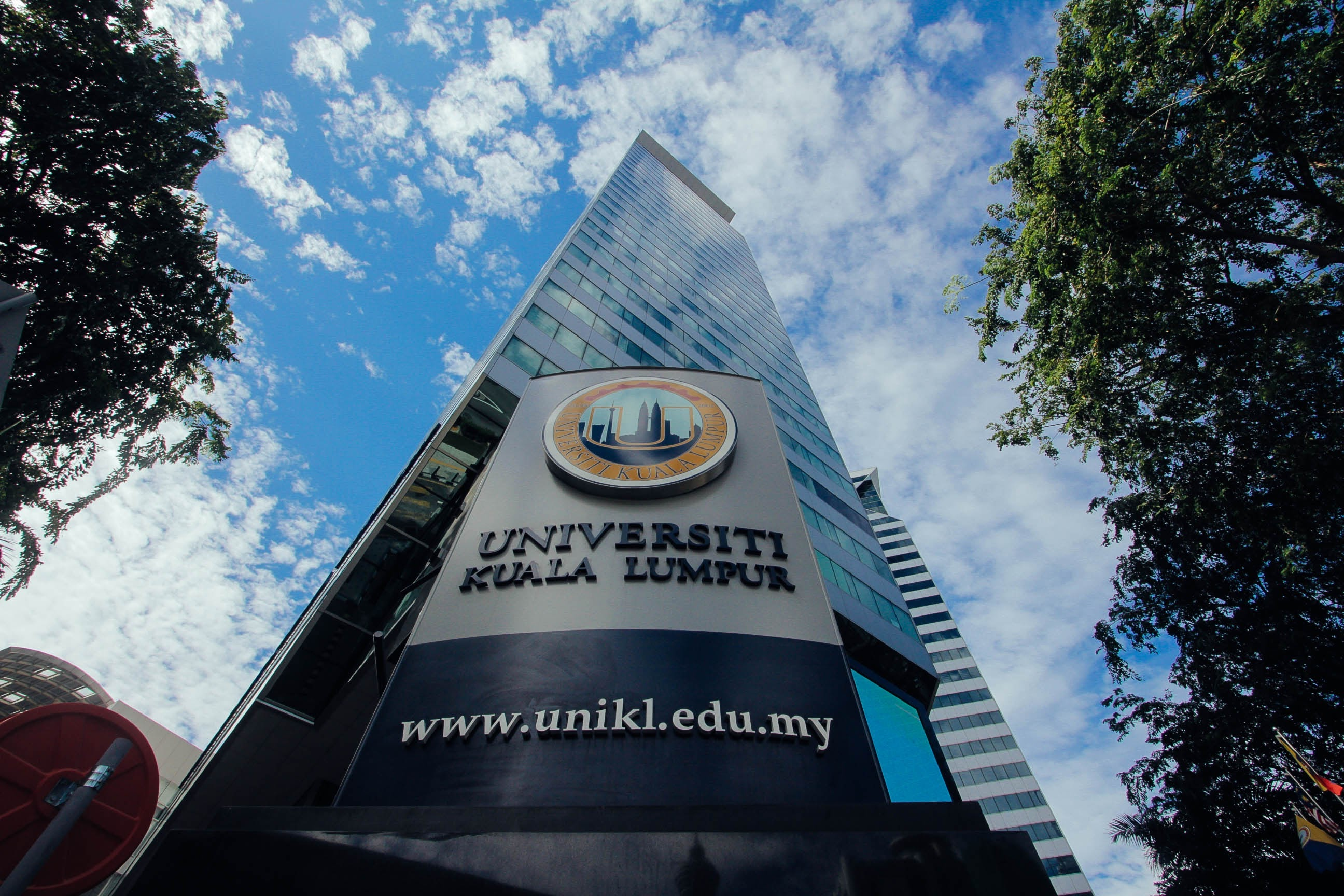
UniKL City Campus

Formerly known as Institut Infotech MARA, Malaysian Institute of Information Technology (MIIT) has provided IT education since 1982. It started off as Electronic Data Processing School of MARA and its objective then was to impart knowledge in computer programming.

Address: 1016, Jalan Sultan Ismail, 50250 Kuala Lumpur

=== Universiti Kuala Lumpur Malaysian Institute of Aviation Technology (UniKL MIAT) ===
Universiti Kuala Lumpur Malaysian Institute of Aviation Technology (UniKL MIAT) is the pioneer aviation institution in Malaysia and it is a wholly owned subsidiary of Majlis Amanah Rakyat (MARA). It is also the first Maintenance Training Organisation (MTO) approved by the Department of Civil Aviation Malaysia (DCA) to offer aircraft maintenance programmes.

Initially established as part of MARA Vocational Training or Institut Kemahiran MARA (IKM) in Jasin, Malacca for sheet metal and composite repair, avionics syllabus and powerplant energy programs. With Northrop-Rice U.S.A. as the FAA technology provider; it became MARA-Northrop Rice Institute (MNRI) and transferred to Subang; Selangor. With the expansion of the programmes and increased student enrollment, MNRI became known as the Malaysian Institute of Aviation Technology Sdn. Bhd. (MIAT) and moved to its current facility in Jenderam Hulu; Selangor closer to KLIA. When MARA combined all its high education institutes to be part of Universiti Kuala Lumpur, MIAT hereon known as Universiti Kuala Lumpur Malaysian Institute of Aviation Technology (UniKL MIAT). Further expansion of the program, UniKL-MIAT has opened up another campus facility located within the premises of the Subang airport in Subang, Shah Alam, Selangor.

Address: Lot 2891 Jalan Jenderam Hulu,43800 Dengkil, Selangor.

=== Universiti Kuala Lumpur Malaysian Institute of Chemical and Bioengineering Technology (UniKL MICET) ===
Universiti Kuala Lumpur Malaysian Institute of Chemical and Bioengineering Technology (UniKL MICET) is an institution of higher learning in the country that provides chemical based technology education. It is located within the Bio Valley of Malaysia.

Address: Bandar Vendor, Lot 1988, 19, 78000 Alor Gajah, Malacca

=== Universiti Kuala Lumpur Malaysian Institute of Marine Engineering Technology (UniKL MIMET) ===
Universiti Kuala Lumpur Malaysian Institute of Marine Engineering Technology (UniKL MIMET) was established in collaboration between Majlis Amanah Rakyat (MARA) and International Training Australia (ITA) that represented the Australian government as a training provider. Its permanent campus is located in Lumut, Perak, relatively known as the home base of the Royal Malaysian Navy.

=== Universiti Kuala Lumpur Royal College of Medicine Perak (UniKL RCMP) ===
Becoming part of Universiti Kuala Lumpur in 2005, Universiti Kuala Lumpur Royal College of Medicine Perak (UniKL RCMP) Address: 3, Jalan Greentown, 30450 Ipoh, Perak

=== Universiti Kuala Lumpur Malaysia - Italy Design Institute (UniKL MIDI) ===
Formally known as Institute of Product Design and Manufacturing (UniKL IPROM). Located in Cheras, Kuala Lumpur.

Address: 119, Jalan 7/91, Taman Shamelin Perkasa, 56100 Kuala Lumpur

=== Universiti Kuala Lumpur Malaysian Institute of Industrial Technology (UniKL MITEC) ===
UniKL MITEC, formerly known as UniKL Pasir Gudang, specialises in Industrial Logistics, Quality Engineering, Plant Maintenance, Oil and Gas, and Instrumentation and Control Engineering. The ground-breaking ceremony of UniKL Pasir Gudang worth RM 196.5 million on a 24 hectare piece of land was officiated by the former Minister of Entrepreneur and Co-operative Development, Dato’ Seri Mohamed Khaled Nordin in March 2008. The campus was ready in 2010 at Pasir Gudang with the maximum capacity of 2,500 students.

Address: Jln Persiaran Sinaran Ilmu, Bandar Seri Alam, Masai, 81750 Johor Bahru, Johor

=== Universiti Kuala Lumpur Business School (UBIS) ===
Universiti Kuala Lumpur Business School, formerly known as Universiti Kuala Lumpur International School of Entrepreneurship (UniKL ISE) was established in 2008.

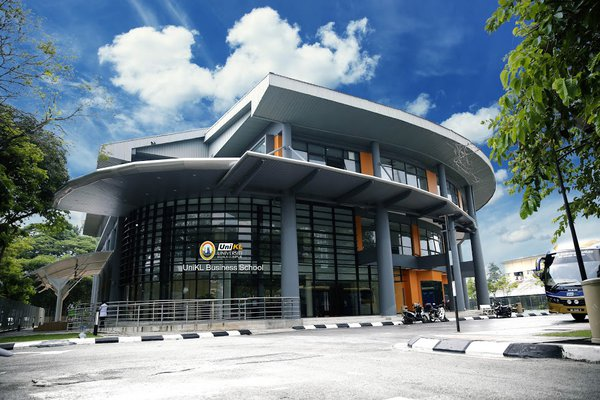
UniKL Business School (Gurney Campus)

Address: (Gurney Road Campus) Jalan Pesiaran Gurney, Kampung Datuk Keramat, 54000 Kuala Lumpur
(Quill City Mall Campus) Quill City Mall, Jalan Sultan Ismail, Bandar Wawasan, 50000 Kuala Lumpur

== Rankings ==
Year	Rank	Valuer
2018	351-400	QS Asian University Rankings
2019	351-400	QS Asian University Rankings
2020	301-350	QS Asian University Rankings
2021	291-300	QS Asian University Rankings
2022	301-350	QS Asian University Rankings
2023	351-400	QS Asian University Rankings
