= Universiti Malaysia Terengganu =

Public university in Terengganu, Malaysia

Coordinates: 5°24′19″N 103°05′16″E

University Malaysia Terengganu (UMT)
- Universiti Malaysia Terengganu (UMT)
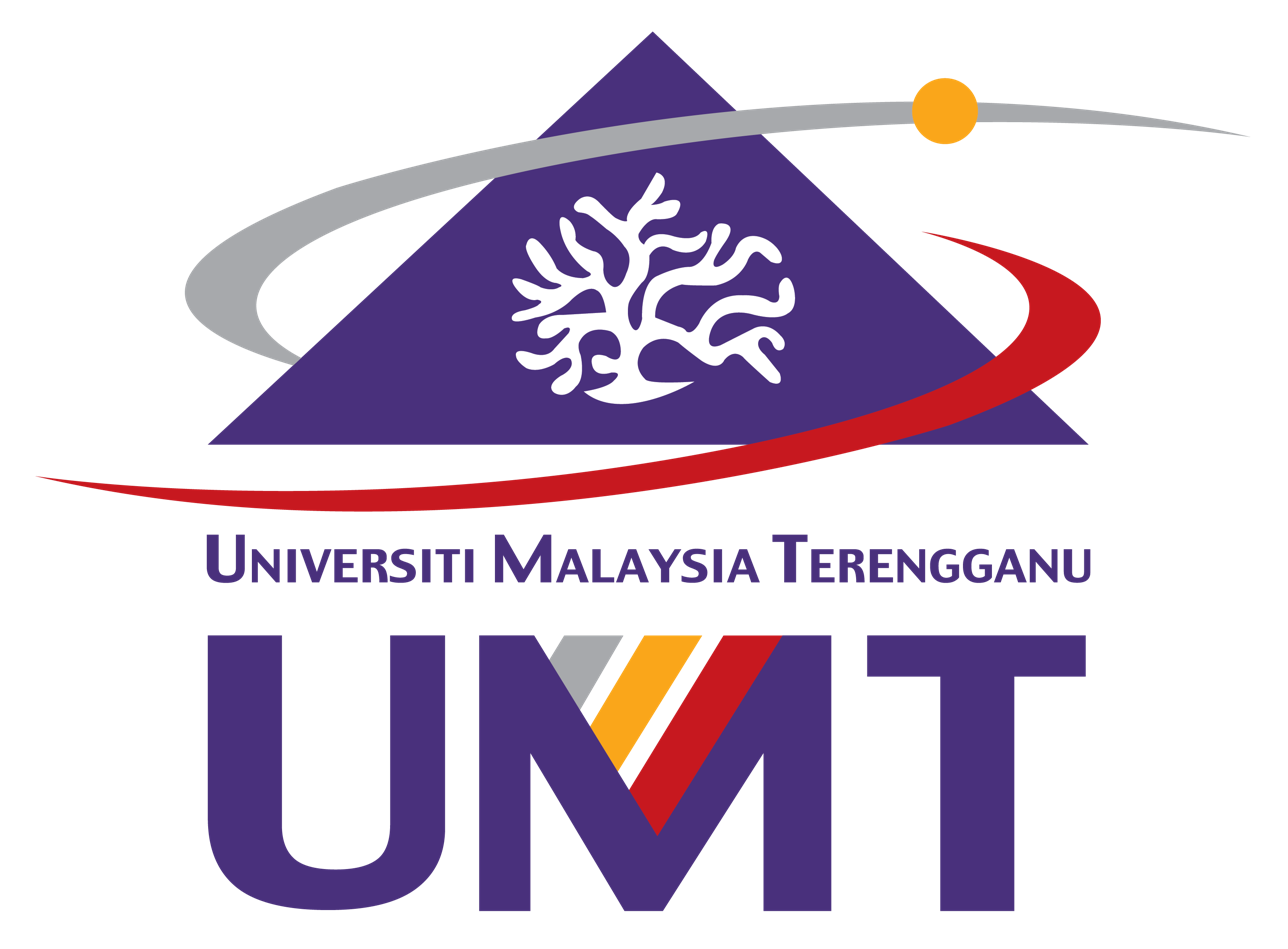
- Emblem
- Former name: Kolej Universiti Sains dan Teknologi Malaysia
- Motto: Terokaan Seluas Lautan Demi Kelestarian Sejagat
- Motto in English: Ocean of Discoveries For Global Sustainability
- Type: Public
- Established: 20 June 2001; 25 years ago
- Affiliations: ASAIHL
- Chancellor: Sultanah Nur Zahirah, Sultanah of Terengganu
- Vice-Chancellor: Prof. Ts. Dr. Mohd Zamri Ibrahim
- Location: 21030 Kuala Terengganu, Terengganu, MALAYSIA, Kuala Terengganu, Kuala Nerus, Terengganu, Malaysia
- Campus: Urban
- Colours: Orange, White, Purple, Red, Grey
- Website: umt.edu.my

The Universiti Malaysia Terengganu (University of Malaysia, Terengganu) or UMT, formerly known as Kolej Universiti Sains dan Teknologi Malaysia (Malaysian University College of Science and Technology) or KUSTEM, is a university in Kuala Nerus District, Terengganu, Malaysia. It was officially chartered on 1 February 2007.

== History of Universiti Malaysia Terengganu (UMT) ==
Emblem of Kolej Universiti Sains dan Teknologi Malaysia. (2001–2007)

Universiti Malaysia Terengganu began as Universiti Pertanian Malaysia's Centre for Fisheries and Marine Science, located at Mengabang Telipot, Kuala Terengganu. It provided facilities for both students and lecturers from the Fisheries and Marine Science programmes to conduct their practical sessions and also researches.

Eventually, the Faculty of Fisheries and Marine Science of Universiti Pertanian Malaysia (UPM) in Serdang was transferred to Kuala Terengganu, and the Centre transformed into a branch campus, being renamed Universiti Pertanian Malaysia Terengganu (UPMT) in June 1996. The name of the faculty was also changed to the Faculty of Applied Sciences and Technology. Also formed were the Faculty of Science and Professional Literature and the Matriculation Centre.

Later on, the Cabinet of Malaysia had approved the establishment of Terengganu University College (KUT) on 5 May 1999 as an associate campus of UPM. Then Terengganu Universiti College was given autonomy on 1 May 2001 and was renamed Kolej Universiti Sains dan Teknologi Malaysia (KUSTEM) on 20 June 2001.

On 1 February 2007, KUSTEM was given the status of a full-fledged university, and with that elevation, it was renamed again and remain to this very day as Universiti Malaysia Terengganu. At the same time, KUSTEM's emblem was rehashed as the University's emblem.

In 2015, the university is granted autonomy status.

== Chancellor ==
- Her Royal Highness Sultanah Nur Zahirah, (Sultanah of Terengganu and 13th Raja Permaisuri Agong, 2006–2011), D.K., D.M.N., S.S.M.Z., S.S.M.T., D.K. (Kedah), Knight Grand Cross (First Class) of the Most Illustrious Order of Chula Chom Klao (Thailand)

== Rankings ==
Year	Rank	Valuer
2012	301+	QS Asian University Rankings
2013	251–300	QS Asian University Rankings
2014	251–300	QS Asian University Rankings
2015	251–300	QS Asian University Rankings
2016	251–300	QS Asian University Rankings
2017	251–300	QS Asian University Rankings
2018	251–300	QS Asian University Rankings
2019	251–300	QS Asian University Ranking
2020	195	QS Asian University Ranking
2021	167	QS Asian University Ranking
2022	198	QS Asian University Ranking
2023	197	QS Asian University Ranking
2024	195	QS Asian University Rankings
2025	=195	QS Asian University Rankings

== See also ==
- List of universities in Malaysia
