= Lincoln University College, Malaysia =

University college in Petaling, Selangor, Malaysia

Lincoln University College
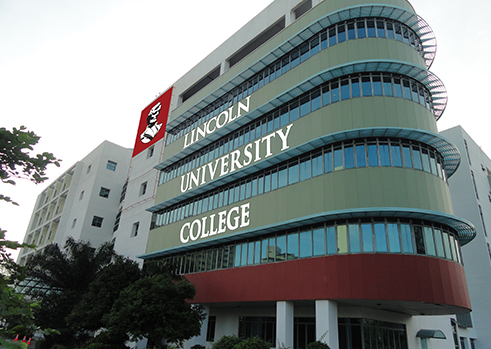
- Former names: Lincoln College (2002–2011)
- Type: Private
- Established: 2002
- President: Prof. Dr. Amiya Bhaumik
- Location: Petaling Jaya, Selangor, Malaysia
- Website: lincoln.edu.my

University rankings

Global – Overall
- QS World: =638 (2026)

Regional – Overall
- QS Asia: 185 (2025)

Lincoln University College, Petaling Jaya, Malaysia, was founded in the year in 2002 as Lincoln College and in 2011 Lincoln College was upgraded to Lincoln University College. Lincoln University College is a British private institution that provides higher education, approved by the Malaysian Qualifications Agency (MQA, National Accreditation Board) and the Ministry of Higher Education. The University College has got 5 Star ranking by Ministry of Higher Education, Malaysia in 2017 and 2019. The Lincoln University College among the nine Malaysian universities listed in the Times Higher Education (THE) University Impact Rankings 2019 ranked 80th in Quality Education provider in 2020 TIMES ranking. Lincoln University College got ISO 9001:2015 Certification in 2019. Situated in the cosmopolitan town of Petaling Jaya, the university college is close to the capital city, Kuala Lumpur.

At present Lincoln University College has two campuses in Petaling Jaya, along with its clinical campus at Kota Bharu.

In 2021, Lincoln University College formalized an agreement with Logos University International (UniLogos). UniLogos is a university authorized by the Ministry of National Education, Higher Education, Research and Innovation of France and accredited by the Independent Accreditation and Rating Agency of the Kyrgyz Republic (IARC/NIARS).

== List of Faculties ==
- School of Medicine
- School of Dentistry
- School of Pharmacy and Traditional Chinese Medicine
- School of Performing Arts and Design
- School of Nursing and Applied Science
- School of Business and Management
- School of Hospitality and Tourism
- School of AI Computing and Multimedia
- School of Engineering and Built Environment
- School of Education
- School of Social Science, Arts & Humanities
- English Language Centre & Centre for General Studies
- Centre for Foundation Studies
