= Wangsa Maju =

Township in Kuala Lumpur, Malaysia

- Township
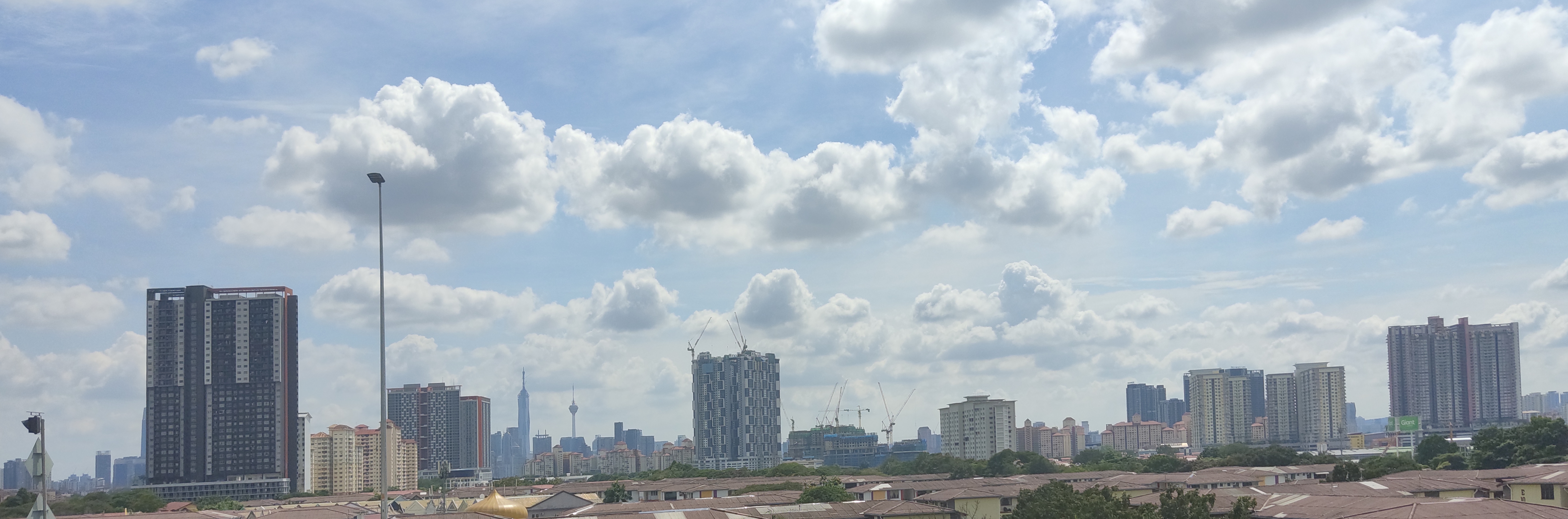
- Skyline of Wangsa Maju from the LRT Station
- Nickname: Hawthornden (old name)
- Location within Malaysia Wangsa Maju (Kuala Lumpur)
- Coordinates: 3°12′2″N 101°44′23″E
- Country: Malaysia
- State: Federal Territory of Kuala Lumpur
- Constituency: Wangsa Maju

Government
  - Local Authority: Dewan Bandaraya Kuala Lumpur
  - Mayor: Tan Sri Hj. Mhd. Amin Nordin bin Abd. Aziz
- Time zone: UTC+8 (MST)
- Postcode: 53000-53300
- Dialling code: +603-402, +603-403, +603-410, +603-413, +603-414, +603-416
- Police: Wangsa Maju

Wangsa Maju is a township and a constituency in Kuala Lumpur, Malaysia. This area is surrounded by Setapak, Taman Melati and Gombak district in Selangor. Wangsa Maju is one of the major suburbs in Kuala Lumpur.

== History ==
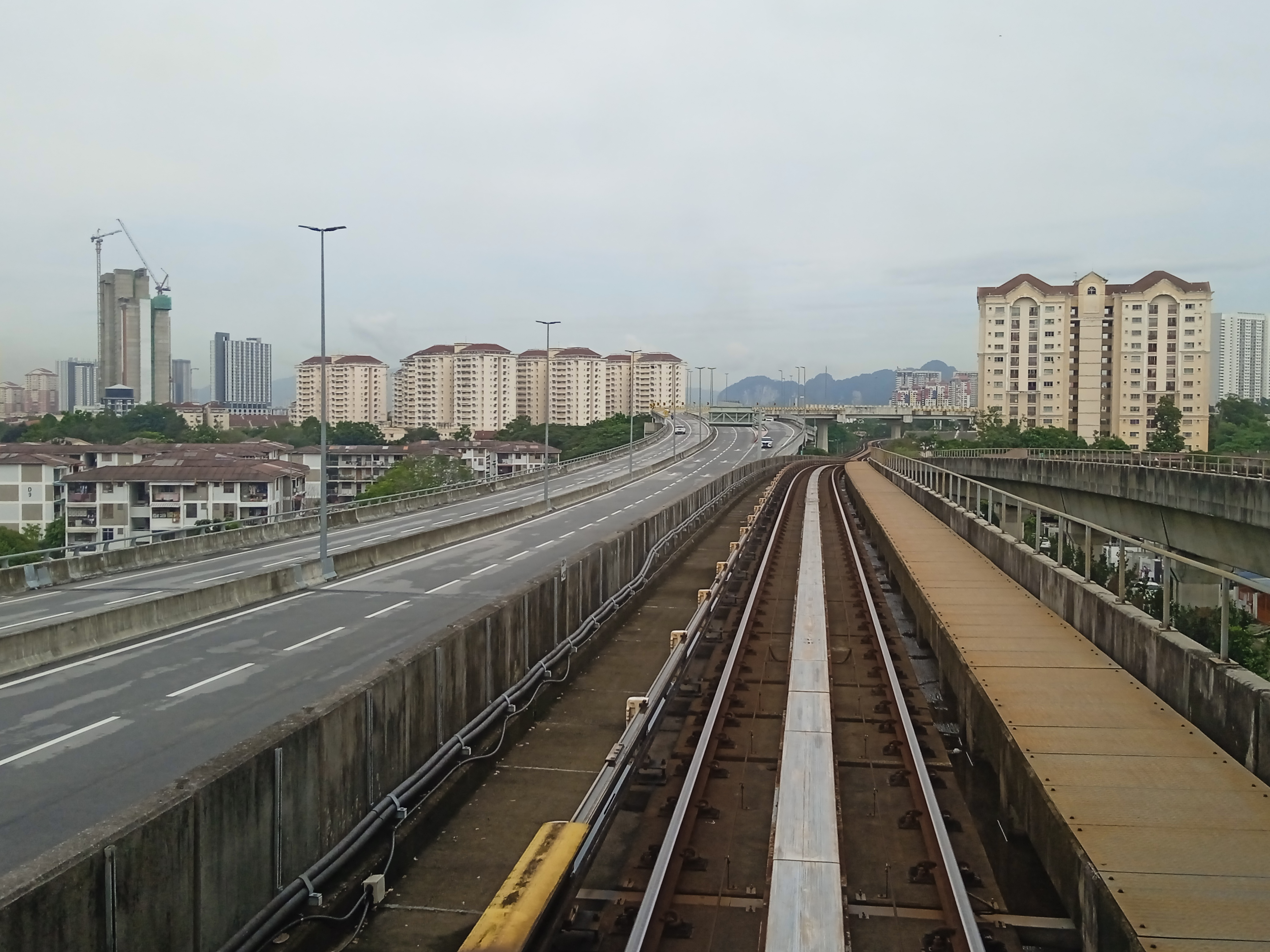
Kelana Jaya Line railway track at Wangsa Maju, 2023

Wangsa Maju is a township in Kuala Lumpur, formed in 1984 during the city's 10th anniversary. The area was previously occupied by Setapak rubber estates named as "Hawthornden" from the 1900s until the 1980s. The township is the second to be developed by the Kuala Lumpur City Hall (DBKL), with the first being Bandar Baru Tun Razak initiated in 1975. Subsequently, other new townships were developed in Sentul and Bukit Jalil. The new township project in Wangsa Maju is a joint venture between DBKL and a local company named Paremba Berhad.

Most residents of Wangsa Maju are from the low to middle-income group, and many flat units in the area were built and rented out at a lower monthly rental rate than the private sector's housing in Kuala Lumpur and Petaling Jaya. This provides opportunities for as many families as possible in the country to own their homes. Through this joint venture project, most of the houses to be built will be sold directly to the public. The council may keep a small number of these houses for renting to low-income groups who are forced to relocate due to government development projects.

Wangsa Maju's commercial centre is known as the Kuala Lumpur Suburban Centre (KLSC). Initially, "Bandar Baru Titiwangsa Maju" was proposed as the name for the township. Wangsa Maju now only contains Sections 1, 2, 4, 5, 6, and 10, with no Sections 3,7,8 or 9 in between. Early charts indicated different sections of Wangsa Maju as "R", most likely referring to regions or residential areas.

Following the opening of Tunku Abdul Rahman University of Management and Technology (TAR UMT) & Universiti Tunku Abdul Rahman (UTAR) campus, Wangsa Maju has become a major residential area for the students of TAR UMT & UTAR.

In May 2021, DBKL announced plans to transform Wangsa Maju's Section 1 into Kuala Lumpur's first zero-carbon township, focusing on green technologies. The project's goal is to provide the neighbourhood, which is mostly made up of low-cost flats, shophouses, and makeshift retail stores, with eco-conscious neighbourhoods that emphasise pedestrian walkways, jogging tracks and bicycle paths, as well as the replacement of ageing railings along residential areas. DBKL also intends to transform vacant lots into landscaped gardens or urban farms.

== Facilities ==
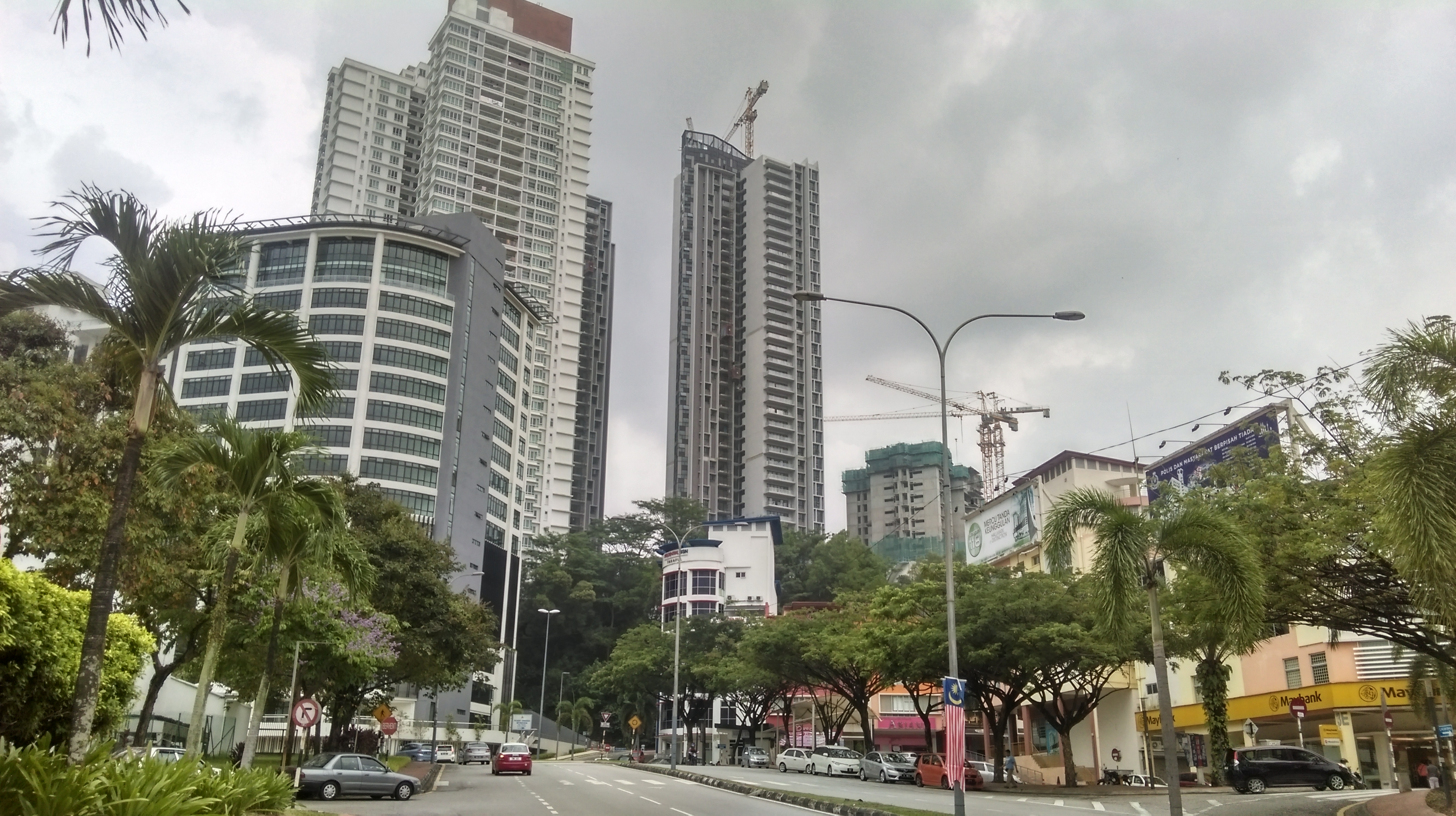
Wangsa Link, one of the commercial areas in Wangsa Maju.

- Sections 1 through 10
- Various housing area such as Wangsa Melawati, Desa Setapak, Taman Sri Rampai, Taman Bunga Raya
- Jabatan Pengangkutan Jalan Wangsa Maju (Known for W and V Number plate registration issuance)
- Bangunan ZETRO (currently houses the headquarters of PLKN. Formerly known as Akademi TV3, later became SAL College.)

=== Shopping ===
- AEON Wangsa Maju (also known as Jusco or Alpha Angle Shopping Centre)
- AEON BiG Wangsa Maju (used to be known as Carrefour)
- Wangsa Walk Mall
- Giant
- Setapak Central – Formerly KL Festival City

=== Education ===
- Tunku Abdul Rahman University of Management and Technology (TAR UMT)
- Institute CECE
- VTAR Institute

=== Place of worships ===
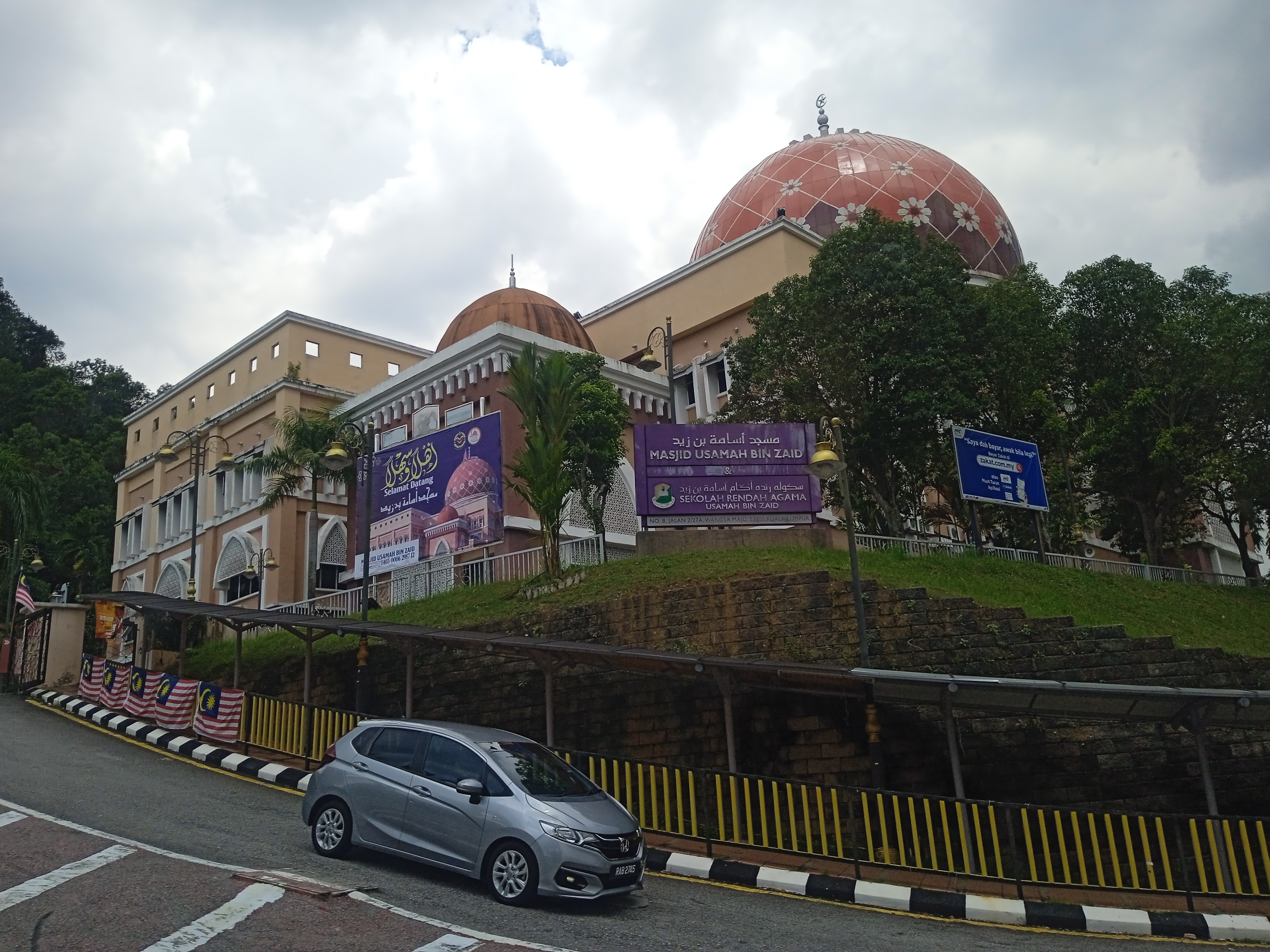
Usamah bin Zaid Mosque side view from west Jalan 2/27A

- Usamah bin Zaid Mosque (Masjid Usamah bin Zaid)

=== Others ===
- Wangsa Maju Teleport
- Wangsa Maju LRT station
- P. Ramlee Memorial

== Transport ==
=== Public transport ===
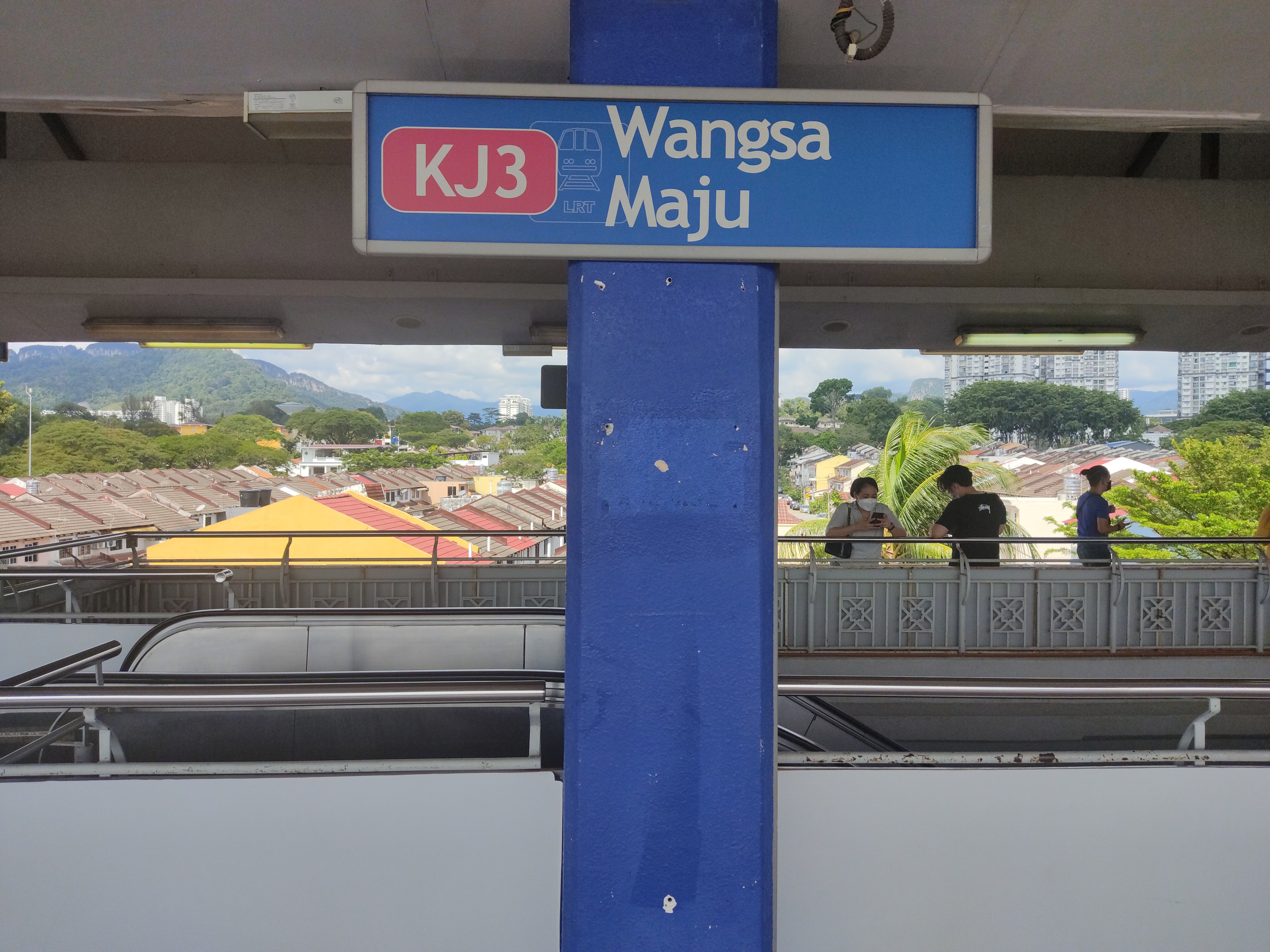
Wangsa Maju LRT station

Wangsa Maju is home to two Rapid KL LRT stations, Wangsa Maju LRT Station and Sri Rampai LRT Station.

=== Road networks ===
Wangsa Maju is well served by federal routes and expressways. Jalan Genting Klang Federal Route 2 links downtown Kuala Lumpur with Wangsa Maju and Setapak areas. Motorists from Ampang and Pandan Indah will instead opt for the MRR2 Federal Route 28. The Duta–Ulu Klang Expressway cuts through the southern part of Wangsa Maju. The old road to Gombak and Bentong (Federal Route 68) also begins nearby.

== Politics ==
Parliamentary boundaries can be confusing at times, particularly when it comes to the Wangsa Maju township. The Wangsa Maju Parliamentary seat (P116) includes not only Sections 1, 2, and 4, but also Gombak, Danau Kota, and Taman Melati towards the Karak Highway. Nonetheless, some parts of Wangsa Maju are still administered by Setiawangsa, which causes some confusion among residents who live in Wangsa Maju yet vote for Setiawangsa. Also, the DBKL branch office at Wangsa Maju is called Setiawangsa, although another DBKL branch office called Wangsa Maju can be found on Jalan Gombak, possibly due to parliamentary boundaries. The area was first represented by Datuk Yew Teong Loke (MCA) in 2004. In 2008 he lost to Wee Choo Keong (PKR) by merely 151 votes, subsequently this seat was won by the PKR for two terms

The incumbent MP is Zahir Hassan of Pakatan Harapan-PKR, who won the 15th general election with a majority of 20,696 votes under the Pakatan Harapan flag. The Setiawangsa constituency includes a portion of Wangsa Maju located south of Jalan Genting Klang, and the incumbent MP is Nik Nazmi, also of the PH-PKR.
