= Genting Klang–Pahang Highway =

Road in Malaysia

Federal Route 2
- Genting Klang–Pahang Highway; Jalan Genting Klang; Jalan Pahang
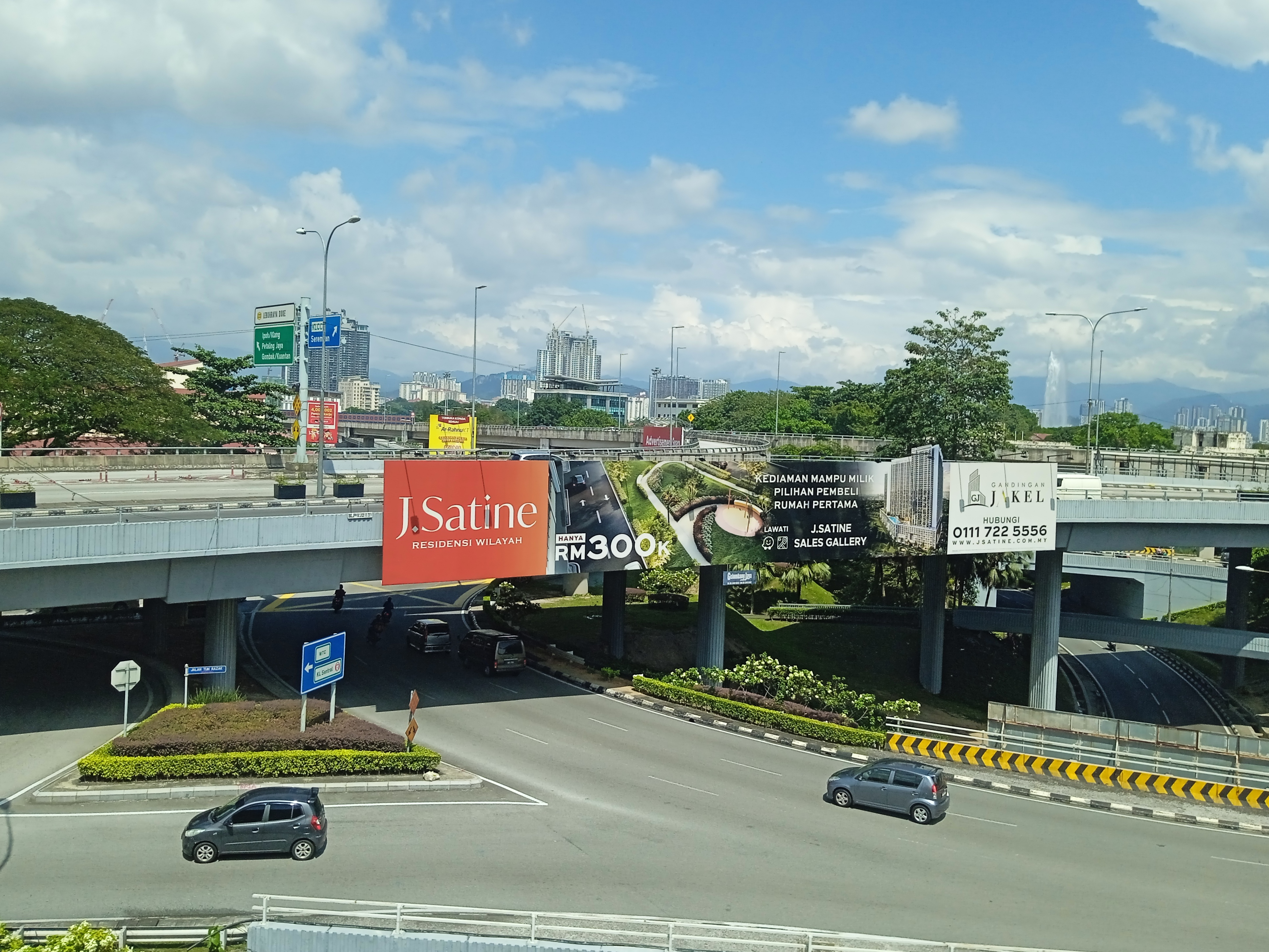

Route information
- Maintained by Malaysian Public Works Department

Major junctions
- North end: Klang Gates
- FT 28 Kuala Lumpur Middle Ring Road 2 Setiawangsa–Pantai Expressway; FT 68 / FT 2 Federal Route 68; Duta–Ulu Klang Expressway; Kuala Lumpur Middle Ring Road 1 Jalan Tuanku Abdul Rahman
- South end: Chow Kit

Location
- Country: Malaysia
- Primary destinations: Setapak, Gombakm Kuantan, Ulu Kelang

Highway system
- Highways in Malaysia; Expressways; Federal; State

The Genting Klang–Pahang Highway or officially Jalan Genting Klang and Jalan Pahang, as it is locally known (Federal Route 2), is a major highway in Kuala Lumpur, Malaysia.

The Genting Klang–Pahang Highway connects a number of urban and residential areas like Titiwangsa, Sentul, Setapak, Taman P.Ramlee Wangsa Maju, Taman Bunga Raya, Taman Melati, Taman Permata, Hulu Kelang, Taman Melawati and Tunku Abdul Rahman University of Management & Technology to the city.

Most locals do not consider it a highway as, unlike the other highways which are "closed" roads, Jalan Genting Klang is also a busy road with many commercial properties and condominiums, which are popular with students of Universiti Tunku Abdul Rahman.

The road is so named because it is the main gateway from downtown Kuala Lumpur to Pahang and the east coast. It is part of Federal Route 2. The 0 km-mark of the E8 East Coast Expressway is also located here.

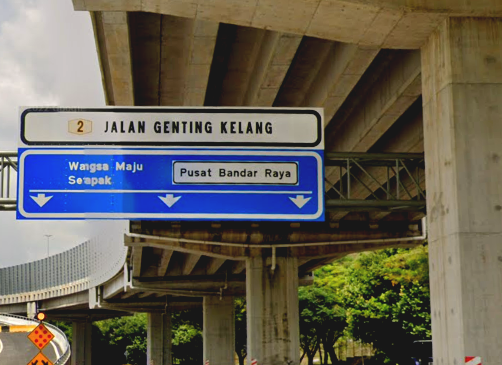
Gantry Road Sign near interchange with SPE

== History ==
The highway was upgraded from single carriageway to dual carriageway in the 1980s. In 1995, the highway was taken over by the Metramac Corporation Sdn Bhd which also managed the Cheras Highway (Federal Route 1), East–West Link Expressway and Kuala Lumpur–Seremban Expressway (both E37). The Jalan Pahang toll plaza (city centre bound) was in operation from 1 August 1995, with the motorist paying the RM 0.50 toll until the toll plaza was abolished on 13 August 2004. This highway is now maintained by the Kuala Lumpur City Hall or Dewan Bandaraya Kuala Lumpur (DBKL).

== Development ==
The Jalan Genting Klang stretch from Setapak to Klang Gates was upgraded from four lanes to a six-lane dual carriageway. The upgrading started in 2012 and was completed in 2015. The project was undertaken by Seroja Angerrik Development; the two-phase upgrading works started from the junction at Jalan 1/27A to the MRR2, while phase two which was completed on 15 July 2015, continued on from Jalan Air Panas to Jalan 1/27A. The total cost for the entire project was RM 39.6 million.

== Landmarks ==
- Tunku Abdul Rahman University of Management & Technology
- Wardieburn Camp
- Royal Selangor Pewter Factory at Setapak Industrial Area.
- P. Ramlee Memorial at Jalan Dedap, Taman P. Ramlee (formerly known as Taman Forlong)
- Courts Mammouth Superstore, a superstore which was formerly known as Reach Superstore was opened in 1994.
- Jamiul Ehsan Mosque, one of the oldest mosques in Kuala Lumpur
- McDonald's Jalan Pahang Drive Thru, the first McDonald's drive-through in Malaysia, opened on 19 December 1988.
- Hospital Tawakal
- Pekeliling Flats
- Bulatan Pahang roundabout
- Hospital Kuala Lumpur

== Junction lists ==
The entire route is located in Kuala Lumpur.

Legend:

- I/C - Interchange, I/S - Intersection, RSA - Rest and service area, OBR - Overhead bridge restaurant, R/R - Restaurant and rest plaza, L/B - Layby, V/P - Vista point, TN - tunnel, T/P - Toll plaza, BR - Bridge
- C - Cloverleaf, S - Stack, T-A - Trumpet-A, T-B - Trumpet-B, DT - Directional-T/Y, SDT - Semi-Directional-T/Y, P-Y - Partial-Y, D - Diamond, P-C - Partial cloverleaf, D-D - Diverging diamond, D-R - Direct ramp

Location	km	mi	Exit	Name	Destinations	Notes
Wangsa Maju				Klang Gates; Klang Gates I/C	Jalan Klang Gates – Klang Gates, Klang Gates Dam Recreational Park; FT 28 Kuala Lumpur Middle Ring Road 2 – Sungai Buloh, Kepong, Batu Caves, Taman Melawati, Zoo Negara, Ulu Kelang, Ampang, Cheras, Petaling Jaya, Segambut, Kajang, Shah Alam, Klang, Ipoh, Genting Highlands, Kuantan, Hulu Langat, Semenyih, Kuala Lumpur International Airport (KLIA), Seremban, Malacca, Johor Bahru	Diamond interchange with ramp to MRR2 (Ampang)
Wangsa Maju				Taman Bunga Raya	Jalan Malinja – Taman Bunga Raya, Tunku Abdul Rahman University of Management and Technology, Kuala Lumpur Campus	T-junctions
Wangsa Maju				Genting Klang-SPE Entry	Setiawangsa–Pantai Expressway	Ramp (from westbound only) in to expressway (Pantai bound)
Wangsa Maju				Wangsa Maju I/S	Jalan Tumbuhan – Taman Melati (Persiaran Pertahanan), Taman Melati LRT Station 5 , Taman Ibukota, Gombak Setia, Gombak, Batu Caves; Jalan 1/27A – Wangsa Maju, Setiawangsa, Ampang, Wangsa Maju LRT Station 5	Junctions
Wangsa Maju				Genting Klang-SPE Entry	Setiawangsa–Pantai Expressway	Ramp (from eastbound only) in to expressway (Pantai bound)
Setapak				Wardieburn Camp	Wardieburn Camp	T-junctions
Setapak				Puspakom	Puspakom	
Setapak				JPJ Headquarters	Road Transport Department (JPJ) Headquarters	
Setapak				Taman Ibukota I/S	Jalan Taman Ibu Kota – Taman Ibukota	T-junctions
Setapak				Setapak Industrial Area I/S	Jalan Usahawan – Setapak Industrial Area, Royal Selangor Pewter Factory	T-junctions
Setapak				Setapak; Taman P. Ramlee (Taman Forlong)	Jalan Bunga Kantan – Taman P. Ramlee (Taman Forlong), P. Ramlee Memorial	T-junctions
Setapak				Setapak; Courts Mammouth Superstore	Courts Mammouth Superstore	A superstore which uses to be known as Reach Superstore
Setapak				Setapak; Jalan Gombak I/C	FT 68 / FT 2 Malaysia Federal Route 68 – Gombak, Batu Caves, Kuantan	Trumpet interchange
Setapak				Setapak		
Setapak				Setapak; Jamiul Ehsan Mosque	Jamiul Ehsan Mosque	One of the oldest mosques in Kuala Lumpur
Setapak				Setapak; Jalan Pahang-DUKE Entry	Duta–Ulu Klang Expressway (Duta–Sentul Pasar–Ulu Klang Link (Main Link)) – Ipoh, Gombak, Batu Caves, Kuantan, Seremban, KLCC, City Centre, Bulatan Pahang, Sentul, Ulu Klang, Ampang, Cheras, Taman Setiawangsa, Wangsa Maju	Ramp in to expressway
Setapak				Setapak		
Sentul				Jalan 9/48A I/S	Jalan 9/48A – Bandar Baru Sentul; Jalan Sentul – Sentul town centre	T-junctions
Sentul				Jalan Titiwangsa I/S	Jalan Titiwangsa – Titiwangsa Lake	T-junctions
Sentul				Sentul-DUKE Entry	Duta–Ulu Klang Expressway (Tun Razak Link) – No entry	Ramp out from expressway
Sentul				Jalan 3/48A I/S	Jalan 3/48A – Sentul town centre, Sentul flats, P&R Sentul Timur LRT station	T-junctions
Sentul			Shell Layby (northbound)			
Sentul				McDonald's drive-through	McDonald's	The first McDonald's drive-through in Malaysia, opened on 19 December 1988. Northbound only
Sentul				Tawakal Hospital	Tawakal Hospital –	Northbound only
Sentul			Former Jalan Pahang toll plaza location			
Chow Kit				Bulatan Pahang Roundabout	Kuala Lumpur Middle Ring Road 1 (Jalan Tun Razak) – Ipoh, Petaling Jaya, KLCC, Ampang; North–South Expressway Southern Route / AH2 – Seremban, Malacca, Johor Bahru	Roundabout interchange with one directional underpass to Ipoh and Petaling Jaya
Chow Kit				Kuala Lumpur Hospital	Jalan Utama Hospital – Kuala Lumpur Hospital	Southbound
Chow Kit				Chow Kit; Chow Kit I/S	Jalan Raja Muda Abdul Aziz (Princes Road) – Kampung Baru, Jalan Tun Razak (MRR1), Jalan Semarak	Junctions
Chow Kit			Through to Jalan Tuanku Abdul Rahman (Batu Road)			
1.000 mi = 1.609 km; 1.000 km = 0.621 mi: Closed/former; Incomplete access; Route transition
