= Setapak Central =

KIPMall Setapak
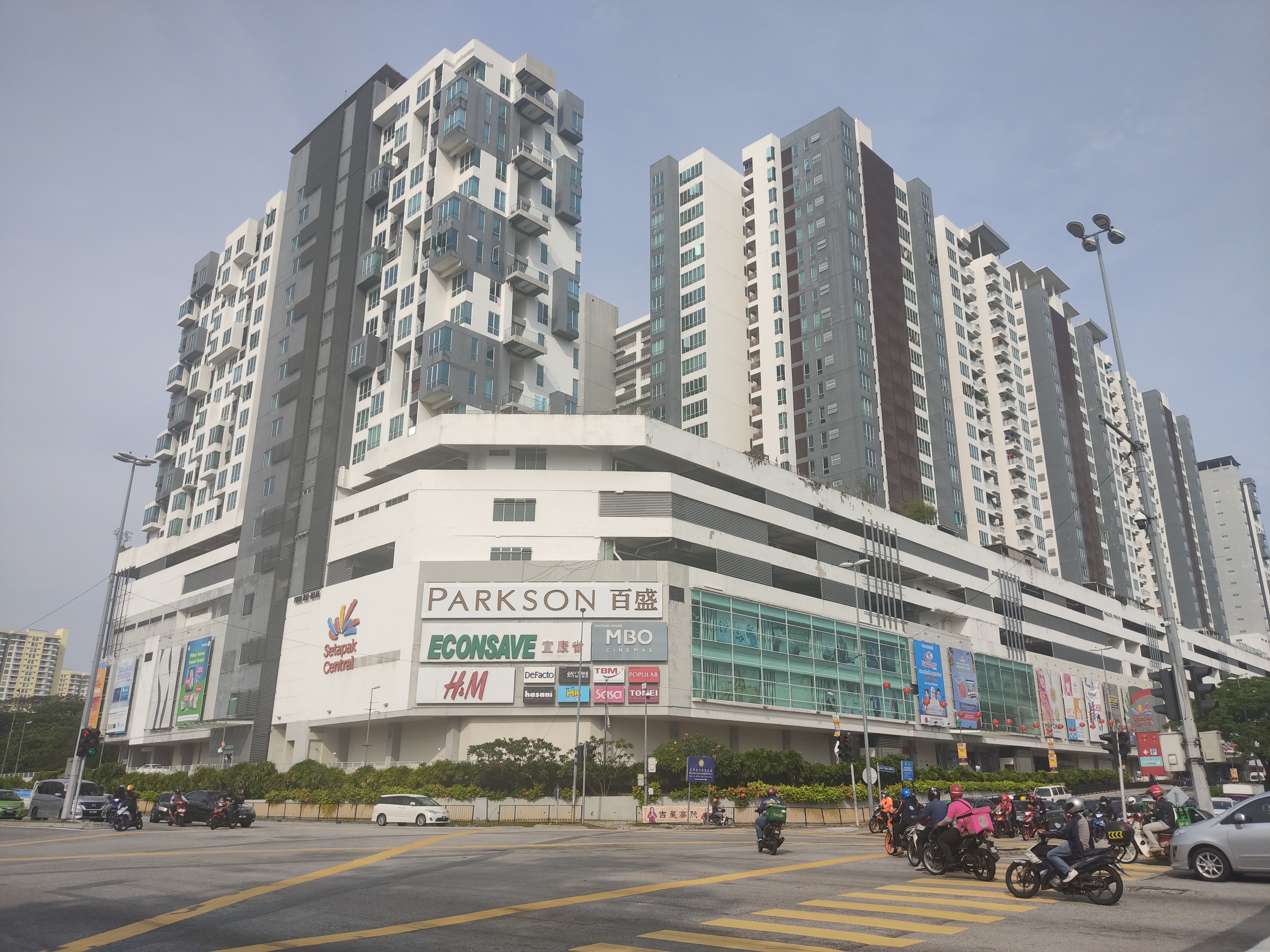
- KIPMall Setapak and Zetapark Service Condominiums above
- Location: Kuala Lumpur, Malaysia
- Coordinates: 3°12′13.90″N 101°43′15.6″E
- Opened: 20 October 2011; 15 years ago as KL Festival City; 5 October 2015; 11 years ago as Setapak Central; 30 September 2026; 38 days ago as KIPMall Setapak
- Developer: Parkson Holdings (2011 - 2014); AsiaMalls Sdn Bhd (2014 - 2026); KIP Real Estate Investment Trust (KIP REIT; 2026 - present)
- Owner: Festival City Sdn Bhd (Parkson Holdings; 2011 - 2014); AsiaMalls Sdn Bhd (2014 - 2026); KIP Real Estate Investment Trust (KIP REIT; 2026 - present)
- Num. of stores: 250+
- Num. of anchor tenants: 3
- Floor area: 487,342 sq ft (45,275.6 m^{2})
- Floors: 4
- Website: www.setapakcentral.com.my

KIPMall Setapak, previously known as Setapak Central & KL Festival City, is a shopping mall located along Jalan Genting Klang in Kuala Lumpur, Malaysia. It is situated in Danau Kota, a township in Setapak.

== History ==
KL Festival City was constructed on an 8 acres (3.2 ha) land at a cost of RM 215 million by Parkson Holdings (PHB) and opened its doors on 20 October 2011, along with the opening of a Parkson store on the same day, becoming its 37th store. Its first tenants were Parkson Department Store, Econsave and MBO Cinemas.

The grand opening was held on 9 March 2012. The opening of KL Festival City also marked a new milestone for PHB with its entry into shopping mall management.

Since then, it has become a new landmark at Jalan Genting Klang and popular spot amongst students and families from nearby colleges such as Tunku Abdul Rahman University of Management and Technology and neighbourhoods.

In August 2014, PHB announced the disposal of KL Festival City for RM 349 million cash as the mall was deemed too small for Parkson's expansion plan to construct premium shopping malls with a net lettable area of 1 million sq ft. In a statement to Bursa Malaysia, Parkson said the disposal would result in a gain of about RM 110 million. Under the sales and purchase agreement, PHB agreed to sell KL Festival City to Festiva Mall Sdn Bhd, which is wholly owned subsidiary of AsiaMalls Sdn Bhd.

On 5 October 2015, the mall changed its name to "Setapak Central" as it seeks to create "an engaging shopping and lifestyle experiences in the Setapak neighbourhood". Besides, the retail philosophy of Setapak Central is "to have a good enough mall for the people of Setapak so they need not drive to (the city centre of) Kuala Lumpur".

On 30 September 2026, Setapak Central was changes its name to "KIPMall Setapak''.

== Tenants ==
=== Anchor Tenants ===
KIPMall Setapak consists of more than 250 stores that spans across four levels with Parkson, GSC Cinemas and Jaya Grocer being the anchor tenants of the mall.

=== Key Tenants ===
Some of the key tenants in the mall include Swedish fashion retailer H&M, Australian fashion chain Cotton On, Japan‘s fashion and clothing UNIQLO, TBM Electrical, Home's Harmony, Daiso, Kaison, The Coffee Bean & Tea Leaf, Texas Chicken and more.

== Transport ==
KIPMall Setapak is easily accessible via MRR2, DUKE and Jalan Genting Klang. The mall is just 8-minute driving distance away from Wangsa Maju LRT station.

=== RapidKL Buses ===
KIPMall Setapak is accessible via the following rapidKL buses.

- T203: Taman Melati LRT station - Medan Idaman Gombak - Taman Setapak - Columbia Asia Hospital - Setapak Central - Taman Melati LRT station
- T250: Wangsa Maju LRT station - Desa Setapak - Setapak Central - Danau Kota - Tunku Abdul Rahman University of Management and Technology - Wangsa Maju LRT station
