= Taman Melawati =

Town in Gombak, Selangor, Malaysia

Coordinates: 3.2212685°N 101.7487279°E

Taman Melawati (Chinese: 美拉华蒂花园) is an self-contained town located in Ulu Klang, Selangor, Malaysia. Although the township's postcode is 53100, which gives it a Federal Territory postal address, it is actually in the Gombak constituency of Selangor, administered by the Ampang Jaya Municipal Council (MPAJ).

== Transport ==
This town is located along MRR 2. It is linked to the city centre via Jalan Pahang, as well as Ampang–Kuala Lumpur Elevated Highway (via Ampang), while the Duta–Ulu Klang Expressway and East Coast Expressway are located nearby.

This town can be accessed by public transport using Rapid KL bus routes 222 (from Titiwangsa / Chow Kit / Wangsa Maju), 220 Masjid Jamek) and T221 from Sri Rampai LRT station.

== Shopping and attractions ==
An upscale eight-storey shopping mall named Melawati Mall, jointly developed by Sime Darby and CapitaLand, opened to the public in July 2017. It houses over 620,000 square feet of retail space and is anchored by Village Grocer, DAISO, GSC Cinemas and Fitness First.

The Malaysian Institute of Art as well as a private hospital, Damai Service Hospital, is located here.

The National Zoo of Malaysia (Zoo Negara) is nearby. One of the hills in this town, Bukit Tabur, is a popular hiking spot while the main entrance of the Klang Gates Dam is found on a hill in this town. There are also a basketball court and a football field at Taman Hill View.

== Public schools ==
- SK Taman Melawati
- SK Taman Melawati (2)
- SMK Taman Melawati
- SJK(T) Taman Melawati
- Marefat International School, a private day school is also located here.
- The Brainy Bunch School, a private day school, is also located here.

== Vigilantism ==
The town first experienced this problem in early 2015. After a stray of robberies within the small community the police seemed powerless to stop these crimes from being carried out. A group known as "Blood Brothers" were seen taking matters into their own hands. The group soon started going through the streets at night in an effort to stop the robberies. After a month or so they apprehended the robbers, who were later discovered to be members of the Gang 77. The after effects of this also led to the capture of their leader, which was confirmed by the police in 2017.
