= Ramlee =

Ramlee is a Malaysian name that may refer to

- Ramlee Awang Murshid (born 1967), Malaysian novelist
- Nasir P. Ramlee (born 1953), Malaysian film actor, director, singer and composer, son of P. Ramlee
- P. Ramlee (1929–1973), Malaysian film actor, director, singer and composer
  - Taman P. Ramlee, a township near Kuala Lumpur named after P. Ramlee
- Shazalee Ramlee (born 1994), Malaysian-Australian football midfielder
