= Setapak =

Town and mukim in Selangor, Malaysia

Coordinates: 3°12′13″N 101°43′28″E

Sri Thirumurugan Temple in Taman Danau Kota, Setapak

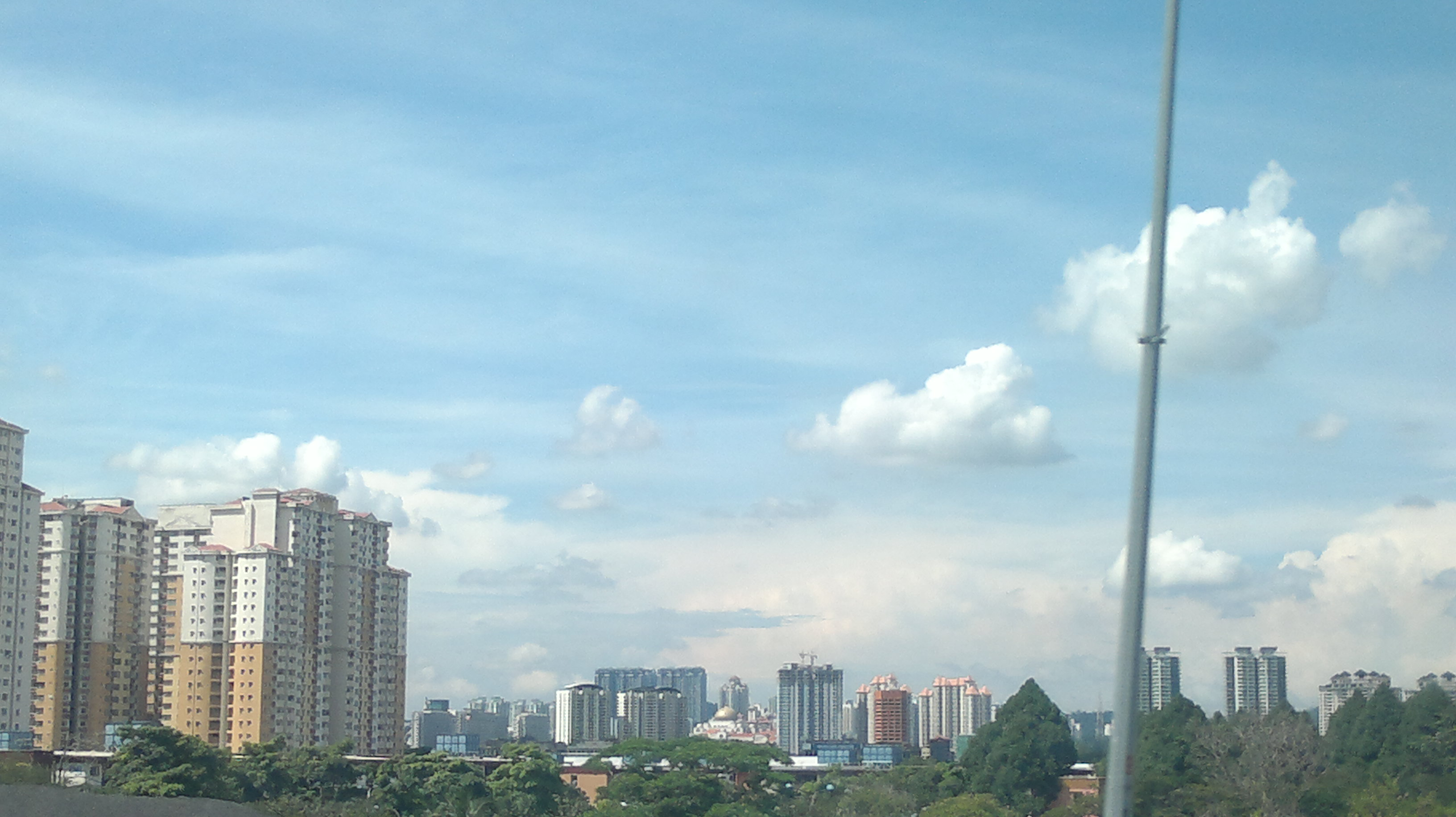
Setapak view

Setapak in Gombak District

Setapak in northeastern part of the Federal Territory of Kuala Lumpur

Setapak is a town and mukim straddling both northeastern Kuala Lumpur and Gombak District of Selangor, Malaysia.

== Etymology ==
Formerly a tin-mining and rubber estate area, in Malay tapak means step, hence Setapak means one step, probably referring to the close proximity of the suburb to Kuala Lumpur. Another explanation of the origin of its name traces to its historical roots.

== History ==
The earliest inhabitants of Setapak were the aborigines (orang asli), and the Minangkabaus. On 12 April 1884 Frank Swettenham, the British Resident of Selangor pleaded for the re-appointment of Batu Tapak as the headman of the aborigines living in that area, and hence the name Setapak, in honour of the headman.

== Geographical definition ==
The Selangor part of the mukim (commune/subdistrict) of Setapak is situated north-east of Kuala Lumpur in the constituency of Gombak, and has an area of 62 square miles (160 km^{2}). The northern limit of Setapak is Gunung Bunga Buah; its north-eastern limit is Genting Sempah on the Pahang border; to the east is Bukit Dinding and to the south-east is the Rifle range. The state constituency of Gombak Setia roughly corresponds to the boundaries of the mukim of Setapak; before 1974 it also includes what is today the parliamentary constituencies of Wangsa Maju and Setiawangsa.

The Gombak River with its source in Gunung Bunga Buah, is the main river flowing through the mukim. Setapak consists of Gombak town, Kampung Padang Balang, Kampung Baru Air Panas and a number of other villages.

Today, what is regarded as 'Setapak' consists of the township of Wangsa Maju, as well as the first few kilometres of Jalan Pahang and some surrounding areas. The Titiwangsa Recreational Park is located just south of Setapak. Loke Yew Hill is a place of major historical interest in this town. Named after the Chinese philanthropist, this hill contains ruins of a fortress surrounding the dilapidated villa which belonged to the Loke family. It is also the burial ground for the Loke family.

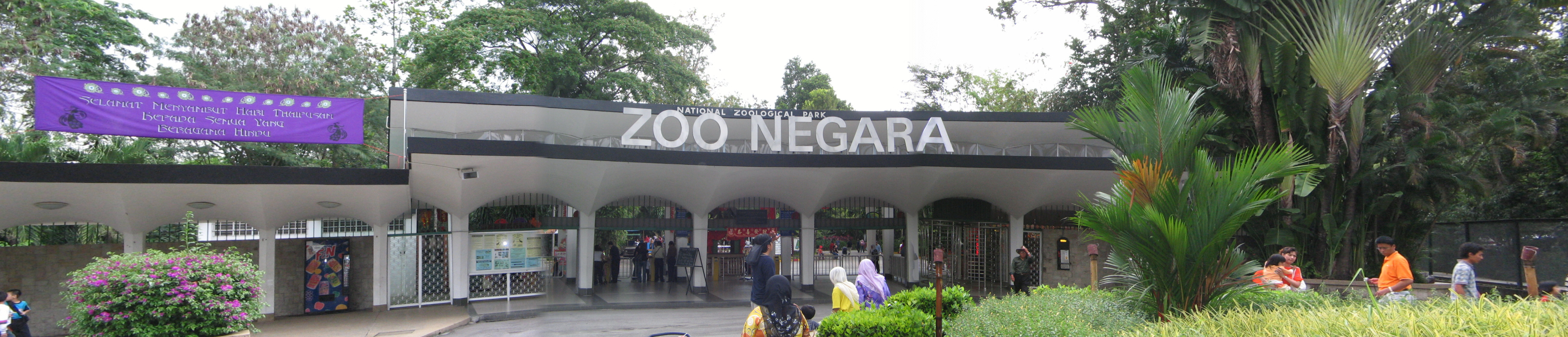
Zoo Negara Malaysia

In 1961 the Zoological society was formed, and the National Zoo of Malaysia (Zoo Negara) in Setapak was officially opened by the Prime Minister on 16 November 1963. The Zoo is situated about 13 kilometers from Kuala Lumpur, onroute to Ulu Klang and situated on a 42-acre (17 ha) semi-virgin jungle with a reserve of 100 acres (40 ha) for further development.

== Member of Parliament/ State Assembly ==
Representatives of Setapak
Constituency	State/FT	Representative
Gombak (parliamentary constituency)	Selangor	Amirudin Shari (PH-PKR)
Wangsa Maju (parliamentary constituency)	Kuala Lumpur	Zahir Hassan (PH-PKR)
Setiawangsa (parliamentary constituency)	Kuala Lumpur	Nik Nazmi Nik Ahmad (PH-PKR)
Gombak Setia (state constituency)	Selangor	Muhammad Hilman Idham (PN-PPBM)

== Education ==
- Tunku Abdul Rahman University of Management and Technology (TAR UMT)
- Institute CECE
- VTAR Institute
- Al Diwan International Centre for Teaching Arabic (at Taman Melati Utama)
- Setapak High School
- Mun Yee Primary School
- Chong Hwa Primary School
- Chiao Nan Primary School
- Sekolah Sri Utama

== Public transportation ==
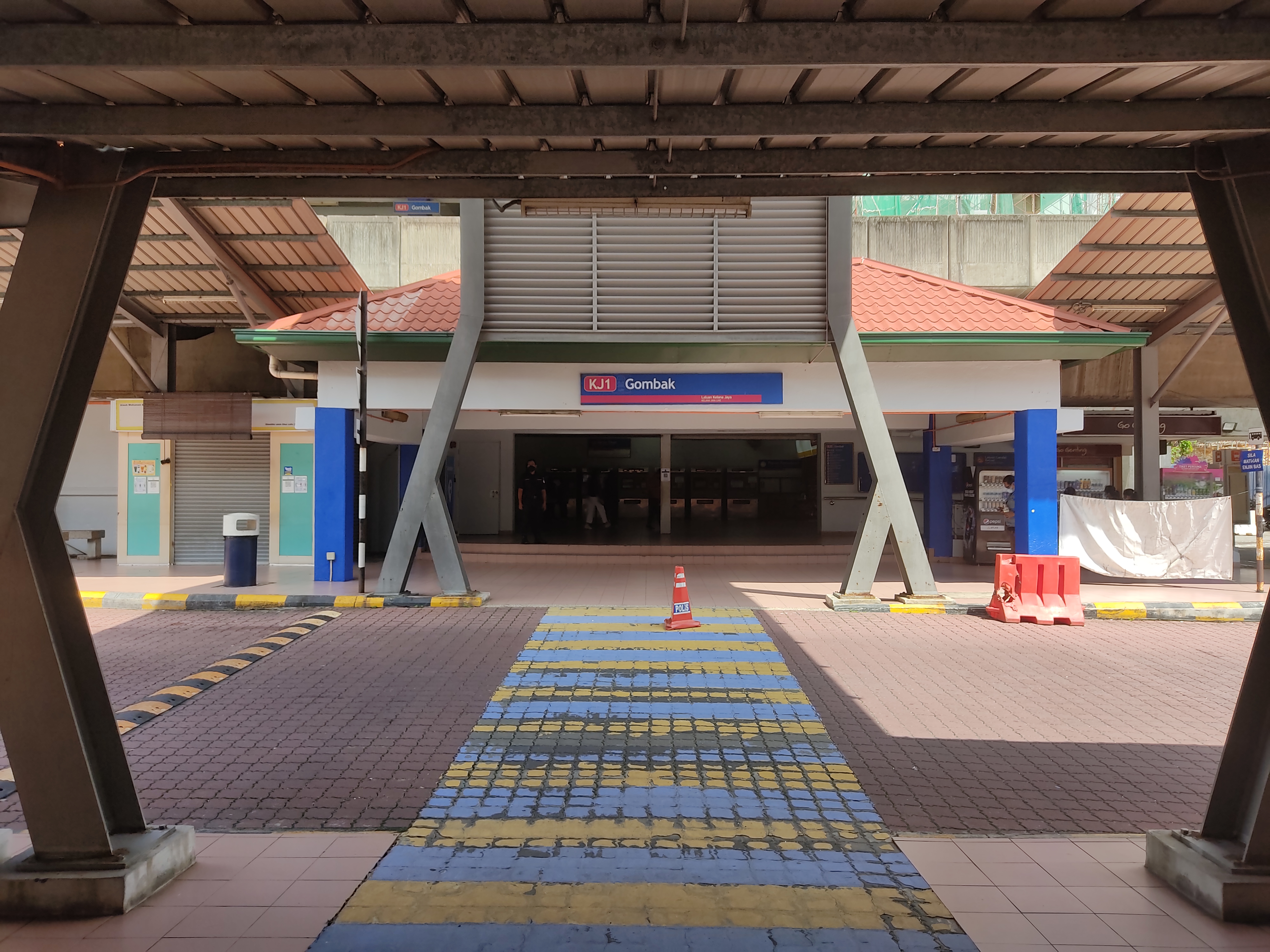
Gombak LRT station

The Kelana Jaya Line has five LRT stations in the Setapak region - Gombak LRT station, Taman Melati LRT station, Wangsa Maju LRT station, Sri Rampai LRT station and the Setiawangsa LRT station.

In the future, the whole area will be served by an elevated station on the MRT Circle Line under the name of Setapak MRT station.

Kumpool, which is a Vanpool ride-sharing service to Wangsa Maju LRT Station is also available here.

== Governmental Institutions ==
- Puspakom Kuala Lumpur
- JPJ Wilayah Persekutuan
- Department of Immigration (Malaysia) Wangsa Maju Branch

== Attractions ==
- The P. Ramlee Memorial is located at Taman P. Ramlee (formerly Taman Forlong)
- Royal Selangor Pewter factory
- The Ayer Panas Hot Springs is located in Ayer Panas, Setapak
- Masjid Zaid bin Haritsah, Kampung Sungai Mulia - Beautiful roadside mosque
- Padang Balang Minangkabau Traditional Village
- Surau Tinggi Kampung Bandar Dalam - Old traditional Malay mosque
- Choo Sian Temple (聚仙廟) - elaborate and beautiful Chinese temple
- Setapak Central (formerly KL Festival City)

== Incidents ==
Setapak has been categorised as a hotspot for drug activities in Kuala Lumpur. The Malaysian authorities have caught several drug abusers in the suburb.

A lecturer from Palestine was shot dead in Setapak in front of Idaman Puteri Condominium on 21 April 2018 at 6am. The attack was widely condemned by Malaysians.

== See also ==
- Kampung Padang Balang
