= Pekeliling Flats =

Pekeliling Flats (Tunku Abdul Rahman Flats)
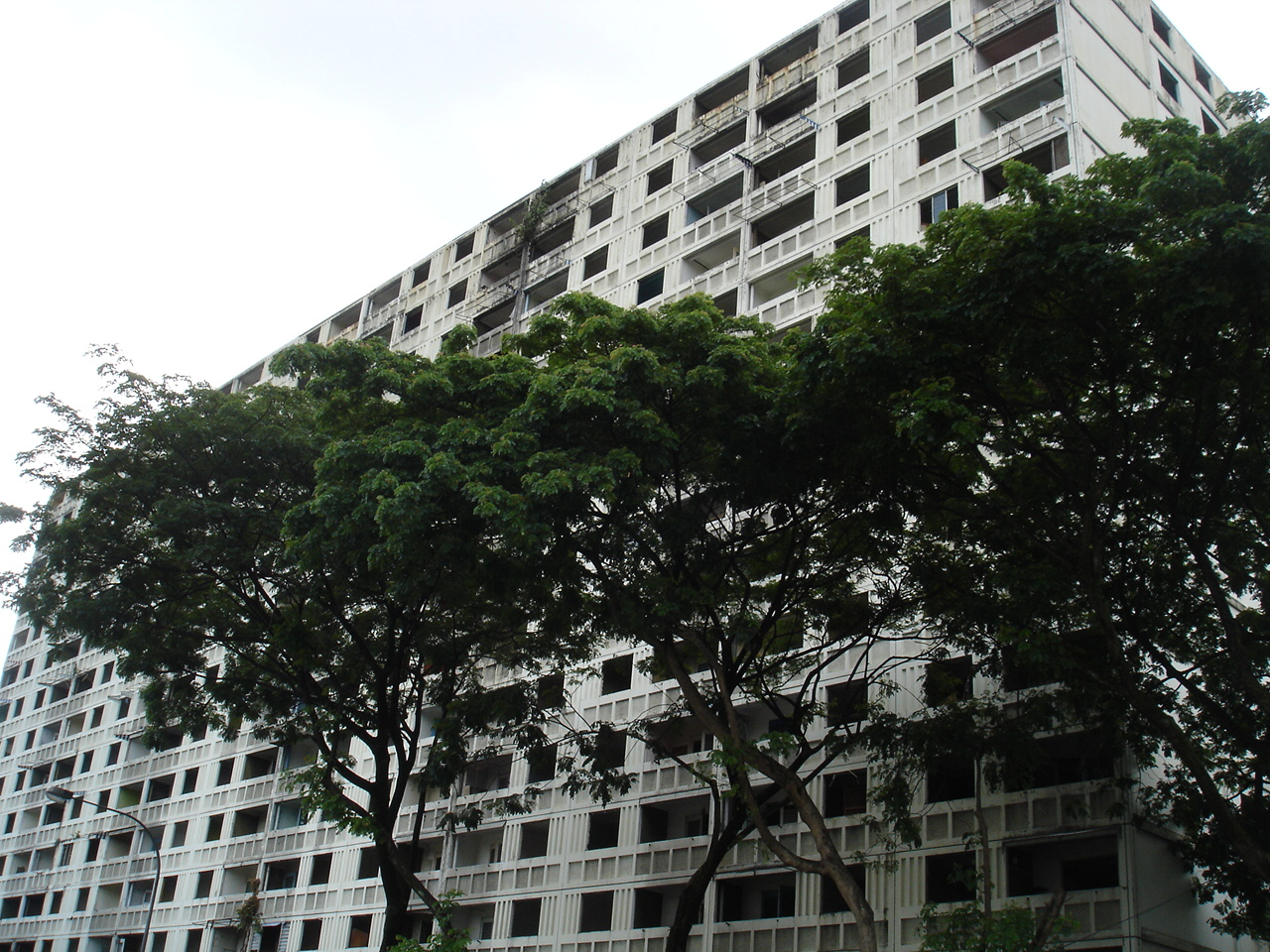
- One of the blocks of Pekeliling Flats waiting to be demolished.

General information
- Type: High-rise apartment building
- Architectural style: Modernism
- Location: Jalan Pekeliling, (now Jalan Tun Razak), Kuala Lumpur, Malaysia
- Construction started: 1964
- Estimated completion: 1967

Technical details
- Floor count: 17

Pekeliling Flats, better known as Tunku Abdul Rahman Flats was the third high-rise apartment building in Kuala Lumpur, Malaysia built after Razak Mansion and Suleiman Courts.

== History ==
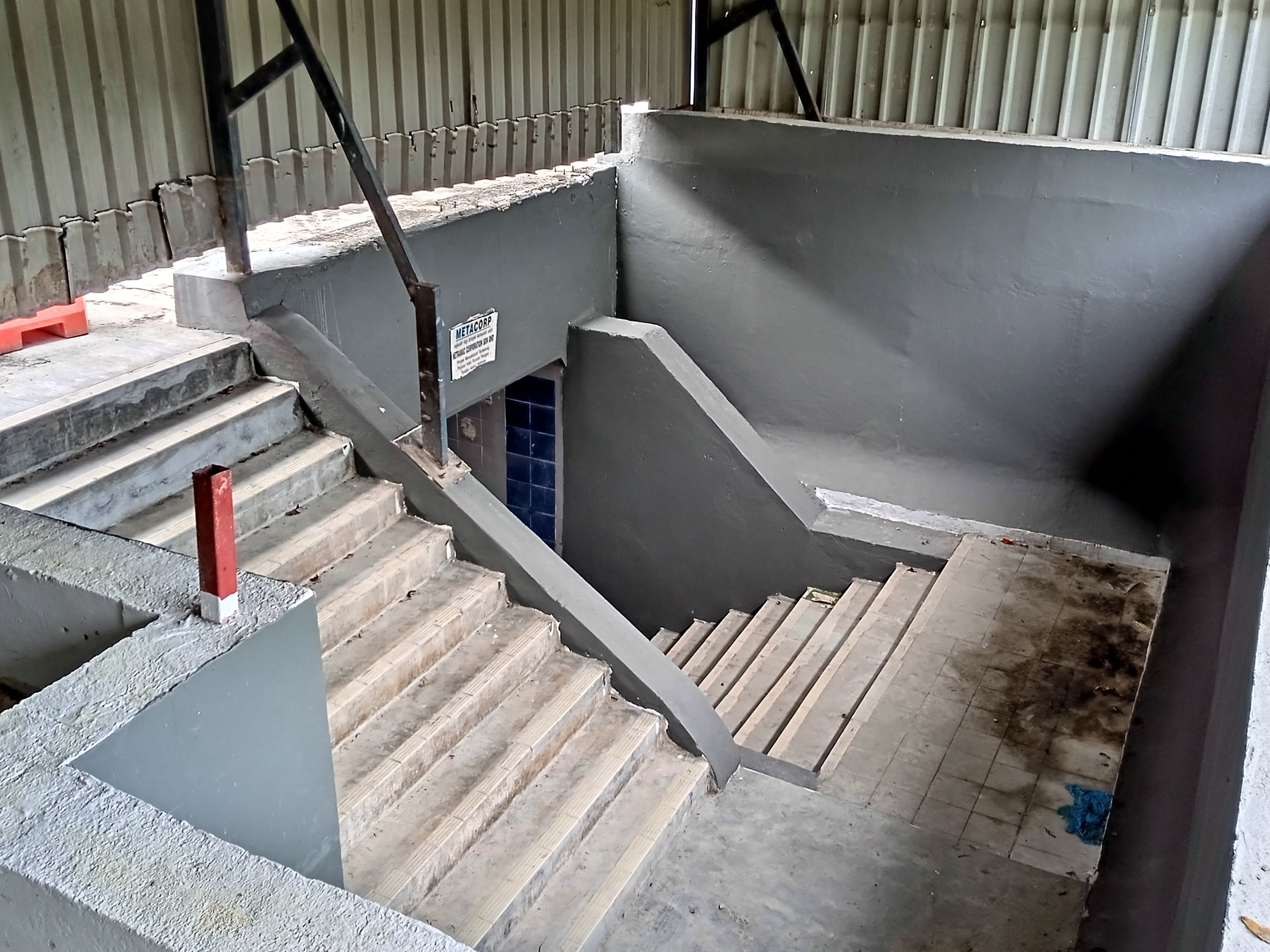
Closed underground tunnel to Pekeliling Flats

The Pekeliling Flats were built between 1964 and 1967 to accommodate the lower income group and squatter people in the city. They were seven blocks of the flats (Block A, Block B (both demolished in 2006), Block C, Block D, Block E, Block F, Block G) and four-storey shop houses located on Jalan Pekeliling (now Jalan Tun Razak) and Jalan Pahang, built at cost of RM20.5 million which was launched by the Kuala Lumpur Federal Capital Commissions (Suruhanjaya Ibu Kota).

== Current state ==
Blocks A and B were the first to be demolished in mid-2006 to make way for a proposed luxury apartment development project. However almost a decade had passed and the apartment was never built; the plot of land where Block A & B once stood remained empty and has turned into a 'mini jungle'.

The remaining blocks (Blocks C - G) on the other side of the road was earmarked to be demolished later. The last family was evacuated to Setapak in 2008. However, for some time after that the blocks continues to stand, appearing as a sore thumb in the Kuala Lumpur skyline.

== Demolition ==
After standing empty for almost six years, demolition work finally began in January 2014 and completed over a span of almost two years, finishing by November 2015. The site became the Titiwangsa MRT station on the Putrajaya line.

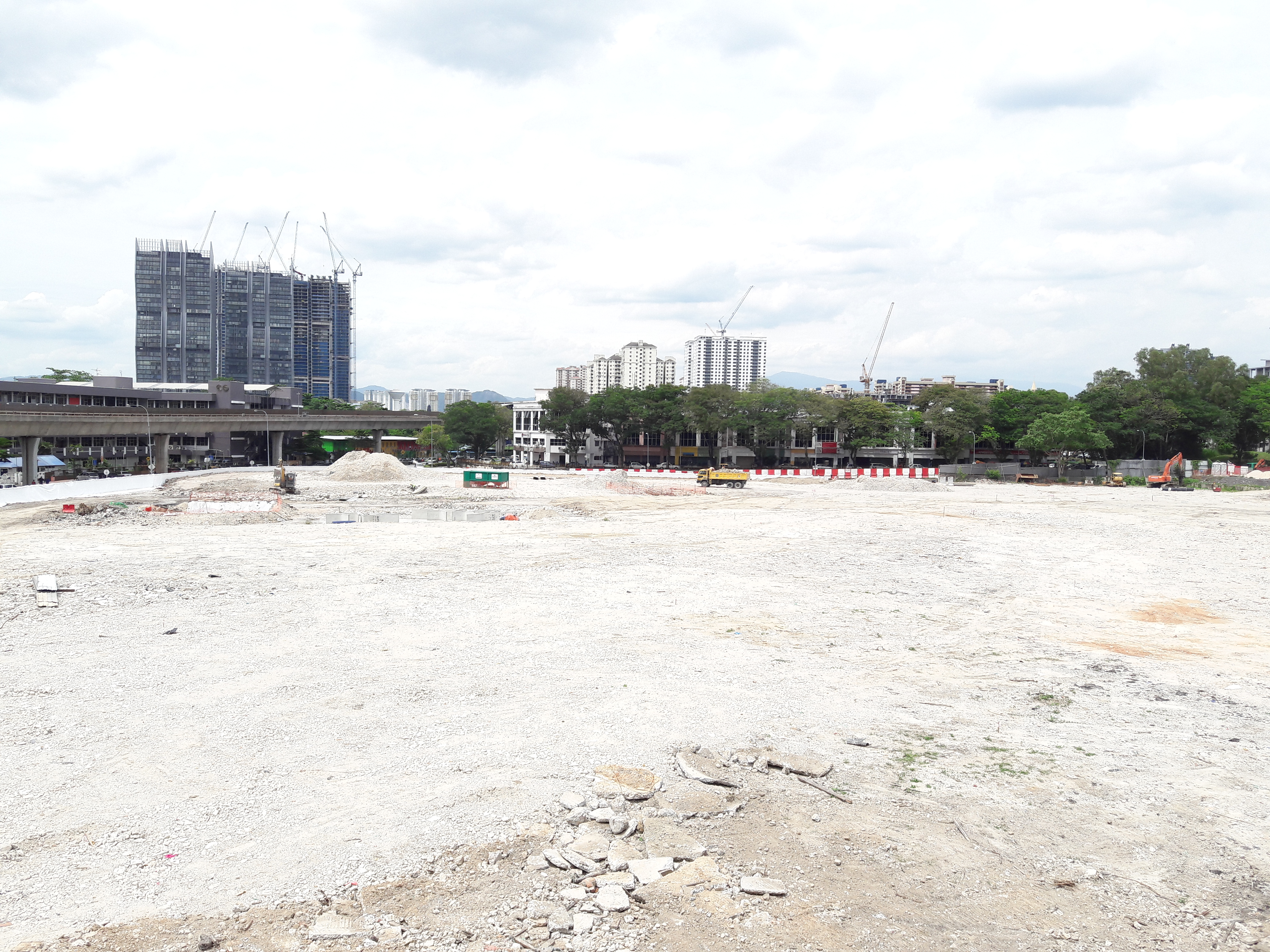
Site of the former Pekeliling Flats in October 2016, looking from the Titiwangsa Monorail station towards Sentul.
