= Taman Melati =

Township in Kuala Lumpur, Malaysia

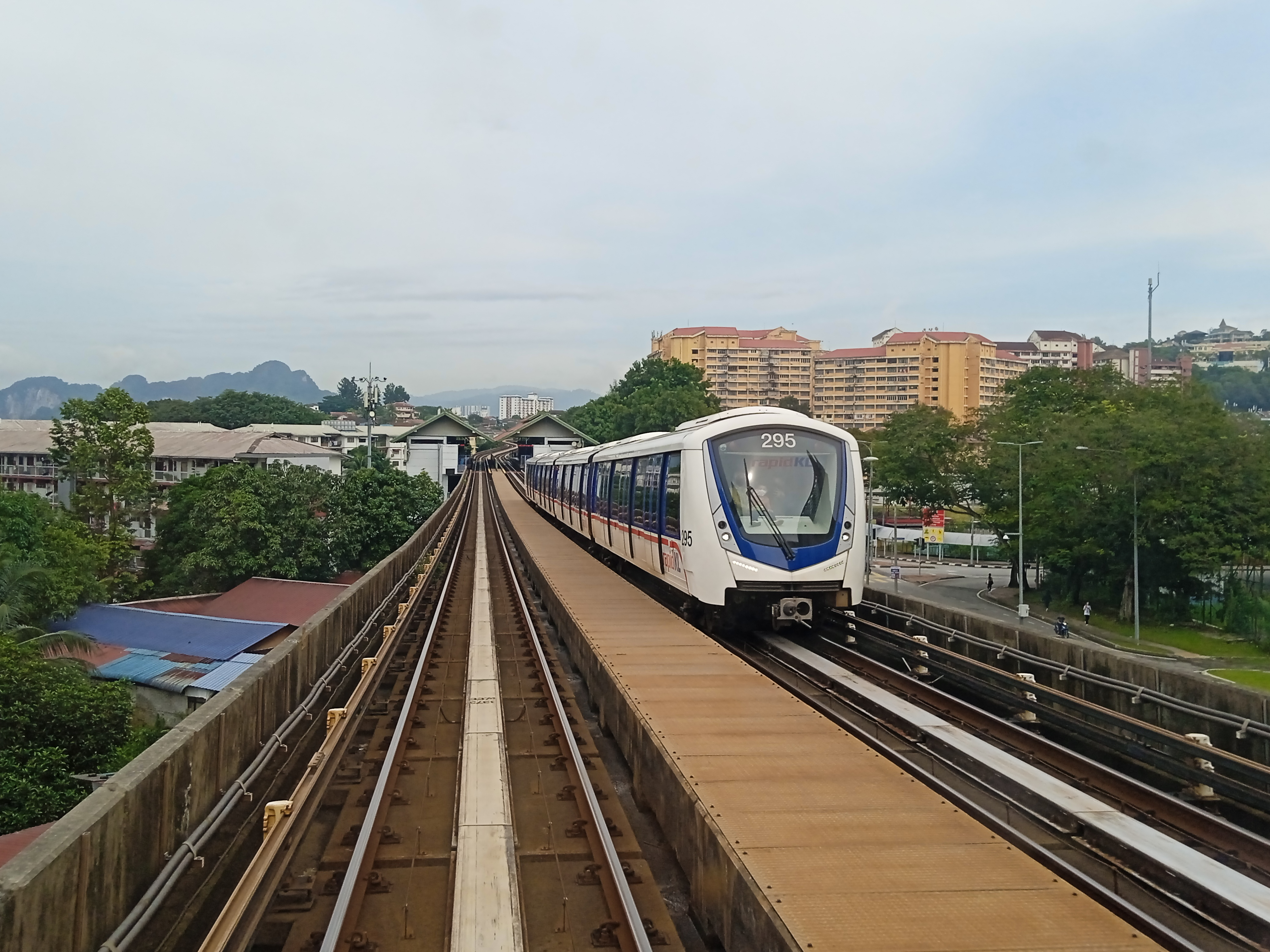
LRT Kelana Jaya Line train in Taman Melati

Taman Melati is a township in Wangsa Maju, Kuala Lumpur, Malaysia, located between Gombak, Klang Gates, Wangsa Maju city centre, and Taman Melawati. The Kelana Jaya Line's Taman Melati LRT station is situated in this area.

== Location ==
Taman Melati is located in the Wangsa Maju parliamentary constituency and the Wangsa Maju administrative division of Kuala Lumpur. As of October 2026, the representative for Wangsa Maju is Zahir Hassan, from PKR.

== Entertainment ==
The M3 Mall is located in Taman Melati, opposite Taman Melati flats, on Jalan Madrasah.

== Educational institutions ==
- SK Taman Melati
- Sekolah Rendah Agama al-Falahiah
- SMK Taman Melati
- Tunku Abdul Rahman University College (located near Taman Melati)
- International Islamic University Malaysia (located 5 km from Taman Melati)
- Sekolah Rendah Agama Salehuddin Al-Ayyubi

== Religious sites ==
- Masjid Salehuddin al-Ayyubi
- Surau Taman Melati
- Surau Al Fallah, Putra Villa
- Sri Ayyanareeswarar Temple
