= TAR EC College =

College in Kuala Lumpur, Malaysia

Coordinates: 3.214545°N 101.730890°E

- Kolej TAR EC (Malay) 拉曼学前教育学院 (Chinese)
- Former names: Institute CECE
- Motto: Always in the Service of Children
- Type: Private
- Established: 1993
- Chairman: N/A
- Location: Setapak, Kuala Lumpur, Malaysia
- Colours: Purple, red, orange, black and white
- Website: www.tarec.edu.my

Chinese name
- Simplified Chinese: 馬來西亞學前教育學院
- Traditional Chinese: 马来西亚学前教育学院
Transcriptions
Standard Mandarin
- Hanyu Pinyin: Mǎláixīyà Xuéqián Jiàoyù Xuéyuàn

TAR EC College, abbreviated as TAR EC, is a non-profit, private early childhood education college in Malaysia, registered with Ministry of Higher Education (MOHE). It is located in Setapak, Kuala Lumpur, adjacent to Tunku Abdul Rahman University College Kuala Lumpur Main Campus.

The institute was established in 1993 and was the only private and non-profit institution of higher learning, concentrating solely on pre-school teachers’ training in Malaysia.

Over the past 19 years, more than 2,500 pre-school teachers have graduated from the institute. On 1 November 2015, TAR EC College signs a Memorandum of Understanding (MOU) with National Pingtung University (NPTU), Taiwan to allow graduates from early childhood education further studies in this university.

The institute also have partnership with professional bodies such as Early Childhood Care and Education Council and Association of Professional Early Childhood Educators Malaysia.

== Mission & Aim ==
=== Mission ===
TAR EC College focuses on child advocacy in three dimensions:

- Enabling every child regardless of background, to have access to quality education - made possible when the teacher is trained and qualified;
- Quality early childhood education is on the right pedagogy; and
- Right pedagogy implies the right methodology.

=== Aim ===
TAR EC College aims to raise the professional standard of early childhood practitioners and to ensure that our educators are trained and qualified professionals with:

- Strong knowledge based on the child, including appropriate learning experiences, assessment and evaluation;
- Skills and competencies to relate to children; and
- Attitude and interest in the development of early childhood education

== Programmes ==
TAR EC College currently have following programmes:

- Diploma in Early Childhood Education
- Diploma in Early Childhood Special Education
- Basic Child Care Course or Kursus Asuhan dan Didikan Kanak-Kanak PERMATA (KAP) - Accredited by the Jabatan Kebajikan Masyarakat Malaysia (JKMM) from the Ministry of Women, Family and Community Development to conduct this course in accordance with the Childcare Centers Act 1984, Regulations 41 & Regulations (Institutional) 1985

== Partner Institution ==
- Malaysia
  - Universiti Tunku Abdul Rahman
  - Quest International University Perak
- Taiwan
  - National Pingtung University
- United Kingdom
  - University College Birmingham
  - University of Gloucestershire
