= Roger Tan =

Malaysian lawyer (born 1961)

Yang Berbahagia Datuk Roger Tan Kor Mee 郑光明
- Roger Tan, an op-ed columnist.

Personal details
- Born: 1 October 1961 (age 64) Yong Peng, Johor, Malaysia.
- Parent: Tan Sue Yong & Swee Mei
- Education: SMI Yong Peng; Tunku Abdul Rahman University College; Queen Mary College, University of London; Gray's Inn, London; National University of Singapore
- Occupation: Lawyer
- Website: www.rogertan.com

Datuk Roger Tan Kor Mee (simplified Chinese: 郑光明; traditional Chinese: 鄭光明; pinyin: Zhèng Guāngmíng; Pe̍h-ōe-jī: Tēⁿ Kong-mê; born 1 October 1961) is a Malaysian lawyer.

== Early life ==
Tan is the sixth child and youngest son of Tan Sue Yong and Swee Mei. He was born and raised in Yong Peng new village.

== Education ==
Tan received his early education at Sekolah Menengah Inggeris (Secondary English School) in his hometown, and at the Tunku Abdul Rahman College in Kuala Lumpur.

He later taught for a short period at the Chung Hwa High School, Rengit, Johor before he left to read law at Queen Mary College, University of London. In July 1988, he was admitted as a barrister of the Honourable Society of Gray's Inn, London. In 1989, he was admitted as an advocate and solicitor in Singapore. He is also a member of Singapore Academy of Law, and associate member of the Law Society of Singapore. He also holds a Master of Laws degree from the National University of Singapore.

== Career ==
=== Professional ===
As a lawyer, he has acted for various corporations in Malaysia, Singapore and Hong Kong, and as a legal consultant to various statutory bodies and government authorities in Malaysia.

He sat in the legislative drafting committees of Johor State Government and the Federal Ministry of Housing and Local Government with regard to Water Supply Enactment 1993 of Johor, Water Supply (Successor Company) Enactment 1993 of Johor, Housing Developers (Control and Licensing) (Amendment) Act 2002 and its regulations, Housing Development (Control And Licensing) (Amendment) Act 2007 and its regulations, and the Solid Waste And Public Cleansing Management Act 2007.

The Johor Muslim orphans are indebted to him when Tan acted pro bono (free of charge) for Al-Yatama Bhd, which runs nine Muslim orphanages in Johor, and successfully recovered and repossessed 2,700 acres (11 km^{2}) of its land in Kota Tinggi, Johor in addition to obtaining a judgment sum of RM64 million for Al-Yatama Bhd in 2004.

=== Social ===
In 1988, he was one of the young lawyers selected to meet with Singapore Chief Justice, Wee Chong Jin to give their views on the establishment of Singapore Academy of Law. Tan was instrumental in founding the Waste Management Association of Malaysia in 2005, having drafted its constitution and assumed office as its first Honorary Secretary. In 2008, the International Bar Association appointed him as part of an international team to evaluate the state of judiciary and the rule of law in Fiji.

=== Public Service ===
- Trustee, TARC Education Fund
- Commissioner, Malaysian Aviation Commission
- President, Strata Management Tribunal (2015–2022)
- Appointed on 10 July 2019 as a member of the Government's Special Task Force to investigate the alleged enforced disappearances of Pastor Raymond Koh and activist Amri Che Mat.
- Board Member, Advocates & Solicitors Disciplinary Board (2013–2015) & (2017–2019)
- Head, Malaysian Bar's Evaluation Team set up by the Legal Profession Qualifying Board to assess the law degree programmes offered by universities.
- Commissioner, National Water Services Commission (SPAN). (2009–2017)
- Board Member, Solid Waste Management and Public Cleansing Corporation. (2009–2015)

=== Award ===
Panglima Jasa Negara, by the Yang di-Pertuan Agong (King) XIV of Malaysia in conjunction with His Majesty's Official Birthday on 6 June 2015. The award carries the title "Datuk".

=== Personal ===
In his early years of practice, he also taught Business Law part-time at his alma mater, TAR College. He is a very active member of the legal fraternity, having served in various positions at the Malaysian Bar. He has been acknowledged to have transformed the public image of the Malaysian Bar when he singlehandedly designed and managed the website of the Malaysian Bar for 4 years.

He writes regularly and has contributed many articles in local and foreign legal periodicals and news media.
