= Taman Melati LRT station =

Metro station in Kuala Lumpur, Malaysia

KJ2 Taman Melati
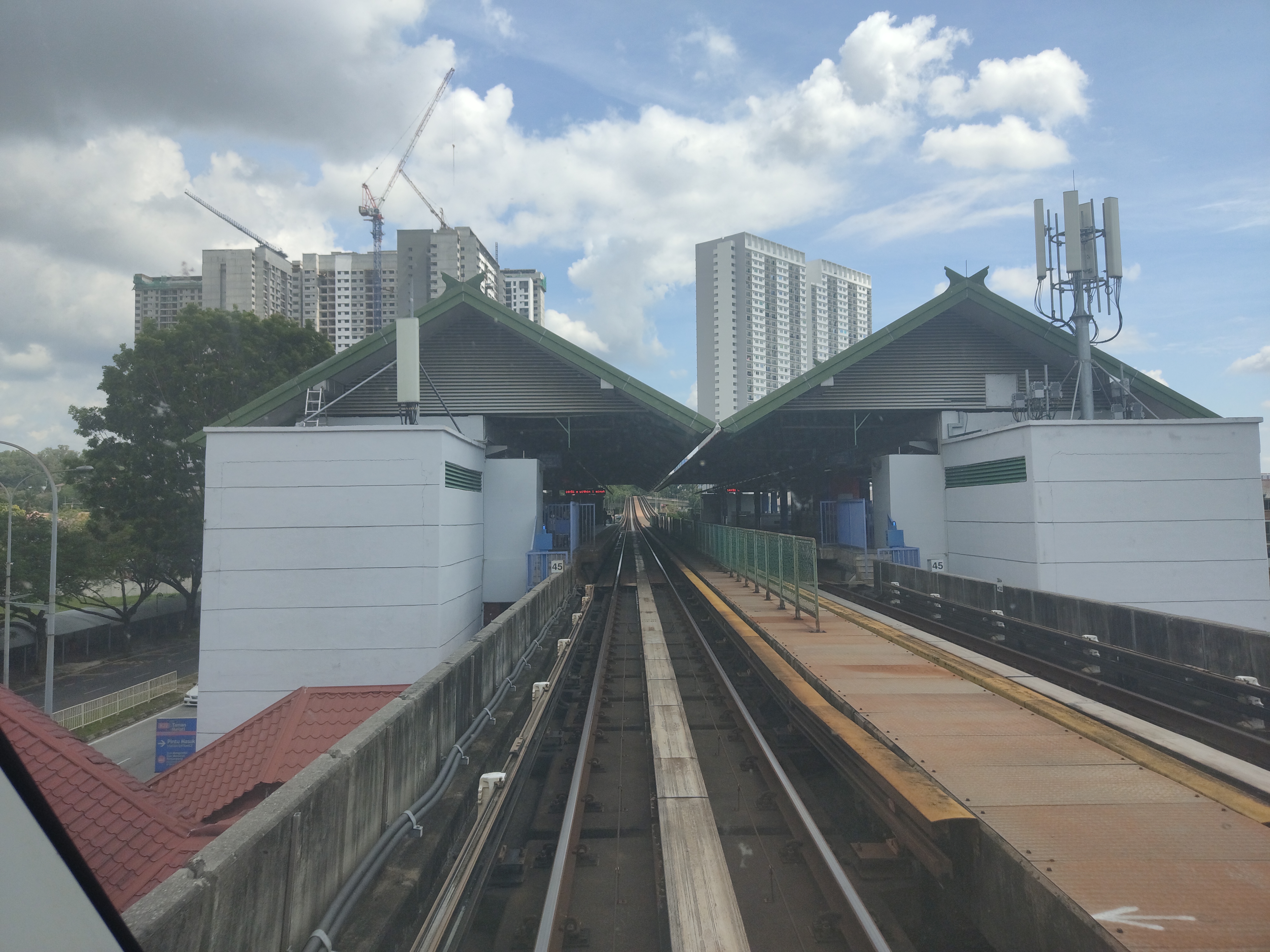

General information
- Other names: Malay: تامن ملاتي (Jawi); Chinese: 美拉蒂花园; Tamil: தாமான் மெலாத்தி
- Location: Persiaran Pertahanan, Taman Melati; 53100 Kuala Lumpur; Malaysia
- Coordinates: 3°13′10″N 101°43′18″E
- System: Rapid KL
- Owner: Prasarana Malaysia
- Operator: Rapid Rail
- Line: 5 Kelana Jaya Line
- Platforms: 2 side platforms
- Tracks: 2

Construction
- Structure type: Elevated
- Parking: Available with payment, under DBKL (6 parking bays)
- Accessible: Yes

Other information
- Station code: KJ2

History
- Opened: 1 June 1999; 27 years ago

Services
Preceding station		Following station
Gombak Terminus	Kelana Jaya Line	Wangsa Maju towards Putra Heights
Location

Taman Melati LRT station is an elevated light rapid transit (LRT) station in northern Kuala Lumpur, Malaysia, part of the LRT Kelana Jaya Line. The station was opened on 1 June 1999, as part of the line's second segment encompassing 12 stations between Masjid Jamek and Terminal PUTRA (not including Sri Rampai) and an underground line.

== Location ==
Taman Melati station is on the northern edge of Kuala Lumpur's city limits, 400 metres from the nearest Kuala Lumpur-Selangor border, and was built along Persiaran Pertahanan. In addition to serving its namesake location, Taman Melati, to the east, the station is also accessible from other surrounding housing estates, including Gombak Setia to the west (in east Gombak), Taman Setapak Jaya to the south (north of Setapak), and, to an extent, Taman Cemerlang to the north.

Taman Melati station is the last station northwards to Gombak (formerly known as Terminal PUTRA station), and is one of two Kelana Jaya Line stations serving the Taman Melati and Taman Cemerlang areas, the other being Gombak itself.

== Design ==
As an elevated station, Taman Melati station contains three levels: The access points at street level, and the ticket area and adjoining platforms on the two elevated levels. All levels are linked via stairways, escalators and elevators designated for physically challenged passengers. The station uses a single island platform for trains travelling in both directions of the line, and is entirely sheltered by a gabled roof supported by latticed frames.

== Connections ==
Route No.	Via	Connecting to	Reachable	Notes
T202	Persiaran Pertahanan; Jalan Madrasah; Jalan Dewan; Jalan Gombak; Jalan Batu Caves; Jalan Taman Gombak; Jalan Mamar	172	M3 Shopping Mall; SMK Seri Gombak; SK Gombak Setia; Nurul Mustaqim Mosque (Gombak Setia); Bilal ibn Rabah Mosque; Batu 6 Mosque	
T203	Persiaran Pertahanan; Jalan Madrasah; Jalan Dewan; Jalan Gombak; Jalan Balau; Jalan Kempas; Jalan Jerejak; Jalan Cengal; Jalan Langkawi; Jalan Danau Saujana; Jalan Genting Klang; Jalan Taman Ibu Kota; Jalan Ibukota Kanan; Jalan Meranti	222; 250; T250	M3 Shopping Mall; Plaza Idaman; Medan Idaman Business Centre; AEON BiG Danau Kota; PV 12; Bazaria Wangsa maju Taman Setapak Commercial Centre; Gombak Police Station; Gombak Post Office; SK Gombak Setia; SK (1) Gombak; SJK (C) Lee Rubber; SMK Gombak Setia; SRA Salahuddin AL Ayyubi; SRA Al Nawawi; SRA At-Taqwa; SRA Zaid Bin Harithah; Al-Syakirin Mosque (Gombak); Nurul Mustaqim Mosque (Gombak Setia); Medan Idaman Mosque; Salahuddin Al-Ayubbi Mosque (Taman Melati); Madrasah Iktisamiah Taman Melati	Full DRT route from 22 June 2024 booking through Trek Rides required
