= VTAR Institute =

Coordinates: 3.215038°N 101.731799°E

- Institut VTAR (Malay) 拉曼技职学院 (Chinese)
- Motto: Quality and Affordable Education
- Type: Private
- Established: 1990
- Chairman: YB Senator Datuk Yoo Wei How
- Principal: Tan Cheng Liang
- Location: Kuala Lumpur, Malaysia
- Campus: Kuala Lumpur
- Website: www.vtar.edu.my

Chinese name
- Simplified Chinese: 拉曼技职学院
- Traditional Chinese: 拉曼技職學院
Transcriptions
Standard Mandarin
- Hanyu Pinyin: Lāmàn Jìzhí Xuéyuàn

VTAR Institute, abbreviated as VTAR, is a private vocational college located at Kuala Lumpur, Malaysia.

VTAR Institute was formerly known as Institute Jayadiri which was founded in 1992 as a community project of Koperasi Jayadiri Malaysia Berhad and conducts its classes in some shoplots in Old Klang Road. Then in 2000 Institute Jayadiri was relocated to Wisma MCA and renamed Kojadi Institute. In 2014, the president of MCA approved the relocation of Kojadi Institute to Tunku Abdul Rahman University College in Setapak, Kuala Lumpur in the hope that this new premise will have a more conducive environment for the students.

VTAR is the first private institute in Malaysia received the approval from Energy Commission (ST) to offer Wireman Course (PW2). In 2011, VTAR was rated 4 star rating from Jabatan Pembangunan Kemahiran (JPK).

On 17 March 2015, VTAR signs a memorandum of understanding (MOU) with TransWorld University (TWU), Taiwan to allow graduates from Beauty Therapy or Hairdressing further studies in this university.

On 27 September 2019, VTAR is an approved UK's Highfield Qualifications training centre.

== History ==
VTAR was formed in 1990. Initially, it conducted academic programmes from certificate level until diploma level and vocational programmes up until certificate level. It also collaborate with Universiti Tunku Abdul Rahman to offer Foundation In Arts that can further study into UTAR degree programmes. Academic programmes were accredited by the Malaysian Qualifications Agency (MQA) whilst the vocational programmes were accredited by Jabatan Pembangunan Kemahiran (JPK), Kementerian Sumber Manusia.

In mid-2011, VTAR phased out the academic programmes to concentrate fully on vocational programmes. This change of focus is in line with the government's call to produce more skilled workers. Students who pass the vocational courses will be awarded the Sijil Kemahiran Malaysia (SKM) which accredited by JPK.

== Departments ==
There are two departments under VTAR Institute:

=== Department SKM – Engineering ===
- Sijil Kemahiran Malaysia (SKM) Electronic Equipment Level 2 & 3
- Sijil Kemahiran Malaysia (SKM) Electrical Installation and Maintenance Level 2 & 3

=== Department SKM – Beauty Therapy ===
- Sijil Kemahiran Malaysia (SKM) Beauty Therapy Level 1 & 2
- Diploma in Hairdressing

=== Department SKM – Automotive ===
- Diploma Kemahiran Malaysia (DKM) Automotive Technology Level 4 - In collaboration with Tekat Academy

=== Department SKM – Furniture Technology ===
- Sijil Kemahiran Malaysia (SKM) Furniture Production Operation Level 2 & 3 - In collaboration with Malaysian Furniture Council (MFC)

== Partner Institution ==
- Malaysia
  - Universiti Tunku Abdul Rahman
- Taiwan
  - TransWorld University
