= Wangsa Maju LRT station =

Railway station in Kuala Lumpur, Malaysia

KJ3 Wangsa Maju
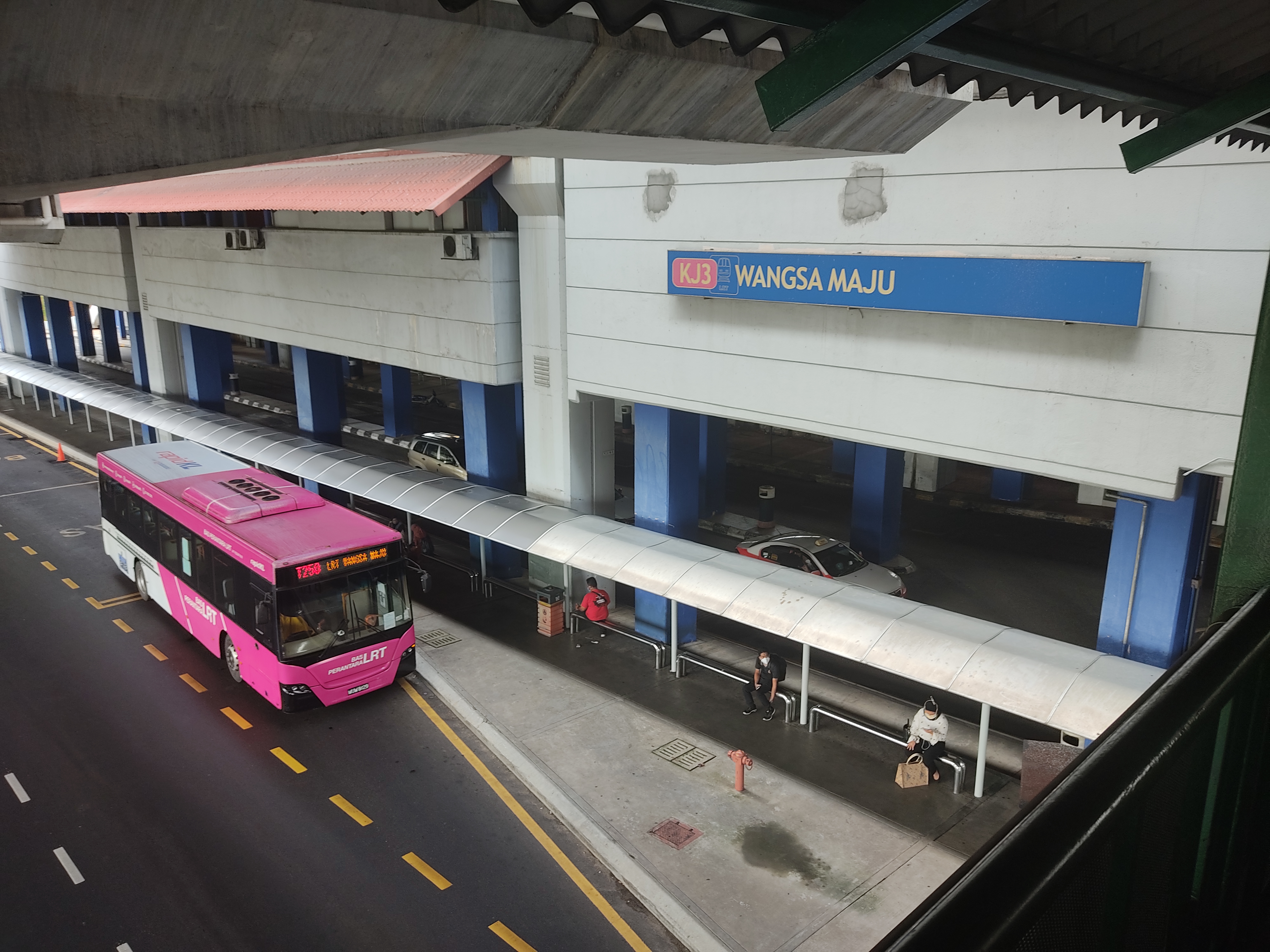
- Wangsa Maju LRT station from pedestrian walkway with pink colour Feeder Bus stop at the station

General information
- Other names: Malay: وڠسا ماجو (Jawi); Chinese: 旺沙玛珠; Tamil: வங்சா மாஜு
- Location: Jalan 1/27A and Jalan 16/27B; Section 2, Wangsa Maju; 53300 Kuala Lumpur; Malaysia
- Coordinates: 3°12′20″N 101°43′53″E
- System: Rapid KL
- Owner: Prasarana Malaysia
- Operator: Rapid Rail
- Line: 5 Kelana Jaya Line
- Platforms: 1 island platform
- Tracks: 2

Construction
- Structure type: Elevated
- Parking: Available with payment, under DBKL (259 parking bays, 100 motorcycle bays).
- Accessible: Available

Other information
- Station code: KJ3

History
- Opened: 1 June 1999; 27 years ago

Services
Preceding station		Following station
Taman Melati towards Gombak	Kelana Jaya Line	Sri Rampai towards Putra Heights
Location

Wangsa Maju LRT station is an elevated light rapid transit (LRT) station in Wangsa Maju, Kuala Lumpur, Malaysia, forming part of the LRT Kelana Jaya Line. The station opened on 1 June 1999, as part of the line's second segment encompassing 12 stations between Pasar Seni and Terminal PUTRA (has since been renamed to Gombak) and an underground line.

== Location ==
Wangsa Maju station is the third last station northwards to Gombak.

The station is situated directly within the northern Kuala Lumpur suburb of Wangsa Maju. The station, located along the main thoroughfare of Jalan 1/27A running from the northwest to the southeast, is wedged between two residential estates: Section 1 of Wangsa Maju to the southwest and Desa Setapak to the northwest, with Section 2 of Wangsa Maju located further northwest. In addition to accessibility from Jalan 1/27A, the station is also connected via Jalan 16/27B, Desa Setapak's residential road.

Due to its proximity to various shopping centres, Alpha Angle and AEON Big, and two higher education institutions - which are Tunku Abdul Rahman University of Management and Technology (TAR UMT) and the University of Tunku Abdul Rahman (UTAR) - the station is usually busy during the weekdays.

== Connections ==
The Kumpool vanpool ride-sharing service to Wangsa Maju LRT station also available here.

=== Buses ===
Route No.	Via	Connecting to	Reachable
T250	Jalan Malinja; Jalan Genting Klang; Jalan Taman Ibu Kota; Jalan Langkawi; Jalan Danau Saujana	222; 250; T203	Setapak Central; AEON Wangsa Maju Alpha Angle; Bazaria Wangsa Maju; PV12; PV128; AEON Big Danau Kota; Genting Klang Entrepreneur Plaza; Wangsa Maju Section 2 Wet market and Hawker Center; Columbia Asia Hospital Taman Danau Kota; Tuanku Mizan Military Hospital; Danau Kota Lake Park; Tunku Abdul Rahman University of Management & Technology (TAR UMT); SK Danau Kota; Taman Bunga Raya Mosque; Al-Amin Mosque (Taman Setapak Indah); Al-Falah Mosque (Danau Kota); Usamah Bin Zaid Mosque
222	Jalan Taman Melawati; FT 28 Kuala Lumpur Middle Ring Road 2 (MRR2); Jalan 1/27A; KJ3 Wangsa Maju; Jalan Malinja; Jalan Genting Klang; Jalan Pahang; Jalan Ipoh	201; 251; 254; 302; 402; 852; GOKL (Red Line); GOKL (Blue Line)	AEON Wangsa Maju Alpha Angle; Melawati Mall; Taman Melawati Commercial Area; Dataran Wangsa Maju; Usamah Bin Zaid Mosque; Sekolah Kebangsaan Taman Melawati 2 SMK Taman Melawati; SJK(T) Taman Melawati; SA Rakyat Taman Melawati; International School of Kuala Lumpur (Melawati Campus)
250	Jalan 1/27A; KJ3 Wangsa Maju; Jalan Malinja; Jalan Genting Klang; Jalan Pahang; Jalan Tuanku Abdul Rahman; Jalan Raja; Lebuh Pasar Besar; Jalan Tun Tan Siew Sin	100; 103; 104; 107; 120; 121; 122; 150; 151; 152; 170; 171; 172; 173; 180; 190; 191; 200; 202; 220; 252; 300; 303	Setapak Central; AEON Wangsa Maju Alpha Angle; Wangsa Maju Section 2 Wet market and Hawker Center; PV128; Star Parc Point Commercial Centre; Genting Klang Commercial Area; Giant Hypermarket Setapak; COURTS Setapak; JPJ Kuala Lumpur (Wangsa Maju branch); Columbia Asia Hospital Taman Danau Kota; Tuanku Mizan Military Hospital; Tunku Abdul Rahman University of Management & Technology; Vocational College Kuala Lumpur; SJK(C) Wangsa Maju; Usamah Bin Zaid Mosque; Taman Bunga Raya Mosque; Christ Lutheran Church (LCM); Seven Fairies Temple Setapak
253	Jalan 1/27A; FT 28 Kuala Lumpur Middle Ring Road 2 (MRR2); Jalan AU3/1; Jalan 3/56; Jalan 1/56; Jalan 10/56; Jalan AU3/1; Jalan Mamanda 9 Jalan Ampang	221; 300; 303; T300; T301; T302	Melawati Mall; AEON Wangsa Maju Alpha Angle; Dataran Wangsa Maju National Zoo of Malaysia; Tunku Abdul Rahman University of Management & Technology; Saudi Schools In Kuala Lumpur; SK Wangsa Jaya

== Incident ==
=== Robbery ===
On 3 June 2007, two men wearing full face motorcycle helmets and wielding parangs robbed the Wangsa Maju station at 10:10 pm (MST) and relieved RM7,000 from its ticket counter. No injuries were reported. The robbery, having taken place at a mass transit station, is the first of its kind in the country.

== See also ==
- List of rail transit stations in Klang Valley
