= Taman Ibukota =

Township in Setapak, Kuala Lumpur, Malaysia

Taman Ibukota is a Malay majority township in Setapak, Kuala Lumpur, Malaysia. It is a large and rather old neighborhood dating back to the 1970s when Kuala Lumpur City Hall (DBKL) workers were given discounted rates to purchase the houses there.

== Location ==
Taman Ibu Kota is located in Setapak, where it falls under the Wangsa Maju parliamentary constituency. It is also located in the Wangsa Maju Administrative Division in the Federal Territory of Kuala Lumpur. It is administered by Dewan Bandaraya Kuala Lumpur.

== Education ==
Sekolah Rendah Agama Taman Ibu Kota

SJK (C) Lee Rubber

== See also ==
- Kampung Padang Balang
