= Columbia Asia =

Hospital chain located in Asia

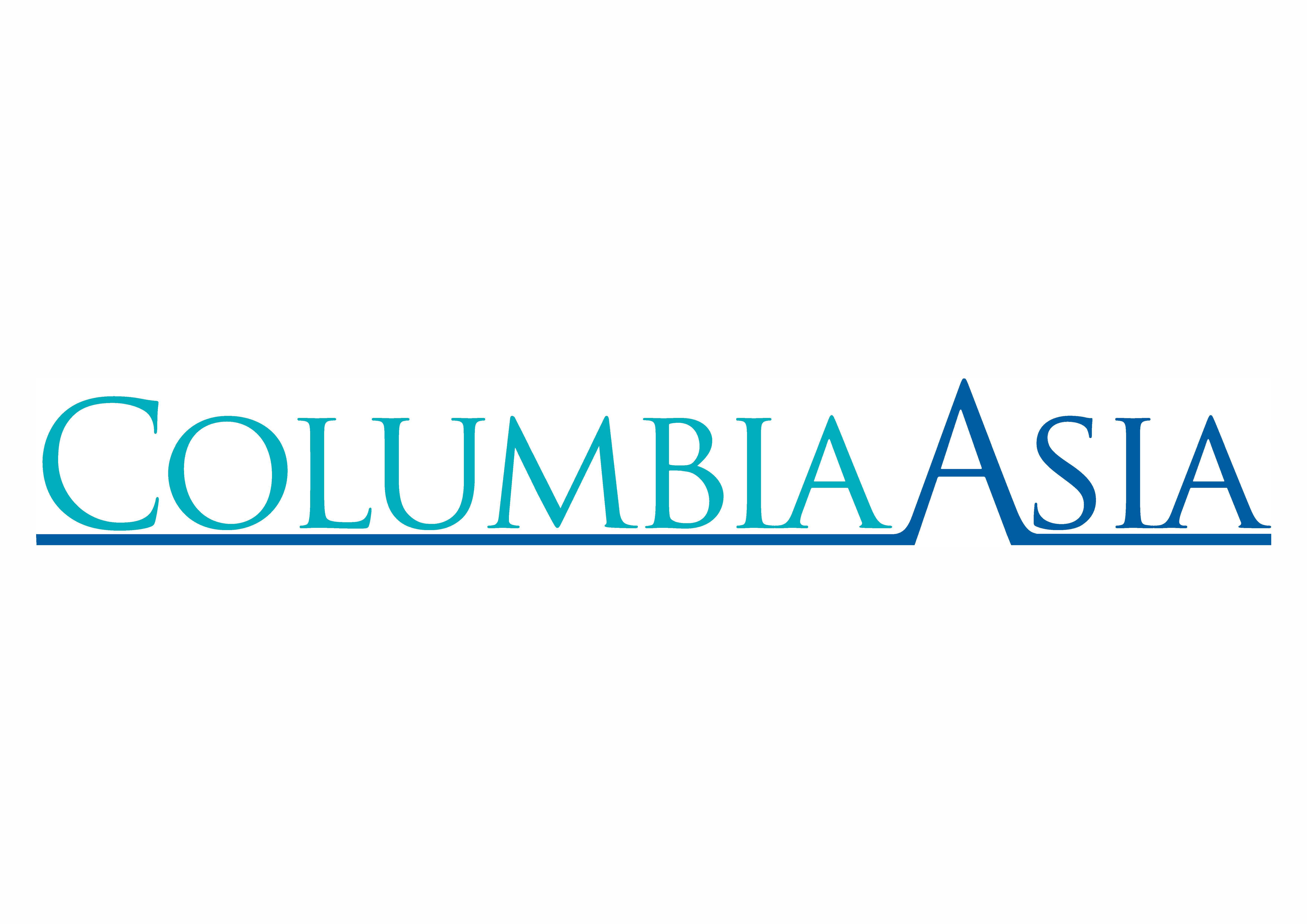
- Company type: Private
- Industry: Healthcare
- Founded: 1996
- Headquarters: Kuala Lumpur, Malaysia
- Key people: Managing Director & Group CEO; Dr. Chan Boon Kheng,
- Number of employees: 5,820
- Website: https://www.columbiaasia.com/

Columbia Asia is a multinational chain of hospitals and one of the largest and fastest-growing healthcare companies in Southeast Asia. Columbia Asia started its operations in 1996, with the first hospital acquired a year later in Sarawak, East Malaysia. Currently, it has 19 medical facilities across Southeast Asia: 13 in Malaysia, 1 in Vietnam, and 5 in Indonesia.

In September 2019, a joint-venture partnership between Malaysian-based conglomerate, Hong Leong Group, and alternative asset firm, TPG had acquired most of Columbia Asia assets in Southeast Asia which include Malaysia, Vietnam, and Indonesia with a total of 19 medical facilities.

Targeting the fast-growing middle-income group, Columbia Asia offers medical services by setting up mid-sized hospitals in residential areas.

== Current facilities ==
=== Malaysia ===
- Columbia Asia Hospital Batu Kawan
- Columbia Asia Hospital Bintulu Sarawak - Changed ownership
- Columbia Asia Hospital Bukit Jalil Kuala Lumpur
- Columbia Asia Hospital Bukit Rimau Selangor
- Columbia Asia Hospital Cheras Selangor
- Columbia Asia Hospital Iskandar Puteri Johore
- Columbia Asia Hospital Klang
- Columbia Asia Hospital Miri Sarawak - Changed ownership
- Columbia Asia Hospital Petaling Jaya Selangor
- Columbia Asia Hospital Puchong, opened in 2008.
- Columbia Asia Extended Care Hospital Shah Alam Selangor
- Columbia Asia Hospital Seremban Negeri Sembilan
- Columbia Asia Hospital Setapak Kuala Lumpur
- Columbia Asia Hospital Taiping Perak
- Columbia Asia Hospital Tebrau Johore

=== Vietnam ===
- Columbia Asia – Binh Duong International Hospital, Thuan An: The 100-bed facility was opened in 2012 and is the first 100% foreign-invested hospital in Binh Duong province.

=== Indonesia ===
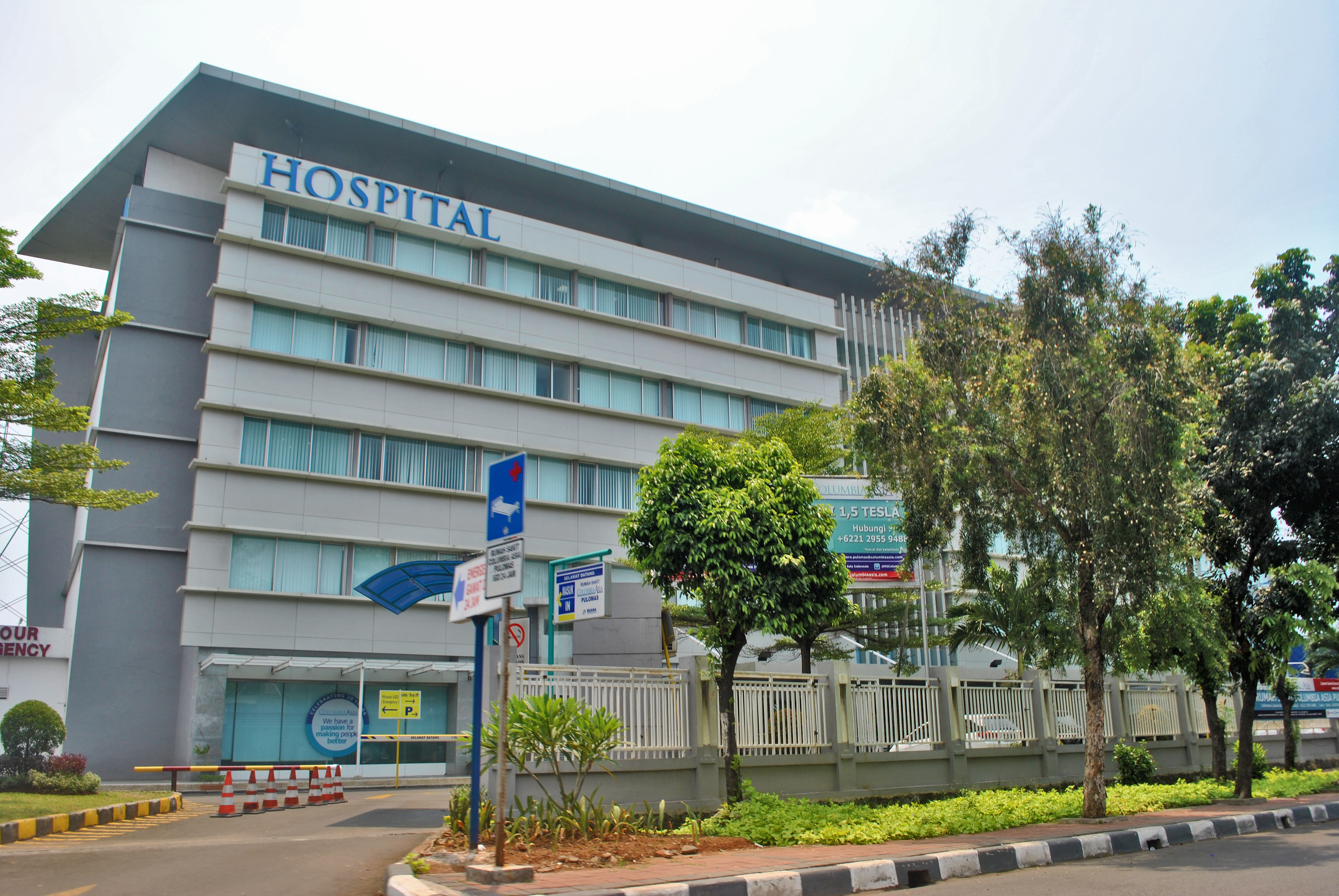
Columbia Asia Hospital in Pulomas

- Rumah Sakit Columbia Asia – Aksara Medan
- Rumah Sakit Columbia Asia – BSD Tangerang
- Rumah Sakit Columbia Asia – Pulomas, East Jakarta
- Rumah Sakit Columbia Asia – Semarang Central Java
- Rumah Sakit Columbia Asia – Medan North Sumatra

== Planned facilities ==
=== Malaysia ===
- Batu Kawan Penang - Coming soon
