= Taman P. Ramlee =

- Township
- Interactive map of Taman P. Ramlee
- Coordinates: 03°11′37″N 101°42′30″E
- Country: Malaysia
- State: Kuala Lumpur
- Time zone: UTC+8 (MST)

Taman P. Ramlee (formerly Taman Furlong) is a township located in the suburb of Setapak, Kuala Lumpur, Malaysia. The P. Ramlee Memorial is located here.
