= Puspakom =

Malaysian company

Pusat Pemeriksaan Kenderaan Berkomputer (Puspakom) Sdn Bhd
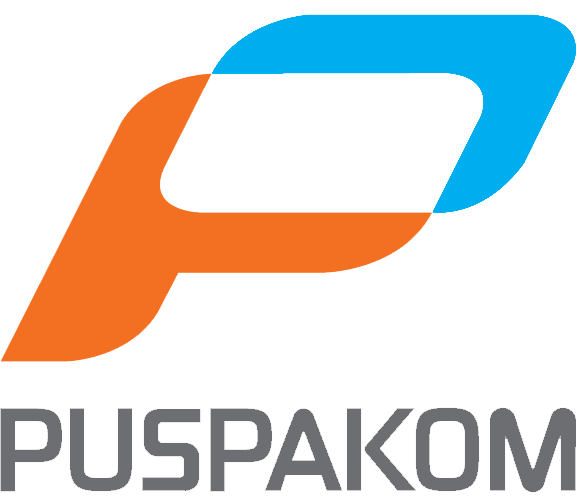
- Company type: Private
- Industry: vehicle inspection
- Founded: 1994
- Headquarters: Wisma DRB-Hicom, Shah Alam, Selangor
- Website: Puspakom Malaysia

Pusat Pemeriksaan Kenderaan Berkomputer or Puspakom is a Malaysian computerized vehicle inspection company owned by DRB-HICOM. It was established in 1994. Puspakom is the main inspection center for commercial vehicles throughout Malaysia. It has 50 permanent branches and 21 schedule branches. Puspakom occupies more than 17,000 vehicles per day including commercial vehicles, ownership transfer and volunteered inspection. Puspakom has more than 2000 Vehicle Examiners, accredited by the Road Transport Department who are capable of conducting inspections to ensure inspected vehicles safe.
