= Sri Rampai LRT station =

Railway station in Kuala Lumpur, Malaysia

KJ4 Sri Rampai

General information
- Other names: Malay: سري رمڤاي (Jawi); Chinese: 南北花园; Tamil: செரி ரம்பாய்
- Location: Jalan Wangsa Perdana 1 Taman Sri Rampai, Wangsa Maju; 53300 Kuala Lumpur; Malaysia
- Coordinates: 3°11′56″N 101°44′13″E
- System: Rapid KL
- Owner: Prasarana Malaysia
- Operator: Rapid Rail
- Line: 5 Kelana Jaya Line
- Platforms: 2 side platforms
- Tracks: 2

Construction
- Structure type: Half-sunken
- Parking: Not available

Other information
- Station code: KJ4

History
- Opened: 24 December 2010; 15 years ago

Services
Preceding station		Following station
Wangsa Maju towards Gombak	Kelana Jaya Line	Setiawangsa towards Putra Heights
Location

Sri Rampai LRT station is a light rapid transit (LRT) station in northern Kuala Lumpur, Malaysia, forming part of the LRT Kelana Jaya Line. The station, named after the nearby Taman Sri Rampai housing estate to the west, is located along the border between Taman Sri Rampai and Wangsa Maju to the east.

== History ==
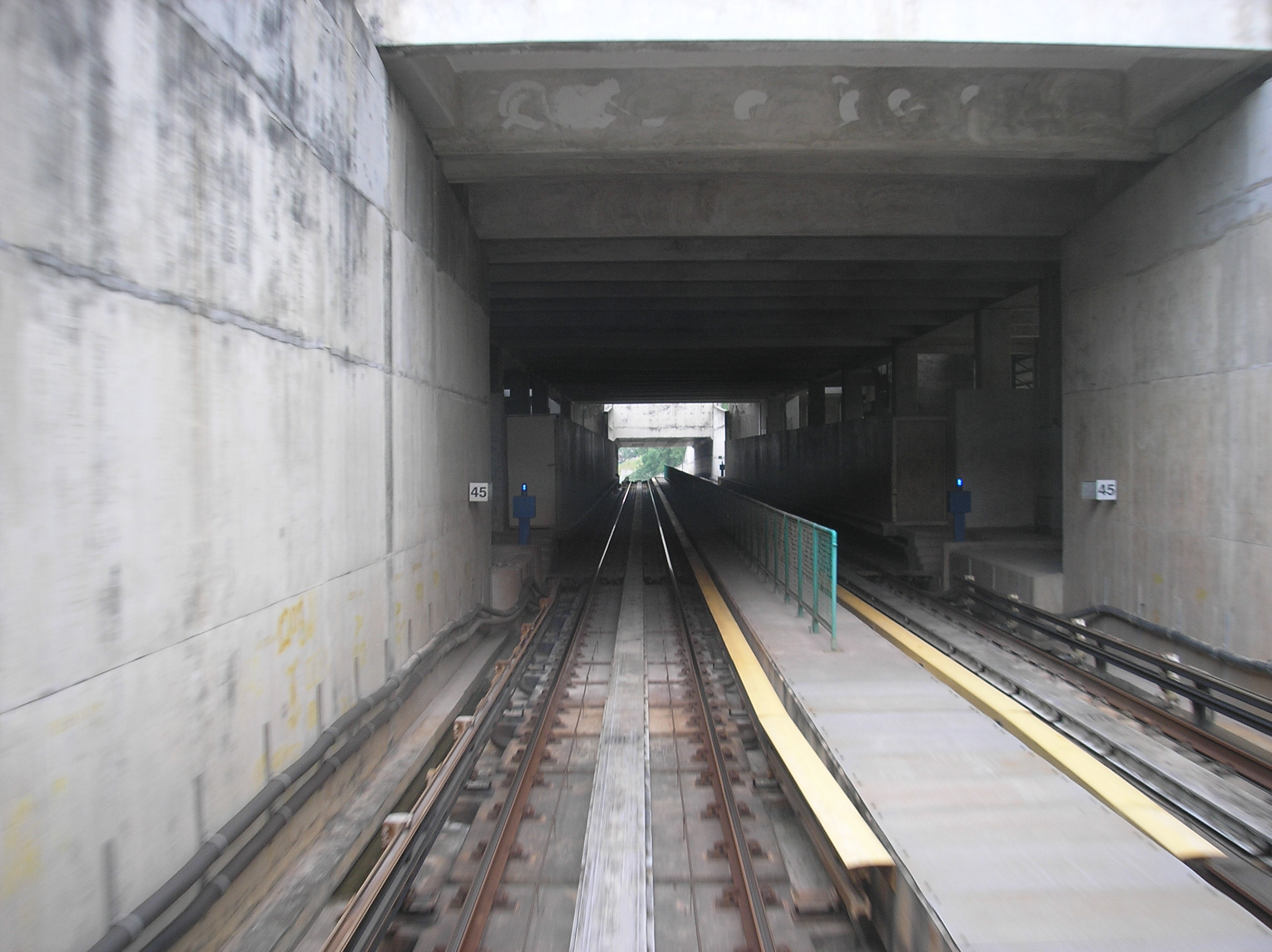
Sri Rampai station as viewed on a northbound train in March 2007, revealing the location in a mothballed state with boarded-up side platforms and an unfinished interior.

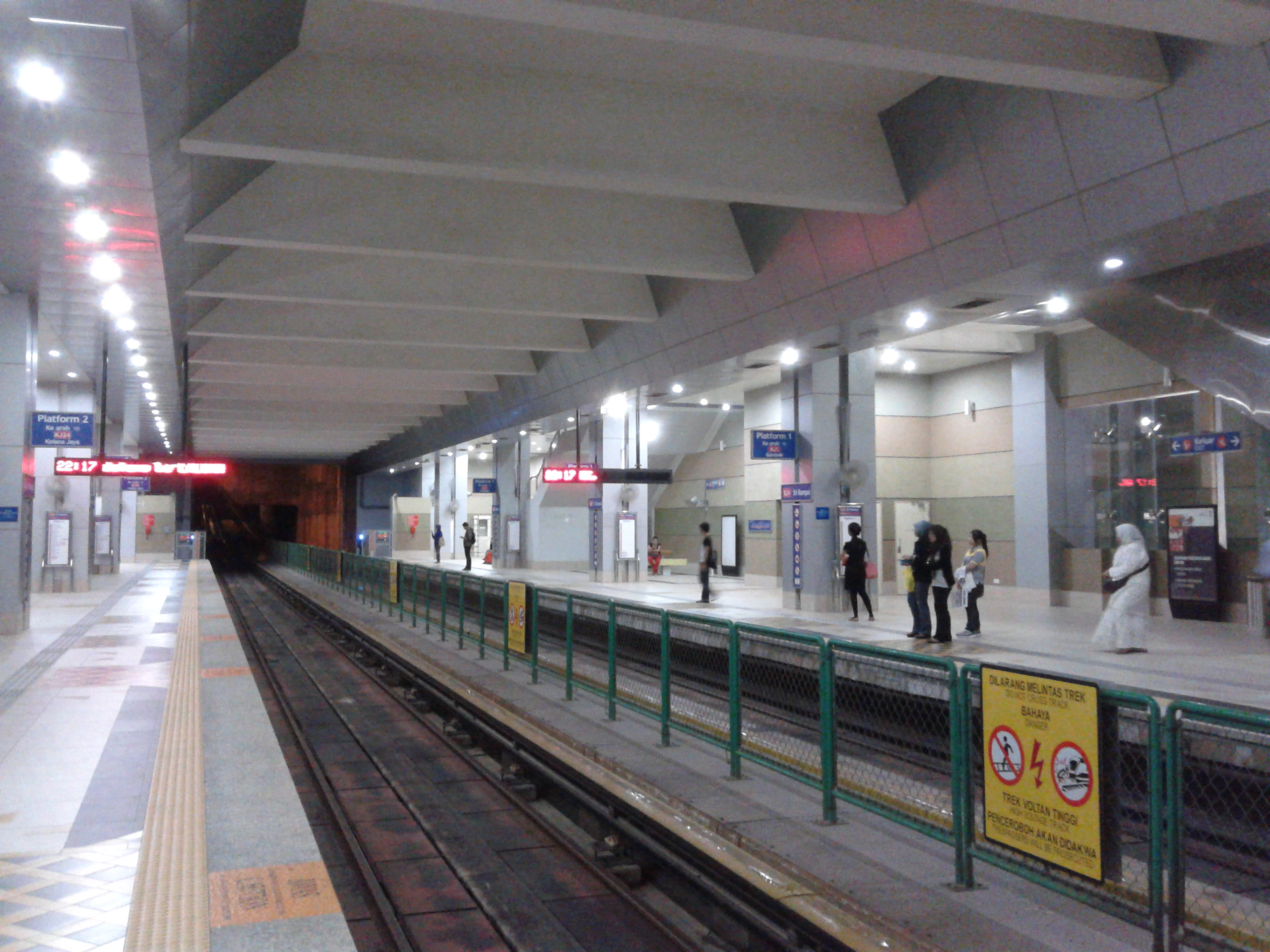
The current Sri Rampai LRT station at night heading south as of February 2013

While construction of the station started along with the rest of the line in 1996, it was halted in 1997 due to low population in the surrounding area and the cancellation of a housing project nearby. While the rest of the line opened in 1999 with Sri Rampai station listed on transit maps, it was effectively a ghost station with all trains programmed to simply pass through.

On the evening of 25 August 2006, the station's tracks were inundated by water from a flash flood, disrupting services along the entire Kelana Jaya Line for several hours and causing major passenger congestion between the KLCC and the KL Sentral stations. Services were gradually restored by 8:30 pm (MST).

Refurbishment of the station resumed in September 2008, likely in response to new property developments in the area, including Wangsa Walk Mall and a local AEON Big (formerly known as "Carrefour") supermarket. Works on the station were completed in early December 2010, and the station began revenue service on 24 December 2010.

== Design ==
The station is a two-level subsurface station, with the platform areas (containing two side platforms) constructed below the surface, while the rest of the structure is located above on the ground level. The station is the only one along the line to be at-grade, in comparison to other stations' elevated and underground designs. The station's layout is similar to that of Jalan Ipoh on the MRT Putrajaya Line and Hang Tuah on the LRT Ampang and Sri Petaling Lines.

== Places of interest ==
- Wangsa Walk Mall
- AEON Big Wangsa Maju

== Connections ==
=== Buses ===
Route No.	Via	Connecting to	Reachable	Notes
T221	Jalan Wangsa Delima; Jalan 34/26; Jalan 8/27a Jalan 6/27a Jalan Wangsa Melawati; Jalan AU5; Persiaran Permata; Jalan Taman Melawati; Jalam Kolam Air; Jalan Melawati 1 Jalan Melawati 2	220; 222; AJ01	Wangsa Walk Mall; D'wangsa; AEON BiG Wangsa Maju; Wangsa Delima Commercial Centre; Dataran Wangsa Maju; Melawati Mall; Taman Melawati Commercial Area; Giant Hypermarket Ulu Kelang; Wangsa Setia Commercial Area; SMK Seksyen 5 Wangsa Maju; SK Wangsa Jaya; As-Sobirin Mosque (Lembah Keramat); Al-Muttaqin Mosque	Full DRT route from 18 May 2024; Booking through Kumpool
T222	Jalan Wangsa Delima; Jalan 6/27A; Kuala Lumpur Middle Ring Road 2 (MRR2); Persiaran Permata; Jalan AU5; Jalan Ukay Perdana	AJ01	Wangsa Walk Mall; Dataran Wangsa Maju; Melawati Mall; Giant Hypermarket Ulu Kelang; AU5 MPAJ Food Court; Wangsa skatepark Taman Melawati Commercial Area; SK Wangsa Jaya; SMK Lembah Keramat; SMK Seri Keramat; Al-Muttaqin Mosque; Al-Ridhuan (Hulu Klang); Ukay Perdana Mosque	
T251	Jalan Wangsa Delima; Jalan 34/26; Jalan 2/27e Jalan 4/27e Jalan 26/26; Jalan Renjang; Jalan 1/26	251; 252	Wangsa Walk Mall; AEON BiG Wangsa Maju; Plaza Wangsa Maju; Wisma Rampai; Taman Megan Setapak; Wangsa Delima Commercial Area; Wisma FELCRA; Wisma ITBM (Malaysian Institute of Translation & Books); Wangsa 118; Setapak Jaya Wet Market; Sri Rampai Lake Park; SMK Taman Sri Rampai; Abu Ubaidah Mosque; Darul Huda Mosque	
251	Jalan Ipoh; Jalan Pahang; Jalan Genting Klang; Jalan Usahawan; Jalan Kilang; Jalan 58/26; Jalan 42/26; Jalan 34/26; Jalan 1/26; Jalan Renjang; Jalan 2/27e Jalan 4/27e Jalan 26/26; Jalan Wangsa Delima; KJ4 Sri Rampai	T221; T222; T251; Chocolate Line	Wangsa Walk Mall; AEON BiG Wangsa Maju; Wisma ITBM (Malaysian Institute of Translation & Books); Setapak Jaya Wet Market; Rampai Business Park; Setapak Commercial Area; Setapak Industrial Area; Setiawangsa Sport Complex; Sri Rampai Lake Park; SMK Seksyen 5 Wangsa Maju; SMK Taman Sri Rampai; SRA Thabrani AU3; Sri Utama School; Abu Ubaidah Al Jarrah Masque	
Chocolate Line	PPR Desa Rejang; Wisma Rampai; Sunway Avila; Wangsa Walk; Flat Wangsa Maju Section 4 Fera Residence; Rampai Court; SMK Taman Sri Rampai; ITBM	251; T221; T222; T251	Wangsa Walk Mall; Aeon Big Wangsa Maju; Dataran Wangsa; SK Wangsa Jaya	

== Incident ==
On 28 March 2012, a 22-year-old man who was using the restroom suffered injuries to his thighs and the back of his body when the toilet bowl suddenly exploded. Investigations revealed that the explosive was a home-made firecracker. The victim spent a week in hospital.

== See also ==
- List of rail transit stations in Klang Valley
