= Tunku Abdul Rahman University of Management and Technology =

Nonprofit private university in Malaysia

- Universiti Pengurusan dan Teknologi Tunku Abdul Rahman (Malay) 拉曼管理与工艺大学 (Chinese)
- Former names: TAR College (1969–2013); TAR University College (2013–2022)
- Motto: Beyond Education
- Type: Non-profit institution Private university
- Established: 1969
- Chairman: Tan Sri Chan Kong Choy
- President: Chia Zon You
- Students: More than 38,000 (As of June 2026)
- Location: Kuala Lumpur, Malaysia; 3.215118°N 101.728345°E
- Campus: Kuala Lumpur Campus Penang Branch Perak Branch Johor Branch Pahang Branch Sabah Branch
- Website: tarc.edu.my

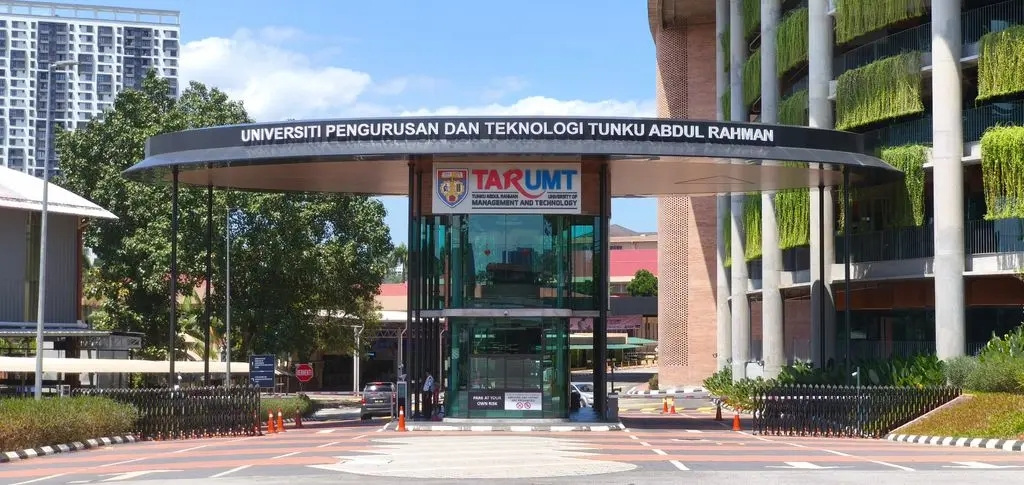
Main entrance of TAR UMT KL Campus

- Tunku Abdul Rahman University of Management and Technology in Simplified Chinese (top) and Traditional Chinese character (below)
- Simplified Chinese: 拉曼管理与工艺大学
- Traditional Chinese: 拉曼管理與工藝大學
Transcriptions
Standard Mandarin
- Hanyu Pinyin: Lāmàn Guǎnlǐ yǔ Gōngyì Dà Xué

Abbreviated name
- Simplified Chinese: 拉曼理工大学
- Traditional Chinese: 拉曼理工大學
Transcriptions
Standard Mandarin
- Hanyu Pinyin: Lāmàn Gōngyì Dà Xué

Tunku Abdul Rahman University of Management and Technology (abbreviated TAR UMT) is a non-profit, private university in Malaysia that is recognised as a Premier Digital Tech Institution by the Malaysia Digital Economy Corporation (MDEC), listed in the Competitive category of the SETARA Rankings, and the first institution to be named Esports Academy of the Year at the inaugural Malaysia Esports Awards.

Named after the country's first prime minister, Tunku Abdul Rahman, the institution was founded in 1969 as Tunku Abdul Rahman College (TAR College). On 2 May 2013, it was upgraded to TAR University College (TAR UC), and achieved full-fledged university status in 2022.

TAR UMT's alumni network consists of more than 330,000 alumni. TAR UMT is established in six (6) states in Malaysia, with a student population of over 38,000 students. The University has also formed partnerships with various international universities.

== Campuses ==
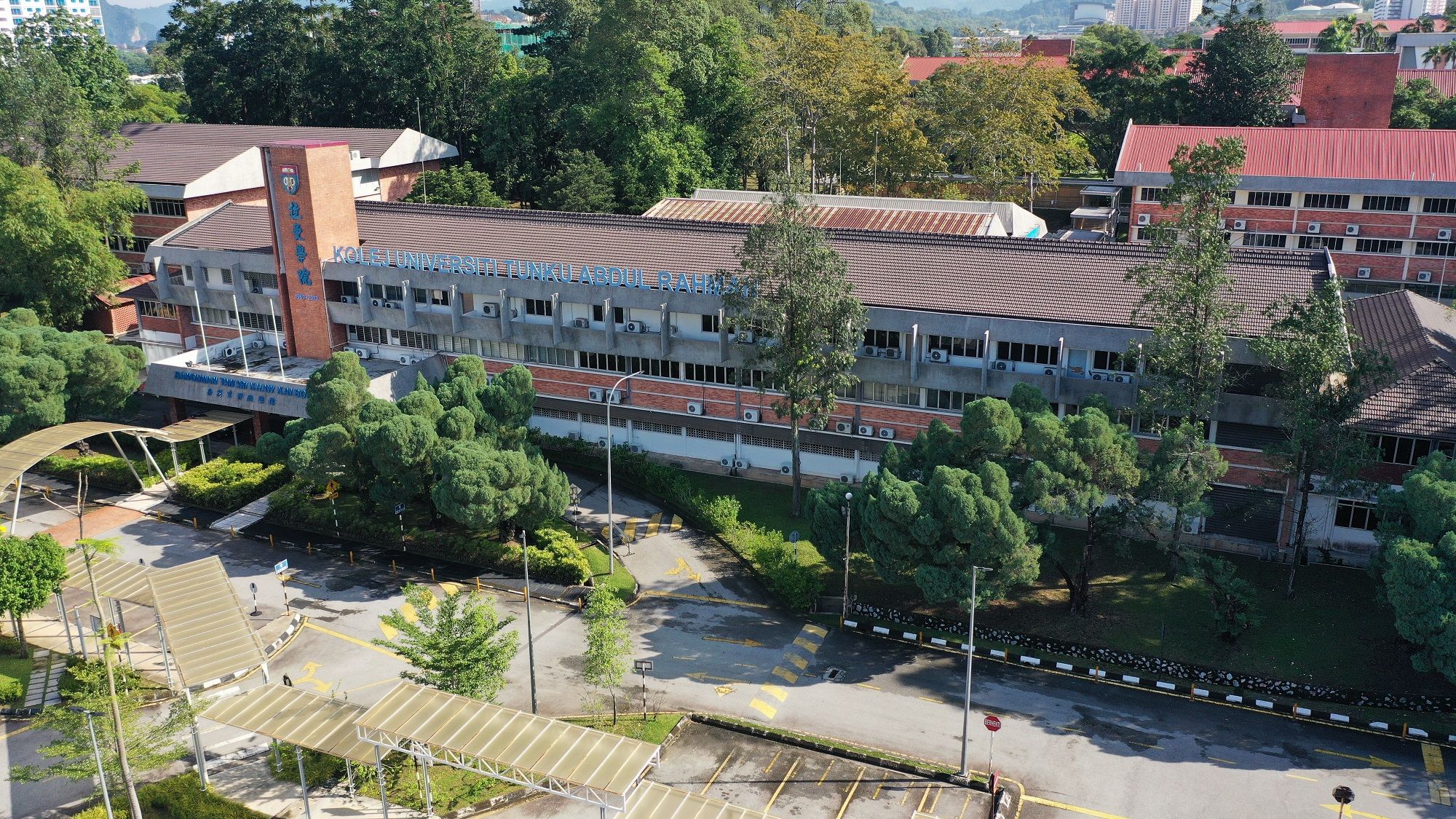
The University's landmark and first physical infrastructure at Kuala Lumpur Campus

TAR UMT's main campus covers 171 acres (69 ha) at Jalan Genting Kelang, located in Malaysia's capital, Kuala Lumpur. The university also has five branches across Malaysia, in the states of Penang, Perak, Johor, Pahang and Sabah. The first branch campus, in Penang, began at a temporary location in 1994 before moving to Tanjung Bungah five years later. The second and third branch campuses were founded in Kampar, Perak and Johor in 1998, and the Pahang branch was established in 1999. The Sabah branch was founded in 2002 in Sabah, East Malaysia.

== History ==
In the early years of Malaysian independence, there was a lack of opportunity to pursue higher education. An institution of higher learning was suggested by Malaysian Chinese Association president Tan Siew Sin. Tan initially suggested the Chinese-language Merdeka University, which was rejected by the government. As a compromise, an English-medium college was proposed. In April 1968, Tan appointed a working team (chaired by Khaw Kai Boh) to make recommendations for an institution of higher learning.

Its blueprint was submitted to the government, and received the support of Minister of Education Mohamed Khir Johari. The working team estimated that it would require RM 20 million to set up the college, and the government agreed to provide the financial assistance on a dollar-for-dollar basis. Prime Minister Tunku Abdul Rahman consented to the college being named for him.

TAR College began operations on 24 February 1969 with its School of Pre-University Studies and an initial enrollment of 764 students. A 15 September 1972 Instrument of Government provided the legal framework for the administration of the college. To raise funds for a campus in Kuala Lumpur, the MCA launched a national fundraising campaign in 1972 led by MCA publicity director Lee San Choon.

In February 1973, the government approved the allocation of land for the main Kuala Lumpur campus in Setapak. The ground-breaking ceremony was officiated by Rahman in August 1973. Phase one, including an administrative building, a library, two laboratory blocks, one large and eight small lecture theatres and a canteen, was completed in 1976.

Fundraising activities in the 1990s, such as the nationwide TAR College Fund-Raising Campaign, Taxithon, Walkathon, TAR College Torch Run and Motorthon, were led by TAR College Council chairman Ling Liong Sik. Expansion continued under the leadership of TAR College Council chairmen Ong Ka Ting and Chua Soi Lek.

Since its 2013 upgrade to a university college and 2022 upgrade to a full university, the institution has continued its development and expansion. The latest infrastructure development, a ground breaking ceremony for the construction of a new Student Centre at the Kuala Lumpur Campus was held on 30 October 2021. On 22 August 2024, TAR UMT celebrated the topping out ceremony of the new Student Centre. This milestone marks the near completion of the Centre which is intended to serve as a hub for student activities and entrepreneurial innovation.

On 19 September 2025, TAR UMT officially launched its new Student Centre called TAR UMT Arena. This state-of-the-art 1.5 million square feet facility now serves as a dedicated activity hub for the community for students and entrepreneurs alike.

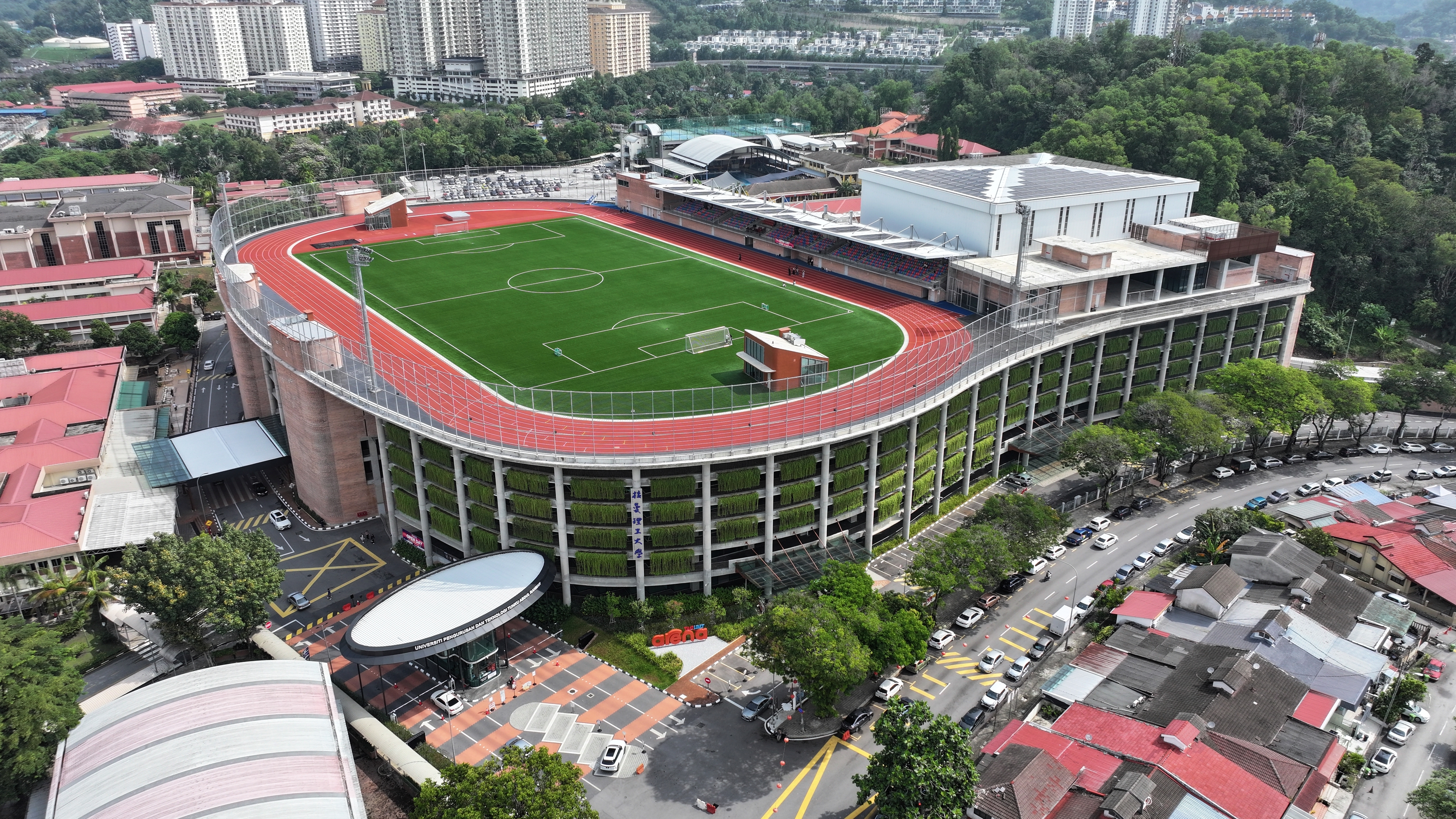
TAR UMT Arena - The latest facility in TAR UMT KL Campus

== Faculties ==
TAR UMT currently has 7 faculties and 1 academic centre (Centre for Pre-University Studies) that conduct its main academic programmes. The 7 faculties are:

1. Faculty of Accountancy, Finance and Business (FAFB)
2. Faculty of Applied Sciences (FOAS)
3. Faculty of Computing and Information Technology (FOCS)
4. Faculty of Built Environment (FOBE)
5. Faculty of Engineering and Technology (FOET)
6. Faculty of Communication and Creative Industries (FCCI)
7. Faculty of Social Science and Humanities (FSSH)

=== Faculty of Accountancy, Finance and Business ===
TAR UMT is the only institution in the world to conduct the Internally Assessed ACCA Fundamentals programme, and the only institution in Malaysia to be granted the Graduate Gateway status by the Chartered Institute of Marketing.

=== Faculty of Built Environment ===
TAR UMT is proud to be among the earliest private universities in Malaysia to have its real estate degree programmes accredited by the Royal Institution of Chartered Surveyors, UK (RICS). This accreditation reflects the University's commitment to delivering education that meets internationally recognized professional and industry standards. Students benefit from a curriculum that is aligned with current industry practices and global expectations, enhancing their competitiveness in both local and international job markets. It's Quantity Surveying and Construction programs are also accredited by the Chartered Institute of Building (CIOB).

== Institutional awards ==
TAR UMT has garnered numerous recognitions and awards from professional bodies, and industry leaders alike. Among them are:

- Premier Digital Tech Institution status by the Malaysia Digital Economy Corporation (MDEC)
- Competitive (Berdaya Saing) category of the SETARA Rankings
- Recipient of the Product Award and CSR Award at the Sin Chew Education Awards 2018/19
- Esports Academy of the Year at the Malaysia Esports Awards 2023
- Recipient of the SEEK People & Purpose Excellence Awards at the SEEK People & Purpose Awards 2026

== Notable alumni ==
- Chow Kon Yeow, Chief Minister of Penang (2018–Present)
- Chong Eng, Penang State Executive Councillor (2013–2023)
- Teresa Kok, Member of Parliament of Seputeh (1999–Present)
- Salahuddin Ayub, Minister of Domestic Trade and Living Costs (2022–2023)
- Teo Kok Seong, Negeri Sembilan State Executive Councillor (2018–Present)
- Liow Cai Tung, Johor State Executive Councillor (2018–2020)
- Gan Mei Yan, actress and host
- Karen Kong Cheng Tshe (龚柯允), singer
- Wayne Chua Poi Suan (蔡佩璇), actress
- Roger Tan Kor Mee, lawyer
- Chan Phei Yong, media personality
