= List of universities in Malaysia =

This is a list of universities in Malaysia. Universities in Malaysia are generally categorised as public and private universities. Private universities include locally established universities and campuses of foreign universities.

The list below is classified by the two main categories, sequentially ordered by their locations according to states. For the purpose of this list, institutions of higher education that are authorised to confer their own degrees but do not have the status of universities are included under the sub-classification of university college (including institutions not classified as educational institutions under the Education Act 1996). Other institutions of higher education which do not have the authority to confer their degrees are listed in a separate article. There may be some duplication in both lists as some institutions provide both bodies regulate accredited training and education in multiple sectors.

In the case of institutions without official translations of their names in English or common used name by the local media, the translation provided by the Association of Commonwealth Universities is used, barring which the most common usage is provided.

== Public universities and polytechnics ==
Public universities in Malaysia are funded by the Government and are governed as self-managed institutions. Apart from the University of Malaya and the MARA University of Technology which were established by two separate enabling Acts of Parliament, the other public universities in Malaysia were created by executive order as per the provisions of the Universities and University Colleges Act 1971. Until recently, the Ministry of Higher Education was responsible for seven institutions bearing the title "University College". These have since been upgraded to full universities, and there are currently no public university colleges.

For polytechnics in Malaysia, it provides courses for bachelor's degree, Advanced Diploma, Diploma and Special Skills Certificate.

Universities
Name in English	Name in Malay	Acronym	Foundation	Status	Location	Link
University of Malaya	Universiti Malaya	UM	1905 (as King Edward VII College of Medicine) 1949 (University of Malaya) 1962 (University of Malaya)	Research university	Kuala Lumpur (Main) Bachok, Kelantan (branch)	
International Islamic University Malaysia	Universiti Islam Antarabangsa Malaysia	IIUM	1983	International university	Gombak, Selangor	
Islamic Science University of Malaysia	Universiti Sains Islam Malaysia	USIM	1997 (as KUIM)	Islamic university	Nilai, Negeri Sembilan	
MARA University of Technology	Universiti Teknologi MARA	UiTM	1956 (as RIDA Training Centre)	Comprehensive university	Shah Alam, Selangor	
National Defence University of Malaysia	Universiti Pertahanan Nasional Malaysia	UPNM	1995 (as ATMA)	Focused university (Military)	Kuala Lumpur	
National University of Malaysia	Universiti Kebangsaan Malaysia	UKM	1970	Research university	Bangi, Selangor (Main) Cheras, Kuala Lumpur (Medicine) Jalan Raja Muda Abdul Aziz, Kuala Lumpur (Health & Pharmacy)	
Northern University of Malaysia	Universiti Utara Malaysia	UUM	1984	Focused university (Management)	Sintok, Kedah (Main) Kampung Baru, Kuala Lumpur (Postgraduate)	
Sultan Idris Education University	Universiti Pendidikan Sultan Idris	UPSI	1922 (as MPSI)	Focused university (Education)	Tanjung Malim, Perak	
Sultan Zainal Abidin University	Universiti Sultan Zainal Abidin	UniSZA	1980 (as KUSZA)	Islamic university	Kuala Terengganu, Terengganu	
Technical University of Malaysia Malacca	Universiti Teknikal Malaysia Melaka	UTeM	2000 (as KUTKM)	Technical university	Durian Tunggal, Malacca	
Tun Hussein Onn University of Malaysia	Universiti Tun Hussein Onn Malaysia	UTHM	1993 (as Pusat Latihan Staf Politeknik)	Technical university	Batu Pahat, Johor	
University of Malaysia Kelantan	Universiti Malaysia Kelantan	UMK	2007	Focused university (Entrepreneurship)	Pengkalan Chepa, Kelantan Jeli, Kelantan Bachok, Kelantan	
University of Malaysia Pahang Al-Sultan Abdullah	Universiti Malaysia Pahang Al-Sultan Abdullah	UMP	2002 (as UTEC)	Technical university	Pekan, Pahang	
University of Malaysia Perlis	Universiti Malaysia Perlis	UniMAP	2001 (as KUKUM)	Technical university	Arau, Perlis	
University of Malaysia Sabah	Universiti Malaysia Sabah	UMS	1994	Comprehensive university	Kota Kinabalu, Sabah	
University of Malaysia Sarawak	Universiti Malaysia Sarawak	UNIMAS	1992	Comprehensive university	Kota Samarahan, Sarawak	
University of Malaysia Terengganu	Universiti Malaysia Terengganu	UMT	1996 (as UPM Terengganu)	Focused university (Science and Technology)	Kuala Terengganu, Terengganu	
University of Putra Malaysia	Universiti Putra Malaysia	UPM	1931 (as School of Agriculture)	Research university	Serdang, Selangor (main campus) Bintulu, Sarawak (branch campus)	
University of Science Malaysia	Universiti Sains Malaysia	USM	1969	Research university	George Town, Penang (Main) Nibong Tebal, Penang (Engineering) Kubang Kerian, Kelantan (Health)	
University of Technology Malaysia	Universiti Teknologi Malaysia	UTM	1904 (as Treacher Technical School)	Research university	Skudai, Johor Jalan Semarak, Kuala Lumpur	

Polytechnics
Name in Malay	Acronym	Foundation	Type	Location	Link
Politeknik Ungku Omar	PUO	1969	Premier polytechnic (university status)	Ipoh, Perak	
Politeknik Sultan Haji Ahmad Shah	POLISAS	1976	Conventional polytechnic	Kuantan, Pahang	
Politeknik Sultan Abdul Halim Muadzam Shah	POLIMAS	1984	Conventional polytechnic	Jitra, Kedah	
Politeknik Kota Bharu	PKB	1985	Conventional polytechnic	Ketereh, Kelantan	
Politeknik Kuching Sarawak	PKS	1987	Conventional polytechnic	Kuching, Sarawak	
Politeknik Port Dickson	PPD	1990	Conventional polytechnic	Si Rusa, Negeri Sembilan	
Politeknik Kota Kinabalu	PKK	1996	Conventional polytechnic	Kota Kinabalu, Sabah	
Politeknik Sultan Salahuddin Abdul Aziz Shah	PSA	1997	Premier polytechnic (university status)	Shah Alam, Selangor	
Politeknik Ibrahim Sultan	PIS	1998	Premier polytechnic (university status)	Pasir Gudang, Johor	
Politeknik Seberang Perai	PSP	1998	Conventional polytechnic	Seberang Perai, Penang	
Politeknik Melaka	PMK	1999	Conventional polytechnic	Malacca	
Politeknik Kuala Terengganu	PKKT	1999	Conventional polytechnic	Kuala Terengganu, Terengganu	
Politeknik Sultan Mizan Zainal Abidin	PSMZA	2001	Conventional polytechnic	Dungun, Terengganu	
Politeknik Merlimau	PMM	2002	Conventional polytechnic	Merlimau, Malacca	
Politeknik Sultan Azlan Shah	PSAS	2002	Conventional polytechnic	Behrang, Perak	
Politeknik Tuanku Sultanah Bahiyah	PTSB	2002	Conventional polytechnic	Kulim, Kedah	
Politeknik Sultan Idris Shah	PSIS	2003	Conventional polytechnic	Sungai Air Tawar, Selangor	
Politeknik Tuanku Syed Sirajuddin	PTSS	2003	Conventional polytechnic	Ulu Pauh, Perlis	
Politeknik Muadzam Shah	PMS	2003	Conventional polytechnic	Bandar Muadzam Shah, Pahang	
Politeknik Mukah Sarawak	PMU	2004	Conventional polytechnic	Mukah, Sarawak	
Politeknik Balik Pulau	PBU	2007	Conventional polytechnic	George Town, Penang	
Politeknik Jeli	PJK	2007	Conventional polytechnic	Jeli, Kelantan	
Politeknik Nilai	PNS	2007	Conventional polytechnic	Negeri Sembilan	
Politeknik Banting	PBS	2007	Conventional polytechnic	Kuala Langat, Selangor	
Politeknik Mersing	PMJ	2008	Conventional polytechnic	Mersing, Johor	
Politeknik Hulu Terengganu	PHT	2008	Conventional polytechnic	Kuala Berang, Terengganu	
Politeknik Sandakan	PSS	2009	Conventional polytechnic	Sandakan, Sabah	
Politeknik METrO Kuala Lumpur	PMKL	2011	METrO polytechnic	Setiawangsa, Kuala Lumpur	
Politeknik METrO Kuantan	PMKU	2011	METrO polytechnic	Kuantan, Pahang	
Politeknik METrO Johor Bahru	PMJB	2011	METrO polytechnic	Johor Bahru, Johor	
Politeknik METrO Betong	PMBS	2012	METrO polytechnic	Betong, Sarawak	
Politeknik METrO Tasek Gelugor	PMTG	2012	METrO polytechnic	Seberang Perai, Penang	
Politeknik Tun Syed Nasir Syed Ismail	PTSN	2013	Conventional polytechnic	Muar, Johor	

== Private universities and university colleges ==
The establishment of private universities and university colleges were made possible with the passage of the Private Higher Educational Institutions Act 1996 [Act 555]. Before that, private institutions of higher learning existed but were not authorised to confer their own degrees. Instead, they acted as preparatory institutions for students to undertake courses of instructions in preparation for externally conferred degrees.

=== Universities ===
Name in English	Name in Malay	Acronym	Foundation	Location	Link
AIMST University	Universiti AIMST	AIMST	2001	Bedong	
Albukhary International University	Universiti Antarabangsa Albukhary	AIU	2010	Alor Setar	
Al-Madinah International University	Universiti Antarabangsa Al-Madinah	MEDIU	2006	Shah Alam	
Asia e University	Universiti Asia e	AeU	2007	Jalan Sultan Sulaiman	
Asia Metropolitan University	Universiti Metropolitan Asia	AMU	1997	Cheras	
Asia Pacific University of Technology & Innovation	Universiti Teknologi & Inovasi Asia Pasifik	APU	1993	Bukit Jalil	
Binary University	Universiti Binary	Binary	1984	Puchong	
City University	Universiti City	CityU	1984	Petaling Jaya	
Curtin University Malaysia	Universiti Curtin Malaysia	Curtin	1999	Miri	
DRB-HICOM University of Automotive Malaysia	Universti Automotif DRB-HICOM Malaysia	DHU	2010	Pekan	
GlobalNxt University	Universiti GlobalNxt	GNU	2012	Kuala Lumpur	
HELP University	Universiti HELP	HELP	1986	Kuala Lumpur	
Heriot-Watt University Malaysia	Universiti Heriot-Watt Malaysia	HWUM	2013	Putrajaya	
IMU University	Universiti IMU	IMU	1992	Bukit Jalil	
INCEIF University	Universiti INCEIF	INCEIF	2006	Kuala Lumpur	
INTI International University	Universiti Antarabangsa INTI	INTI	1986	Nilai; Subang Jaya; Kuala Lumpur; George Town; Sabah	
Islamic University of Malaysia	Universiti Islam Malaysia	UIM	2014	Cyberjaya	
Kuala Lumpur University of Science & Technology	Universiti Sains & Teknologi Kuala Lumpur	KLUST	1973	Kajang	
Limkokwing University of Creative Technology	Universiti Teknologi Kreatif Limkokwing	Limkokwing	1992	Cyberjaya	
MAHSA University	Universiti MAHSA	MAHSA	2005	Petaling Jaya Pusat Bandar Damansara	
Malacca Islamic University	Universiti Islam Melaka	UNIMEL	1994	Malacca	
Malaysia University of Science & Technology	Universiti Sains dan Teknologi Malaysia	MUST	2000	Petaling Jaya	
Management & Science University	Universiti Sains & Pengurusan	MSU	2001	Shah Alam; Kota Bharu; George Town; Kota Kinabalu; Kuching; Seremban; Sungai Petani; Kuala Terengganu; Ipoh; Johor Bahru	
MILA University	Universiti MILA	MILA	2011	Nilai	
MISI University	Universiti MISI	MISI	2011	Shah Alam	
Monash University Malaysia	Universiti Monash Malaysia	Monash	1998	Subang Jaya	
Multimedia University	Universiti Multimedia	MMU	1994	Cyberjaya; Malacca; Johor	
National Energy University	Universiti Tenaga Nasional	UNITEN	1976	Putrajaya	
Newcastle University Medicine Malaysia	Universiti Perubatan Newcastle Malaysia	NUMed	2009	Iskandar Puteri	
Nilai University	Universiti Nilai	Nilai U	1997	Nilai	
Open University Malaysia	Universiti Terbuka Malaysia	OUM	2000	Jalan Tun Ismail	
Perdana University	Universiti Perdana	PU	2011	Damansara Heights, Kuala Lumpur	
PETRONAS University of Technology	Universiti Teknologi PETRONAS	UTP	1997	Seri Iskandar	
Poly-Tech University of Malaysia	Universiti Poly-Tech Malaysia	UPTM	2023	Cheras, Kuala Lumpur	
Quest International University	Universiti Antarabangsa Quest	QIU	2008	Ipoh	
Raffles University Iskandar	Universiti Raffles Iskandar	RUI	2012	Iskandar Puteri	
Royal College of Surgeons in Ireland and University College Dublin Malaysia Campus	Royal College of Surgeons di Ireland dan Kolej Universiti Dublin Kampus Malaysia	RUMC	1996	George Town	
SEGi University	Universiti SEGi	SEGi	1977	Kota Damansara; Subang Jaya; Kuala Lumpur; George Town; Kuching	
Selangor Islamic University	Universiti Islam Selangor	UIS	1995	Bangi	
Sultan Abdul Halim Mu'adzam Shah International Islamic University	Universiti Islam Antarabangsa Sultan Abdul Halim Mu'adzam Shah	UniSHAMS	1995	Kuala Ketil	
Sultan Azlan Shah University	Universiti Sultan Azlan Shah	USAS	1999	Kuala Kangsar	
Sunway University	Universiti Sunway	Sun-U	1987	Subang Jaya	
Swinburne University of Technology Sarawak Campus	Universiti Teknologi Swinburne Kampus Sarawak	Swinburne	2000	Kuching	
Taylor's University	Universiti Taylor's	Taylor's	1969	Subang Jaya	
Tunku Abdul Rahman University	Universiti Tunku Abdul Rahman	UTAR	2002	Kampar; Sungai Long	
Tunku Abdul Rahman University of Management and Technology	Universiti Pengurusan and Teknologi Tunku Abdul Rahman	TAR UMT	1969	Setapak; Tanjung Bungah; Kampar; Segamat; Kota Kinabalu; Kuantan	
Tun Abdul Razak University	Universiti Tun Abdul Razak	UNIRAZAK	1998	Petaling Jaya	
UCSI University	Universiti UCSI	UCSI	1986	Cheras; Kuching; Springhill; Bangladesh	
UNITAR International University	Universiti Antarabangsa UNITAR	UNITAR	2011	Petaling Jaya	
University of Cyberjaya	Universiti Cyberjaya	UoC	2005	Cyberjaya	
University of Kuala Lumpur	Universiti Kuala Lumpur	UniKL	2002	Jalan Sultan Ismail	
University of Malaya-Wales	Universiti Malaya-Wales	UM-Wales	2013	Jalan Sultan Ismail	
University of Selangor	Universiti Selangor	UNISEL	1999	Bestari Jaya; Shah Alam	
University of Technology Sarawak	Universiti Teknologi Sarawak	UTS	2013	Sibu	
University Malaysia of Computer Science & Engineering	Universiti Malaysia Sains Komputer & Kejuruteraan	UniMy	2013	Cyberjaya	
University of Nottingham Malaysia Campus	Universiti Nottingham Kampus Malaysia	UNMC	2000	Semenyih	
University of Reading Malaysia Campus	Universiti Reading Kampus Malaysia	UoRM	2013	Iskandar Puteri	
University of Southampton Malaysia Campus	Universiti Southampton Kampus Malaysia	USMC	2012	Iskandar Puteri	
University of Wollongong Malaysia	Universiti Wollongong Malaysia	UOW	1983	Shah Alam; Damansara Jaya; George Town; Batu Kawan	
Wawasan Open University	Universiti Terbuka Wawasan	WOU	2006	George Town	
Xiamen University Malaysia	Universiti Xiamen Malaysia	XMUM	2015	Salak Tinggi	
=== University colleges ===
Name in English	Name in Malay	Acronym	Foundation	Location	Link
BERJAYA University College	Kolej Universiti BERJAYA	BERJAYA UC	2009	Pudu	
First City University College	Kolej Universiti First City	First City UC	1990	Bandar Utama	
GMI-University College of Applied Sciences	Kolej Universiti Sains Gunaan GMI	GMI-UcAS	1990	Kajang	
Han Chiang University College of Communication	Kolej Universiti Komunikasi Han Chiang	HCUC	1999	George Town	
IJN University College	Kolej Universiti IJN	IJNUC	2008	Kampung Baru	
Jesselton University College	Kolej Universiti Jesselton	JUC	1988	Kota Kinabalu	
Lincoln University College	Kolej Universiti Lincoln	LUC	2002	Petaling Jaya	
Linton University College	Kolej Universiti Linton	LINTON	1995	Mantin	
New Era University College	Kolej Universiti New Era	NEUC	1997	Kajang	
SAITO University College	Kolej Universiti SAITO	SAITO UC	1988	Petaling Jaya	
Southern University College	Kolej Universiti Southern	Southern UC	1990	Skudai	
Twintech International University College of Technology	Kolej Universiti Teknologi Antarabangsa Twintech	Twintech	1994	Bandar Sri Damansara; Kota Bharu	
UNITAR University College Kuala Lumpur	Kolej Universiti UNITAR Kuala Lumpur	KLMUC	1991	Jalan Raja Laut; Setapak	
University College Sabah Foundation	Kolej Universiti Yayasan Sabah	UCSF	2014	Kota Kinabalu	
University College TATI	Kolej Universiti TATI	UC TATI	1993	Terengganu	
Widad University College	Kolej Universiti Widad	Widad UC	1997	Kuantan	

== See also ==
- Education in Malaysia
- List of post-secondary institutions in Malaysia
- Ministry of Higher Education
- Malaysian Qualifications Agency
- Malaysian Qualifications Framework
- Department of Skills Development
- Lists of universities and colleges by country
