= List of post-secondary institutions in Malaysia =

This is a list of post-secondary institutions in Malaysia. Post-secondary education in Malaysia is organised upon the Malaysian Qualifications Framework and includes the training and education in the academic sector, vocational and technical sector, and the skills sector. Accreditation agencies include the Malaysian Qualifications Agency for qualifications in the academic and vocational and technical sectors, the Department of Skills Development (formerly the National Vocational Training Council) for the Malaysian Skills Certificate (Malay: Sijil Kemahiran Malaysia) and Diploma (Malay: Diploma Kemahiran Malaysia) qualifications as well as other recognised agencies like the Malaysian Nursing Board (Malay: Lembaga Jururawat Malaysia) and self-accrediting universities and university colleges.

The list below is classified by their regulatory authorities, segmented by their locations according to states. For the purpose of this list, institutions that bear the status of universities and university colleges as per the provisions of the University and University Colleges Act 1971 and the Education Act 1996 are listed in a separate article. There might be some duplication in both lists as some institutions provide accredited training and education in multiple sectors are regulated by both bodies.

== Ministry of Higher Education ==
The institutions listed here are regulated by the Ministry of Higher Education. State owned and managed institutions of higher learning are bolded in the list below.

Johor
Name in English	Name in Malay	Foundation	Location	Link
Aman College	Kolej Aman	1993	Batu Pahat	
**Bandar Penawar Community College**	Kolej Komuniti Bandar Penawar	2003	Bandar Penawar	
**Citipro Institute**	Institut Citipro	1998	Johor Bahru	
Cosmopoint International College of Technology, Johor Bahru	Kolej Teknologi Cosmopoint Johor Bahru	—	Johor Bahru	
Cosmopoint International College of Technology, Muar	Kolej Teknologi Cosmopoint Muar	—	Muar	
Crescendo International College	Kolej Antarabangsa Crescendo	2002	Johor Bahru	
Cybertek Technological Institute	Institut Teknologi Cybertek	—	Johor Bahru	
Darul Takzim Science & Technology Institute	Institut Sains dan Teknologi Darul Takzim	—	Kota Tinggi	
I-Systems College, Johor Bahru	Kolej I-Systems Johor Bahru	—	Johor Bahru	
Inai Technological Institute, Johor Bahru	Institut Teknologi Inai Johor Bahru	—	Johor Bahru	—
Informatics Institute, Johor Bahru	Institut Informations Johor Bahru	—	Johor Bahru	
Institute of Information Technology, Johor Bahru	Institut Teknologi Maklumat Johor Bahru	—	Johor Bahru	
**Ibrahim Sultan Polytechnic**	Politeknik Ibrahim Sultan	1998	Pasir Gudang	
Johor Islamic College	Kolej Islam Johor	—	Johor Bahru	
Johor Islamic Higher Education College	Kolej Pengajian Tinggi Islam Johor	—	Johor Bahru	—
KTC Accountancy Institute	Institut Akauntan KTC	—	Nusajaya	—
KTC Institute	Institut KTC	—	Johor Bahru	—
KTC Megah Institute	Institut Megah KTC	—	Kluang	—
KTC Professional Institute	Institut Profesional KTC	—	Skudai	—
**Ledang Community College**	Kolej Komuniti Ledang	2002	Tangkak	
Malaysian Institute of Management, Johor Bahru	Institut Pengurusan Malaysia Johor Bahru	—	Johor Bahru	
MARA Poly-Tech College, Batu Pahat	Kolej Poly-Tech MARA Batu Pahat	—	Batu Pahat	
Midas Institute of Technology, Batu Pahat	Institut Teknologi Midas Batu Pahat	—	Batu Pahat	
Midas Institute of Technology, Johor Bahru	Institut Teknologi Midas Johor Bahru	—	Johor Bahru	
Olympia College, Johor Bahru	Kolej Olympia Johor Bahru	—	Johor Bahru	
Omega Institute	Institut Omega	—	Johor Bahru	
**Pasir Gudang Community College**	Kolej Komuniti Pasir Gudang	2006	Pasir Gudang	
Reliance College, Johor Bahru	Kolej Reliance Johor Bahru	—	Johor Bahru	
RIMA College Johor Bahru	Kolej RIMA Johor Bahru	—	Johor Bahru	
Saito Technical College	Kolej Teknik Saito	1990	Pasir Gudang	—
SAL College Johor Bahru	Kolej SAL Johor Bahru	—	Johor Bahru	
**Segamat Community College**	Kolej Komuniti Segamat	2001	Segamat	
**Segamat 2 Community College**	Kolej Komuniti Segamat 2	2003	Batu Aman	
Southern College	Kolej Selatan	1990	Johor Bahru	
Strategy College, Johor Bahru	Kolej Strategy Johor Bahru	—	Johor Bahru	
Sunway College Johor Bahru	Kolej Sunway Johor Bahru	2004	Johor Bahru	
YPJ Community College, Batu Pahat	Kolej Komuniti YPJ Batu Pahat	—	Batu Pahat	
YPJ Community College, Johor Bahru	Kolej Komuniti YPJ Johor Bahru	—	Johor Bahru	
YPJ Community College, Kota Tinggi	Kolej Komuniti YPJ Kota Tinggi	—	Kota Tinggi	
YPJ Community College, Segamat	Kolej Komuniti YPJ Muar	—	Segamat	
YPJ Hospitality Institute	Institut Hospitaliti YPJ	—	Johor Bahru	
YPJ Industrial Technology Institute	Institut Teknologi Perindustrian YPJ	1996	Johor Bahru	

Kedah
Name in English	Name in Malay	Foundation	Location	Link
Alor Setar Professional Institute	Institut Profesional Alor Setar	—	Alor Setar	—
A. N. S. Technological Institute, Alor Setar	Institut Teknologi A. N. S. Alor Setar	—	Alor Setar	
**Bandar Darulaman Community College**	Kolej Komuniti Bandar Darulaman	—	Jitra	—
Daya Ilmu Technological Institute, Sungai Petani	Institut Teknologi Daya Ilmu Sungai Petani	—	Sungai Petani	
Hasani Institute	Institut Hasani	—	Sungai Petani	
Informatics Institute, Sungai Petani	Institut Informatics, Sungai Petani	—	Sungai Petani	
International Northern Higher Education Institute	Institut Pengajian Tinggi Utara Antarabangsa	PETUA	Alor Setar	—
**Kulim Community College**	Kolej Komuniti Kulim	—	Kulim	—
**Kulim Polytechnic**	Politeknik Kulim	—	Kulim	
Northern Management and Technological Institute	Institut Pengurusan dan Teknologi Utara	IPTURA	Alor Setar	—
**Sultan Abdul Halim Mu'adzam Shah**	Politeknik Sultan Abdul Halim Mu'adzam Shah	1984	Jitra	
**Sungai Petani Community College**	Kolej Komuniti Sungai Petani	KKSPE	Sungai Petani	

== Department of Skills Development ==
The institutions listed here are accredited centres of the Department of Skills Development. State owned and managed institutions of higher learning are bolded in the list below.

Kuala Lumpur
Name in English	Name in Malay	Foundation	Location	Link
VTAR Institute	Institut VTAR	1990	Kuala Lumpur	

Johor
Name in English	Name in Malay	Foundation	Location	Link
ADN Minda Management Services	—	—	Labis	—
**Advanced Technology Training Center, Batu Pahat**	Pusat Latihan Teknologi Tinggi Batu Pahat	—	Batu Pahat	
Alaf Baru Computer Centre	Pusat Komputer Alaf Baru	—	Batu Pahat	—
Aliran Mekar Automotive Engineering	Kejuruteraan Automotif Aliran Mekar	—	Batu Pahat	—
Apex Cosmeceutical Industries Sdn Bhd	—	—	Kulai	—
**Army Field Engineering Institute**	Institut Kejuruteraan Medan Tentera Darat	1957	Kluang	—
B. P. Top Beauty Training Centre	—	—	Batu Pahat	—
Baiduri Skills Centre	Pusat Kemahiran Baiduri	—	Skudai	—
Baiduri Technological Institute	Institut Teknologi Baiduri	2007	Pasir Gudang	
**Batu Pahat Technical Secondary School**	Sekolah Menengah Teknik Batu Pahat	1984	Batu Pahat	
Batu Pahat Technical Training Centre	Pusat Latihan Teknik Batu Pahat	—	Batu Pahat	
Clara International Beauty Academy, Batu Pahat	—	—	Batu Pahat	
Clara International Beauty Academy, Johor Bahru	—	—	Johor Bahru	
Darul Takzim Science & Technology Institute	Institut Sains dan Teknologi Darul Takzim	—	Kota Tinggi	
Dwi Karisma Sdn Bhd	Dwi Karisma Sdn Bhd	—	Batu Pahat	—
E-Access Engineering Training Centre	Pusat Latihan Kejuruteraan E-Access	—	Kulai	—
GIATMARA Centres in Johor	Pusat-pusat GIATMARA Johor	—	Multiple	
Grand Banks School of Yacht Technology	Sekolah Teknologi Kapal Pesiar Grand Banks	—	Pasir Gudang	
Hexa-Pro Education Group	—	—	Kulai	—
I-Systems College, Johor Bahru	Kolej I-Systems Johor Bahru	—	Johor Bahru	
Inai Comase Sdn. Bhd.	—	—	Johor Bahru	—
**Industrial Training Institute, Muar**	Institut Latihan Perindustrian Muar	—	Pasir Gudang	
**Industrial Training Institute, Pasir Gudang**	Institut Latihan Perindustrian Pasir Gudang	—	Pasir Gudang	
IT Base Skills Centre	Pusat Kemahiran IT Base	—	Batu Pahat	—
Jiba Institute of Technology	Institut Teknologi Jiba	—	Johor Bahru	—
Johor Skills Development Centre	Pusat Pembangunan Tenaga Industri Johor	1993	Pasir Gudang	
Kimipearl Beauty Sdn Bhd	—	—	Segamat	—
Kluang Technical Training Centre	Pusat Latihan Teknik Kluang	—	Kluang	—
**Kota Tinggi Technical Secondary School**	Sekolah Menengah Teknik Kota Tinggi	—	Kota Tinggi	—
La-Chito Beauty Academy	—	—	Skudai	
Lady In Beauty Point Sdn Bhd	—	—	Batu Pahat	—
Lai Lee Beauty School	Sekolah Kecantikan Lai Lee	—	Johor Bahru	—
Maju Institute of Technology	Institut Teknologi Maju	—	Senai	
Mind Protech Sdn Bhd	—	—	Pontian	—
**Muar Technical Secondary School**	Sekolah Menengah Teknik Muar	—	Muar	—
National Youth Skills College, Pontian	Kolej Kemahiran Belia Nasional, Pontian	—	Pontian	—
National Youth Skills Training Institute, Pagoh	Institut Latihan Kemahiran Belia Nasional, Pagoh	—	Pagoh	—
NB Beauty Spa Academy	—	—	Johor Bahru	
Polymuar Technical Training Centre	Pusat Latihan Teknik Polymuar	—	Muar	
**Royal Malaysian Police Technical College**	Maktab Teknik Polis Diraja Malaysia	2001	Bakri	—
SAL College Johor Bahru	Kolej SAL Johor Bahru	—	Johor Bahru	
Strategic and Technology Education College	Kolej Pengajian Strategik dan Teknologi	—	Johor Bahru	
Suria IT Centre	Pusat IT Suria	—	Masai	—
Systematic Training and Development Centre	—	—	Pekan Nenas	—
**Tanjung Puteri Technical Secondary School**	Sekolah Menengah Teknik Tanjung Puteri	—	Johor Bahru	—
Terimee Beauty Slimming Academy	—	—	Batu Pahat	
TNM Technomate Technologies Sdn Bhd	—	—	Johor Bahru	—
Top To Toe Beauty Therapy & Cosmetology	—	—	Johor Bahru	
**Veterinary Institute**	Institut Haiwan	1939	Kluang	
VSS Academy	Akademi VSS	—	Skudai	—
Yes Hair & Beauty Studio Academy	—	—	Johor Bahru	—
YPJ Building Technology College	Kolej Teknologi Binaan YPJ	—	Johor Bahru	—
YPJ Community College, Batu Pahat	Kolej Komuniti YPJ Batu Pahat	—	Batu Pahat	
YPJ Community College, Johor Bahru	Kolej Komuniti YPJ Johor Bahru	—	Johor Bahru	
YPJ Community College, Muar	Kolej Komuniti YPJ Muar	—	Muar	
YPJ Community College, Segamat	Kolej Komuniti YPJ Muar	—	Segamat	
YPJ Hospitality Institute	Institut Hospitaliti YPJ	—	Johor Bahru	
YPJ Industrial Technology Institute	Institut Teknologi Perindustrian YPJ	1996	Johor Bahru	

Kedah
Name in English	Name in Malay	Foundation	Location	Link
**Advanced Technology Training Centre, Kulim**	Institut Latihan Perindustrian Jitra	—	Kulim	
**Alor Setar Technical Secondary School**	Sekolah Menengah Teknik Alor Setar	1972	Alor Setar	
Clara International Beauty Academy, Alor Setar	—	—	Alor Setar	—
GIATMARA Centres in Kedah	Pusat-pusat GIATMARA di Kedah	—	Alor Setar	
**Industrial Training Institute, Jitra**	Institut Latihan Perindustrian Jitra	1990	Jitra	
Kedah Industrial Skills and Management Development Centre	—	1993	Sungai Petani	
**KEDA Training Centre**	Pusat Latihan KEDA	—	Sik	—
**Kulim Technical Secondary School**	Sekolah Menengah Teknik Kulim	—	Kulim	
**Langkawi Technical Secondary School**	Sekolah Menengah Teknik Langkawi	1990	Kuah	
**Malaysian Agricultural College**	Kolej Pertanian Malaysia	2007	Alor Setar	—
MARA Poly-Tech College	Kolej Poly-Tech MARA	1994	Alor Setar	
MARA Skills Institute, Alor Setar	Institut Kemahiran MARA Alor Setar	1971	Alor Setar	
**Ministry of Home Affairs Training Centre**	Pusat Latihan Kementerian Dalam Negeri	—	Alor Setar	—
**National Prawn Fry Production and Research Center**	Pusat Pengeluaran dan Penyelidikan Benih Udang Kebangsaan	1987	Kuala Muda	—
**National Youth Skills Institute, Jitra**	Institut Kemahiran Belia Negara, Jitra	—	Jitra	—
Strategic and Technology Education College	Kolej Pengajian Strategik dan Teknologi	—	Gurun	—
**Sungai Petani Technical Secondary School**	Sekolah Menengah Teknik Sungai Petani	1991	Sungai Petani	

== See also ==
- Education in Malaysia
- List of universities in Malaysia
- Community college
- Ministry of Higher Education
- Malaysian Qualifications Agency
- Malaysian Qualifications Framework
- Department of Skills Development
- Lists of universities and colleges by country
