= Universiti Malaysia Perlis =

Public university in Malaysia

Coordinates: 6°26′50″N 100°14′39″E

University of Malaysia, Perlis
- Universiti Malaysia Perlis (Malay) اونيۏرسيتي مليسيا ڤرليس (Malay) 马来西亚玻璃市大学 (Chinese) மலேசிய பெர்லிஸ் பல்கலைக்கழகம் (Tamil)
- Former names: Kolej Universiti Kejuruteraan Utara Malaysia
- Motto: Knowledge, Sincerity, Excellence
- Type: Public
- Established: 25 July 2001; 24 years ago
- Affiliations: ASAIHL; Global U8 (GU8); MTUN
- Chancellor: Tuanku Syed Faizuddin Putra Ibni Tuanku Syed Sirajuddin Jamalullail, Raja Muda Perlis
- Vice-Chancellor: YBhg. Lt. Kol. Dato' Prof. Ts. Dr. Zaliman Sauli
- Students: 14,000
- Location: Kangar and Arau, Perlis, Malaysia
- Website: www.unimap.edu.my

Universiti Malaysia Perlis (abbreviated as UniMAP) is a Malaysian public institution of higher learning located in Perlis. It was previously known as Kolej Universiti Kejuruteraan Utara Malaysia (Northern Malaysia University College of Engineering, abbreviated as KUKUM). It was established as the 17th Public Institution of Higher Learning in Malaysia on 25 July 2001. The first Vice-Chancellor is YBhg. Datuk Prof. Emeritus Dr. Kamarudin Hussin and the current Vice-Chancellor is YBhg. Lt Kol Prof. Ts. Dr. Zaliman Sauli. On 7 February 2007, KUKUM was upgraded to a full-fledged university and got its present name. Its logo, used since 2003, was rehashed as the logo of the University.

== History ==
UniMAP began its operations at a temporary campus in Kubang Gajah, Arau, Perlis on 2 May 2002. Curriculum development, physical development and recruitment activities began shortly after the appointment of the Vice-Chancellor and the Deputy Vice-Chancellor on 16 February 2002. The first intake of 119 students for the academic session 2002/2003 began on 20 June 2002.

Initially offering two programmes, UniMAP now offers six diploma programmes, 37 Bachelor's Degree programmes, 20 Master's Degree programmes and twelve Doctor of Philosophy programmes for almost 10,000 students. Located in the north of Peninsular Malaysia, UniMAP has a distributed campus with 30 locations across the state of Perlis.

== Locations ==
UniMAP permanent campus covers three locations:

- City Campus (Malay: Kampus Kota) accommodates the School of Environmental Engineering, School of Bioprocess Engineering, School of Business Innovation & Technopreneurship and School of Human Development & Techno-Communication.
- Nature Campus Pauh Putra (Malay: Kampus Alam Pauh Putra) covers 1,050 acres (420 ha). It accommodates the School of Manufacturing Engineering, School of Mechatronic Engineering, School of Microelectronic Engineering, School of Computer and Communication Engineering and the School of Electrical Systems Engineering. Also on the campus are the Engineering Centre, Centre for Industrial and Governmental Collaboration, Institute of Engineering Mathematics, the lecture hall complex, the multipurpose hall, residential colleges developed through a private finance initiative, an international-class go-kart circuit and the Syed Sirajuddin Areeb Putra Sports Complex.
- Unicity Nature Campus (Malay: Kampus Uniciti Alam) covers 300 acres (120 ha). It houses the Faculty of Engineering Technology, a residential college, and the institute of Sustainable Agrotechnology (INSAT) which runs nine greenhouses including two dedicated to Harumanis mango research.

== Rankings ==
Year	Rank	Valuer
2013	201-250	QS Asian University Rankings
2014	201-250	QS Asian University Rankings
2015	201-250	QS Asian University Rankings
2016	201-250	QS Asian University Rankings
2017	221-230	QS Asian University Rankings
2018	221	QS Asian University Rankings
2019	201	QS Asian University Rankings
2020	701-750	QS World University Rankings

== Partner Institution ==
=== Malaysia ===
- Universiti Tun Hussein Onn Malaysia (UTHM)
- Universiti Teknikal Malaysia Melaka (UTeM)
- Universiti Malaysia Pahang (UMP)

== See also ==
- List of universities in Malaysia
