= Ibrahim Sultan Polytechnic =

Technical school in Pasir Gudang, Malaysia

- Politeknik Ibrahim Sultan
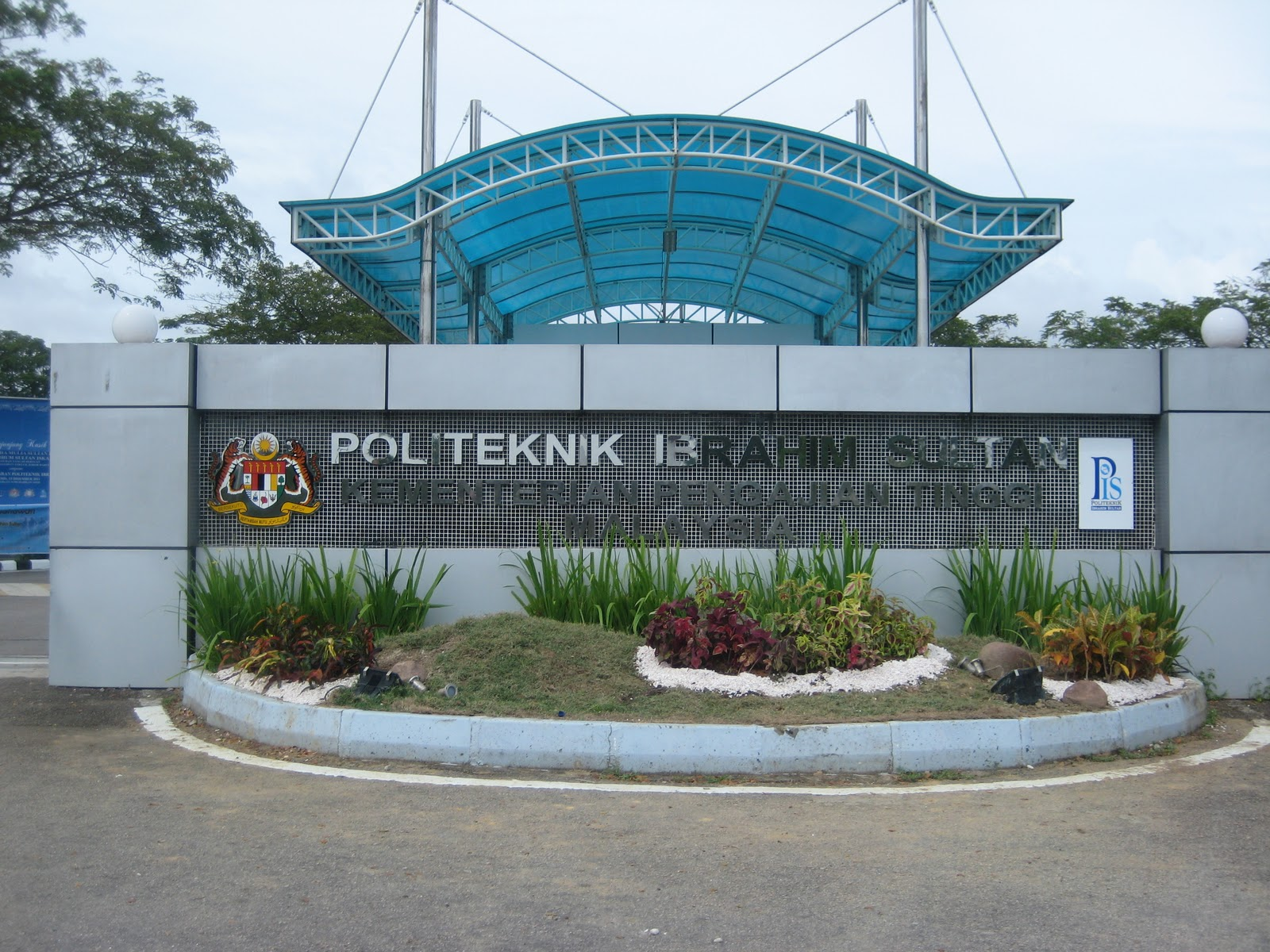
- Former names: 1998 to 2010 - Politeknik Johor Bahru
- Motto: Peneraju Ilmu Sejagat
- Motto in English: Global Knowledge Leader
- Type: Public
- Established: 2015 - University status 2010 - Premier Polytechnic status 1998 - permanent campus
- Affiliations: Asia Pacific Accreditation and Certification Commission
- Director: Hj Ulaimi bin Yahya
- Administrative staff: 542
- Students: 4,835
- Undergraduates: 3,974
- Other students: 861
- Location: KM 10, Jalan Kong Kong, 81700 Pasir Gudang, Johor, Malaysia, Pasir Gudang, Johor, Malaysia; 1°30′23″N 103°55′06″E
- Campus: Urban
- Colours: Blue Tiffany Blue; Gray White
- Nickname: PIS
- Website: https://pis.mypolycc.edu.my

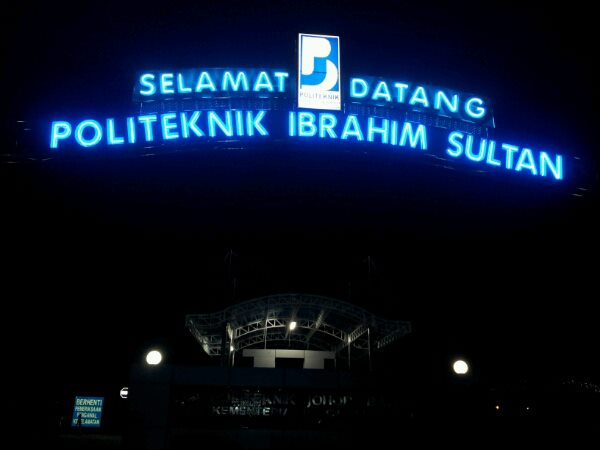
Night scene of PIS gate that still use the original logo of Politeknik Johor Bahru (PJB)

Ibrahim Sultan Polytechnic (PIS; Malay: Politeknik Ibrahim Sultan) is a polytechnic in Pasir Gudang, Johor, Malaysia.

The polytechnic specialises in engineering, communication design and hospitality, and offers 2-year skills certificate, 2-year diploma and 3-year degree programmes. PIS is organised into six departments: Mechanical Engineering, Electrical Engineering, Visual Design & Communication, Tourism & Hospitality, Science & Computer Science, and General Studies.

== History ==
PIS started as the Johor Bahru Polytechnic in February 1998 at the site of the former Johor Bahru Technical Secondary School. Planning for the polytechnic began during the 7th Malaysian Plan, in collaboration with the World Bank.

In July 1998, PIS moved into its current 100 acres campus in Plentong, Johor Bahru, which was completed at a cost of RM155.52 million.

In December 2011, Johor Bahru Polytechnic was renamed Ibrahim Sultan Polytechnic, in honour of the Sultan of Johor.

Between 2010 and 2015, PIS was upgraded twice by the Ministry of Higher Education, first into a Premier Polytechnic in 2010 and then a Premier Polytechnic (University Status) in 2015. As a Premier Polytechnic with University Status, PIS has greater autonomy than conventional polytechnics to determine its pedagogy and syllabus.

== Academic ==
Politeknik Ibrahim Sultan (PIS) has developed plantation chilli fertigation with its own brand of Poly Agro in Kulai.

== Ratings ==
=== MQA PolyRate 2013 ===
Politeknik Ibrahim Sultan was evaluated and given a rating in PolyRate 2013 and classified as Tier 6 which is Outstanding polytechnics in Malaysia.

This makes Politeknik Ibrahim Sultan as one of the best three of the 32 polytechnics in Malaysia until now.

== Achievement ==
Year	Competition / Event	Gold	Silver	Bronze	Total Medal
2012	Malaysia Technology Expo (MTE)	-	2	10	12
2012	40th International Exhibition of Invention, Geneva	-	2	-	2
2012	Innovation And Technology Exhibition (ITEX)	1	3	2	6

== Social responsibility ==
Politeknik Ibrahim Sultan social obligation to offer courses to people with disabilities (or in Malaysia formerly known as Orang Kelainan Upaya and OKU in acronym) to give them the opportunity to receive training appropriate to their ability.
