= Darren Teoh =

Malaysian chef (born 1981)

- Born: Darren Teoh Min Guo; 10 October 1981 (age 45)
- Education: IMI International Management Institute Switzerland
- Culinary career
- Cooking style: Malaysian cuisine
- Rating
- Michelin stars
- Current restaurants
- Dewakan; Bidou
- Awardss
- Best Chef Awards 2024; Best Chef Awards 2025

Darren Teoh Min Guo (born 10 October 1981) is a Malaysian chef and restaurateur. He is the chef patron of two Michelin stars restaurant, Dewakan, and Michelin-selected restaurant, Bidou. He is known for pioneering modern Malaysian cuisine with a deep emphasis on indigenous ingredients and sustainable sourcing. Widely regarded as a leading figure in Malaysia’s contemporary culinary movement, Teoh has earned international recognition for championing local produce and reinterpreting the Malaysia’s diverse food traditions. His restaurant, Dewakan, is the only two Michelin stars rated and Michelin green star rated restaurant in Malaysia, and was named into Asia’s 50 Best Restaurants in 2019.

== Early life ==
Darren Teoh grew up in Sea Park, Petaling Jaya in a mixed heritage household. He is of Chinese descent from his father side and of Indian descent from his mother side. He grew up in a household where cooking was an integral part of daily life. He began learning to cook at a young age by experimenting and improvising dishes in the kitchen. After graduation from secondary school, he enrolled into a culinary school locally in Malaysia at the encouragement from his father.

== Career ==
After graduating from culinary school, Teoh begun his career in restaurants like Breizh and Le Bouchon, which were among the top French establishments in Kuala Lumpur at the turn of the millennium. In 2001, with his lecturer's help, he would also went on to have a one-day staging at Saint Pierre in Singapore. The experience inspired him to move to Singapore to work for Les Amis Group, where he had stint working with Les Amis and its sister restaurant, Au Jardin. He returned to Kuala Lumpur after spending 5 years in Singapore.

Teoh went into teaching upon his return from Singapore, becoming a culinary arts lecturer first at Taylor's University, Berjaya University College, and finally teaching molecular gastronomy at KDU University College. During his time teaching, he also completed his Master of Business Administration (MBA) at the IMI International Management Institute in Switzerland. While studying in Europe, he had a short stint staging at restaurants such as Noma in Denmark and Restaurant Amador in Germany. His experience there exposed him to ingredient-driven and terroir-focused approaches to fine-dining cooking. In 2010, he published his molecular gastronomy book, Re-definition: Molecular Cuisine: Traditional Recipes through a Modern Kaleidoscope, which focuses on utilizing local indigenous ingredients in cooking.

In 2015, he opened Dewakan, a fine-dining restaurant that serve indigenous Malaysian ingredients on the ground floor of KDU University College campus in Shah Alam, which is part of an educational entrepreneurial effort in collaboration with the university. Dewakan later relocated to Naza Tower in Persiaran KLCC in 2019. Under his direction, Dewakan grew to become the first Malaysian restaurant to enter Asia’s 50 Best Restaurants. His restaurant obtained their first Michelin star in the first edition of the Malaysia Michelin Guide in 2022. They obtained their second Michelin star in the 2023 edition, becoming the first and only restaurant in Malaysian to obtain two Michelin stars. He was awarded with Two Knives rating in the 2024 Best Chef Awards, follow by a Three Knives rating in the 2025 edition.

== Published works ==
- Teoh, Darren Min Guo (2010). Redefinition : molecular cuisine : traditional recipes through a modern kaleidoscope. Selangor: August Publishing. ISBN 9789833317806.
