= Tunku Abdul Rahman University =

Tunku Abdul Rahman University can refer to:

- Tunku Abdul Rahman University of Management & Technology, also known as TAR UMT, also formerly known as TAR College (TARC) or Tunku Abdul Rahman University College (TARUC)
- Universiti Tunku Abdul Rahman, also known as UTAR
- University System of Tunku Abdul Rahman, an organizational body that includes 4 private institutions of higher learning in Malaysia
