= Pendidikan Moral =

In Malaysia, Pendidikan Moral (Malay for "Moral Studies") is one of the core subjects in the Sijil Pelajaran Malaysia (SPM) examination. It is a required subject for all non-Muslim students in the public education system in Malaysia. Muslim students are required to take the Islamic Studies (Malay: Pendidikan Islam) course. Pendidikan Moral, along with Islamic Studies, is governed by the Department of Islamic and Moral Studies (JAPIM), a branch under the Ministry of Higher Education.

== Syllabus ==
The core of the syllabus is the 36 moral values (called "nilai" in Malay). These values include "Kepercayaan kepada Tuhan" (creed), "Bertanggungjawab" (responsibility) and "Sikap Keterbukaan" (open-mindedness) among others. The 36 values are divided categorized into 7 major fields of study (called "bidang" in Malay), namely:

- Perkembangan Diri (self-development)
- Kekeluargaan (family)
- Alam Sekitar (nature)
- Patriotisme (patriotism)
- Hak Asasi Manusia (human rights)
- Demokrasi (democracy)
- Keamanan dan Keharmonian (peace and harmony).

These values are presented in detail in textbooks and form the basis of corresponding examinations. Each value is defined by the Education Ministry. Answering examination questions requires some interpretation of these definitions.

Students are required to provide exactly the same definitions of each moral value when answering exam questions. If a student misspelled or left out or word or rephrased the definition without changing its meaning, no marks will be given. Not fully memorizing the definitions is the reason why students always fail to secure an A+.

== Examination ==
Pendidikan Moral is often learned by rote. Teachers in schools tend to concentrate on answering techniques rather than the teaching material provided in the textbook. Instead of interpreting the appropriate value based on the information given, students are taught to look for specific keywords in the description and identify the corresponding moral value. Thus, strict memorization of the values is required without any emphasis on understanding or application. There have been suggestions to reform the system and incorporate other forms of assessment and not rely completely on written examinations but thus far, they have not been implemented.
