= Mata Pelajaran Umum =

Educational qualification in Malaysia

Mata Pelajaran Pengajian Umum (MPU, English: General Studies Subjects) is a pre-university qualification of general studies for private universities in Malaysia. It was formerly known as Mata Pelajaran Wajib (MPW). The Malaysian Ministry of Education officially announced the new modular system of MPU from 2014 onward. Those who undertake M.Sc or PhD will not be affected and are not required to undertake MPU. The MPU is set and run by Malaysian Examination Council, and examined by Malaysian Examination Syndicate, both of which are under Ministry of Education.

The Private Higher Education Institution Act 1996 (Act 555) provides that every private higher education institutions shall teach MPU as compulsory subjects. The Malaysian Qualifications Agency (MQA) requires all Malaysian and non-Malaysian students to complete the General Studies as pre-requisite for the award of a certificate, diploma or undergraduate degree. Foundation and pre-university students are exempted except Malaysian students who intend to pursue degree studies entirely overseas are required to complete the General Studies at Certificate level.

== Objectives ==
1. To promote nation building through consolidating and broadening knowledge about Malaysia.
2. To enhance the acquisition, mastery and applications of humanity skills.

The benefits of MPU subjects are:

- Balanced and wholesome combination of subjects
- Collaborative learning skills
- Leadership skills
- Project management skills
- Experiential learning

== Components ==
There are a total of 4 different components which are:

=== U1: Appreciating philosophy, values and history ===
Students must enrol into 2 modules with Malaysian students enrolling into Ethnic Relations and Islamic / Asian Civilization (TITAS). As for international students, students are required to enrol themselves into Malaysian Studies and Malay Language Communication 3. Each module is a 3 credits module.

=== U2: Mastering humanity skills ===
All courses here contribute to the development of the soft skills of the students. Students are required to enrol into 1 module with each module being either a 2 or 3 credits module. Among the courses offered here are "Human Relations", "Decision-Making", "Leadership and Interpersonal", "Innovative-Thinking" and "Time Management". Students who fail to achieve at least a credit in "Bahasa Melayu" at SPM level are required to take up "Bahasa Kebangsaan A".

=== U3: Broadening knowledge about Malaysia ===
Students are required to enrol into 1 course here and the courses offered here will be related to Malaysia. Each module offered here will be either a 2 or 3 credits module.

=== U4: Developing practical community-minded skills ===
Each student is required to enrol into 1 module here and each module is a 2 credits module. In MPU U4, students are required to organize an outside-the-classroom activity / project that will be monitored and verified by lecturer. Activities / projects planned must require the application of student's soft skills.

These Units are compulsory for both international and Malaysian students to take as it is in compliance with Section 43(3) Act 555 for the students to graduate.

== Curriculum Structure ==
Components	Undergraduate		Diploma		Certificate	
Components	Subjects	Credits	Subjects	Credits	Subjects	Credits
U1	2	6	1	3	1	3
U2	1	2-3	1	2-3	1	2-3
U3	1	2	1	1	1	2
U4	1	2	1	1	Nil	Nil
Total	5	12-13	4	9-10	3	7-8

== General Studies Subject Required ==
For Malaysian Students (Credits indicated in brackets)

Component	Undergraduate	Diploma	Certificate
U1	Tamadun Islam dan Tamadun Asia (3) Hubungan Etnik (3)	Pengajian Malaysia (3)	Pengajian Malaysia (3)
U2	One subject (2) in a component-related area such as leadership and interpersonal skills, writing skills, thinking skills and entrepreneurship OR Bahasa Kebangsaan (3) if without credit in SPM Bahasa Melayu		
U3	One subject (2) in a component-related area such as Malaysian economics, Malaysian government and public policy, and Malaysian banking and finance		
U4	Co-curriculum or community service (2)		Nil

For Non-Malaysian Students (Credits Indicated in brackets)

Component	Undergraduate	Diploma	Certificate
U1	Communication Malay 3 (3) Malaysian Studies (3)	Communication Malay 2 (3)	Communication Malay 1 (3)
U2	One subject (2) in a component-related area such as leadership and interpersonal skills, writing skills, thinking skills and entrepreneurship.		
U3	One subject (2) in a component-related area such as Malaysian economics, Malaysian government and public policy, and Malaysian banking and finance.		
U4	Co-curriculum or community service (2)		Nil

== Misconceptions ==
Although it is said that MPU is compulsory subject, only at certificate level when desire to further studies in other countries, students are able to choose whether or not to take on MPU as the subjects proposed are a basic requirement for Malaysia public universities or government career jobs, therefore Malaysian students who do not intend to work in health professions such as pharmacists, doctors, physiotherapists, etc. can choose to not take MPU as it does not require undergraduate students to work in government locations unless the students are thinking of working in a government facility. Malaysian students who want to go abroad for studies in health professions are required to take MPU subjects or else when graduated from foreign universities, graduates cannot return to register as a health professional in Malaysia.

Those who are undertaking STPM and Malaysian Matriculation Program are mandatory to take Pengajian Am (PA) which is general studies equivalent of MPU at certificate level, therefore does not require to take MPU.

Credits taken at different study levels which are undergraduate, diploma and certificate cannot be transfer as the subjects taught are non-equivalent to the other.

Foundation studies are in according to their own respective universities.

GCE A Level general studies and MPU are different.
