= Venkat Sumantran =

Indian business leader and academic

Venkat R. Sumantran
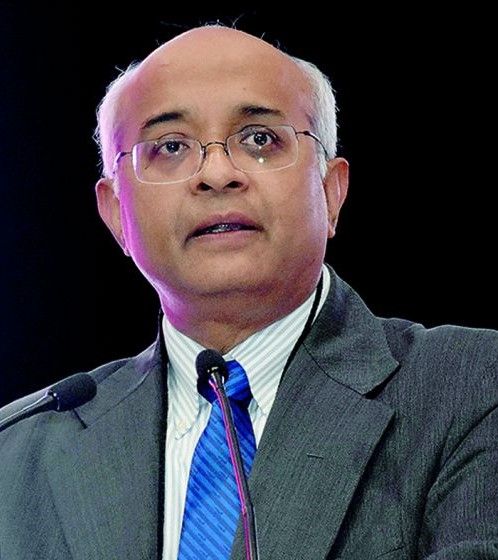
- Sumantran at Mainforum conference, Monterrey, Mexico in 2018
- Born: Venkataramani Sumantran; 1958 (age 67–68); Chennai
- Education: Indian Institute of Technology Madras (B.Tech, Aeronautical Engineering); Princeton University (M.S., Aerospace Engineering); Virginia Tech (Ph.D., Aerospace Engineering)
- Occupations: Businessman; author; academic
- Known for: Tata Nano

Venkat Sumantran is an Indian businessman, academic, and author. He has worked with the auto and mobility industry in the US, Europe, and India for over three decades. He is the Chairman of Celeris Technologies and a member of the board of directors for several organizations in the domains of automotive, electronics, and aviation. Sumantran is one of the inventors of the Tata Nano 1 lakh car. He was appointed as chairman of the board of IndiGo in May 2022.

== Education ==
Sumantran received a B.Tech. degree in Aeronautical Engineering from the Indian Institute of Technology Madras in 1981. He subsequently earned his master's degree in Aerospace Engineering from Princeton University in 1983 where his work involved stability and control of airships. He went on to receive his Ph.D. degree in Aerospace Engineering from Virginia Tech here he worked on low-speed airfoils suitable for the emerging class of remotely piloted aircraft.

== Career ==
Sumantran began his professional career at the General Motors Technical Center in Michigan in 1985. He returned to India and became executive director of Tata Motors Ltd. in 2001, where he was responsible for the fledgling Passenger Car business and simultaneously oversaw the company's Engineering Research Centre. During this period, his contributions to Frugal engineering were acclaimed in relation to his development of the Tata Nano – the car that gained global acclaim for low-cost innovation.

Later, in his role as vice-chairman of Ashok Leyland Ltd., he founded and was Chairman of Defiance Technologies Ltd, a subsidiary of Ashok Leyland that went on to help the Renault-Nissan Alliance develop the entry-level global car platform – referred to as the CMF-A architecture. In May 2020, IndiGo appointed Sumantran as independent director.

In May 2022, the board of IndiGo appointed Sumantran as chairman.

=== Academia, government, and industry bodies ===
Sumantran advises the Government of India as a member of the Consultative Group for Future Transportation at the Office of the Principal Scientific Advisor. He has served on the Science Advisory Council to the Prime Minister and on India's National Manufacturing Competitiveness Council. He has served as Chairman of the Confederation of Indian Industry's National Defence Council.

He has closely worked with academia and served on the Board of Governors of the Indian Institute of Technology Ropar. He is an adjunct professor at the Malaysia Institute for Supply Chain Innovation (MISI) - a joint initiative between the Massachusetts Institute of Technology (MIT) and the Government of Malaysia.

== Awards and honors ==
- Sumantran is an alumnus of the Indian Institute of Technology, Madras and awarded the Distinguished Alumnus Award in 2012
- He was named a Fellow of the Society of Automotive Engineers SAE International, the highest award for outstanding contribution to the automotive industry.

== Bibliography ==
He is the co-author of the book, Faster, Smarter, Greener: the Future of the Car and Urban Mobility, published by the MIT Press in 2017.
