= Community college (Malaysia) =

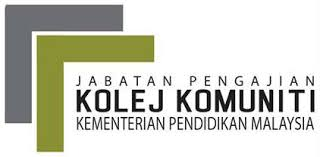
A logo of department of community college Malaysia, MOHE

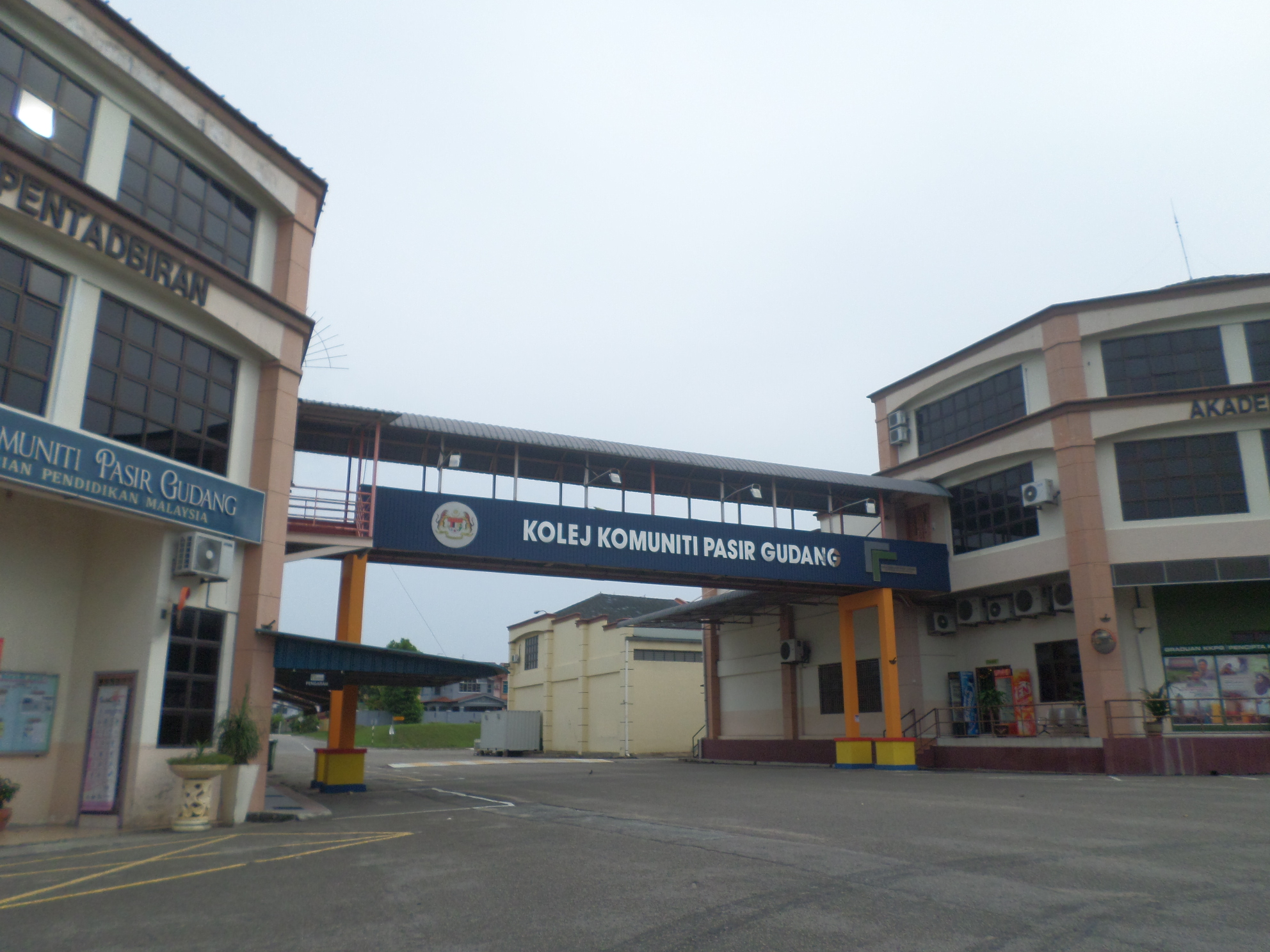
Pasir Gudang Community College in Johor.

The community college (Malay: Kolej Komuniti) system in Malaysia provides a wide range of Technical and Vocational Education Training (TVET) courses. Disciplines covered include accounting, architecture, construction, engineering, draughting, entrepreneurship, hospitality, personal services, multimedia, and visual arts.

Community colleges in Malaysia are administered by the Ministry of Education (MOE) via the Jabatan Pengajian Kolej Komuniti (English: Department of Community College Education).

Community college offering four type of programmes:

- Sijil Kolej Komuniti (English: Community College Certificate)
- Sijil Kemahiran Khas (masalah pembelajaran) (English: Special Skills Certificate (Learning Disabilities/ Difficulties))
- Diploma secara Pembelajaran Berasaskan Kerja (English: Work Based Learning Diploma)
- Pembelajaran Sepanjang Hayat (Kursus pendek) (English: Lifelong Learning (Short Courses))

== Background ==
In 2000, the Government approved a proposal by the Ministry of Education (MOE) to establish a network of educational institutions whereby vocational and technical skills training could be provided at all levels for school leavers before they entered the workforce. The community colleges also provide an infrastructure for rural communities to gain skills training through short courses as well as providing access to a post-secondary education. This institutions became known as community colleges.

Since the establishment of the first 12 pioneer community colleges in 2001, the number of community colleges across all states in Malaysia with the exception of the Federal Territory, has risen to 91 (as per Oct 2014). Community colleges are synonymous with Technical and Vocational Education and Training (TVET) as they provide a multitude of programmes that are based on TVET at certificate and diploma levels.

== Program offered ==
Community college offer 4 programmes which is;

- Sijil Kolej Komuniti (English: Community College Certificate)
  - The community college education system provides students with the opportunity of attending full-time and continuous programme for a duration of 3 semesters at community college. To fulfill the certificate, students are required to attend a 4–6 months' industrial training programme.
- Sijil Kemahiran Khas (masalah pembelajaran) (English: Special Skills Certificate (Learning Disabilities/ Difficulties))
  - The development of certificate for special skills is based on the needs of those with learning disabilities. The acquisition of knowledge and skills are important to empower them with a means to be more independent and capable of increasing their household incomes. This cert is in line with the need highlighted in the New Economic Model (Malaysia Policy) where the role of societal inclusiveness is emphasised.
- Diploma secara Pembelajaran Berasaskan Kerja (English: Work Based Learning Diploma)
- Pembelajaran Sepanjang Hayat (Kursus pendek) (English: Lifelong Learning (Short Courses))
  - Apart from offering full-time programmes, community college also offer short courses to fulfill the needs of the local communities. The aims are to inculcate interest, to motivate, to educate the community in Malaysia about lifelong learning and consequently to increase their standard of living through education.

== Tuition fees and Financial assistance ==
Tuition fees for certificate level is standard to RM200.00 (MYR) per semester. For Certificate's student financial assistance is offered by The Ministry of Education to help them bear the financial cost of programmes.

== Entry requirement ==
- Community College Certificate
  - Malaysian citizen
  - A pass in Sijil Pelajaran Malaysia
  - Other requirements as stipulated by MQA (Malaysia Qualification Accreditation)
- Community College Certificate (Special Skills)
  - Malaysian citizen
  - Applicants must have completed form five (5) in a Special Education School or Special Education Integrated Programme under the preview of Ministry of Education, Malaysia

== Community colleges by state ==
The original plan of the MOE called for the establishment of community colleges in every parliamentary constituency in Malaysia. Currently, community colleges have been established in the following locations:

=== Johor (7) ===
- Kolej Komuniti Bandar Penawar, Bandar Penawar
- Branch campus in Bandar Tenggara
- Kolej Komuniti Ledang, Tangkak
- Kolej Komuniti Pasir Gudang, Pasir Gudang
- Branch campus in Tanjung Piai, Pontian
- Kolej Komuniti Segamat, Segamat
- Kolej Komuniti Segamat 2, Batu Aman
- Kolej Komuniti Kluang, Taman Delima

=== Kedah (5) ===
- Kolej Komuniti Bandar Baharu, Bandar Baharu
- Kolej Komuniti Bandar Darulaman, Jitra
- Kolej Komuniti Kulim, Kulim
- Kolej Komuniti Sungai Petani, Sungai Petani
- Kolej Komuniti Langkawi, Langkawi

=== Kelantan (5) ===
- Kolej Komuniti Jeli, Ayer Lanas
- Kolej Komuniti Kok Lanas, Kok Lanas
- Kolej Komuniti Pasir Mas, Pasir Mas
- Kolej Komuniti Cawangan Rantau Panjang, Rantau Panjang
- Kolej Komuniti Cawangan Tanah Merah, Tanah Merah

=== Malacca (4) ===
- Kolej Komuniti Masjid Tanah, Masjid Tanah, website, https://web.archive.org/web/20170922030409/http://kkmt.edu.my/
- Kolej Komuniti Bukit Beruang, Bukit Beruang
- Kolej Komuniti Jasin, Jasin
- Kolej Komuniti Selandar, Selandar

=== Negeri Sembilan (5) ===
- Kolej Komuniti Jelebu, Kuala Klawang
- Kolej Komuniti Jempol, Bahau
- Kolej Komuniti Rembau, Rembau
- Kolej Komuniti Tampin, Gemencheh
- Kolej Komuniti Kuala Pilah, Melang

=== Pahang (6) ===
- Kolej Komuniti Bentong, Karak
- Kolej Komuniti Kuantan, Kuantan
- Kolej Komuniti Mentakab, Temerloh
- Kolej Komuniti Paya Besar, Gambang
- Kolej Komuniti Rompin, Kuala Rompin
- Kolej Komuniti Cawangan Raub, Raub

=== Penang (6) ===
- Kolej Komuniti Bayan Baru, Air Itam
- Kolej Komuniti Kepala Batas, Kepala Batas
- Kolej Komuniti Bukit Mertajam, Tanah Liat
- Kolej Komuniti Nibong Tebal, Simpang Ampat
- Kolej Komuniti Tasek Gelugor, Teluk Air Tawar
- Kolej Komuniti Seberang Jaya, Seberang Jaya

=== Perak (9) ===
- Kolej Komuniti Chenderoh, Kuala Kangsar
- Kolej Komuniti Tapah, Tapah
- Kolej Komuniti Grik, Gerik
- Kolej Komuniti Pasir Salak, Kampung Gajah
- Kolej Komuniti Sungai Siput, Sungai Siput
- Kolej Komuniti Teluk Intan, Seri Manjung
- Kolej Komuniti Taiping, Kamunting
- Kolej komuniti Bagan Serai
- Kolej komuniti Bagan Datuk

=== Perlis (1) ===
- Kolej Komuniti Arau, Arau

=== Sabah (8) ===
- Kolej Komuniti Tawau, Tawau
- Kolej Komuniti Semporna, Semporna
- Kolej Komuniti Lahad Datu, Lahad Datu
- Kolej Komuniti Sandakan, Sandakan
- Kolej Komuniti Kota Marudu, Kota Marudu
- Kolej Komuniti Tambunan, Tambunan
- Kolej Komuniti Penampang, Penampang
- Kolej Komuniti Beaufort, Beaufort

=== Sarawak (7) ===
- Kolej Komuniti Kuching, Kuching
- Kolej Komuniti Santubong, Kuching
- Kolej Komuniti Mas Gading, Bau
- Kolej Komuniti Betong, Betong
- Kolej Komuniti Cawangan Sibu, Sibu
- Kolej Komuniti Sarikei, Sarikei
- Kolej Komuniti Miri, Miri

=== Selangor (5) ===
- Kolej Komuniti Hulu Langat, Kajang
- Kolej Komuniti Hulu Selangor, Batangkali
- Kolej Komuniti Kuala Langat, Kuala Langat
- Kolej Komuniti Sabak Bernam, Sabak Bernam
- Kolej Komuniti Selayang, Batu Caves

=== Terengganu (1) ===
- Kolej Komuniti Kuala Terengganu, Kuala Terengganu

== See also ==
- Education in Malaysia
- Malaysian Qualifications Framework
- Vocational education
