= Kementerian Pendidikan =

Kementerian Pendidikan is a Malay term and may refer to:

- Ministry of Education (Brunei), a government ministry in Brunei
- Ministry of Education (Malaysia), a government ministry in Malaysia
  - Ministry of Higher Education, a government ministry for higher education matters
- Ministry of Education (Singapore), a government ministry in Singapore
- Ministry of Education, Culture, Research, and Technology (Indonesia), a government ministry in Indonesia
