= GlobalNxt University =

University in Kuala Lumpur, Malaysia

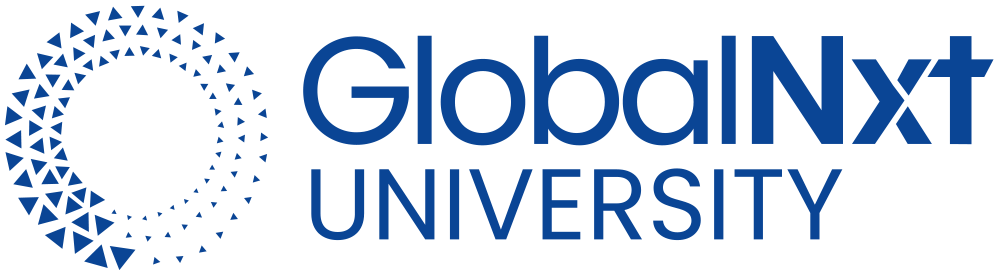
- Motto: Inspired By Learning
- Type: Private for-profit university
- Established: June, 2001
- Accreditation: Malaysian Qualifications Agency; Ministry of Higher Education (Malaysia)
- Affiliations: International Association of Universities; Association of Commonwealth Universities; AACSB International; EFMD
- Chancellor: Lord Syed Kamall
- Vice-Chancellor: Professor Zulkarnain Kedah
- Location: Level 10 Menara HLX, No. 3 Jalan Kia Peng, 50450 Kuala Lumpur, Malaysia; 3.1522°N 101.7138°E

GlobalNxt University, formerly known as Manipal GlobalNxt University and earlier as Universitas 21 Global (U21Global), is a private university with its academic headquarters in Kuala Lumpur, Malaysia. Its programmes are regulated and accredited within Malaysia by the Ministry of Higher Education (MOHE) and the Malaysian Qualifications Agency (MQA). The university is part of the UK-based GlobalNxt Education Group.

== History ==
U21Global Logo, (2001 - 2012)

The university traces its origins to U21Global, which was established in Singapore in June 2001 as a joint venture between Universitas 21, an international network of universities, and Thomson Learning, which later became Cengage Learning.

In 2007, Cengage Learning sold its 50 per cent stake in U21Global to Mauritius-based Manipal Universal Learning International for an undisclosed sum. In 2010, the shareholding of Universitas 21 was reduced to 25 per cent, with ten member universities continuing to hold equity.

In 2012, U21Global was re-established in Malaysia as GlobalNxt University, with its academic headquarters in Kuala Lumpur. The World Higher Education Database (WHED), maintained by the International Association of Universities, records the institution as having been founded in 2001 as Universitas 21 Global (U21Global) and becoming GlobalNxt University in 2012.

In 2018, GlobalNxt University was renamed Manipal GlobalNxt University under the ownership of the Manipal group.

In February 2025, the UK-based GlobalNxt Education Group acquired 100% shares in the university from Manipal. Following the change of ownership, the institution returned to the name GlobalNxt University in May 2025. The Malaysian Qualifications Register subsequently lists the institution as GlobalNxt University, previously known as Manipal GlobalNxt University.

In 2026, the university held its ninth convocation at the Sheraton Imperial Kuala Lumpur, celebrating graduates from 35 countries. Fifty-four graduates received doctoral qualifications through its Doctor of Business Administration and PhD in Education programmes. The convocation coincided with the university’s 25th anniversary.

Graduates at the university's ninth convocation in 2026

GlobalNxt University 8th convocation 2025

== Governance and leadership ==
The university is governed through its Board of Governors and Senate, with responsibility for institutional governance and academic oversight respectively.

In June 2026, Lord Syed Kamall was appointed Chancellor of GlobalNxt University. Kamall is a member of the House of Lords and has held academic and public-service roles in the United Kingdom.

GlobalNxt University is part of the UK-based GlobalNxt education group, which acquired the university from Manipal Education for an undisclosed sum. in February 2025. The group is headed by SM Shamrat as Executive Chairman and Chief Executive Officer.

== Accreditation and recognition ==
GlobalNxt University is recognised by the Malaysian Ministry of Higher Education, and its academic programmes are accredited by the Malaysian Qualifications Agency (MQA).

== See also ==
- Thomson Learning
- Cengage Learning
