= Dewakan =

- Interactive map of Dewakan

Restaurant information
- Established: 2015
- Owner: Paramount Corporation Berhad
- Head chef: Darren Teoh
- Food type: Malaysian
- Rating: Michelin Guide
- Location: No 10, Persiaran KLCC, Kuala Lumpur, 50088, Malaysia
- Coordinates: 3.154890851515775°N 101.718440457668°E
- Reservations: Yes
- Website: www.dewakan.my

Dewakan is a fine-dining restaurant in Kuala Lumpur, Malaysia founded and run by head chef Darren Teoh. The name is a syllabic abbreviation of two Malay words "dewa" (god) and "makan" (eat). Opened in 2015, the restaurant is known for its focus on refashioning local produce to produce new inventive local cuisine. It gained its first Michelin star in 2022, and its second star the next year, making it Malaysia's first and only two-Michelin-starred restaurant.

== Description ==
Dewakan began as a molecular gastronomy restaurant as part of an educational entrepreneurial effort within KDU University College, Shah Alam in 2015, where its head chef, Darren Teoh also taught. It relocated to its current premise in Naza Tower, Persiaran KLCC in 2019.

Dewakan specializes in modern Malaysian cuisine, which focuses on creating dishes centered on indigenous ingredients such as buah kulim and ulam raja, which were procured from around Malaysia.

In 2019, Dewakan was placed 46th on the Asia's 50 Best Restaurants list, the first and only Malaysian restaurant to receive the accolade. They repeated the accomplishment again in 2022. They were awarded a Michelin star in the inaugural Michelin Guide Malaysia, becoming one of the first restaurants in Malaysia to receive the award. They received their second Michelin star in 2023, becoming the first restaurant in Malaysia to do so. They received the Michelin Green Star in the 2024 edition of the guide.

== See also ==
- List of Michelin-starred restaurants in Malaysia
