= List of Michelin-starred restaurants in Malaysia =

As of the 2027 Michelin Guide, there are 10 restaurants in Malaysia with a Michelin-star rating.

The Michelin Guides have been published by the French tire company Michelin since 1900. They were designed as a guide to tell drivers about eateries they recommended to visit and to subtly sponsor their tires, by encouraging drivers to use their cars more and therefore need to replace the tires as they wore out. Over time, the stars that were given out became more valuable.

Multiple anonymous Michelin inspectors visit the restaurants several times. They rate the restaurants on five criteria: "quality of products", "mastery of flavor and cooking techniques", "the personality of the chef represented in the dining experience", "value for money", and "consistency between inspectors' visits". Inspectors have at least ten years of expertise and create a list of popular restaurants supported by media reports, reviews, and diner popularity. If they reach a consensus, Michelin awards restaurants from one to three stars based on its evaluation methodology: one star means "high-quality cooking, worth a stop", two stars signify "excellent cooking, worth a detour", and three stars denote "exceptional cuisine, worth a special journey". The stars are not permanent and restaurants are constantly re-evaluated. If the criteria are not met, the restaurant will lose its stars. The Malaysia Michelin Guide was first launched in December 2022 for the 2023 edition, covering Kuala Lumpur and Penang.

== Lists ==
Key
1 Michelin star	One Michelin star
2 Michelin stars	Two Michelin stars
—	The restaurant did not receive a star that year

Michelin-starred restaurants
Name	Cuisine	Location	2023	2024	2025	2026	2027
Akar	Malaysian	Kuala Lumpur – TTDI	—	—	—	1 Michelin star	1 Michelin star
Au Jardin	Contemporary	George Town	1 Michelin star	1 Michelin star	1 Michelin star	1 Michelin star	1 Michelin star
Auntie Gaik Lean's Old School Eatery	Peranakan	George Town	1 Michelin star	1 Michelin star	1 Michelin star	1 Michelin star	1 Michelin star
Beta KL	Malaysian	Kuala Lumpur – City Centre	—	1 Michelin star	1 Michelin star	1 Michelin star	1 Michelin star
Chim by Chef Noom	Thai	Kuala Lumpur – Bukit Bintang	—	—	1 Michelin star	1 Michelin star	1 Michelin star
Dewakan	Malaysian	Kuala Lumpur – City Centre	1 Michelin star	2 Michelin stars	2 Michelin stars	2 Michelin stars	2 Michelin stars
DC. by Darren Chin	French	Kuala Lumpur – TTDI	1 Michelin star	1 Michelin star	1 Michelin star	1 Michelin star	1 Michelin star
Molina	Innovative	Kuala Lumpur – City Centre	—	—	1 Michelin star	1 Michelin star	1 Michelin star
Terra Dining	Malaysian	Kuala Lumpur – TTDI	—	—	—	1 Michelin star	1 Michelin star
Potager	French	Kuala Lumpur – Segambut	—	—	—	—	1 Michelin star
Reference							

== See also ==
- List of restaurants
- List of Michelin Bib Gourmand restaurants in Malaysia
- List of Michelin-starred restaurants in Singapore
- List of Michelin-starred restaurants in Thailand
