= Malaysian Technical University Network =

Grouping of 4 Malaysian universities

- Abbreviation: MTUN
- Formation: March 2006; 20 years ago
- Headquarters: Malaysia
- Members: 4 universities
- Website: mtun.uthm.edu.my
- Formerly called: Technical University College Network of Malaysia (TCUN)

Malaysian Technical University Network (MTUN) (Formerly known as Technical University College Network of Malaysia, TUCN) was introduced on Mac 2006. In February 2007, TUCN has changed to MTUN due to rebranding of four College University name to University.

== List of institutions ==
Institution	State	Country
Universiti Tun Hussein Onn Malaysia (UTHM)	Johor	Malaysia
Universiti Malaysia Perlis (UniMAP)	Perlis	Malaysia
Universiti Teknikal Malaysia Melaka (UTeM)	Melaka	Malaysia
Universiti Malaysia Pahang Al-Sultan Abdullah (UMPSA)	Pahang	Malaysia

== See also ==
- University System of Tunku Abdul Rahman
