= University System of Tunku Abdul Rahman =

Malaysian organizational body for higher education

- Sistem Universiti Tunku Abdul Rahman (Malay)
- Abbreviation: USTAR
- Formation: 2014; 12 years ago
- Purpose: To promote vocational education in Malaysia
- Headquarters: Malaysia
- Members: 2 Universities and 2 Colleges: Universiti Tunku Abdul Rahman (UTAR); Tunku Abdul Rahman University of Management and Technology; TAR EC College; VTAR Institute

The University System of Tunku Abdul Rahman (USTAR) is the organizational body that includes 4 private institutions of higher learning in Malaysia. It sets goals to promote vocational education in the country.

Recently, committee members of USTAR paid a visit to Australia and Taiwan.

== List of institutions ==
Institution	Campus Location	Founded	Chairman	Status
Universiti Tunku Abdul Rahman (UTAR)	Selangor, Perak	2002	Tun Dr. Ling Liong Sik	University
TAR EC College	Kuala Lumpur	1993	Ong Lu Hong	College
Tunku Abdul Rahman University of Management and Technology (TAR UMT)	Kuala Lumpur, Penang, Perak, Pahang, Johor Bahru, Sabah	1969	Tan Sri Chan Kong Choy	University
VTAR Institute (VTAR)	Kuala Lumpur	1990	YB Senator Datuk Yoo Wei How	College

== See also ==
- Malaysian Technical University Network - An organization body of Malaysia Technical University (MTU)
