= KTG Education Group =

Private college in Malaysia

KTG Education Group, Malaysia
- Type: Private University college
- President: Lim Kean Tin
- Vice-Chancellor: Kamis Awang
- Location: Mantin, Negeri Sembilan, Malaysia
- Website: www.ktg.edu.my

KTG Education Group (Abbreviation: KTG Malay: Kumpulan Pendidikan KTG) is a private college in Malaysia. Its main campus is located in Mantin, Negri Sembilan. The college offers undergraduate and graduate degrees, including a master's degree in IT, engineering and business. KTG and Leeds Beckett University (UK) partner to offer a British qualification at KTG's main campus. The campus enrolls approximately 3,500 students, with about 30% of them from other countries.

== History ==
The group entered private higher education in the 1980s, under the name of Legenda Education Group. It established an integrated campus in Mantin in 2002. It expanded from a single institution to four sites, including one University College through acquisitions between 2003 and 2007.

The group offers more than 200 MOHE approved courses of which 60 are fully accredited by MQA in engineering, quantity surveying, architecture, construction management, information technology, computer science, business, accounting, art and design and nursing. Degree and master levels enroll about 5,300 students. More than 30,000 students have graduated from KTG colleges since its inception.

The university collaborates with international strategic partners including, the University of East London (UEL), Coventry University, Leeds Beckett University (LBU) and Bolton University (UOB).

== Colleges ==
KTG colleges are Private Higher Education Institutes (PHEI) licensed under the Private Higher Education Act 1996.

Linton University College (Kolej Universiti Linton ) (formerly Linton College) was established in 1985 in Ipoh, Perak. It specialises in engineering, construction management, information technology and business. In 2005, Linton College was acquired by KTG and was relocated to the integrated campus in Mantin.

Linton College has a long-term association with the UEL and Coventry University that provide it a platform to offer internationally recognised franchised programmes. It previously offered engineering degree courses from Nottingham Trent University. In March 2010, Linton College attained university college status and was renamed Linton University College.

ITP (Institut Teknologi Pertama) was established in Kuala Lumpur in 1986 and was acquired by KTG in 2003. It offers programmes in engineering, built environment, computing and business. In 1991, it became the first college to offer Edexcel HND programmes in Malaysia, thus pioneering outcome-based technical and vocational higher education in Malaysia. It also offers franchised programmes from UEL. ITP became independent of the group in 2009.

Institut Jati was founded in 1988 in Seremban, Negeri Sembilan and became a part of KTG in 2004. It specialises in professional courses in accounting and business in collaboration with Association of International Accountants. It partners with UEL and Coventry University in offering franchised degree courses and HND programmes with Edexcel. Jati offers design and visual arts programs.

The Institute of Medical Science Mantin (Institut Sains Perubataan Mantin) was established in 1996 as Institut Mutiara Mopar in Seremban, Negeri Sembilan. It offers diploma courses in information technology and business. In 2007, it was acquired by KTG and relocated to the LEG campus in Mantin. It changed its focus towards offering allied health and medical sciences courses. IMM now has more than 300 nursing students.
