= Tun Hussein Onn University of Malaysia =

University in Malaysia

Coordinates: 1°51′11″N 103°05′11″E

- Universiti Tun Hussein Onn Malaysia (Malay)
- Motto: Malay: Dengan Hikmah Kita Meneroka
- Motto in English: With Wisdom, We Explore
- Type: Public
- Established: 1993; 33 years ago
- Academic affiliations: MTUN
- Chancellor: Tunku Ismail Sultan Ibrahim; Regent of Johor
- Vice-Chancellor: Mas Fawzi bin Mohd Ali
- Pro-chancellors: # Ibni Sultan Ibrahim Tunku Temenggong of Johor; 1. Azmi Rohani Datuk Pengelola Bijaya Diraja Istana Negara
- Students: 24,739 (February 2025)
- Location: 86400 Parit Raja, Batu Pahat, Johor, Malaysia
- Campus: Rural
- Colours: Red, blue and silver
- Website: www.uthm.edu.my

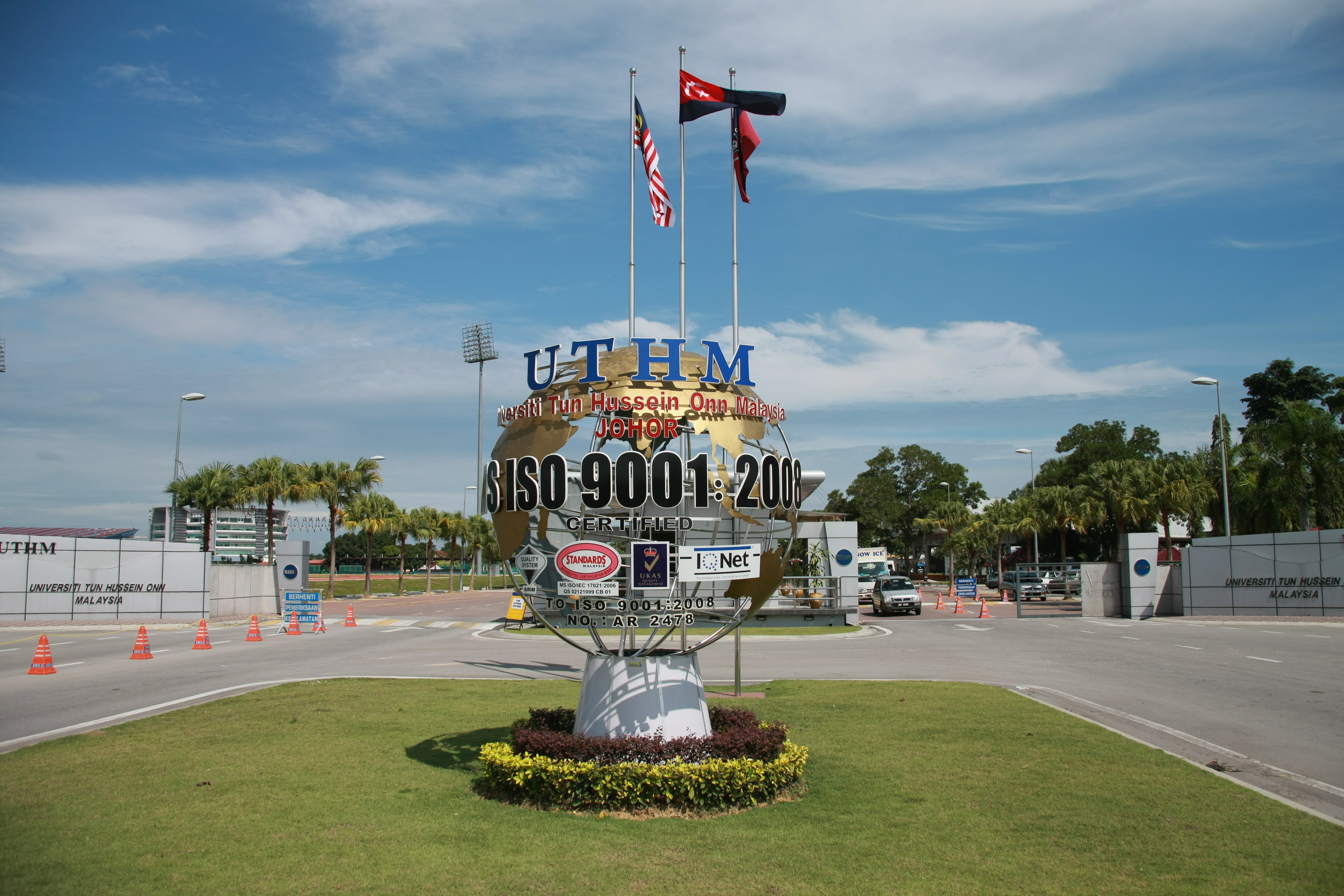
UTHM entrance

Tun Hussein Onn University of Malaysia (Malay: Universiti Tun Hussein Onn Malaysia; abbreviated as UTHM) is a public university in Batu Pahat, Johor, Malaysia. It was formerly known as the Tun Hussein Onn Institute of Technology (Malay: Institut Teknologi Tun Hussein Onn (ITTHO)) and the Tun Hussein Onn University College of Technology (Malay: Kolej Universiti Teknologi Tun Hussein Onn (KUiTTHO)). Along with other public university colleges, KUiTTHO was promoted to full university status since year 2007. The name UTHM was officially launched by the then education minister, Dato' Seri Hishammuddin Bin Tun Hussein.

UTHM is also a member of Malaysian Technical University Network (MTUN).

== History ==
=== Establishment ===
The establishment history of Universiti Tun Hussein Onn Malaysia started off on 16 September 1993.The university was formerly known as Pusat Latihan Staf Politeknik (PLSP). The core business of PLSP then was to train and produce polytechnics academic staff in various engineering fields. The training institute was jointly administered by Universiti Teknologi Malaysia and the Ministry of Education Malaysia.

Three years later, PLSP was upgraded to Institut Teknologi Tun Hussein Onn (ITTHO). This promotion is an acknowledgment to the institution that has excelled in producing human resources for technical education.

On 27 September 2000, the institute achieved another milestone when the Malaysian government agreed to award a university-college status to the institute. This was to recognise its contributions in science and technology-based development as well as in helping the nation to achieve its aspiration. With the new status, the institution was known as Kolej Universiti Teknologi Tun Hussein Onn (KUiTTHO) and the official announcement was made by Musa Mohamed, the then Minister of Education.

The Malaysian government, on 20 September 2006, agreed to award the university-college a full university status and changed its name to Universiti Tun Hussein Onn Malaysia. On 1 February 2007, Mustapa Mohamed, the Minister of Higher Education officially announced the change of status. Subsequently, Hishamuddin Hussein then made the official declaration of the change of name on 2 March 2007.

=== Changes of names ===
- Pusat Latihan Staf Politeknik (PLSP) - 1993
- Institut Teknologi Tun Hussein Onn (ITTHO) - 1996
- Kolej Universiti Teknologi Tun Hussein Onn (KUiTTHO) - 2000
- Universiti Tun Hussein Onn Malaysia (UTHM) - 2007

=== Campuses Location ===
- UTHM Main Campus (Batu Pahat, Johor)
- UTHM Pagoh Branch (Muar, Johor)

== Residential colleges ==
At UTHM, hostels for students are called "Kolej Kediaman" ("residential college"), or "KK". This term was first used when the institution received its "university" title. The former term was "desasiswa" ("hostel"). Prior to 2022, there are eight separate residential colleges. However, as of 2022 the residential colleges have been reorganised as follows.

- KK Dalam Kampus Parit Raja
- KK Luar Kampus Parit Raja
- KK Kampus Pagoh

== Tunku Tun Aminah Library ==
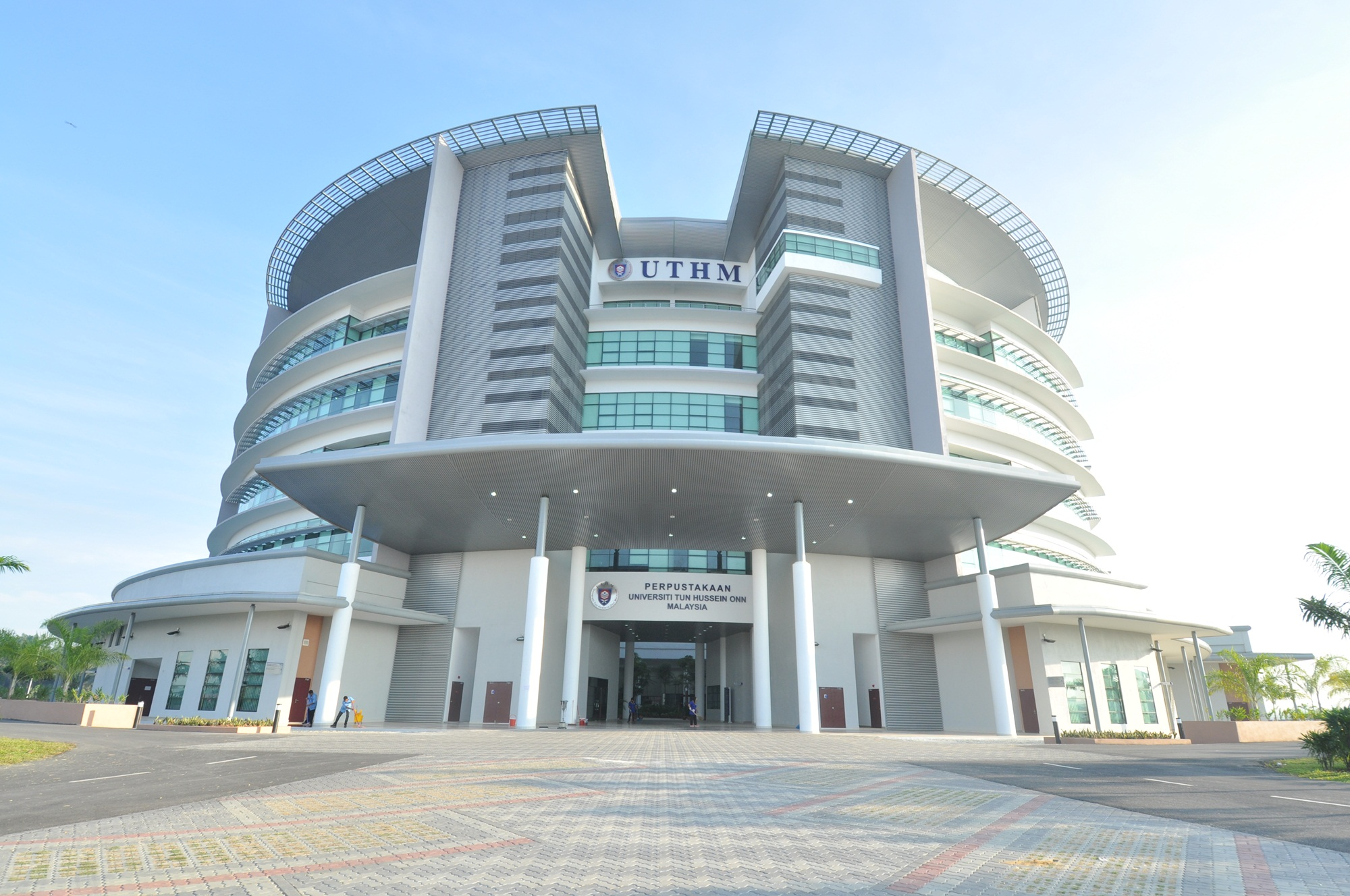
Tunku Tun Aminah Library

The Tunku Tun Aminah Library is one of the largest academic libraries in Malaysia. The building has four floors, with 16,000 square meters of total floor area. It can accommodate as many as 300,000 books and 3,000 users.

The library has 100 carrel rooms, 40 discussion rooms, 2 seminar rooms, a postgraduate research room, an auditorium, a closed reference room, a journal room and a 24-hour reading room. It provides a variety reference sources including printed and electronic material, especially in the areas of civil engineering, electrical engineering, mechanical engineering, information technology, education, science, social sciences, management and languages. The library has more than 200,000 books, 10,000 titles of these, 40 titles of printed journals, 380 titles of e-journals, 50 titles of magazines, and 22,000 items of audio-visual material. The library also subscribes to 26 online databases services with access to more than 120,000 journal titles and 4 e-books services giving access to 80,000 titles of books.

The library initiated an automation project in 1997. Currently, the library is using the SirsiDynix Symphony integrated library system to manage its operations, automate tasks and improve staff productivity.

== Rankings ==
Year	Rank	Valuer
2012	251-300	QS Asian University Rankings
2013	251-300	QS Asian University Rankings
2014	251-300	QS Asian University Rankings
2015	251-300	QS Asian University Rankings

== See also ==
- List of universities in Malaysia
