= Universiti Malaysia Pahang Al-Sultan Abdullah =

Public university in Malaysia

Coordinates: 3°32′35″N 103°26′10″E

- Emblem
- Other name: UMPSA
- Former names: University College of Engineering and Technology Malaysia (2002–2007); Universiti Malaysia Pahang (2007–2022)
- Motto: Kejuruteraan, Teknologi, Kreativiti
- Motto in English: Engineering, Technology, Creativity
- Type: Public technical university
- Established: 16 February 2002; 24 years ago
- Affiliations: ASAIHL; MTUN
- Budget: MYR 224,020,000
- Chancellor: Al-Sultan Abdullah Ri'ayatuddin Al-Mustafa Billah Shah
- Vice-Chancellor: Yatimah Alias
- Academic staff: 814
- Administrative staff: 992
- Students: 17925
- Undergraduates: 10835
- Postgraduates: 1423
- Location: Pekan, Pahang, Malaysia
- Campus: Multiple Sites
- Website: umpsa.edu.my

Universiti Malaysia Pahang Al-Sultan Abdullah (formerly known as Universiti Malaysia Pahang, abbreviated as UMP), abbreviated as UMPSA, is a public university in Pahang, Malaysia. UMPSA was founded as University College of Engineering and Technology Malaysia (Malay: Kolej Universiti Kejuruteraan dan Teknologi Malaysia), abbreviated as UTEC or KUKTEM.

On 28 November 2015, UMPSA had been granted autonomous status where control over financial, human resources and administration had been fully passed to the university.

== History ==
UMPSA was initially suggested to be a branch campus for Universiti Teknologi Malaysia. The campus were formed in 1999 at Kuantan. It was then established as a public technical university by the Prime Minister Mahathir Mohamad's cabinet on 16 February 2002. Incorporated under the Universities and University Colleges Act 1971 by the Royal Decree of His Majesty the Yang Di-Pertuan Agong, University College of Engineering and Technology Malaysia (UTEC) was set up as a technical university, specialising in engineering and technology. The university college operates on a temporary campus in Gambang, Pahang. The temporary campus was formerly an industrial complex owned by Malaysia Electric Corporation (MEC). The university's permanent campus is located in Pekan, which was under construction before the year of 2009.

On 20 September 2006, the Malaysian government agreed to rename University College of Engineering and Technology Malaysia (UTEC) to Universiti Malaysia Pahang (UMP), with the change coming into effect on 1 February 2007.

Emblem of the University College of Engineering and Technology Malaysia (2002–2007)

The university renamed to Universiti Malaysia Pahang Al-Sultan Abdullah on 14 April 2023, in honor for 16th Yang di-Pertuan Agong and current Sultan of Pahang, Sultan Abdullah.

== UMPSA Pekan Campus ==
UMPSA main campus in Pekan began its operation on 27 July 2009. The campus can accommodate up to 10,000 students and 2,000 staff.

The campus is home to four engineering faculties and one centre as follows;

- Faculty of Electrical and Electronics Engineering
- Faculty of Mechanical and Automotive Engineering Technology
- Faculty of Manufacturing and Mechatronic Engineering Technology
- Faculty of Computing
- Centre for Modern Languages.

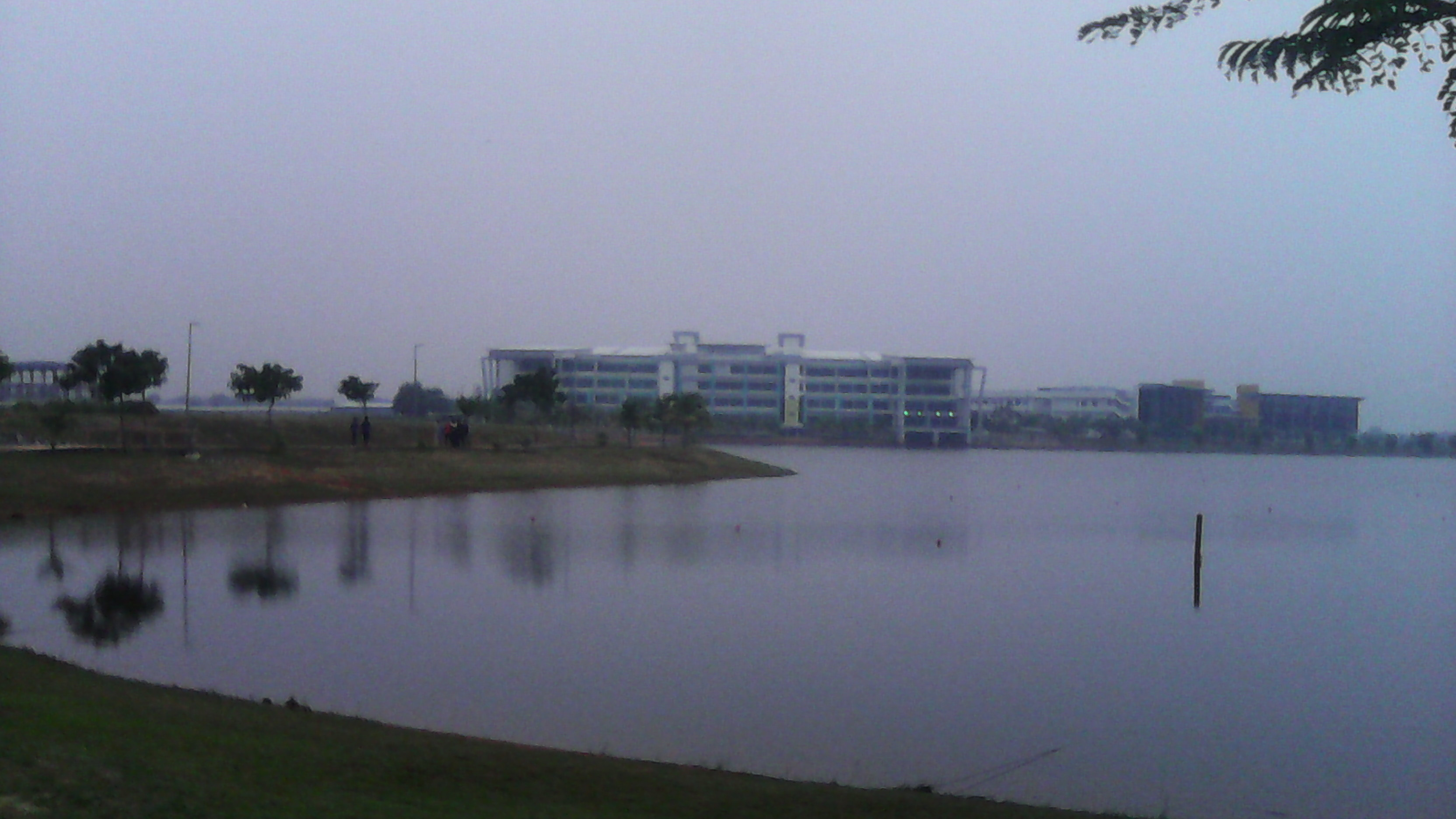
UMP Pekan Library in front of the Lake.

== Rankings ==
| Year | Rank | Value |
|---|---|---|
| 2013 | 251-300 | QS Asian University Rankings |
| 2014 | 251-300 | QS Asian University Rankings |
| 2015 | 251-300 | QS Asian University Rankings |
| 2016 | 251-300 | QS Asian University Rankings |
| 2017 | 251-300 | QS Asian University Rankings |
| 2018 | 281-290 | QS Asian University Rankings |
| 2019 | 188 | QS Asian University Rankings |
| 2020 | 134 | QS Asian University Rankings |
| 2021 | 133 | QS Asian University Rankings |
| 2022 | 129 | QS Asian University Rankings |
| 2023 | 132 | QS Asian University Rankings |
| 2024 | 153 | QS Asian University Rankings |

- 2024 Ranked #781-790 in QS World University Rankings
- 2024 Ranked #10 in Malaysia (Public Universities)
- 2024 Ranked #1 in MTUN

== Collaboration partners ==
- Beijing Jiaotong University, China
  - BJTU-UMPSA Dual Degree Program

== Notable alumni ==
- Syed Mohamad Hamzah al-Junid Bin Syed Abdul Rahman, former managing director of AJ Infinite (M) Sdn. Bhd.
- Yana Samsudin, actress
- Mohd Hairi Mad Shah - Member of the Johor State Executive Council, MLA for state seat Larkin
- Khairul Azhari Saut - Malaysian politician

== Presence in media ==
The main campus was set as the background setting for a television comedy series known as Namaku Bedah (2017).

== See also ==
- List of universities in Malaysia
