= Malaysian Qualifications Framework =

System for post-secondary education qualifications in Malaysia

The Malaysian Qualifications Framework (Malay: Kerangka Kelayakan Malaysia) or the MQF is a unified system of post secondary qualifications offered on a national basis in Malaysia. It is administered by the Malaysian Qualifications Agency (MQA), a statutory body under the purview of the Ministry of Higher Education (MOHE).

== Development of the MQF ==
With the rapid growth of the private education sector in Malaysia, the National Accreditation Board (Malay: Lembaga Akreditasi Negara) or LAN was established in 1996 to oversee the certification of standards and accreditation of academic programs provided by private colleges and universities in Malaysia. In April 2002, a Quality Assurance Division (QAD) was established by the Ministry of Education (MOE) to manage and co-ordinate the quality assurance system in public universities.

Prior to the establishment of these bodies, no specific accreditation system existed and institutions of higher education had only to be duly established or registered under the relevant governing legislations:

- Public institutions of higher learning

- Universities and University Colleges Act 1971

- Private institutions of higher learning

- Essential (Higher Educational Institutions) Regulations 1969 (repealed in 1996)
- Education Act 1996
- Private Higher Educational Institutions Act 1996

In June 2003, a national consultation seminar was held to establish a national qualifications framework that would integrate, rationalise, justify and bring together all qualifications offered on a national basis into a single interconnected system. The MQF was finally adopted in 2007 and both the QAD and LAN were dissolved and their functions taken over by the MQA which was established on 1 November 2007 by the Malaysian Qualifications Agency Act 2007.

== Qualification awarding sectors ==
The framework divides all qualifications into three sectors, correlating with the type of institution offer the courses:

- Skills sector

Malaysian Skills Certificate 1-3, Malaysian Skills Diplomas 4, Malaysian Skills Advanced Diploma 5

- Vocational and Technical sector

Certificate, Diploma, Advanced Diploma

- Higher Education sector

Certificate, Diploma, Advanced Diploma, Graduate Certificate & Diploma, Bachelor's Degree, Postgraduate Certificate & Diploma, Master's Degree, Doctoral Degree

MQF 2.0 The framework divides all qualifications into two sectors, correlating with the type of institution offer the courses:

- Vocational and Technical sector

Certificate 1-3, Diploma, Advanced Diploma and Bachelor's Degree

- Higher Education sector

Certificate, Diploma, Advanced Diploma, Graduate Certificate & Diploma, Bachelor's Degree, Postgraduate Certificate & Diploma, Master's Degree, Doctoral Degree

== Qualification levels ==
=== Certificates ===
==== Skills Certificate ====
The Malaysian Skills Certificate (Malay: Sijil Kemahiran Malaysia) is implemented based on the National Occupational Skills Standard (NOSS) developed by the Department of Skills Development (DSD) under the purview of the Ministry of Human Development. It is conferred as a formal recognised certificate to individuals who has shown capabilities that acquired or practised with competencies to do a task or work, which usually in the form of basic vocational skills. The criteria and standards of the SKM are articulated with higher level qualifications to enable holders to progress from the level of semi skills, to skilled production, right up to supervisory, executive and managerial functions.

These certifications can be earned through:

- DSD accredited training centres

Undergoing a fixed training program or course by community colleges and DSD Accredited Training Centers.

- Dual National Training Programme

An apprenticeship scheme conducted within an industry and at public skills training institution.

- Prior Achievement Accreditation

Recognition of prior learning whereby skills acquired either through employment or previous trainings are assessed.

There is no minimum credit requirement for Skills Certificates and they are granted according to the assessed skills and levels attained.

==== Vocational and Technical Certificates ====
Vocational and Technical Certificates prepares students for specific technical tasks and is the beginning of further training in the selected field. The program is usually based on in situ training at the training institutions and contains at least 25% vocational or technical content.

A minimum of 60 credits are recommended to successfully complete a vocational or technical certificate.

These courses are usually delivered by community colleges, polytechnics, and accredited private providers.

==== Foundation or University Preparatory Courses ====
Foundation courses or university preparatory courses such as the Sijil Tinggi Pelajaran Malaysia (STPM), Matriculation and Foundation Certificates are not in the MQF as they are entry qualifications to universities. Nonetheless, MQF determines standards for these certificates to ensure comparability and standardisation of student abilities.

=== Diploma ===
==== Higher Education, Vocational, Technical and Skills Diplomas ====
Higher education, Vocational, Technical and Skills Diplomas encompasses capabilities and responsibilities that are wide-ranging and will at the end, lead to a career. Diploma level education balances theory and practical applications, and stresses on instillation of the necessary values, ethics and attitudes in the respective disciplines.

A minimum of 90 credits are recommended to successfully complete a Diploma.

These courses are usually delivered by polytechnics, universities and accredited private providers.

=== Skills Advanced and Advanced Diploma ===
Skills Advanced and Advanced Diplomas are specific qualifications, which identifies individuals who have the knowledge, practical skills, managerial abilities and more complex and higher responsibilities than those expected at the diploma level.

A minimum of 40 credits are recommended to successfully complete an Advanced Diploma.

These courses are usually delivered by polytechnics, universities, and accredited private providers.

=== Degree levels ===
==== Bachelor degree ====
A Bachelor's degree prepares students for general employment. entry into post graduate programs and research as well as highly skilled careers. It enables individuals to pair responsibilities, which require great autonomy in professional decision making.

A minimum of 120 credits are recommended to successfully complete a bachelor's degree.

These courses are usually delivered by universities and accredited private providers.

==== Master's degree ====
A Master's degree provides for the furtherance of knowledge, skills and abilities obtained at the Bachelor's level. The entrance to a master's degree is usually based on proven capabilities to pursue postgraduate studies in the selected fields.

A minimum of 40 credits are recommended to successfully complete a master's degree. Master's degree obtained by research do not have credit values and are awarded based on assessment and merit.

These courses are usually delivered by universities and accredited private providers.

==== Doctorate ====
A Doctoral Degree provides for the furtherance of knowledge, skills and abilities obtained at the Master's level. It generally provides the graduate with the ability to conduct independent research and requires that the student contribute to the original research through an in-depth dissertation which has been presented and defended according to internationally recognised standards including being published in internationally referred publications.

These courses are usually exclusively delivered by universities.

=== Lifelong education pathways ===
MQF provides pathways for individuals to progress themselves in the context of lifelong learning.

==== Advanced Diploma ====
Advanced Diplomas are specific qualifications, which identifies individuals who have the knowledge, practical skills, managerial abilities and more complex and higher responsibilities than those expected at the diploma level.

A minimum of 40 credits are recommended to successfully complete an Advanced Diploma.

These courses are usually delivered by polytechnics, universities, and accredited private providers.

==== Graduate Certificate and Graduate Diploma ====
Graduate Certificates and Graduate Diplomas are qualifications that comprise competencies at the level of a bachelor's degree. The difference between the Graduate Certificate and the Graduate Diploma is in the credit value. The qualifications are conferred upon the completion of education or formal training, recognition of work experience, inclusive of voluntary work or in combination. Graduate Certificates and Graduate Diplomas are used for purposes such as continuing professional development, changing a field of training or expertise and as entry qualification to a higher level with permissible credit transfer. These are conferred without taking into account the previous qualifications of the holder and are dependent on the aims of the qualification.

A minimum of 30 credits are recommended to successfully complete a Graduate Certificate whereas a minimum of 60 credits are recommended for the completion of a Graduate Diploma.

These courses are usually delivered by universities and accredited private providers.

==== Postgraduate Certificate and Postgraduate Diploma ====
Postgraduate Certificates and Postgraduate Diplomas are qualifications, which contain competencies at least at the level of a master's degree and acquired after obtaining a qualification equivalent to that of a bachelor's degree. A major part of the credits is at the level of a master's degree in the related field of study, continuing skills or specialisation. The difference between the Postgraduate Certificate and the Postgraduate Diploma is in the credit value. In the professional fields, qualifications are usually conferred when the practitioner completes continuing professional education or advanced training which is more professional than academic in nature, so to be known or recognised as experts.

A minimum of 20 credits are recommended to successfully complete a Graduate Certificate whereas a minimum of 30 credits are recommended for the completion of a Graduate Diploma.

These courses are usually delivered by universities and accredited private providers.

== MQF qualifications and levels chart ==
| MQF Levels | Sectors | | | Lifelong Learning |
| MQF Levels | Skills | Vocational and Training | Higher Education | Lifelong Learning |
| 8 | | | Doctoral Degree | Accreditation for Prior Experiential Learning (APEL) |
| 7 | | | Master's Degree | Accreditation for Prior Experiential Learning (APEL) |
| 7 | | | Postgraduate Certificate & Diploma | Accreditation for Prior Experiential Learning (APEL) |
| 6 | | | Bachelor's Degree | Accreditation for Prior Experiential Learning (APEL) |
| 6 | | | Graduate Certificate & Diploma | Accreditation for Prior Experiential Learning (APEL) |
| 5 | Skills Advanced Diploma | Advanced Diploma | Advanced Diploma | Accreditation for Prior Experiential Learning (APEL) |
| 4 | Skills Diploma | Diploma | Diploma | Accreditation for Prior Experiential Learning (APEL) |
| 3 | Skills Certificate 3 | Vocational & Technical Certificate | Certificate | Accreditation for Prior Experiential Learning (APEL) |
| 2 | Skills Certificate 2 | Vocational & Technical Certificate | | Accreditation for Prior Experiential Learning (APEL) |
| 1 | Skills Certificate 1 | Vocational & Technical Certificate | | Accreditation for Prior Experiential Learning (APEL) |

== See also ==
- Education in Malaysia
- Educational accreditation
