= Berjaya University College =

Private university college in Kuala Lumpur, Malaysia

Coordinates: 3°08′31.9″N 101°42′38.2″E

- Berjaya UC
- Former name: Berjaya University College of Hospitality
- Type: Private
- Established: 2008
- Chancellor: Tunku Azizah Aminah Maimunah Iskandariah
- Location: Malaysia
- Website: berjaya.edu.my

Berjaya University College (formerly known as Berjaya University College of Hospitality) is a private university college in Malaysia, located within Berjaya Times Square, Kuala Lumpur, Malaysia. Berjaya UC offers qualifications in business, culinary arts, hospitality and tourism higher education, as well as liberal arts, from foundation to postgraduate levels.

Berjaya University College partnership with various industry partners, including the Berjaya Corporation Group's hospitality and tourism businesses. Through these partnerships, students have the opportunity to undertake internships, industrial attachments, and work placements in leading companies, which helps them to develop their skills and gain valuable industry experience.

== History ==
Berjaya UC received its licence from Malaysia's Ministry of Higher Education to operate as an institution of higher learning in November 2008.

== Faculties ==
Berjaya UC's programmes are offered via the following four faculties:

- BERJAYA Business School
- Faculty of Culinary Arts
- Faculty of Hospitality & Tourism – School of Hospitality
- Faculty of Hospitality & Tourism – School of Tourism
- Faculty of Liberal Arts – Berjaya Language Centre
- Faculty of Liberal Arts – Berjaya School of Communication & Media Arts
- Faculty of Liberal Arts – Berjaya School of Humanities and Social Science
