= MISI University =

Educational institute in Malaysia

- 马来西亚供应链创新大学 (Chinese)
- Former name: Malaysia Institute for Supply Chain Innovation
- Type: Private university
- Established: 22 March 2011
- Location: Shah Alam, Selangor, Malaysia
- Language: English
- Website: www.misi.edu.my

Chinese name
- Simplified Chinese: 马来西亚供应链创新大学
- Traditional Chinese: 馬來西亞供應鏈創新大學
Transcriptions
Standard Mandarin
- Hanyu Pinyin: Mǎláixīyà Gōngyìngliàn Chuàngxīn Dàxué

MISI University, formerly known as Malaysia Institute for Supply Chain Innovation (MISI), is a private higher education institution located in Shah Alam, Selangor, Malaysia. Established in 2011, the university operates independently as a degree-granting institution under Malaysian law.

MISI University offers academic programmes across various fields of study, with its origins in supply chain management and logistics education. It also undertakes research, professional development, executive education and industry engagement activities.

MISI University is wholly owned by Malaysia Logistics Innovation Berhad (201101008427) .

== History ==
MISI was established in March 2011 through a joint initiative between the Government of Malaysia and the Massachusetts Institute of Technology (MIT). The university was initially established with a focus on postgraduate education, research and industry engagement in supply chain management and logistics.

As part of its early academic development, MISI was affiliated with MIT and participated in the MIT Global SCALE Network, an international network of supply chain and logistics education and research centres.

MISI subsequently underwent organisational changes and ended its affiliation with MIT. Following its reorganisation, the university continued its operations independently and was renamed to MISI University, reflecting the expansion of its academic activities beyond its original focus.

While its historical foundation was primarily in supply chain management and logistics, MISI University has since expanded its academic scope to include programmes in other areas of study.

== Academic Programmes ==
MISI University offers academic programmes in a range of disciplines at postgraduate and other levels of higher education.

Supply chain management and logistics remain among the University's established areas of academic expertise. The University's academic portfolio has subsequently expanded to encompass additional fields of study in line with its development as a multidiscplinary higher education institution.

The University's academic programmes are accredited by the Malaysian Qualifications Agency (MQA).

== Research and Industry Engagement ==
MISI University conducts research and industry-related activities involving local and international organisations. Its research activities historically developed around supply chain management, logistics, procurement and related areas.

The University also engages with industry through applied research, professional development programmes, executive education, short courses and other forms of corporate and institutional collaboration.

== Campus Location ==
MISI University is located at Plaza MASALAM, Seksyen 9, Shah Alam.

== Ownership ==
MISI University is wholly owned by Malaysia Logistics Innovation Berhad (201101008427), a company incorporated in Malaysia.
