= Department of Skills Development =

- Jabatan Pembangunan Kemahiran (DSD / JSK) جابتن ڤمباڠونن كماهيرن

Department overview
- Jurisdiction: Malaysia
- Minister responsible: V. Sivakumar, Minister of Human Resources
- Deputy Minister responsible: Mustapha Sakmud, Deputy Minister of Human Resources
- Parent department: Ministry of Human Resources
- Website: www.dsd.gov.my

The Department of Skills Development (Malay: Jabatan Pembangunan Kemahiran, abbreviated DSD or JPK; Jawi: جابتن ڤمباڠونن كماهيرن) is an agency under the Ministry of Human Resources for co-ordination and control of training skills for Malaysian citizens. It researches and develops standards to evaluate job expertise and competency.

== Organisation ==
The agency is led by a Director General, assisted by a Deputy Director General and a Legal Adviser. Department of Skill Development's functions are further delegated to 14 agencies. Each agency is led by a director.

== Malaysian Skill Certificate ==
Defining the contents of Sijil Kemahiran Malaysia (Malaysian Skill Certificates) is the major function of Department of Skill Development.

There are currently five different levels of certification. Skill Certificates are obtained through Accredited Training Institutions and Industry-Oriented Training. Apprenticeship training courses in the National Dual Training System are carried out in approved institutes.

Separately, Pengiktirafan Pencapaian Terdahulu (PPT) (Recognition of Prior Achievement) allow trainees or trainers to convert their experience (either in work or training) into Sijil Kemahiran Malaysia. Malaysians can be awarded SKM without formal courses. They submit proof of such experience and the evidence is reviewed by the relevant officers and confirmed by the Pegawai Pengesahan Luaran, who is usually from the Department of Skill Development.

== Accredited Centres ==
Malaysian Skills Certificates are awarded to trainees who complete the course at the centres accredited by the agency. Accredited centres are divided into:

1) Public Approved Centres 2) Private Approved Centres 30 Industrial Approved Centres 4) Association Approved Centres 5) National Dual Training (NDT) Approved Centres

== National Occupational Skills Standard ==
National Occupational Skills Standard (NOSS) specifies level of competency required by a worker to perform a specific job at different levels. A syllabus describes each skill and level.
