= Malaysian Qualifications Agency =

Malaysian government organisation

- Abbreviation: MQA
- Type: Government Organisation
- Legal status: Statutory body
- Purpose: Educational accreditation
- Headquarters: Mercu MQA, Jalan Teknokrat 7, Cyberjaya, Malaysia
- Region served: Malaysia
- Chief Executive Officer: Dr Mohamad Shatar Sabran
- Parent organisation: Ministry of Higher Education
- Website: www.mqa.gov.my

The Malaysian Qualifications Agency (MQA; Malay: Agensi Kelayakan Malaysia) is a statutory body in Malaysia set up under the Malaysian Qualifications Act 2007 to accredit academic programs provided by educational institutions providing post secondary or higher education and facilitate the accreditation and articulation of qualifications.

The head office is in Cyberjaya, Selangor.

== Role ==
The main role of the MQA is to implement the Malaysian Qualifications Framework (MQF) as a basis for quality assurance of higher education and as the reference point for the criteria and standards for national qualifications. Specifically, the functions of the MQA are:

- To implement MQF as a reference point for Malaysian qualifications
- To develop standards and credits and all other relevant instruments as national references for the conferment of awards with the co-operation of stakeholders
- To quality assure higher education institutions and programmes
- To accredit courses that fulfil the set criteria and standards
- To facilitate the recognition and articulation of qualifications
- To maintain the Malaysian Qualifications Register (MQR)

The MQA also evaluates foreign qualifications and assesses it for equivalency with Malaysian secondary school and university preparatory qualifications.

== Exemptions ==
The Education Act 1996 specifically excludes from its definition of educational institutions, schools or any other institutions where the teaching is confined exclusively to the teaching of any religion or any place declared by the Minister by notification in the Gazette not to be an educational institution. This allows for schools that provide religious instruction exclusively (like seminaries) to be exempt from the jurisdiction of the MQA.

== History ==
Under Malaysian law, all institutions of higher education established by the federal government are deemed to be self-accrediting whereas no formal accreditation system for courses of study provided by privately owned (including those owned by state governments) existed until the passing of the series of education-related legislation in 1996.

=== The situation before 1996 ===
The first university in Malaysia, the University of Malaya (UM), was a result of the union between the older King Edward VII College of Medicine (established in 1905) and Raffles College (established in 1928) with the passage of the University of Malaya Ordinance 1949. The ordinance empowered UM to confer diplomas and degrees in its own name, making it de jure self-accrediting institution. With the 1961 separation of the Kuala Lumpur campus and Singapore campus of UM into the University of Malaya and the University of Singapore respectively, the University of Malaya Act 1961 and the Degrees and Diplomas Acts 1962 re-affirmed the authority granted to under previous legislations to the newly re-organised UM.

With the passage of the Universities and University Colleges Act 1971 (UUCA), all universities and university colleges established by the federal government of Malaysia were granted the power to confer diplomas and degrees in their own name. Universiti Teknologi Mara was established by the Universiti Teknologi Mara Act 1976 granting it the same powers as other institutions established under the UUCA but allowing it to restrict its enrolment of non-Malay and non-Bumiputra students by virtue of Article 153 of the Constitution of Malaysia.

The Registration of Schools Ordinance 1950 provided for the registration of privately owned educational institutions providing post secondary or higher education. Subsequent legislation such as the Education Ordinance 1957, the Education Act 1961, the Essential (Higher Educational Institutions) Regulations 1969, the Education (Amendment) Act 1963, and the Education Act 1996, continued to provide the legal basis for the registration of private institutions of higher education but continued to grant the power to approve courses of study by the Minister.

Nonetheless, the passage of the National Council of Higher Education Act 1996 gave indications that an overhaul of the regulations governing private institutions of higher education was being planned. The subsequent passages of the Private Higher Educational Institutes Act 1996 and the Lembaga Akreditasi Negara Act 1996 later the same year saw the revamping of the registration and approval regime of private institutions of higher education.

=== Reform and consolidation ===
A statutory body known as Lembaga Akreditasi Negara (English: National Accreditation Board) or LAN was established under the Lembaga Akreditasi Negara Act 1996 to accredit certificate, diploma and degree programs provided by private institutions of higher education. In April 2002, a Quality Assurance Division (QAD) was established by the Ministry of Education (MOE) to manage and co-ordinate the quality assurance system in public institutions of higher learning.

A national consultation seminar was convened in 2003 to streamline and provide for a unified system of qualifications offered by all institutions of higher education in Malaysia; this eventually saw the adoption of the Malaysian Qualifications Framework (MQF) in 2007.

=== Establishment of the MQF ===
On 1 November 2007, the QAD and LAN were dissolved and their functions taken over by the MQA which was established under the Malaysian Qualifications Agency Act 2007.

== See also ==
- Education in Malaysia
- Malaysian Qualifications Framework
- Educational accreditation
