= Ministry of Higher Education (Malaysia) =

Ministry in Malaysia

- Kementerian Pendidikan Tinggi (MOHE) کمنترين ڤنديديقن تيڠݢي

Ministry overview
- Formed: 27 March 2004; 22 years ago
- Preceding Ministry: Ministry of Education
- Jurisdiction: Government of Malaysia
- Headquarters: No. 2, Menara 2, Jalan P5/6, Precinct 5, Federal Government Administrative Centre, 62200 Putrajaya
- Motto: Soaring Upwards (Peningkatan Berterusan)
- Employees: 15,978 (2022)
- Annual budget: MYR 20,195,970,000 (2022)
- Minister responsible: Dato' Seri Diraja Dr Zambry bin Abd Kadir, Minister of Higher Education
- Deputy Minister responsible: Datuk Ts Mustapha bin Sakmud, Deputy Minister of Higher Education
- Ministry executives: Datuk Dr Aneese bin Ibrahim, Secretary-General; Datuk Prof Azlinda binti Azman, Director-General; Dato Dr Haji Megat Sany bin Megat Ahmad Supian, Deputy Secretary-General (Policy); Datuk Mohamad Azhan bin Md Amir, Deputy Secretary-General (Management and Development); Ahmad Rizal bin Adnan, Deputy Director General of Higher Education (Governance and Development); Prof Dr Zainal Amin bin Ayub, Deputy Director General of Higher Education (Academic and Research)
- Website: www.mohe.gov.my

The Ministry of Higher Education (MOHE; Malay: Kementerian Pendidikan Tinggi; Jawi: کمنترين ڤنديديقن تيڠݢي ) is a ministry of the Government of Malaysia that is responsible for higher education, polytechnic, community college, student loan, accreditation, student volunteer. Its main office is in Putrajaya. The ministry was formed on 27 March 2004, merged back into the Ministry of Education on 14 May 2013, but then reformed on 28 July 2015. After the 2018 general election, the ministry became a higher education division under the MOE. In the Muhyiddin cabinet, the higher education division was separated again from the Ministry of Education to form as a new ministry since 10 March 2020.

== Organisation ==
- Minister of Higher Education
  - Deputy Minister of Higher Education
    - Secretary-General
      - Under the Authority of Secretary-General
        - Legal Unit
        - Internal Audit Unit
        - Corporate Communication Unit
        - Integrity Unit
        - Higher Education Performance and Delivery Management Unit
      - Deputy Secretary-General (Policy)
        - Policy and Research Division
        - Strategic Planning Policy Division
        - Internal Relations Division
        - Scholarships Division
      - Deputy Secretary-General (Management)
        - Human Resource Management Division
        - Development Division
        - Finances Division
        - Accounts Division
        - Information Management Division
        - Management Service Division

=== Federal departments ===
1. Department of Higher Education (DHE), or Jabatan Pendidikan Tinggi (JPT). (Official site)
2. Department of Polytechnic Education (DPE), or Jabatan Pengajian Politeknik (JPP). (Official site)
3. Department of Community Colleges Education (DCCE), or Jabatan Pengajian Kolej Komuniti (JPKK). (Official site)

=== Federal agencies ===
1. National Higher Education Fund Corporation, or Perbadanan Tabung Pendidikan Tinggi Nasional (PTPTN). (Official site)
2. Malaysian Qualifications Agency (MQA), or Agensi Kelayakan Malaysia. (Official site)
3. Student Volunteer Foundation, or Yayasan Sukarelawan Siswa (YSS). (Official site)

== Key legislation ==
The Ministry of Higher Education is responsible for administration of several key Acts:

== Background ==
The functions of the MOHE was originally within the purview of the Ministry of Education (MOE) until the departments and agencies responsible for higher education were separated from the MOE on 27 March 2004 and established as a full ministry under a Federal Minister. In 2013, Prime Minister Najib Razak merged the Ministry of Education and the Ministry of Higher Education into a single Ministry of Education. In 2015, the Ministry was reestablished.

== Organisation ==
The MOHE is headed by the Minister of Higher Education, a post held by Noraini Ahmad (UMNO). She is assisted by Deputy Minister Mansor Othman.

The following departments and agencies are under the purview of the MOHE:

=== Department of Higher Education ===
Also known by its Malay acronym, JPT (for Jabatan Pendidikan Tinggi), the department was headed by a Director General, Datin Paduka Ir. Dr. Siti Hamisah Binti Tapsir. This department was responsible for the management of both public and private institutes of higher learning and also Malaysian Student Department around the world.

=== Department of Polytechnic Education ===
Also known by its Malay acronym, JPP (for Jabatan Pengajian Politeknik), the department was headed by a Director General, YBhg. Datuk Hj Mohlis Bin Jaafar. This department was responsible for the management of polytechnics.

=== Department of Community Colleges ===
Also known by its Malay abbreviation, JPKK (for Jabatan Pengajian Kolej Komuniti), the department was headed by a Director General, Asc. Prof. Kamarudin Kasim. This department was responsible for the management of community colleges.

=== Malaysian Qualifications Agency ===
The Malaysian Qualifications Agency or MQA is a statutory body in Malaysia set up to accredit academic programs provided by educational institutions providing post secondary or higher education and facilitate the recognition and articulation of qualifications.

=== Perbadanan Tabung Pendidikan Tinggi Nasional ===
Better known as PTPTN (English: National Higher Education Fund Corporation), this agency provides education loans as a form of financial assistance to students with financial needs to aid them in pursuing a higher education. PTPTN also manages a students savings scheme for higher education purposes.

=== Tunku Abdul Rahman Foundation ===
The foundation (Malay: Yayasan Tunku Abdul Rahman) is named after the first Prime Minister of Malaysia and founder of the foundation, Tunku Abdul Rahman. It provides scholarships for students to pursue a higher education. Students who are awarded the scholarships are known as Tunku Scholars.

=== Yayasan Sukarelawan Siswa/ Student Volunteers Foundation ===
The foundation (Malay: Yayasan Sukarelawan Siswa (YSS) / Student Volunteers Foundation) was launched in 2012 as wholly owned entity of the Ministry of Education (MoE). Holding the vision to develop Malaysia as students' volunteer hub and produce global student volunteer icons, YSS is determined to carry out its mission to encourage, educate and guide the students of higher learning institutions to promote world peace and inculcate the spirit of camaraderie through community engagement within and outside the country.

== Public universities ==
The MOHE also has oversight responsibility for all the public universities in Malaysia.

== See also ==
- Minister of Higher Education (Malaysia)
- Deputy Minister of Higher Education (Malaysia)
- Education in Malaysia
- Malaysian University F.T.
- UKM F.C.
