= Vehicle registration plates of the Channel Islands =

Vehicle registration plates of the Channel Islands include:

- Vehicle registration plates of Jersey
- Vehicle registration plates of the Bailiwick of Guernsey
