= Sprite (motorcycle) =

Historical British make of motorcycle

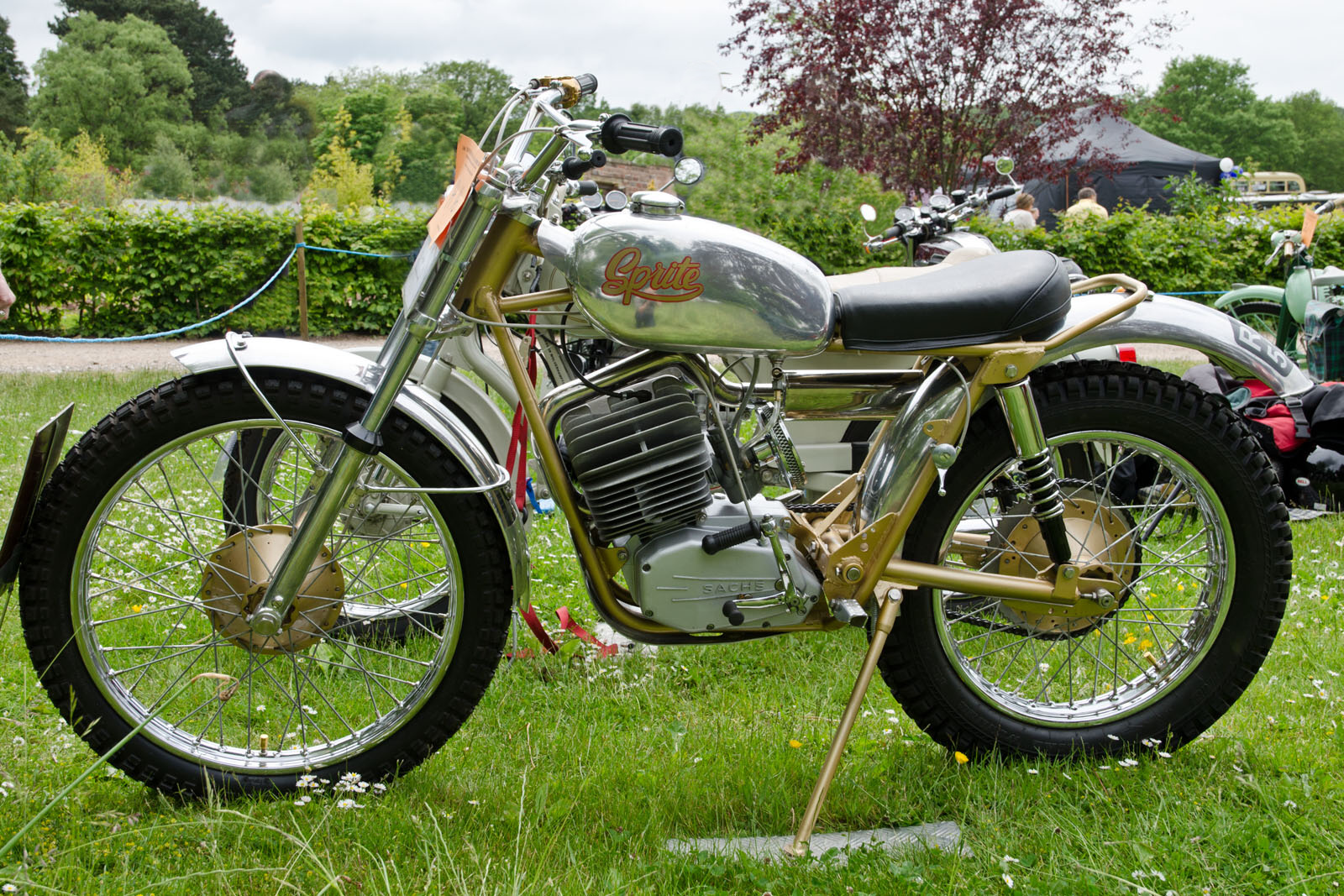
1970 Sprite Trials with Sachs engine and road number-plate on rear mudguard

Sprite was an historical British brand of off-road motorcycle, built by Frank Hipkin, of Hipkin & Evans, trading as Sprite Motor Cycles, initially at Cross Street, Smethwick, Birmingham and later by Sprite Developments Ltd., Halesowen, Worcester (1965–1971). The Sprite slogan was "Built by riders—for riders". Frank Hipkin died in August, 2012.

== Products ==
Sprite manufactured trials and scrambles frames which were usually available as a kit-form motorcycle to avoid UK Purchase Tax. The first machine was developed as a scrambler with Alpha 246 cc two-stroke engine and a modified Cotton frame, followed by their own Sprite-framed version and a slightly larger frame-only (without engine) option to use a 490 cc Triumph unit construction engine/gearbox for the larger class of scrambling. The trials machine was developed for production in late 1964 using a Villiers 36A/37A 246 cc engine with iron barrel or at a higher cost, a Greeves light-alloy cylinder, and a Miller magneto.

The frames were easily distinguishable from one another; the trials frames had twin, narrow, almost parallel down-tubes, whilst the scrambles frames used splayed tubes which also carried the oil where necessary, avoiding the need for a separate oil tank. A fibreglass fuel tank, mudguards and seat/tailpiece/race number plate were all available as required. The trials version had an extended tailpiece with mounting for a road number-plate necessary in Combined trials which had timed road-stages linking with the several-to-many Observed Sections which historically could be scheduled as a typical part of a traditional UK trials event.

Under UK Construction and Use Regulations, competition machines intended for road-use were required to comply with statutory basics of sound engineering, a test certificate, mudguards, seat, audible warning device and number plate. Lighting was not required, but if fitted had to be complete and working.

The frames were initially available with AMC and Norton telescopic front forks and British Hub Co. (Motoloy) brakes front and rear. The pivoting rear-forks on all models were fitted with Silentbloc bushes. A later option was Metal Profiles (REH) front forks.

They were later built for 123, 244, and 405 cc two-stroke engines.

The Sprite marque should not be confused with the older British Spryt, a small-capacity two-stroke engine produced by Excelsior in Coventry and fitted to the historic Corgi minibike.
