= Vehicle registration plates of Malaysia =

Malaysia
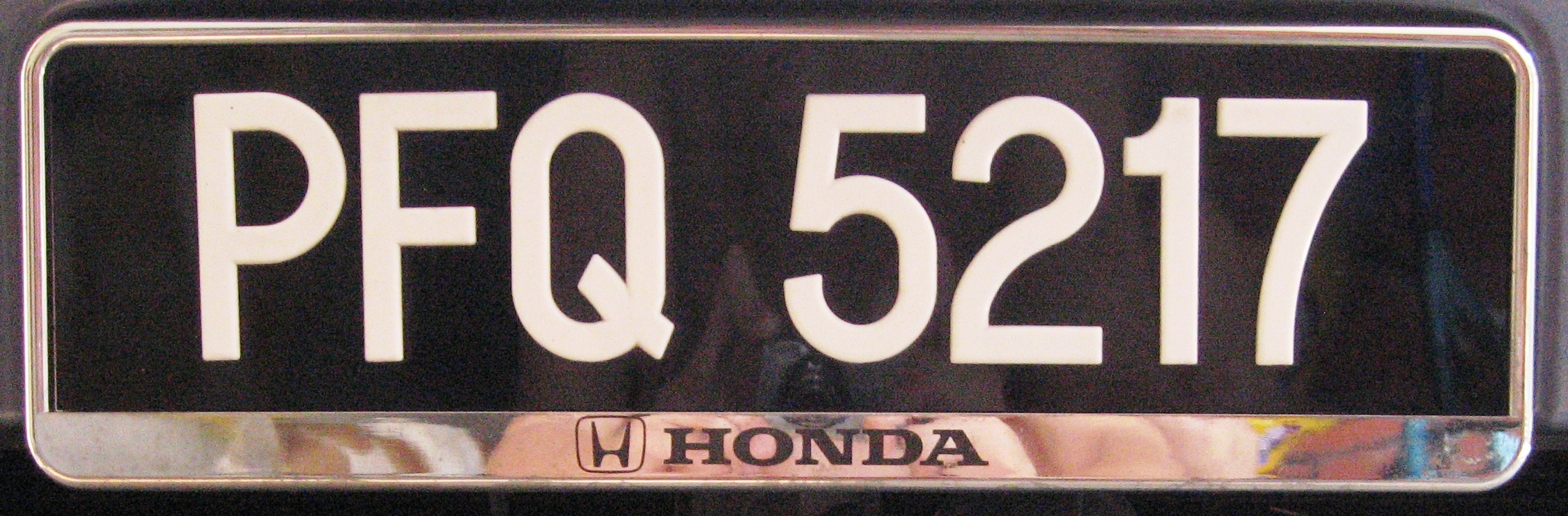
- Regular legal standard white-on-black plate issued for most vehicles.

- JPJePlate for privately registered electric car.
- Country: Malaysia
- Country code: MAL

Current series
- Serial format: Refer section Formats
- Colour (front): White on black Black on white White on red Red on white
- Colour (rear): White on black Black on white White on red Red on white

Vehicle registration plates of Malaysia are displayed at the front and rear of all private and commercial motorised vehicles in Malaysia, as required by law. The issuing of the number plates is regulated and administered by the Road Transport Department (JPJ).

Latest number plate being issued can be checked through JPJ website.

== Formats ==
The following are examples of the formats currently used;

Type of number plate	Layout
Private and commercial vehicles	N 4567, RA 4567, ABC 4567 (Standard series); WD 4567 C, JA 4567 J, QAA 4567 C, SAB 4567 C, KV 4567 B (Extended series)
Taxi	HAB 4567 or as used by private & commercial vehicles
Military	ZA 4567
Temporary	B 2341 A (A/TP 2341 for Perak, W/TP 2341 for Kuala Lumpur)
Foreign missions	12-34-DC, 12-34-CC, 12-34-WA
Royals and government	(Full title)

== Design ==
The current standard for Malaysian number plates were originally derivatives of pre-1932 number plate formats in the United Kingdom, first issued after the introduction of motorised vehicles in the 1900s during British rule. Number plates are typically issued and are formatted similarly for any motorised vehicle that runs on rubber tyres, including most road-legal private, commercial and industrial vehicles, motorcycles, emergency vehicles, and selected heavy equipment (such as agricultural tractors, truck-mounted cranes and backhoe loaders). With the exception of those issued for taxis, vehicle dealers and diplomats, all vehicle number plates in Malaysia have white characters on black background for both front and rear plates, regardless of the vehicle type.

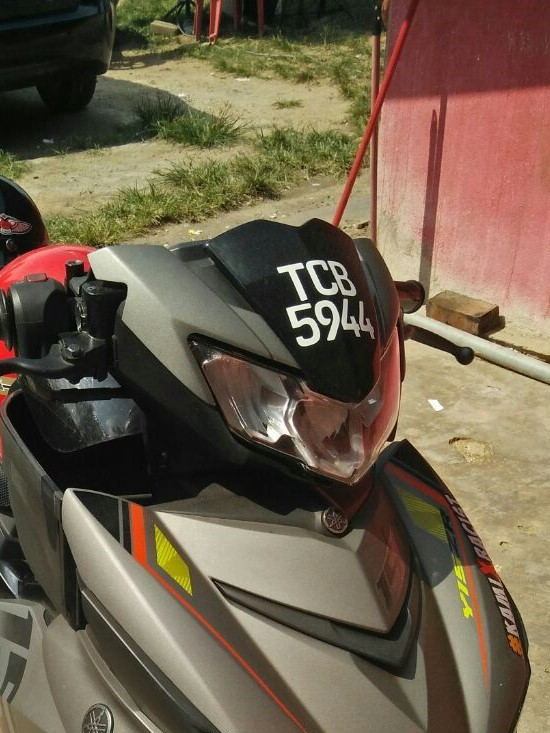
A Terengganu-registered number on the front of a motorcycle, represented by FE-Schrift-styled character stickers arranged onto the handlebar fairing which is illegal by JPJ standard but very commonly used.

Standards for number plate designs have been defined by JPJ but are only practiced to an extent. Character size, layouts, and colour use are more strictly enforced for accurate identification and optimum visibility. However, the dimensions of the plates displaying the license number are more loosely enforced. While many vehicles display plates in regulation dimensions or are housed in dealer plate frames with standardised dimensions, some license plates are outlined to precisely fit into vastly larger recessed spaces holding the rear license plates, or appear with reduced or custom dimensions where no proper alcoves exist, as commonly practiced on the front fenders and fairings of most motorcycles and the front of sports cars.

A compact version of Arial Bold is currently the typeface preferred by JPJ, however the department's plate number specifications page features a diagram that also lists "Calisto MT Italic" and "Franklin Gothic Bold". The most commonly used type is a factory manufactured type, but other easy-to-read typefaces are generally acceptable too. Common alternative choices include Charles Wright, which has been used on Singaporean, Hong Kong, and British plates, and FE-Schrift, which is used on German plates and is thus popular among Malaysian owners of cars with European marques, especially German brands and models. More obscure custom typefaces have also been known to be used primarily on grey import vehicles and aftermarket licence plates.

Early Malaysian number plates were made of pressed metal, but were largely superseded by plastic plates since the 1970s, with characters either printed on or moulded in plastic pieces. The reasons for the popularity of plastics plates in Malaysia were related to cost and metal theft. That said, the disadvantages of using plastic plates include; its fragility; the ease of reproduction which advantages criminals like car cloning syndicates; the yellowing of the letters due to age and exposure to extreme environmental conditions; the letters dropping off due to the reduction in adhesiveness of the glue used to stick the white plastic letters onto the black plastic plate; and the reduction of letter spacing (kerning) in between the individual letters to evade speed cameras and easy identification. This results in an inability of enforcement agencies to identify the correct registration. To combat this, standardised number plates were discussed by JPJ in 2016, these were to include RFID chips and pressed metal plates. To this end, proposals for standardised typefaces, like JPJ 1, have also been made.

The JPJePlate number plate was introduced in September 2024. It follows a European-style number plate size with black FE-Schrift font letters on a white reflective background and a green stripe to determine as EV. It also shows the international oval code "MAL" and the Malaysian Flag. This type of number plate is compulsory for newly registered EVs from September 2024 onwards. Currently available for Electric powered cars only.

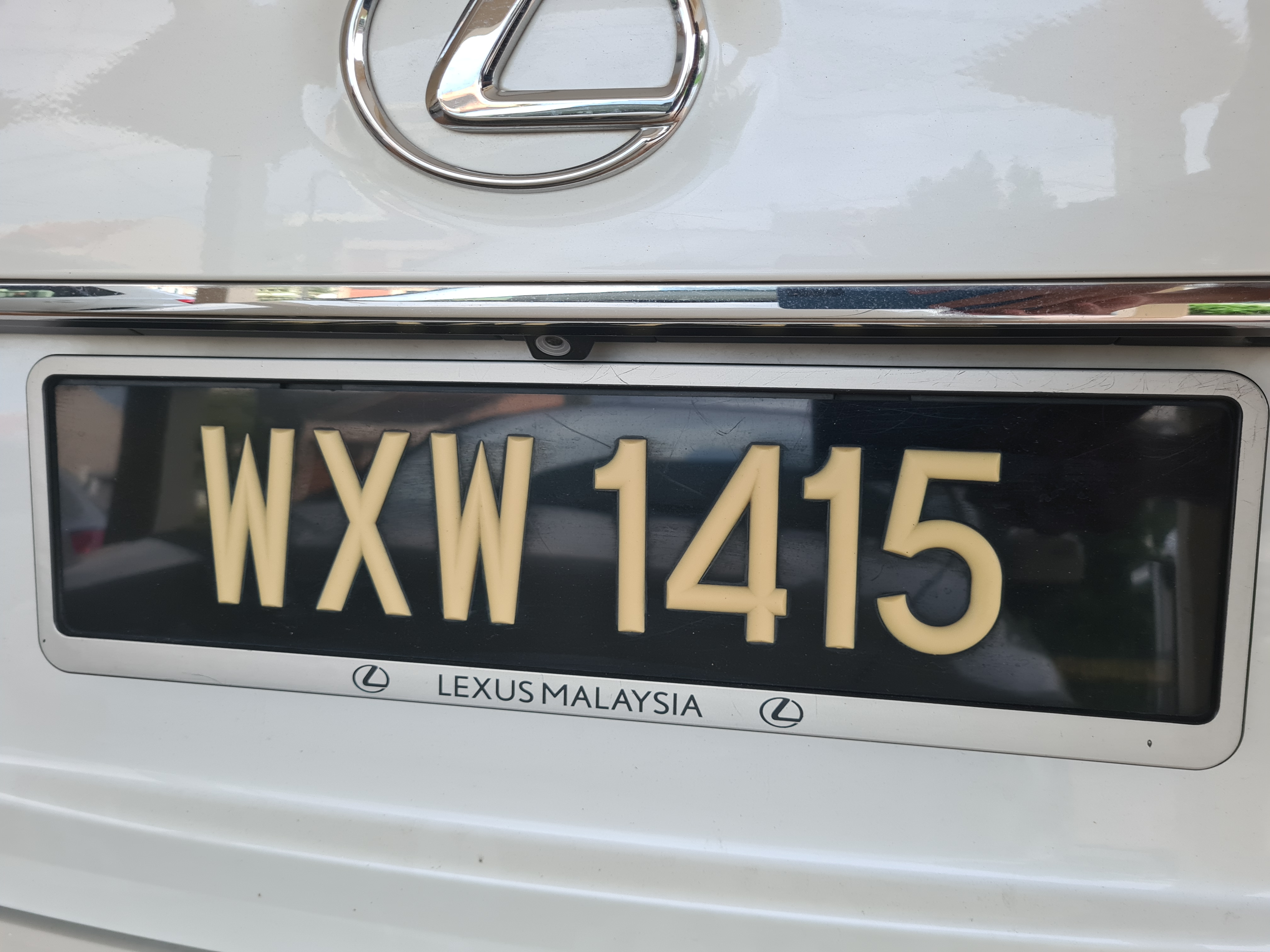
Yellowing plate due to environmental exposure

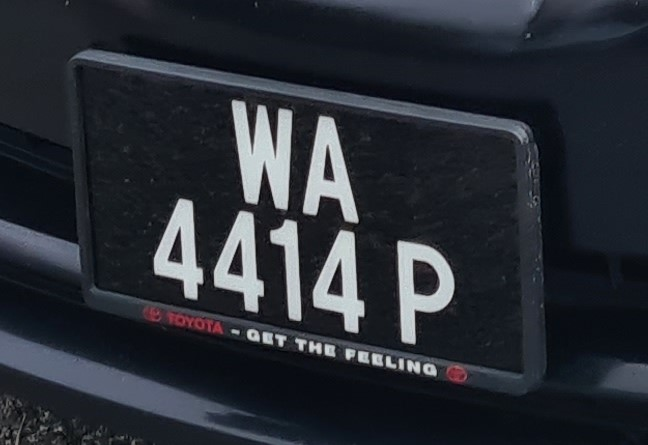
Plate with two rows

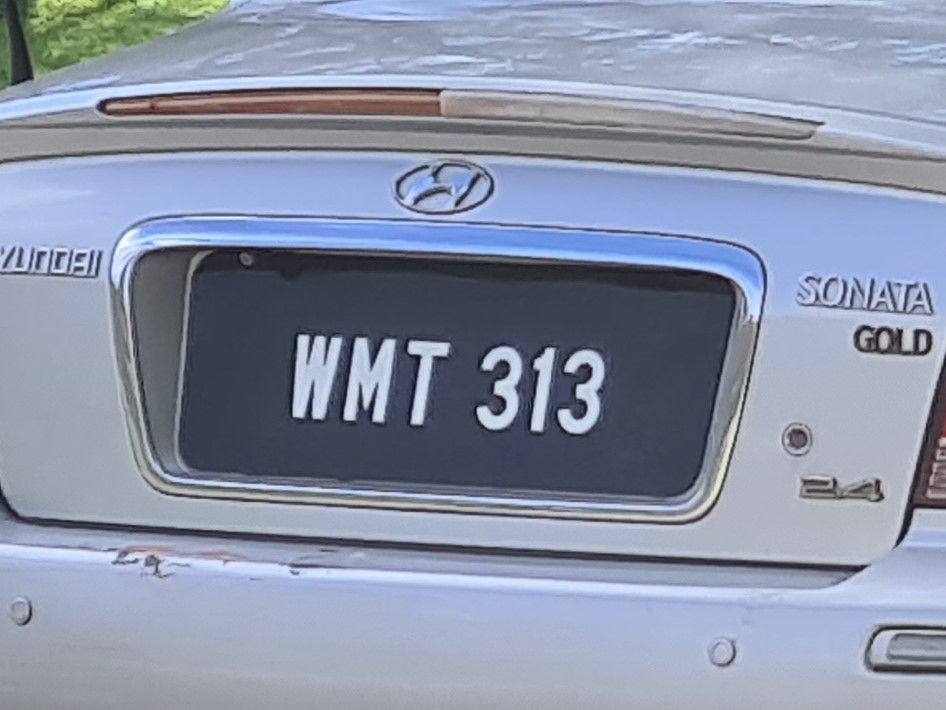
Plate with its outline following the recessed space

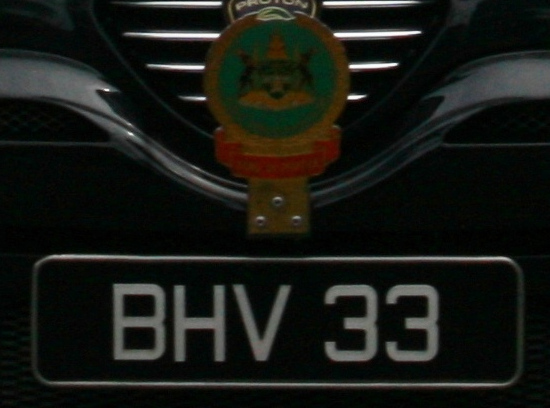
Plate with a squarish font

== Peninsular Malaysia ==
=== Current format ===
VRX 2468

All Peninsular Malaysian number plates for private and commercial type motor vehicles, except for Langkawi registered vehicles, taxis, vehicle dealers and diplomats, follow a xxx #### algorithm.

- x - The state or territory prefix. (e.g. : W = Kuala Lumpur, A = Perak, B = Selangor, P = Penang)
- x - The alphabetical sequences. (e.g. : A, B, C ... X, Y. Not including I, O and Z.)
- # - The number sequence. (e.g. : 1, 2, 3 ... 9998, 9999)

The exceptions in the algorithm are as follows:

- There can be no leading zeroes in the number sequence.
- The letters I and O are omitted from the alphabetical sequences due to their similarities with the numbers 1 and 0.
- The letter Z is omitted and reserved for use on Malaysian military vehicles.

The algorithm began with a state prefix and a sequence of numbers ranging from 1 to 9999. For example, P 1 would be the first registration plate of Penang. Once P 9999 was achieved, an alphabetical sequence was added to the right of the state prefix; PA 1 was the result. When PA 9999 was reached, the number sequence was reset and the alphabetical sequence progressed; PB 1 being the outcome. After PY 9999 was achieved, a second alphabetical sequence was added to the right of the first alphabetical sequence; PAA 1 being the outcome. When PAY 9999 was reached, the second alphabetical sequence was reset and the first alphabetical sequence progressed; resuming at PBA 1.

Registration plates of Peninsular Malaysia
Prefix (x)	State	Current Plate	Current Bidding Plate
A	Perak	APN	APP
B	Selangor	BSV	BSY
C	Pahang	CFJ	CFK
D	Kelantan	DFT	DFT
F	Putrajaya	FH	FH
J	Johor	JH_J	JL_J
K	Kedah	KGJ	KGK
KV	Langkawi	KV_F	KV_F
M	Malacca	MEJ	MEK
N	Negeri Sembilan	NEM	NEN
P	Penang	PSH	PSJ
R	Perlis	RBF	RBG
T	Terengganu	TDJ	TDJ
V	Kuala Lumpur	VSA	VSG
W	Kuala Lumpur (Exhausted in 2016)	WD_F	WD_F

==== Variants ====
===== Extended Kuala Lumpur series =====
WB 9619 Y

W 5221 C

As the most registered number plate series in the country, the W series' traditional 7-character format became the first in Peninsular Malaysia to be exhausted when WYY 9999 was registered on 26 September 2013. To allow further W plates, the algorithm was altered to feature an alphabetical suffix behind the number sequence, resetting at W 1 A. When W 9999 Y was achieved, the second alphabetical sequence emerged between the state prefix and number sequence, leading to WA 1 A. When WA 9999 Y is met, the first alphabetical sequence will reset and the second alphabetical sequence will advance, giving WB 1 A. When WY 9999 Y is reached, a third new alphabetical sequence will be spliced into the algorithm, between the second alphabetical sequence and number sequence, resulting in WAA 1 A. The series will end when WYY 9999 Y is reached. The new format would theoretically allow a vastly larger number of registered plates, better addressing the risk of exhaustion of numbers.

VFQ 3052

On 18 May 2016, less than three years into the implementation of the extended W series, the Transport Ministry, on the request of the Road Transport Department, announced the tentative retirement of the W series in place of a new V series that would revert to the regular xxx #### format. The decision was made in response to massive declines in bidding for extended W series plates as the public was gauged to favour a xxx #### format over Kuala Lumpur's xxx #### x format. The V series has launched on 1 October 2016 after completion of WD 9999 F and the extended W series was decommissioned.

===== Langkawi series =====
KV 2926 E

Vehicles in Langkawi, a Kedahan resort archipelago, are issued KV series plates after the islands achieved duty-free status. The algorithm for Langkawi is KV #### x, where KV is the territory prefix with # and x denoting the number and alphabetical sequences respectively. Prior to the KV series, Langkawi-registered vehicles were issued with K series plates as is with the rest of Kedah.

===== Putrajaya series =====
FA 1287

Following the founding of Putrajaya in 1995, vehicle license numbers registered in the territory, in a fashion similar to commemorative vanity plates, originally had their territorial prefix incorporating the name of the territory stylised in oblique Calisto followed by a number sequence of up to four digits (Putrajaya xxxx). The Putrajaya format did not incorporate additional identifiers beyond the four-digit number, limiting the number of available plates for the original Putrajaya series to 9,999 vehicles.

In response to the restrictive format the Road Transport Department began to issue F prefix plates (denoting "Federal") for new Putrajaya-registered plates effective 1 June 2016. Both FA and FB were already started issued on 22 July 2017 and 16 May 2018 respectively; and exhausted on 28 August 2017 and 25 June 2018 respectively. FC was started issued since 2 May 2019. Next are FD, FE, FF, FFF and FG which were issued on 12 April 2021, April 2022, 14 May 2023, May 2024 and January 2025. respectively. FH was first issued on 3 March 2026.

Unlike other state and federal territory plate prefixes, new Putrajaya F prefix sequences are annually issued instead of upon exhaustion.

===== Extended Johor series =====
J 4720 J

JA 4720 J

The J series traditional 7-character format, upon reaching JYY 9999, became the second in Peninsular Malaysia to be exhausted in June 2026, and was replaced with the 8-character format starting with J 1 J to J 9999 J, with subsequent serials starting with JA 1 J to JA 9999 J, and then JB 1 J to JB 9999 J, and so on.

=== History of Peninsular Malaysian registration numbers ===
==== Pre-1948 ====
The registration plate system in Malaysia traces back to the introduction of motor vehicles in the early-1900s in colonial British Malaya, with the introduction by respectable state governments of a basic x #### format, where x prefix is the state identifier. Because the x #### format were not expected to be exhausted for a considerable time, state identifiers were allowed to be represented by one or two letters.

===== Straits Settlements =====
Registration plates of Straits Settlements before 1948
Prefix	State	Prefix	State
M	Malacca	P	Penang
S	Singapore	W	Province Wellesley
L	Labuan		
B, K	Brunei		

Number plates for the Straits Settlements began to be issued in the early-1900s. With the exception of several format changes in intermediate periods, most of the Straits Settlements state identifiers continue to be used by the territories they were originally assigned to.

The Straits Settlement of Malacca was assigned with the M state identifier, which has continuously been issued on vehicles registered in the state since its introduction over a century ago. The Straits Settlement of Penang originally had two plate series, P and W, which were assigned respectively to Penang island and the mainland territory of Province Wellesley. The Province Wellesley W series was discontinued in 1957 as P plates would be issued for both territories henceforth.

The S series was assigned to the Straits Settlement of Singapore, which continuously used the basic S #### format for several decades until the format was nearly exhausted and subsequently expanded to Sx #### after rationalisation in 1948. Following Singapore's separation from Malaysia in 1965, the S series is no longer administered by the Malaysian Road Transport Department, and fell under the responsibility of the State of Singapore Registry of Vehicles and its successor, the Land Transport Authority; vehicles with Singaporean S plates that were under Malaysian ownership were reissued with corresponding Malaysian number plates. In the years following expulsion, the Singaporean number plate system evolved independently with changing prefix systems to E series since 1972, culminating to the reintroduction of the S series for private cars in 1984, the inclusion of a fourth checksum letter, and varied colour schemes for different classes of vehicles.

The L series began to be issued to Labuan in 1906, a then-independent island outpost off the coast of British North Borneo under the British North Borneo Company that would later become part of the Straits Settlement in the following year. The L plate was discontinued in 1963 after the island (now part of North Borneo/Sabah) was reformatted in accordance to North Bornean/Sabahan conventions, and would remain unused until after Labuan's status as a Federal Territory in 1984, when the L series was reinstated for the island.

===== Federated and Unfederated Malay States =====
Registration plates of the FMS and UMS before 1948
Prefix	State	Prefix	State
Federated Malay States
PK	Perak	SL	Selangor
NS	Negeri Sembilan	P	Pahang
Unfederated Malay States
JB	Johore	KN	Kelantan
K	Kedah	R	Perlis
T	Terengganu		

Due to the initial simplicity of the x #### format, plates in the Federated Malay States (FMS) (Perak, Selangor, Negeri Sembilan and Pahang) and Unfederated Malay States (UMS) (Johore, Terengganu, Kelantan, Kedah and Perlis) originally follow distinct series of state identifiers which may use one or two letters (i.e. SL and KN for early plates in Selangor and Kelantan, respectively).

In conjunction with the formation of the Federation of Malaya, rationalisation of Malayan state identifiers was conducted in 1948 to simplify all FMS and two-letter UMS prefixes into single letters. In addition, the Pahang plate, which originally assumed the P prefix and was allowed to conflict with the Penang plates for decades, was finally reassigned with a unique letter, C. Like the pre-1932 number plate designs in the United Kingdom, the order of the new prefixes also denoted the order of population size of the FMS states at the time, with Perak's A series representative of its then larger population ahead of Selangor (B) and Pahang (C). To prevent future conflicts with plates with the xx #### format, pre-1948 plates with two-letter state identifiers were subsequently required to be replaced with plates using replacement one-letter identifiers (i.e. PK 1234 to A 1234 and JB 1234 to J 1234), leading to the extinction of the use of double-letter state identifiers in Malaya; a similar change was imposed on pre-1948 Pahang plates. Remaining single-lettered UMS and Straits Settlement identifiers were not subjected to the 1948 change.

==== Post-1948 ====
Following the rationalisation of prefixes in 1948, new plates registered in Malaya (and then Peninsular Malaysia) bear a xx #### format, which was sufficient for use through the 1950s and 1960s. By the 1970s and 1980s, the xxx #### format began to reach its limit in states with higher numbers of new vehicle registrations, leading to an inclusion of a third identifying letter, creating a new xxx #### format. Selangor becomes the first state in Peninsular Malaysia to adopt the new format in 1971, followed by Perak in 1977, Johore in 1978, Penang in 1979, Kuala Lumpur in 1981, Pahang in 1986, Negeri Sembilan in 1987, Kedah in 1991, Malacca in 1993, Kelantan in 1995, Terengganu in 2000 and finally Perlis in 2018.

The V series plate of Kuala Lumpur, which replaces its predecessor W plates in October 2016, have been reached the xxx #### format on 12 April 2017, which its become the latest registration plates to reach xxx #### format after 17 years.

Until 2018, Perlis serial plates becomes only the Peninsular state that have yet exhausted its original xx #### plate series but finally it have been exhausted on 18 August 2018 and xxx #### plate series began issued.

In 1974, W series plates began to be reissued for cars registered in the newly ceded Federal Territory of Kuala Lumpur. To prevent conflicts with pre-1957 Province Wellesley plates, the Kuala Lumpur series started at WA 1 as the Province Wellesley series never exhausted the W 1-to-W 9999 range. As Kuala Lumpur was previously the capital of Selangor, vehicles registered there before 1974 are permitted to continue carrying the B series plates.

Being in the economic heart of post-war Malaya and early Malaysia, Selangor's B series was historically the most commonly registered series in the country for decades before it was surpassed by Kuala Lumpur's W series in 1996 (caused by the majority of motor vehicle dealers registering new vehicles at Wangsa Maju RTD/JPJ) and the Johor's J series in 2001 (caused by massive numbers of Malaysians finding employment in Singapore and commuting between Malaysia and Singapore by motorcycles mostly registered in Johor and most Singaporeans who resides in Johor buying vehicle in this state to avoid an expensive COE for vehicles.)

The vast majority of vehicles sold in Malaysia are now registered in the Peninsular. At the end of 2012, a total of 22,702,221 vehicles, including motorcycles, have been registered with the Malaysian Road Transport Department. Of that figure, 5,320,562 vehicles have been registered in Kuala Lumpur alone, with 3,332,767 units being privately registered, four-wheeled vehicles such as MPVs, SUVs, pick-ups and passenger cars. Additionally, a further 1,312,016, 1,226,223 and 1,052,353 four-wheeled vehicles have been privately registered in Johor, Penang and Selangor respectively. Collectively, the four states account for 8,911,154 privately registered, four-wheeled vehicles in Malaysia by the end of 2012. In comparison, 1,465,078 and 1,026,867 vehicles, including non-privately registered and non-four-wheeled vehicles, have been registered in Sarawak and Sabah respectively. Recent data released by Malaysian Automotive Association (MAA) on 30 June 2017, vehicles registered in Malaysia hit 28.2 million vehicles which Federal Territories (Majority of the registered vehicle were issued by Kuala Lumpur) registered most of the cars reaching 4 million cars. The data shows rest of states except Sabah, Sarawak and Federal Territories, motorcycles outnumbered cars on vehicle registration being issued.

Starting 1 May 2014, the border-less registration are now implemented nationwide. This system allows vehicle owners to register the vehicle from desired states and allows slow registered number plates to be registered anywhere regardless according to geographical location. Example of the success of implementation are

- As of November 2026, Kelantan D (Currently DFT) number plates are issued more in West Coast more than ever, beating Melaka in February 2015 (Currently MEJ to MEK), Negeri Sembilan in February 2019 (Currently NEM to NEN) and Pahang in January 2024 (Currently CFJ to CFK) .
- Kapit Division of Sarawak was maintained in QP series from 1991 until late 2014, QPA issued quickly after QP 9999 reached in 2014, it took 23 years for Kapit division to complete QP series; then QPB was issued on 8 May 2018 to 20 December 2021, followed with QPC on 2 March 2022, QPD on 11 October 2024 while QPE on 4 September 2026 and QPF start biding on August 2026.
- Perlis R number plate (RT started issued on 23 October 2017 after 2 consecutive months of both RR and RS running. then RU issued 19 January 2018, RV on 28 March 2018, RW on 8 May 2018, RX and RY in 6 July to 18 August 2018; currently RBF to RBG). Many R number plates were registered in Kuala Lumpur.
- Kota Kinabalu of Sabah SY number plate (SYH started issued on 15 July 2020 after SYG running from 30 June to 8 July 2020). Replaced by SJ series after SYY 9999 was reached on 7 July 2023.

Border-less registration creating vehicles no longer registered according to states and divisions and they were often registered based onto similarity to more developed neighboring country format. Example are Sabah and Sarawak number plates are very popular in Johor due to similarity to Singaporean number plates also Selangor and Kedah number plates are very popular in Miri due to similarity to Bruneian number plates.

== Sarawak ==
=== Current format ===
QAB 2397 L

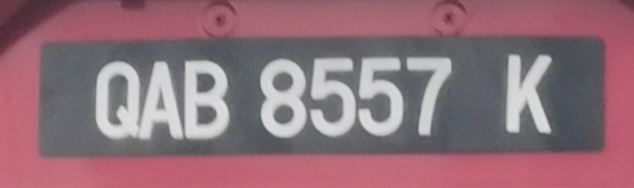
A standard Sarawakian number plate, registered in Kuching division.

All registration plates of Sarawak for private and commercial motorised vehicles with the exceptions of those used by taxis, vehicle dealers and diplomats follow a Qdx #### x algorithm.

- Q - The constant prefix for all Sarawakian number plates.
- d - The division (area) prefix. (e.g. : A = Kuching, M = Miri)
- x - The alphabetical sequences. (e.g. : A, B, C ... X and Y)
- # - The number sequence. (e.g. : 1, 2, 3 ... 9998, 9999)

The letters I, O and Z are not used and there are no leading zeroes, as in the case of the Peninsular Malaysian number plates. The current algorithm for the majority of Sarawak's divisions start with the constant Q prefix, followed by the division prefix and the number sequence. An example would be QK 1 of Kuching Division, which was issued in 1991. Once QKY 9999 was reached in 2004, an alphabetical sequence was added to the right of the division prefix; QAA 1 was the result. When QAY 9999 was achieved in late 2011, a second alphabetical sequence was incorporated and served as the suffix; the result was QAA 1 A. When QAA 9999 Y was achieved on 18 June 2020, the second alphabetical sequence was reset and the first alphabetical sequence was advance; QAB 1 A was the result.

Since 2011, several more divisions have exhausted their respective Qdx #### formats. In July 2013, Sibu and Mukah Divisions began issuing QS #### x plates after QSY 9999 was reached. This is followed by Miri Division, which began using the QM #### x format since 20 August 2015, after QMY 9999 was reached. Then, Bintulu's QTY 9999 was reached on 18 October 2023, the QTx #### was replaced with "QDx ####" plate on 7 December 2023. The Sibu and Mukah Divisions began issuing QEx #### plates in August 2026 after QS 9999 Y was reached. Sarikei Division began issuing QFx #### plate after QRY 9999 was reached.

Registration plates of Sarawak
Prefix (x)	State	Current Plate	Current Bidding Plate
QA	Kuching	QAB_Q	QAB_Q
QB	Sri Aman and Betong	QBJ	QBJ
QC	Samarahan and Serian	QCX	QCX
QD	Bintulu	QDF	QDG
QE	Sibu and Mukah	QEA	QEA
QF	Sarikei	QF	QF
QK	Kuching (Exhausted in 2004)	QKY	QKY
QL	Limbang	QLG	QLG
QM	Miri	QM_V	QM_V
QP	Kapit	QPE	QPF
QR	Sarikei (Exhausted in 2026)	QRY	QRY
QS	Sibu and Mukah (Exhausted in 2026)	QS_Y	QS_Y
QT	Bintulu (Exhausted in 2023)	QTY	QTY
SG, QSG	Sarawak Government	None	None

=== History of Sarawakian registration numbers ===
==== Pre-1991 ====
Before the formation of the Malaysia in 1963, the Sarawak's vehicle number plates were originally distinguished only by nDx (n = Number, D (constant letter) = Division, x = Alphabet) prefixes which represented the then five Administrative Divisions in Sarawak, followed by a number sequence which ranged from 1 to 9999; an example would be 1Dx #### for the 1st Division, present-day Kuching Division.

Registration plates of Sarawak (Pre-1980s)
Prefix	Division
1D	1st Division (Present-day Kuching and Samarahan Divisions)
2D	2nd Division (Present-day Simanggang (Sri Aman and Betong Divisions)
3D	3rd Division (Present-day Sibu, Bintulu, Kapit and Sarikei Divisions)
4D	4th Division (Present-day Miri Division)
5D	5th Division (Present-day Limbang Division)

During the 1970s, Sarikei Division and Kapit Division were formed and split from the 3rd Division to become the 6th and 7th Divisions, and were therefore assigned the 6D and 7D prefixes respectively. By the 1980s, the original 1D and 5D prefixes had been gradually exhausted with the passing of time and were eventually replaced by single-lettered prefixes similar to that of Peninsular Malaysia. The 6D and 7D prefixes continued to be used well into 1991.

6DA 124 Q

Registration plates of Sarawak (Post-1980s–1991)
Prefix	Division
B	Simanggang Division (Sri Aman Division)
K	Kuching Division
L	Limbang Division
M	Miri Division
S	Sibu Division
6D	6th Division (Sarikei Division)
7D	7th Division (Kapit Division)

KH 7009 Q

==== Post-1991 ====
SG 2007 BQ

In 1991, a new format was adopted in which the suffix Q was moved to the front of the sequence in all Sarawakian number plates. The result is QK 1 which extended to QKY 9999. When the change took place, the SG prefix for Sarawakian government vehicles had been exhausted and an x was later placed in front of the Q suffix, resulting in a format that read SG #### xQ. Kuching Division registration plates were the most numerous in Sarawak and the KT #### Q series was issued halfway when the new QK prefix was enforced. The QA prefix later replaced the QK prefix for Kuching Division.

===== Example of the registration number plates in Sarawak =====
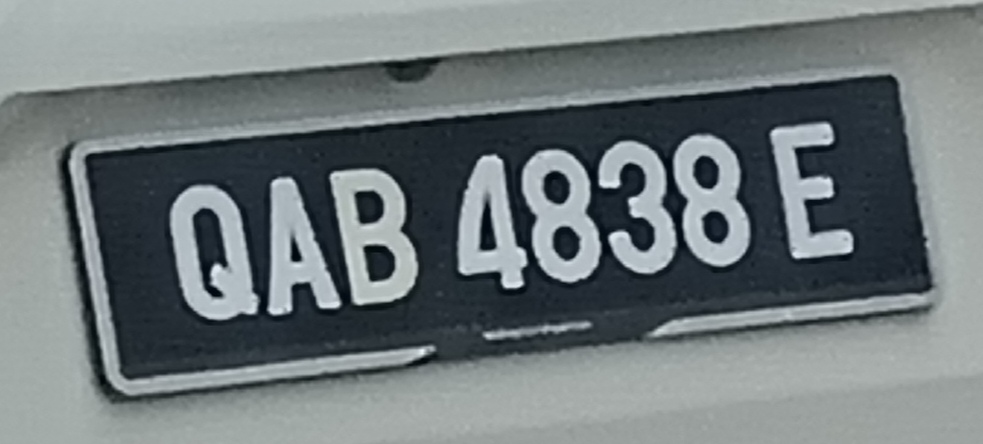
Kuching division registered number plate (present).

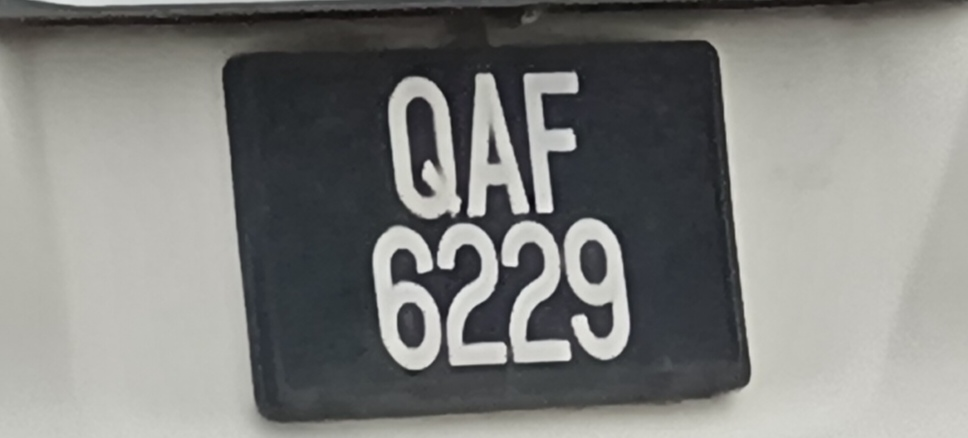
Kuching division registered number plate (previous).

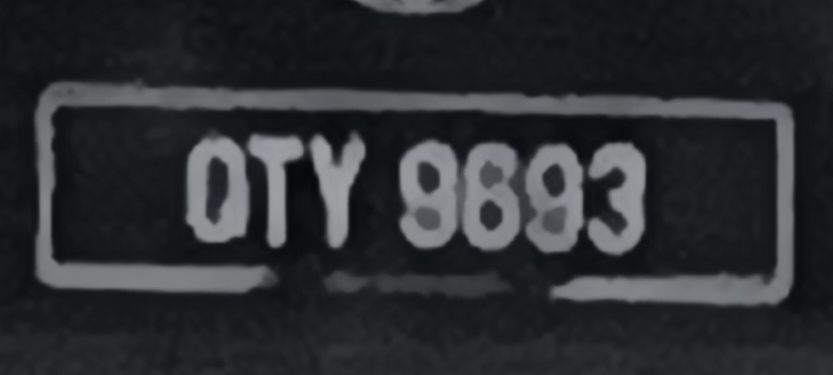
Bintulu division registered number plate (previous).

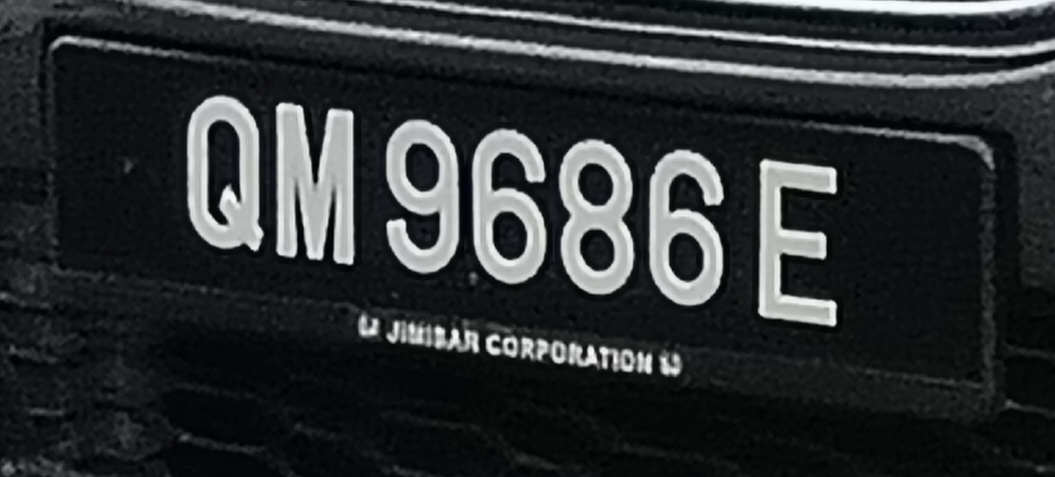
Miri division registered number plate (present).

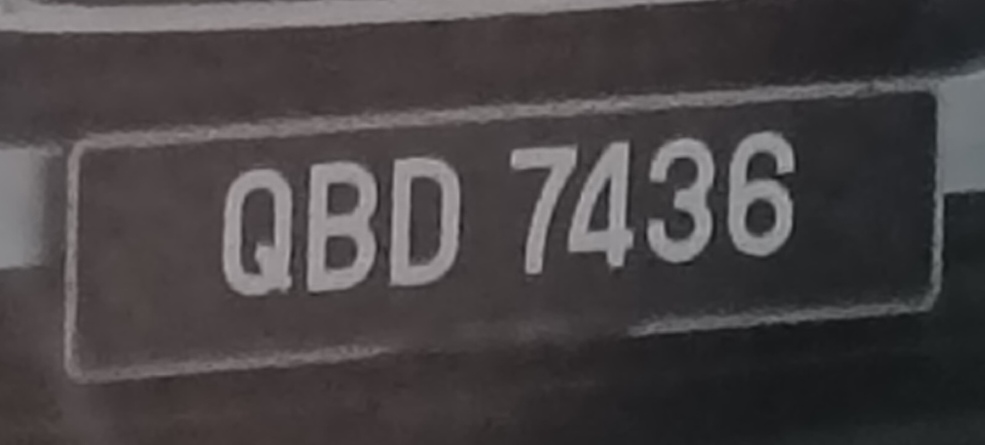
Sri Aman division registered number plate (present).

Samarahan division registered number plate (present).

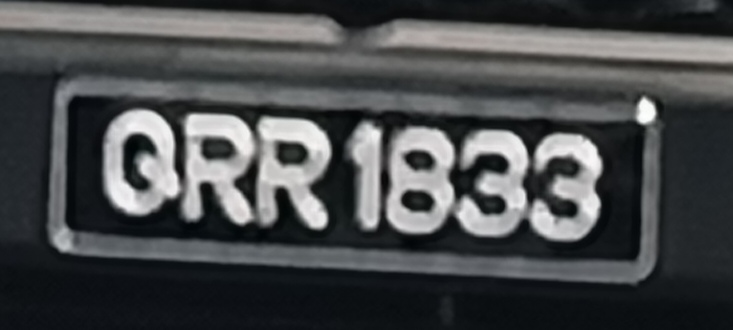
Sarikei division registered number plate (present).

A quirk of the KV series, present Sabahan plate format is the restriction of the use of Q or S as the suffix, justified by possible conflicts with specific older East Malaysian number plates ending with Q or S, specifically the Sarawakian xx #### Q format used between 1988 and 1991, and Sabah's early post-independence x #### S format; measures, however, have been taken to restrict the use of the old Sabahan format to accommodate the W series' use of disused Sabah x #### S numbers. Similar restrictions may be applied for future extended plates for the Johor, Selangor, Kelantan, Kedah and Malacca series due to overlaps with plate formats for Kota Kinabalu (J #### S), Betong/Sri Aman (B #### Q), Kuching (K #### Q), Miri (M #### Q), Beaufort (B #### S), Lahad Datu (D #### S) and Kudat (K #### S). However, finally present Kuching, Sibu, Miri and Keningau plates follow extended W series format (QAA #### Q, QAA #### S, QS #### Q, QS #### S, QM #### Q, QM #### S and SU #### Q) instead of the restriction.

== Sabah ==
=== Current format ===
SK 8012 F

SU 2297 A

SMA 6778

SAB 7638 P

SAA 289 R

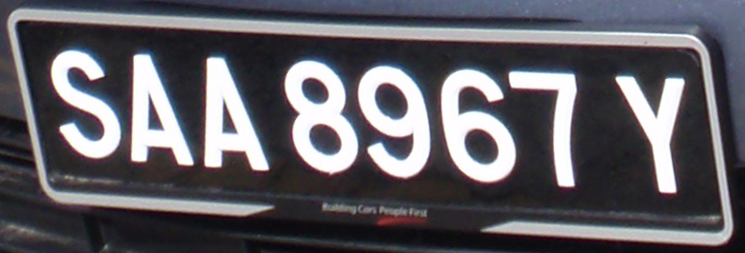
A Sabahan number plate.

All registration plates of Sabah (except Labuan which uses Lx) for private and commercial motorised vehicles, with the exceptions of those used by taxis, vehicle dealers and diplomats follow a Sdx #### x algorithm.

- S - The constant prefix for all Sabahan number plates.
- d - The division prefix. (e.g. : A = West Coast, T = Tawau, ...)
- x - The alphabetical sequences. (A-Y, except Q, S)
- # - The number sequence. (e.g. : 1, 2, 3 ... 9998, 9999)

Letters I, O, and Z are not used and there are no leading zeroes, as in the case of the Peninsular Malaysian number plates. Q and S are restricted from being used in the suffix to minimise confusion with the Sarawak's 1988–1991 Sibu Sx#### Q series, and Sabah's early post-independence x#### S format.

The current algorithm for the majority of Sabah's divisions start with the constant S prefix, followed by the division prefix and the number sequence. An example would be SA 1 of the West Coast Division. Once SA 9999 was reached, an alphabetical sequence was added and served as the suffix; SA 1 A was the result. When SA 9999 Y was achieved, a second alphabetical sequence was placed to the right of the division prefix and the first alphabetical sequence was reset; the result was SAA 1 A. When SAA 9999 Y was met, the second alphabetical sequences, SAB 1 A was the outcome. However, SY series was issued on 23 May 2018 after SAC 9999 F exhausted, instead of SAC #### G as a response to introduction of the suffix-less V series in Kuala Lumpur.

Historically, Sabah used the E series which bears no suffix and is similar to the number plate algorithm in Peninsular Malaysia. Once SY 9999 was reached, an alphabetical sequence was added to the right of the division prefix; SYA 1 was the result. After SYY 9999 was registered on 20 April 2023, the SY prefix was replaced by the SJ prefix on 1 July 2023. The West Coast Division encompasses the densely populated cities of Kota Kinabalu and Penampang. The SA series has thus become the most numerous number plate prefix in Sabah. On 8 July 2023, the state government approved the number plate SMJ (stands for the state motto Sabah Maju Jaya or Let Sabah Prosper; originally used for Sandakan after the SMH) as the government license plate after negotiations with JPJ reached agreement on that matter. For that reason, it was jumped from SMH directly to SMK, issued in May 2023. It is the second time a number plate is used as the state government plate license, after Sarawak's QSG (originally for Sibu after the QSF).

Registration plates of Sabah
Prefix (x)	State	Current Plate	Current Bidding Plate
SA	Kota Kinabalu (Exhausted in 2018)	SAC_F	SAC_F
SB	Beaufort	SB_L	SB_L
SD	Lahad Datu (Exhausted in 2026)	SD_Y	SD_Y
SJ	Kota Kinabalu	SJV	SJV
SK	Kudat	SK_H	SK_H
SL	Labuan (replaced)	SL_A	SL_A
L	Labuan	LH	LH
SM	Sandakan	SMX	SMX
SP	Lahad Datu	SPA	SPB
SS	Sandakan (Exhausted in 2018)	SSA_A	SSA_A
ST	Tawau (Exhausted in 2018)	STA_A	STA_A
SU	Keningau	SU_R	SU_R
SW	Tawau	SWT	SWT
SY	Kota Kinabalu (Exhausted in 2023)	SYY	SYY
SG, SMJ	Sabah Government	None	None

Labuan, a Federal Territory based on a former Sabahan territory, uses a standard L series based on the Peninsular Malaysian algorithm, unlike the other Sabahan divisions.

=== History of Sabahan registration numbers ===
==== Pre-1980s ====
EJA 8792

T 1659 S

Historically, number plate formats for Sabah, then known as North Borneo prior to the formation of the Malaysian federation in 1963, were similarly revised in multiple instances. During Chartered Company rule North Borneo number plates followed a similar format to that of Malaya, but were defined by its own set of regional prefixes based on capitals of the state's then current divisions. However, the old algorithm was quickly exhausted as only combinations such as d #### (d is the division) were possible. Following World War II and the declaration of North Borneo as a British Crown Colony, an E was added into the registration number prefix, with new registration numbers issued as Ed ####.

After North Borneo's independence from British rule and entry into the Malaysian federation, the E prefix was replaced by an S suffix, altering the format to d #### S, likely as a response to avoid conflicts with the Singaporean E to EZ series used between 1972 and 1984; the S suffix was also added to avoid further conflicts with Peninsular Malaysian formats. The Jesselton (J) division prefix was dropped in favour of an A prefix representing the West Coast Division following Jesselton's renaming to Kota Kinabalu in 1967.

Labuan, which was part of the Straits Settlements and had its own L series plates, fell under the jurisdiction of North Borneo and its vehicle plate was reformatted after 1946 in line with the state's number plate formats (EL #### and L #### S).

Despite their obsolescence, delisted Ed #### and d #### S numbers, including those using the J division prefix, may still be registered for new vehicles, as it does not conflict with current number plate formats in Malaysia.

==== Post-1980s ====
From the early 1980s, new Sabahan vehicle number plates were issued in the current Sdx #### S format.

Following the format change, Labuan plates were issued with the SLx #### S format until a format similar to its original Straits Settlements format, Lx ####, was reinstated in the mid-1990s, following Labuan's separation from the state in 1984 as an independent Federal Territory.

In 2017, both the Sandakan and Tawau Divisions exhausted SS 9999 Y and ST 9999 Y respectively and replaced them with the SSA 1 A and STA 1 A series on 20 October 2017 and 19 December 2017, respectively. Sandakan and Tawau are the second and third Divisions of to have a completed two-letter format.

In 2018, Kota Kinabalu and Sandakan retired the suffix format by changing to SY for Kota Kinabalu after SAC 9999 F and SM for Sandakan after SSA 9999 A. In 2019, SW for Tawau were issued after STA 9999 A officially retired on February 15, 2019. SP for Lahad Datu were issued after SD 9999 Y retired on June 21, 2026.

== Specialised plates, other schemes and miscellaneous ==
=== Taxi ===
HAC 3350

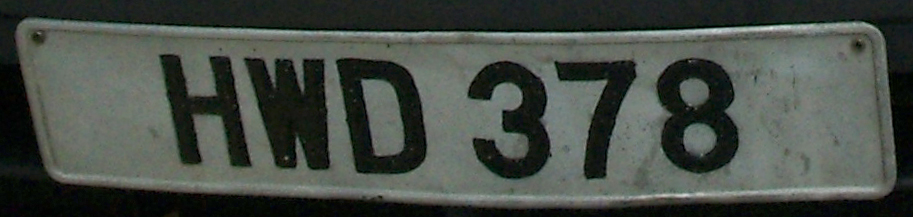
A Kuala Lumpur-registered "HW" taxi number plate.

Malaysian taxicab number plates follow a Hxx #### algorithm. While based on the Peninsular Malaysian registration plates, taxi plates usually incorporate a constant H (Hire) prefix and have non reflective plates with black characters on white background for distinction purposes.

- H - The constant prefix for all taxi number plates.
- x - The state or territory prefix. (e.g. : W = Kuala Lumpur, P = Penang)
- x - The alphabetical sequence. (e.g. : A, B, C ... X, Y)
- # - The number sequence. (e.g. : 0,1, 2, 3 ... 9998, 9999)

Registration plates of Malaysian taxis (post-1980s)
Prefix	State	Prefix	State
HA	Perak	HM	Malacca
HB	Selangor	HN	Negeri Sembilan
HC	Pahang	HP	Penang
HD	Kelantan	HQ	Sarawak
HE	Sabah (replaced)	HR	Perlis
HJ	Johor	HS	Sabah
HK	Kedah	HT	Terengganu
HL	Labuan	HW	Kuala Lumpur

The Kuala Lumpur HW is thus far the most widely issued of all the taxi prefixes, followed by Selangor's HB and Johor's HJ prefixes respectively. Previously taxis in Shah Alam use the HB #### SA format number plate.

LIMO 1130 W

The LIMO #### x format was introduced for Kuala Lumpur International Airport (KLIA) limousines following the opening of the airport in 1998. The LIMO prefix is a constant and is followed by the number and state suffixes, such as LIMO 4430 W and LIMO 3864 B. The service of the KLIA airport limousines largely cater to demand in Selangor and Kuala Lumpur. Thus, only the B or W state suffixes are used.

GET 1130

On July 3, 2026, the Malaysian Prime minister's Anwar launched Teksi Madani scheme with a new taxi's JPJEplate with red letters on white background with a silver stripe.

==== History of Malaysian taxi registration numbers ====
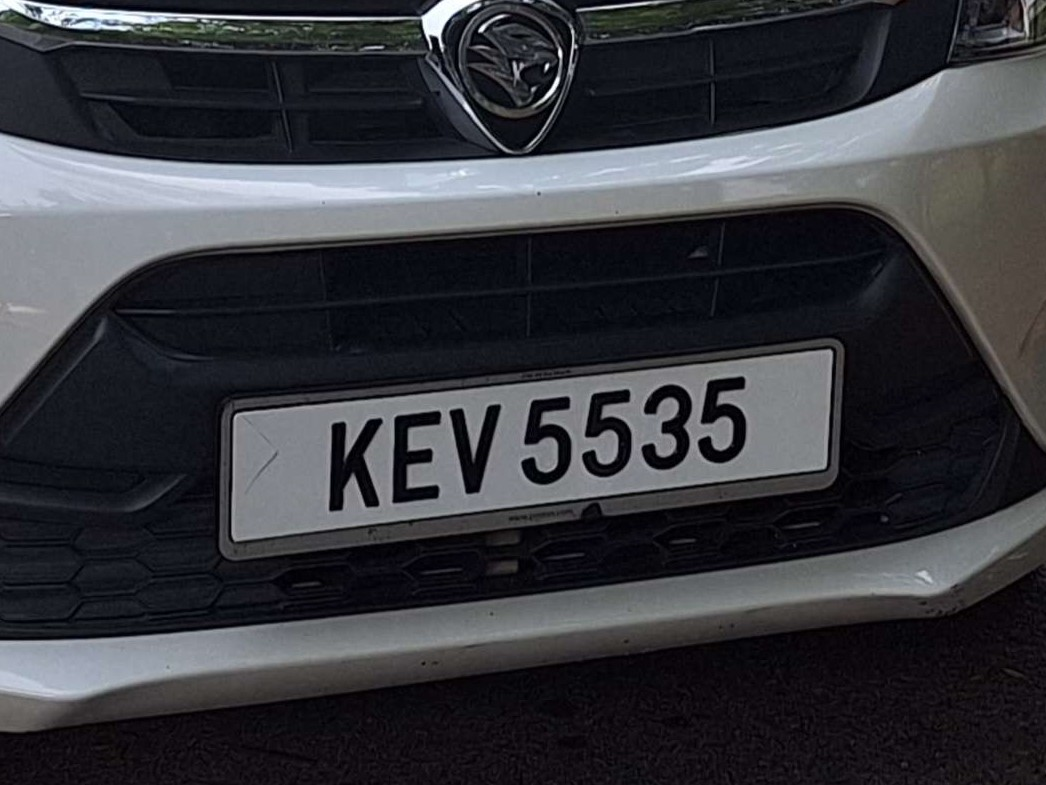
A Kedah-registered Kereta Sewa number plate.

Pre-1980s taxi number plates uses the same format as private vehicles based on the state of origin, but with the inversion of colours (black characters on white background). This format is also complemented by a Kereta Sewa (English: Rental Car) tag on the roof of taxis. Vehicles that are registered under the Kereta Sewa schemes differ from regular taxis such as offering long-distance cross-state travel, in contrast to regular taxis that only serves a specific city or region.

JCT 9896

This old format is widely used on rural taxis in less developed states such as Kelantan and Pahang, but has been widely replaced by the new Hxx #### format in the highly developed states, namely Kuala Lumpur, Selangor, Johor, Negeri Sembilan and Penang. However, taxi owners may still choose to opt for either the pre-1980s or post-1980s number plates as both are considered legal and valid. By the end of 2012, there were 39,384 taxis registered in Kuala Lumpur. A further 12,392 and 11,581 taxis were registered in Johor and Selangor respectively.

=== Foreign missions ===
==== Diplomatic Corps ====
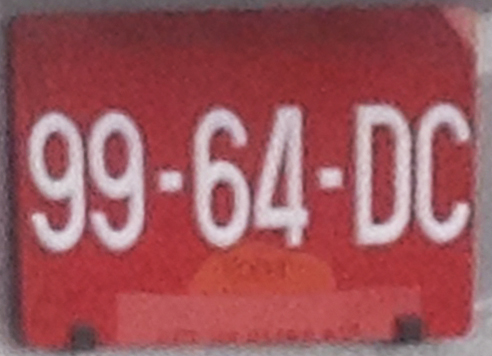
A Malaysian plate for a Yemeni diplomatic vehicle.

39-08-DC

The registration plates of diplomatic corps in Malaysia are very distinct from other number plate formats in the country. They follow a <1C>-<2C>-DC format and have either white characters on a red background or white characters on a black background. Furthermore, leading zeroes are used in addition to hyphens between the characters.

- <1C> - The first code denotes the nationality. (see list below)
- <2C> - The second code denotes a rank. (e.g. : 01 = Head of Mission's Official Car, 52 = Attaché)
- DC - The constant suffix which denotes Diplomatic Corps.

List of country codes on Malaysian diplomatic vehicle registration plates
Number	Country or Organisation	Number	Country or Organisation	Number	Country or Organisation
10	Sri Lanka	50	Czech Republic	90	Luxembourg
11	Thailand	51	Turkey	91	Kenya
12	Switzerland	52	Slovakia	92	Guinea
13		53	Finland	93	Kazakhstan
14	Libya	54	Kuwait	94	Ghana
15	Australia	55	Brazil	95	Kyrgyzstan
16	United States	56	Timor-Leste	96	Jordan
17	Pakistan	57	Iran	97	Cuba
18	Germany	58	Brunei	98	Senegal
19	Bangladesh	59	Oman	99	Yemen
20	Italy	60	Norway	100	European Union
21	Syria	61	Palestine	101	Nepal
22	Canada	62	Argentina	102	Papua New Guinea
23	Netherlands	63	Ukraine	103	Lebanon
24	Russia	64	Spain	104	Qatar
25	Belgium	65	Fiji	105	Maldives
26	Philippines	66	Morocco	106	
27	Romania	67	Mauritius	107	Azerbaijan
28	North Korea	68	Chile	108	
29	Indonesia	69	Sudan	109	Zambia
30	Poland	70	Nigeria	110	Vatican City
31	Eswatini	71	Mexico	111	Somalia
32	Egypt	72	Laos	112	
33	Sweden	73	Venezuela	113	Turkmenistan
34	Cambodia	74	Zimbabwe	114	Georgia
35	New Zealand	75	Hungary	115	Gambia
36	South Korea	76	Peru	116	
37	Austria	77	Algeria	117	Tajikistan
38	United Kingdom	78	Albania	118	El Salvador
39	Singapore	79	South Africa		
40	India	80	Bosnia and Herzegovina		
41	Myanmar	81	Ecuador		
42	Vietnam	82	Uruguay		
43	Denmark	83	Ireland		
44	Iraq	84	Colombia		
45	Seychelles	85	United Arab Emirates		
46	Japan	86	Croatia		
47	France	87	Afghanistan		
48	Saudi Arabia	88	Namibia		
49	China	89	Uzbekistan		

==== Consular Corps ====
49-02-CC

The registration plates of consular corps in Malaysia complement the number plates of the diplomatic corps. They follow a 1C-2C-CC format and have white characters on a black background. Leading zeroes and hyphens are also used.

- 1C - The first code denotes the nationality. (e.g. : 15 = Australia, 43 = Denmark)
- 2C - The second code which is dependent on a Malaysian state and denotes a rank. (e.g. : 01 = Head of Consular Mission in Kuala Lumpur, 02 = Head of Consular Mission in Penang)
- CC - The constant suffix which denotes Consular Corps.

==== United Nations ====
10-01-UN

Registration plates for vehicles registered under the United Nations (UN) in Malaysia use a 1C-2C-UN format. These plates are issued with white characters on a black background or white characters on a red background.

- 1C - The first code denotes an organisation within the UN. (e.g. : 10 = United Nations Development Programme, 11 = World Health Organization)
- 2C - The second code denotes a rank. (e.g. : 01 = Head of United Nations Office Official Car, 04 = Head of United Nations Office Personal Car)
- UN - The constant suffix which denotes United Nations.

==== Other international organisations ====
10-04-PA

A PA suffix is used for vehicles registered under other international organisations in Malaysia. They follow a similar format to that used for the diplomatic corps.

=== Military ===
ZC 5010

For all motorised Malaysian Armed Forces vehicles (including tracked vehicles and various armoured vehicles), number plates numbers with the Z prefix are utilised. Issued in a ZB #### format with white characters on a black background, there are no leading zeroes, and the letters I and O are not used.

- Z - The constant prefix for all Malaysian Armed Forces vehicles.
- B - The branch prefix. (e.g. : D = Malaysian Army, U = Royal Malaysian Air Force)
- # - The number sequence. (e.g. : 1, 2, 3 ... 9998, 9999)

Registration plates of the Malaysian Armed Forces
Prefix	Branch
Z, ZA, ZB, ZC, ZD	Malaysian Army; prior to the introduction of the ZL, ZU and ZZ series all military vehicles shared the same format.
ZL	Royal Malaysian Navy; L standing for "Laut" ("sea")
ZU	Royal Malaysian Air Force; U standing for "Udara" ("air")
ZZ	Malaysian Ministry of Defence (MINDEF)
T/Z	Military trailers

==== History of Malayan military registration numbers ====
05 ZF 45

26Z B92

Z 5403

The Z #### format is preceded by a ## Zx ## format introduced during large-scale procurement of road vehicles and armoured cars for Commonwealth armed forces at the height of the Malayan Emergency, a derivative of the registration plate format for British armed forces vehicles circa the late-1940s and 1950s.

Similar to its British counterpart, the ## Zx ## format was entirely incremental, except the Z designation indigenous to the region. For example, the series began from 00 ZA 01 to 00 ZA 99 before resuming at 01 ZA 00; when 99 ZA 99 was reached, the secondary letter incrementally progressed to 00 ZB 01 (skipping 00 Zx 00), restarting the cycle of numbers. The format may also be bisected in the middle to read as ##Z x##, as commonly depicted on Emergency-era Daimler Scout Cars; it may also be arranged vertically in parts of two where there is little horizontal space, such as on early Land Rovers. Some vehicles used during the Emergency were also registered under the British ## xx ## convention without a Z designation (most commonly the ## Bx ## range) as the vehicles were originally under Britain ownership.

By 1957, the ## Zx ## and ## xx ## formats are rendered obsolete following the introduction of the Z #### format under a new round of rationalisation. The old formats lingered well into the 1960s on a fraction of Emergency-era vehicles handed down to Malaya.

=== Royalty ===
TMJ

SJ

YTM TUNGKU TEMENGGONG KEDAH (AHLI JEMAAH PEMANGKU SULTAN KEDAH DARUL AMAN)

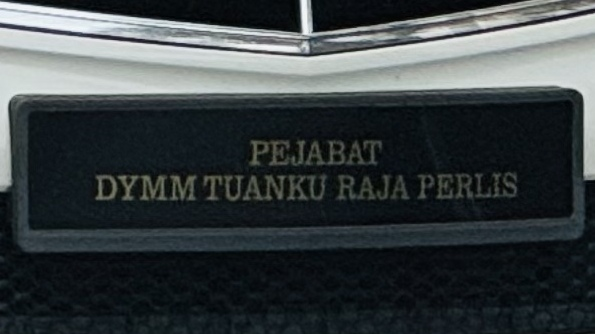
A registration plate for a car belonging to the office of the Raja of Perlis

The Sultans of Malaysia, Rulers of States and their immediate royalty use unique registration plates. Most of these official number plates have a yellow background and bear the official title or crest of the owners, such as "Tengku Mahkota Johor" of the Regent of Johore.

=== Trade plates ===
Malaysian trade plates, or temporary number plates, are carried by unregistered vehicles or vehicles without proper documents, such as road tax and insurance, and are largely used by authorised vehicle dealers in the country. Although most Peninsular Malaysian trade plates consistently follow a x #### x format and a white-on-blue colour scheme with leading zeroes for below 100th digits, trade plates in Sarawak similar to normal number plate with white character and red background, whereas those of Sabah follow a ### D prefix and feature red characters on a white background, similar to UK trader's plate. Until September 2013, Kuala Lumpur trade plates followed the usual W #### x format; with the launch of the extended W series that is completely identical in character format, the trade plate format was altered to W/TP #### and W/TS #### for motorcycles. Motorcycles bears trade plate with S suffix, other type of vehicles than motorcycles bears an A suffix for the x #### x format. Although currently Kuala Lumpur issues V series plates, trade plates remain unchanged and maintaining W/TP format.

The majority of trade plates are made from pressed alloy, but plastic ones are also commonly used to prevent scratches (usually in black background, technically it is illegal to use plastic trade plate).

Trade plates of Malaysia
Prefix	State	Example
B A	Selangor	B 3958 A
J	Sabah	670 J
W/TP	Kuala Lumpur	W/TP 5127
Q	Sarawak	KA 6328 Q

=== Trailer plates ===
T/BD 6125

Articulated lorries or semi-trailers feature two number plates placed at the rear of the trailer. One is designated for the tractor unit, and another for the trailer it pulls. The tractor unit's license number follows standard conventions for motorised vehicles, while the trailer's own number plate uses a T/Sx #### format, with the T/ prefix is a constant for all Malaysian trailers. Both plates have white characters on a black background.

Both states of Sarawak and Sabah didn't issued trailer plates for trailers (T/Q #### and T/S ####) instead trailers in both states were issued standard registration plates like other vehicles. However, both Sarawak and Sabah trailer plates were started issued since 2018 onwards.

=== Commemorative plates ===
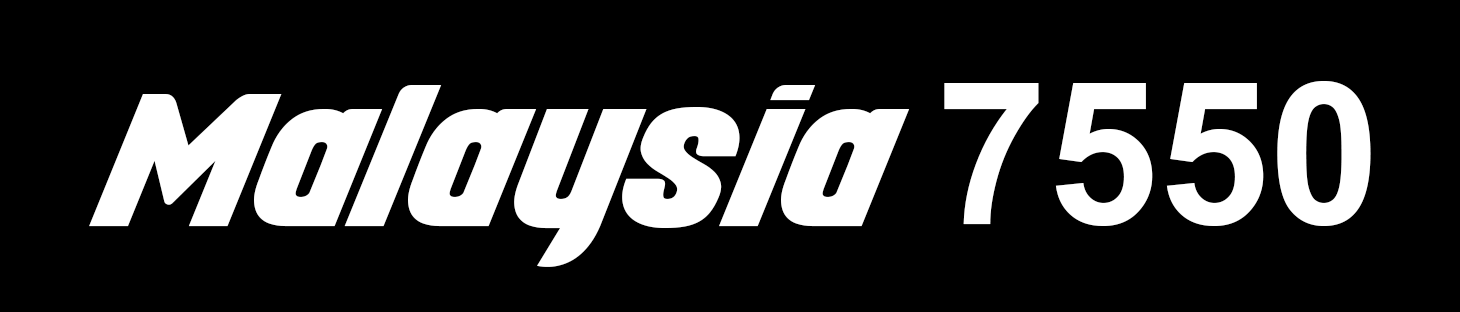

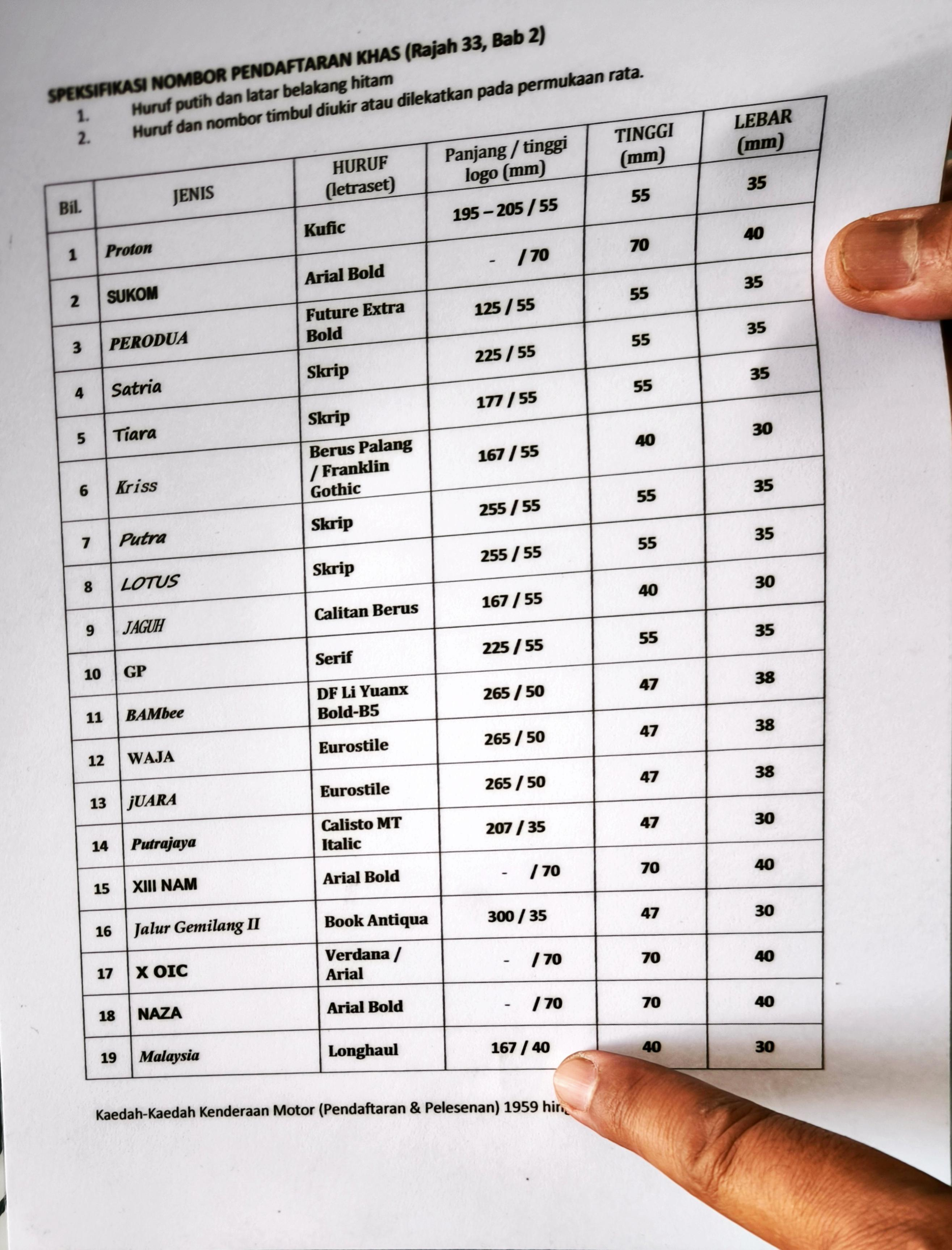
Special Registration Number Specifications as shown by the Technical Inspection Unit from Negeri Sembilan Road Transport Department (JPJ Negeri Sembilan) to a fancy number plate offender.

A limited number of commemorative vanity plates, or plates with distinctive prefixes are made available by the Malaysian Road Transport Department at a higher cost. These special plates may be used to denote the manufacturer of the car, such as the Proton prefix for Proton cars or special events, such as the SUKOM prefix for the 1998 Commonwealth Games.

Commemorative plates of Malaysia
Prefix	Notes
Malaysia	Malaysia number plate series. The font used is LongHaul for letters and Arial Black for numbers.
1M4U	Issued in March 2013 to symbolise the 1Malaysia for Youth (IM4U) concept.
A_A	A_A number plate series, commemorating JPJ/RTD's 79th anniversary
A1M	Yayasan Artis 1Malaysia, a foundation set up in support of local performing artists including actors, singers and musicians who have aged, deteriorated in health or deceased. Only run from 'A1M 1' to 'A1M 1000'
ANSARA	Persatuan Bekas Pelajar MRSM (ANSARA)
BAMbee	Issued only during the 2000 Thomas and Uber Cup which was held in Kuala Lumpur that year.
Chancellor	Issued for Proton Chancellor cars.
Comel	Issued for Comel motorcycle brand, now bankrupt.
E	E number plate series
EV	Electric Vehicle number plate series
FFF	FFF number plate series, commemorating JPJ/RTD's 78th anniversary
G	G series number plates by Lee Chong Wei Foundation
GG	Great Generation
G_G	‘G1G’ to ‘G999G’ number plate series
GM	Issued in conjunction with the 62nd Malaysia Day (2025) celebrations, stands for 'Gemilang Malaysia' (Glory Malaysia). Winning bidders are offered 2 tickets to the Super GT Malaysia festival in 2026.
GT	Proposed by Kelab Eksplorasi 7 Benua Malaysia (KE7B)
GTR	Issued by Pertubuhan Suara Wanita Malaysia, range from ‘GTR 1’ to ‘GTR 1000’
G1M	Issued to symbolise the Gagasan 1Malaysia concept.
GOLD	GOLD (in conjunction with the 50th anniversary of Federal Territories)
GP	Issued for the cars used by officials during GrandPrix at Sepang International Circuit.
H	Issued in conjunction with the 63rd Malaysia Day (2026) celebrations, stands for 'Harmoni' (Harmony).
IQ	IQ number plate series, IQ 1 to IQ 999
IM	IM number plate series
JAGUH	Issued for Modenas Jaguh motorcycle. The font used is FRANKLIN GOTHIC BOLD for letters and Arial Black for numbers.
Jalur Gemilang II	"Jalur Gemilang 2" is a one-off number plate issued to an individual travelling overland around the world back in early 2000s.
KRISS	Issued for Modenas Kriss motorcycle.
K1M	Kembara 1 Malaysia, only run from 'K1M 1' to 'K1M 100'
LOTUS	Issued for Lotus cars.
MADANI	Issued for Malaysia Madani's supporter cars.
M_M	Issued in conjunction with Malaysia's 66th National Day celebrations, stands for ‘Malaysia Merdeka’.
NAZA	Issued for certain Naza vehicles.
NAAM	New Affirmative Action Movement
NBOS	National Blue Ocean Strategy
P_P	P_P number plate series, commemorating JPJ/RTD's 80th anniversary
PATRIOT	Issued on 24 June 2015
PERFECT	Fund-raiser for the Table Tennis Association of Malaysia, only run from 'PERFECT 1' to 'PERFECT 100'
PROTON	Issued for certain Proton cars.
PERODUA	Issued for certain Perodua cars.
PETRA	Kementerian Peralihan Tenaga Dan Transformasi Air.
Putra	Issued for Proton Putra cars.
Putrajaya	Issued in 1995 during the establishment of Federal Territory of Putrajaya. The font used is CALISTO MT ITALIC for letters and Arial Black for numbers.
Persona	Issued for Proton Persona cars.
Perdana	Issued for Proton Perdana cars.
Q	Introduced by the Football Association of Sarawak (FAS)
QQ	QQ number plate series
RAPID	Issued for RapidKL On-Demand service vans and minibusses
RIMAU	Referred to Malayan Tiger Mascot in 2017 SEA Games for the ASEAN region hosting by Malaysia
ROBOVAN	Issued for Malaysia’s First Street-Legal Driverless Vehicle called RoboVan. Start with ROBOVAN-01, ROBOVAN-02, ROBOVAN-03 and so on
Satria	Issued for Proton Satria cars.
SAS	Issued on 5 September 2014 to symbolise KDYMM Sultan Ahmad Shah of Pahang (SAS) in conjunction with Sultan Ahmad Shah’s 40th anniversary.
SAM	Saya Anak Malaysia
SIS	The SIS plate is mark conjunction with the 25th anniversary of the reign of DYMM Sultan Sharafuddin Idris Shah Alhaj
SMS	The SMS plate is in celebration of the Sultan of Kedah's two-term reign as the Yang di-Pertuan Agong
SUKOM	Issued only during the 1998 Commonwealth Games which was held in Kuala Lumpur that year.
Tiara	Issued for Proton Tiara cars.
TTB	Transformasi Terengganu Baharu (New Terengganu Transformation) Issued in January 2016 after TBS 9999
T1M	Transformasi 1 Malaysia, only run from 'T1M 1' to 'T1M 1000'
U	The ‘U’ series – U 1 to U 9999 – allows for a short number plate with only one alphabet.
UU	UU number plate series
UUU	UUU number plate series
US	"Untuk Seniman" is brought about by the Malaysian Artistes Association (Seniman), only run from 'US 1' to 'US 1000'
UP	UP number plate series stands for Unique Plates, runs from ‘UP 1’ to ‘UP 999’
UA	UA number plate series
UT	Universiti Pertahanan Nasional Malaysia (UPNM) number plate series
UMT	Universiti Malaysia Terengganu number plate series
UM	Universiti Malaya number plate series
UNIMAS	Universiti Malaysia Sarawak number plate series
UNISZA	Universiti Sultan Zainal Abidin number plate series
UTM	Universiti Teknologi Malaysia number plate series
UTEM	Universiti Teknikal Malaysia Melaka number plate series
UKM	Universiti Kebangsaan Malaysia number plate series
UUM	Universiti Utara Malaysia number plate series
USM	Universiti Sains Malaysia number plate series
UiTM	Universiti Teknologi Mara number plate series
UPM	Universiti Putra Malaysia number plate series
UTHM	Universiti Tun Hussein Onn number plate series
IIUM	International Islamic University Malaysia number plate series
UMK	Universiti Malaysia Kelantan number plate series
UR	Universiti Malaysia Perlis number plate series
UC	Universiti Malaysia Pahang number plate series
UG	Universiti Pendidikan Sultan Idris number plate series
UN, UQ	Universiti Sains Islam Malaysia number plate series
VIP	Visit Pahang Year 2017
VIPS	'Visit Impressive Perlis State'. The series of vehicle registration number plates in conjunction with the 25th anniversary of the Raja of Perlis Tuanku Syed Sirajuddin Jamalullail's rule.
V_MY	Visit Malaysia 2026 campaign
WAJA	Issued for Proton Waja cars.
WCEC	World Chinese Entrepreneurs Convention (WCEC) Commemorative Plates used for events 17th WCEC in Malaysia in 2024, Issued from 1 to 100 only.
X	X number plate series
XX	XX number plate series
XIIINAM	Issued for the 13th Summit of the Non-Aligned Movement, held in Kuala Lumpur from 20 to 25 February 2003. The Roman numeral XIII stands for the thirteenth summit.
XOIC	Issued for the 10th Islamic Summit of the Organisation of Islamic Cooperation, hosted in Putrajaya in October 2003, with the main sessions from 16 to 18 October. The Roman numeral X stands for the tenth summit.
XI ASEAN	Issued for the 11th ASEAN Summit and Related Summits, held in Kuala Lumpur from 12 to 14 December 2005, which also included the first East Asia Summit. XI is the Roman numeral for eleven.
XXVIASEAN	Issued for the 26th ASEAN Summit, which Malaysia hosted in Kuala Lumpur and Langkawi on 26 and 27 April 2015 under the theme Our People, Our Community, Our Vision. XXVI is the Roman numeral for twenty-six.
XXVII ASEAN	Issued only during the 27th ASEAN Summit and Related Summits, held in Kuala Lumpur from 21 to 22 November 2015, the second of the two summits Malaysia hosted as ASEAN chair that year. XXVII is the Roman numeral for twenty-seven.
ASEAN XV	Issued only during ASEAN event series in which the Roman numeral gives the event's number, 15th.
XXXIDB	Issued to members and participants of the 2005 30th Islamic Development Bank Annual Meeting.
Y	Yayasan Nur Jauhar, the foundation aspires to provide aid and assistance to the underprivileged community in Sabah regardless of their background, religion or ethnic group.
YY	YY number plate series
YA	YA number plate series
YC	YC number plate series

It was noted that G1M number plates were often abused on luxury vehicles to evade motor vehicle import, excise and sales duty in mainland because G1M series could be registered in Langkawi and Labuan, both islands having duty-free status (motor vehicles registered in both islands are exempted from mainland motor vehicle duties). As a result, numbers under the IM4U series are not allowed to be registered in Langkawi and Labuan.

==== Booked prefixes/Highest-bidding plates/Meaningful plate prefixes ====
Unique prefixes such as repeated letters (XXX) became the plates with most bids, starting with AAA issued in 1977, BBB in 1978, JJJ in 2005, CCC in 2007, WWW in 2012, and RR in July 2017 to August 2017; DDD started to be issued on 13 September 2017; PPP started bidding from 5 to 9 November 2020 and starts issued on 26 to 28 November 2020; FF started bidding from 14 to 19 May 2023 and starts issued on 6 June 2023; FFF started bidding from 11 to 15 May 2024. The most expensive plates as of 2016 is "F 1" which bid at RM836,660, "W 1 N" (similar to "Win") at RM748,000 in 2014 and "WWW 1" at RM520,000 in 2012, both owned by Sultan of Johor which is previously bid the "JJJ 1" plate at RM165,000. "DDD 2" was won by Yang Dipertuan Agong Sultan Muhammad V at RM385,000 shortly after being issued.

In November 2014, plate prefix "BMW" series issued and open for bidding which very popular among BMW owners. "BMW 1" and "BMW 2" were reserved for Selangor Royal Family. "BMW 6" is owned by national badminton player Lee Chong Wei.

In February 2015, plate prefix "RM" issued in Perlis open for bid, which is similar to Malaysian ringgit currency symbol. "RM 1" plate was reserved to Raja Perlis, Tuanku Syed Sirajuddin when "RM 2" to "RM 7" except "RM 5", which belongs to Tengku Amir Shah, Raja Muda (Crown Prince) of Selangor, was reserved to Perlis state EXCO's. "RM" becomes highest-bidding serial plate at more than RM7 million.

In July 2016, plate prefix "F 1" issued in Putrajaya was bid at RM836,660, again by Sultan of Johor. The "F 1" plates, are similar to Formula One acronyms.

Plate prefix AKU which means me or I am in Malay, were issued in August 2017, with AKU 1 bidded at RM207,898.90 when AKU 8055 which means "I'm boss" in Malay, at RM74,000.

Plate prefix SYG (Sayang) which means Dear or Honey in Malay, were issued in June 2020, with SYG 1 bidded at RM115,000 when SYG 8055 which means "Dear Boss" in Malay, at RM19,000.

Plate prefix PPP were issued in November 2020, with PPP 1 bidded at RM260,000 when PPP 9 at RM160,000. PPP 6 at RM140,000. PPP 8999 at RM12,888. PPP 1 and PPP 6 owned by Lee Chong Hoon, brother of national badminton player Lee Chong Wei. PPP serial numbers for vehicle registration which was opened for five days managed to collect the highest revenue at RM7.3 million, surpassing the SYG serial numbers before this at RM3.6 million.

In February 2021, plate prefix KFC issued in Kedah open for bid, which is similar to Kentucky Fried Chicken. KFC 7 bidded at RM52,000, KFC 8 and KFC 9 bidded at RM48,000, KFC 3 bidded at RM45,000.

Among other sought-after prefixes are plates which are similar to Malaysia's political party acronyms, such as MCA, PAP, DAP, PAS, PKR and PKM. Vanity issue "MM 1" belongs to a former Prime Minister Mahathir Mohamad. MCM prefix are popular on Malaccan government vehicles due to MCM possibly denoting Malacca Chief Minister - and acronyms of states' official names such as JDT can stand for Johor Darul Takzim and KDA might stand for Kedah Darul Aman. The JPJ plates which stands for Jabatan Pengangkutan Jalan, a Road Transport Department's acronym in Malay, were partially reserved for brand-new Malaysian Road Transport Department's fleet vehicles, while JMF and JVF plates are used by the vehicles owned by Johor Military Forces.

=== Border crossing ===
==== To and from Brunei ====
Older Brunei number plates bear similarity to the Malaysian state of Selangor and Kedah number plates which also begin with "B" and "K". The newer Brunei number plates have font shape and size that can easily differentiate them from Malaysian registered vehicles. Although the similarities, Malaysia registered vehicle with number plates "B" and "K" usually allowed to enter Brunei, and vice versa.

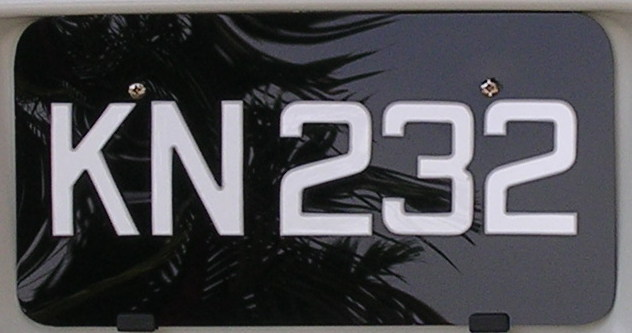
A Brunei number plate. It looks almost similar with Malaysian format with white on black letters and numbers

==== To and from Thailand ====
Due to the language barrier that arises from the use of Thai and Romanised scripts for vehicle plates registered in Thailand and Malaysia, respectively, road vehicles crossing the Malaysia–Thailand border are typically required to bear stickers in the front and back that translate the characters of the plates into those understandable in the country of entry.

Although this is not a mandatory requirement under the ASEAN Accord for vehicles having Romanised plates, some Malaysian vehicles travelling beyond 50 kilometres of the Malaysia–Thailand border may bear permanent stickers that translate Romanised letters of the Malaysian number plates into Thai, but are otherwise identical in both the use of numerical characters and colour schemes; however, a note to indicate *(STATE)*MALAYSIA* under the vehicle registration is obligatory. The stickers do not have to be removed upon re-entry into Malaysia. Entering heavy goods vehicles from Malaysia are also required to bear a separate Thai Trade Registration Number with yellow plates denoted by the 70-xxxx or 7x-xxxx series.

Entering Thai-registered vehicles, which use the Thai script for series letters and the province of registration on their number plates, are required to bear strips on the front and back that translate the plate information into a row of Romanised script (including the corresponding series prefix and 4-digit number, and the province in its official 3-letter abbreviation), resulting in a format that reads as AB 1234 PTN or 1AB 1234 BKK. Although the general practice is to use white characters on black, stickers with colour schemes that resemble their original plate colours may also be acceptable; stickers that emulate the layout and colour of the Thai plates have also been known to be used.

==== To and from Singapore ====
Some Malaysian number plate had notably conflicted with the Singapore's W series for engineering plant vehicles and British-sourced 4×4s, Q series for government vehicles, S series for Singapore private vehicles. Moreover, the presence of a suffix letter on both Malaysian and Singaporean respective W, Q and S series results on both completely identical plates. These conflicting similarities can pose problems such as enforcing RON 95 subsidized petrol fuels to Malaysian registered vehicles only. As an example, a Sabah registered vehicle being mistakenly barred from purchasing RON 95 fuel in a petrol station due to its plate format being ambiguous as a Singaporean private vehicle plate. Several other states, federal territories and commemorative series in Malaysia have also conflicted with Singaporean formats that classifies by vehicle types. However, unlike Singapore license plates which requires a suffix letter for checksum (with the exception of some governmental vehicles and private vehicles registered before 1969), most Malaysian plate formats do not feature a suffix letter at the end after the numeric digits, thus eliminating the ambiguity.

Examples of overlapping with Singapore series:

Malaysian registration plate formats having similarities with Singapore registration plate formats
Algorithm (Malaysia)	Algorithm (Singapore)
Ax #### (Perak); A #### A (Commemorative Series)	Ax #### y (Motorcycles registered prior to mid-1980s)
CB #### (Pahang)	CB #### y (School buses)
Exx #### (Pre-1980s Sabah)//EV ####(Electric Vehicles)	Ex #### y (1972-1984 Private vehicles series)
Fx #### (Putrajaya)	Fx #### y (Motorcycles)
G #### / GG #### / GP ####/ G ### G(Commemorative Series)	Gxx ##### y (Light Goods vehicles)
MP #### (Malacca)	MP ## (Military Police motorcycles)
Px #### (Penang); P #### P (Commemorative Series)	Px #### y (Private Buses using formats PA, PC, PD, PH; Pulau Ubin vehicles using PU)
Q/Qx/Qxx #### / Q/Qx/Qxx #### x (Sarawak )	Q/Qx/Qxx #### y (Pre-1998 company vehicles, private ambulances, except government vehicles with QX and QY prefixes)
Rx #### (Perlis)	Rx #### y (Restricted Use vehicles using format RU; Research and Development format using RD)
SG #### (Sabah & Sarawak Government)	SG #### y (Public buses)
SJx #### (West Coast, Sabah)	SJ #### / SJx #### y (Supreme Court Justice vehicles and 2007-2010 Private vehicles)
SMx #### (Sandakan, Sabah)	SMx #### y (2018-2021 Private vehicles and public buses using SMB prefixes)
SP_ #### (Lahad Datu, Sabah)	SP ####/SP_ #### _ (Speaker of Parliament, 2025-Present Private vehicles and Singapore Police Force)
Sxx #### x (Sabah divisions with extended series)	Sxx #### y (Private vehicles, pre-1972 and 1984–present formats)^{[a]}
TP #### (Terengganu)	TP #### y (Traffic Police motorcycles)
Wx #### / Wx #### x (Kuala Lumpur first series including extended)	Wx #### y (Engineering plant vehicles and Land Rovers & Jeeps)
XX #### (Commemorative series)	Xx #### y (Very Heavy Goods vehicles)
Yx #### (Commemorative series)	Yx #### y (Heavy Goods vehicles)
"x" denotes sequencing or series. "y" denotes checksum suffix.

^{a}Pre-1969 registrations are not required to display a checksum letter, however checksum letters are retroactively added in LTA's database.

Malaysian vehicles entering Singapore that are registered in these W, Q, S and J (starting from 2026) series are not required to be further identified because the Singapore's Land Transport Authority already requires every Malaysian registered vehicle entering Singapore to apply for an Autopass Card which includes all detail of the vehicle, vehicle's owner, and the person who driving the vehicle in their system.

Singapore registered vehicles travelling to Malaysia are required to register the vehicles for the Vehicle Entry Permit (VEP) through the Road Transport Department Malaysia website and VEP registered vehicles will be issued non-transferable VEP-RFID tags which contain pertinent information that uniquely identifies the vehicles. This can only done at Malaysia land checkpoints. Toll transactions in Singapore land checkpoints using Singapore registered vehicles only uses the CEPAS 2.0 (not the newer version of CEPAS 3.0 which is part of account-based ticketing). Those who have different set of plates, having difficulties to read or using the illegal font (FE-Schrift) will not be allowed through.

Both the tractor and trailer of Malaysian registered semi-trucks are fitted with the "Hazardous Cargo" registrations plates upon entry into Singapore. The same characters of the Malaysian number plates are used, with the only visible changes being the standardised fonts which reflect that of Singapore's and the colour code, which features black characters on an orange background. The "Hazardous Cargo" number plates subject Malaysian semi-trailers to the same laws followed by Singaporean ones.

Buses belonging to Singapore operators that run the cross-border services exclusively have additional brake lights installed and stickers displaying the tax scheme, vehicle specifications, company address, speed limits and APAD/MOT hotlines (Talian Aduan MOT) so as to meet the Malaysian regulations.

==== To Indonesia ====
Malaysian registered vehicles located in Sabah or Sarawak entering the Kalimantan region of Indonesia are required to display a temporary cross-border plate, issued by the Indonesian National Police. The plates affixed to the both front and rear windshields of the vehicles. The cross-border license plates are completely independent of the Malaysian registered plates, and instead has its own independent registration. It follows the standard Indonesian format of LL NNNN LL, where "L" are letters of the Latin alphabet, and "N" numbers from "0" to "9". The first single-or-double-letter prefixes denote the area where the vehicle is registered, depending on the entry point of Malaysian vehicles entering the country. Unlike standard Indonesian formats, the plate's expiry is written in a more detailed date format (DD MMM YYYY), such as 31 DEC 2024 instead of MM•YY (December 2024 being 12•24). The temporary cross-border plates have an expiry date of 30 days from its date of issuance.

==== International "oval" number plate ====
Vehicles with Malaysian registration plates intended to be driven in countries beyond neighbouring countries are often required to carry an oval international number plate or sticker denoting the vehicle's country of registration on the rear of the vehicle. The current code for Malaysian international plates, introduced in 1967, is MAL.

Historically, a considerable number of codes were needed to represent the separate Malayan states that would later form Malaysia, undergoing various code changes since the first issue in 1932.

Historical international codes of present-day Malaysia
Code	Territory(s)	Years used
SS	Straits Settlements (Singapore, Penang, Province Wellesley, Malacca and Labuan)	1932–1948; 1932—1946 for Labuan; 1932—1952 for Singapore, replaced by SGP.
FM	Federated Malay States (Perak, Selangor, Pahang, Negri Sembilan)	1932–1948
JO	Johore	1932–1948
KL	Kelantan	1932–1948
TU	Trengganu	1932–1948
KD	Kedah	1932–1948
PS	Perlis	1932–1948
FM	Federation of Malaya	1948–1957
PTM	Federation of Malaya, transcribed In Malay (Persekutuan Tanah Melayu)	1957–1967; 1963—1967 for Sarawak and North Borneo; 1963—1965 for Singapore.
SK	Kingdom of Sarawak, Colony of Sarawak	1932–1963
SNB	State of North Borneo	1932–1955; 1946—1955 for Labuan.
CNB	Colony of North Borneo, including Labuan	1955–1963
