= Vehicle registration plates of the United Kingdom, Crown Dependencies and British Overseas Territories =

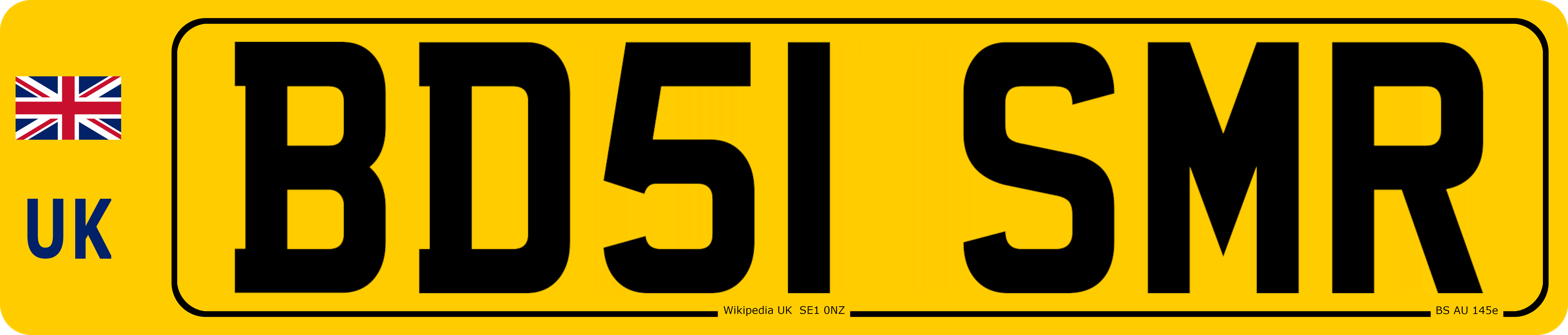

Vehicle registration plates of the United Kingdom, Crown Dependencies and British Overseas Territories include:

- Vehicle registration plates of the United Kingdom
- Vehicle registration plates of Northern Ireland
- Vehicle registration plates of the Isle of Man
- Vehicle registration plates of Jersey
- Vehicle registration plates of the Bailiwick of Guernsey
- Vehicle registration plates of Gibraltar
- Vehicle registration plates of the British Overseas Territories
