= Vehicle registration plates of Jersey =

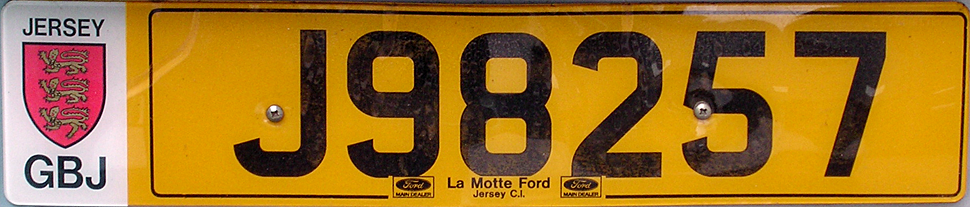
- JE regular legal standard front (top) and rear (bottom) number plates.
- Country: Jersey
- Country code: GBJ

Current series
- Size: 520 mm × 111 mm 20.5 in × 4.4 in
- Serial format: J123456
- Introduced: 1915

Availability
- Issued by: Driver and Vehicle Standards (DVS)

History
- First issued: c. 1915

Vehicle registration plates, commonly referred to as number plates, are the mandatory alphanumeric plates used to display the registration mark of a vehicle in Jersey. Vehicle registration marks are issued in Jersey by Driver and Vehicle Standards, a Government of Jersey department, and are entirely different from those issued in other jurisdictions.

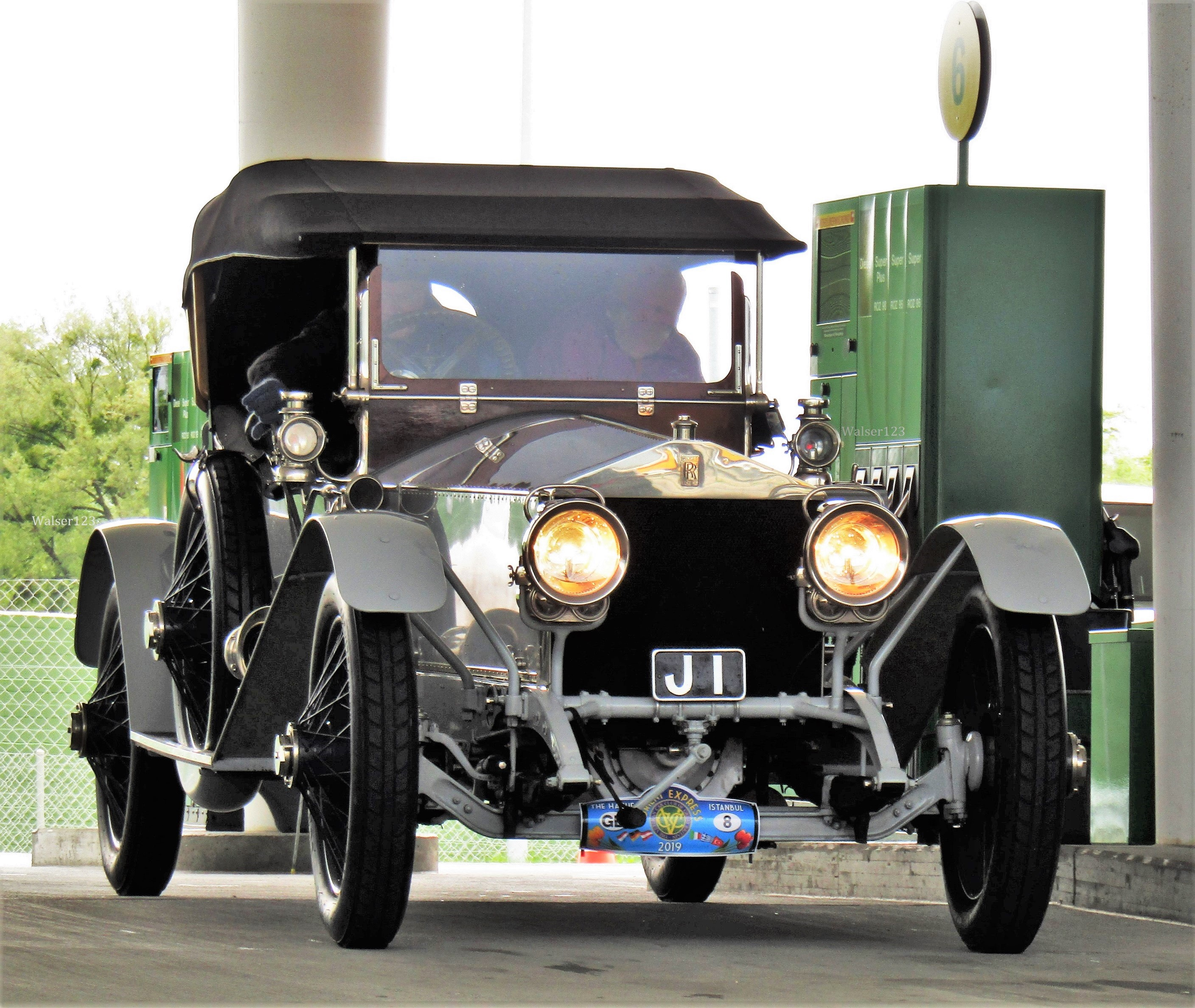
J1, the first Jersey number plate

== Standard plates ==
Jersey registration plates consist of the letter "J" followed by one to six digits; plates may incorporate the coat of arms of Jersey in a white strip on the left, above the country identifier GBJ (Great Britain and Northern Ireland – Jersey) and below the text JERSEY. This design is similar to the EU standard plate but it is not blue and is not valid under the Vienna Convention.

The standard format for registration marks in the island has been in use since 1915.

Standard issue plates in Jersey must be flat and unbroken and in the prescribed font according to British standards. It must be displayed on the front and rear of the vehicle (except on the front of motorcycles) and the rear plate must be illuminated at night. On vehicles issued after 1 January 1976, plates must be black on white at the front and black on yellow at the rear. Older vehicles may optionally display plates with white text on a black background.

Cherished plates are officially auctioned. Such is the desirability of low digit registration marks that these are often included in the auctions. (The new registered keeper purchases the right to display the registration mark rather than outright ownership of it.) Four digit registration plates – that is those plates of the format "J1234" – are sometimes made available by the Inspector of Motor Traffic and sell for multiple thousands of pounds. In 2020, one of the Lieutenant-Governor's number plates, J4, raised £380,000 at auction to fund the replacement of a diesel car with a new electric car at Government House.

== Special plates ==
Hire cars registered in Jersey display a silver letter "H" on a red background on the left of the registration plate.

On motorcycles, learner riders must display an L plate integrated into the registration plate and riders must display an integral P plate for the first 12 months after passing a motorcycle driving test.

The prefix "E" is used to designate temporary imports.

Where a vehicle is brought temporarily into Jersey... from a country in which the vehicle is not under the law of that country required to be registered, the Inspector may … assign to it an identification mark which shall be displayed on the vehicle as provided in that paragraph.
The Mark shall consist of the letter 'E' followed by a number.

— Jersey Legal Information

A Jersey "trader" plate has white letters on a red background and is made of a flexible magnetic material. These plates are for use by a bona fide motor trader on any unregistered vehicle being used in connection with the business of that motor trader.

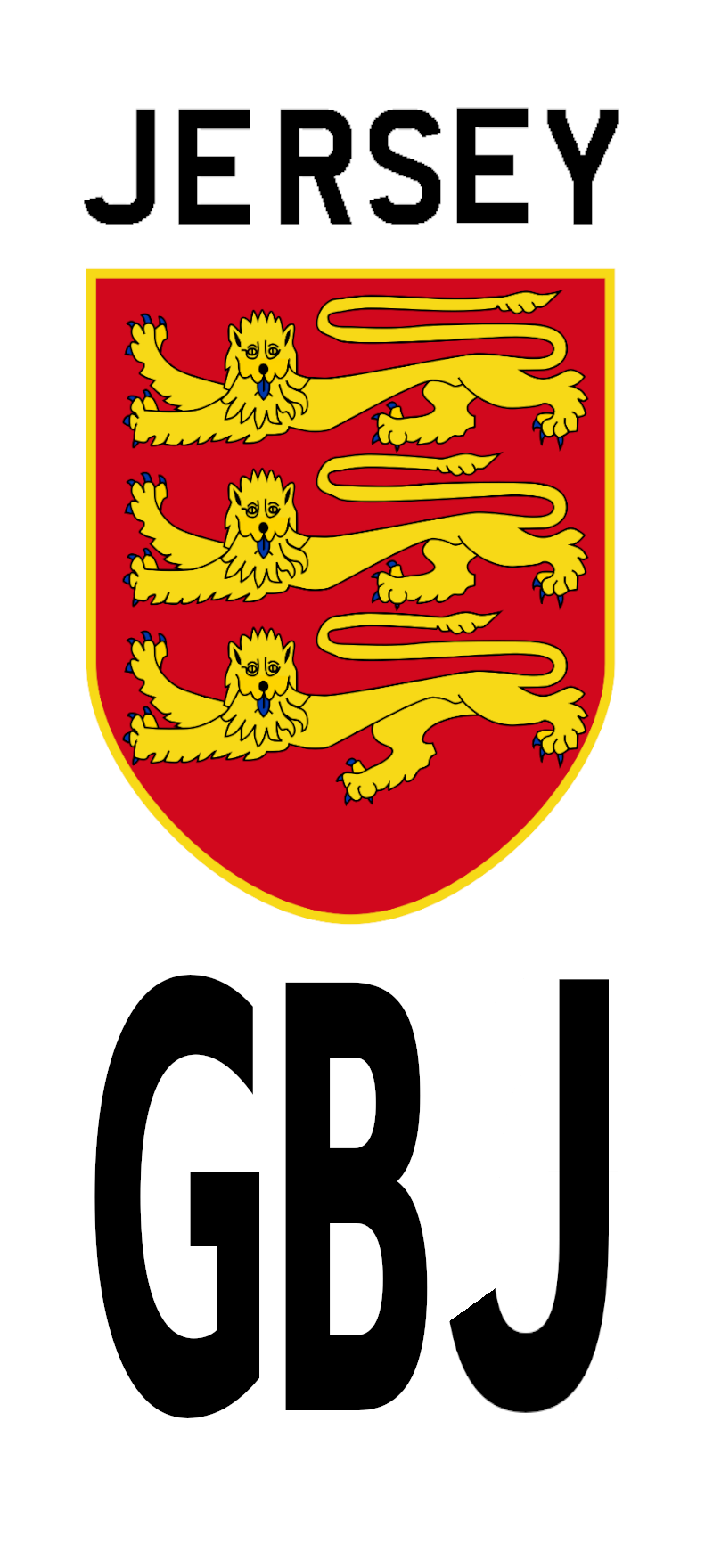
The Jersey (GBJ) identifier

A Jersey registration front plate bearing the GBJ identifier

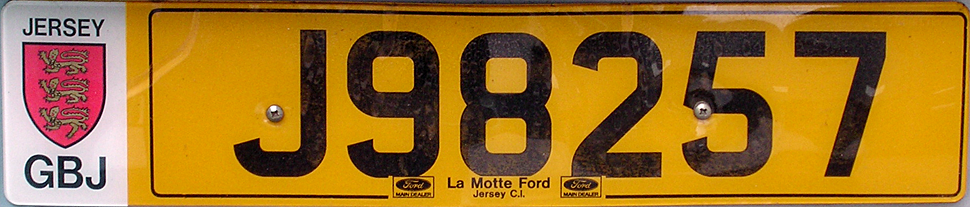
A Jersey registration rear plate bearing the GBJ identifier

== See also ==
- Vehicle registration plates of the Bailiwick of Guernsey
