= Vehicle registration plates of the Bailiwick of Guernsey =

Guernsey
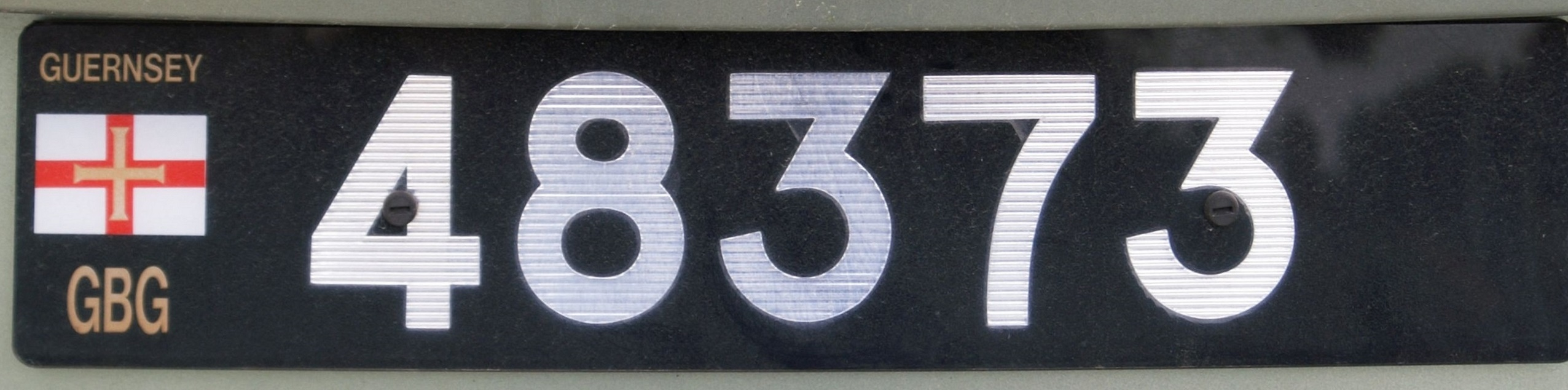
- Regular legal standard number plate from Guernsey.
- Country: Guernsey
- Country code: GBG

Current series
- Size: 520 mm × 110 mm 20.5 in × 4.3 in
- Serial format: Not standard
- Colour (front): White on black
- Colour (rear): White on black

Map showing the Channel Islands

Vehicle registration plates, commonly referred to as number plates, are the mandatory numeric or alphanumeric plates used to display the registration mark of a vehicle. The Crown dependency of Guernsey is outside the United Kingdom and the European Union, and its islands have registration marks that are different from those used in the UK. The international vehicle registration code for Guernsey is GBG.

== Guernsey ==
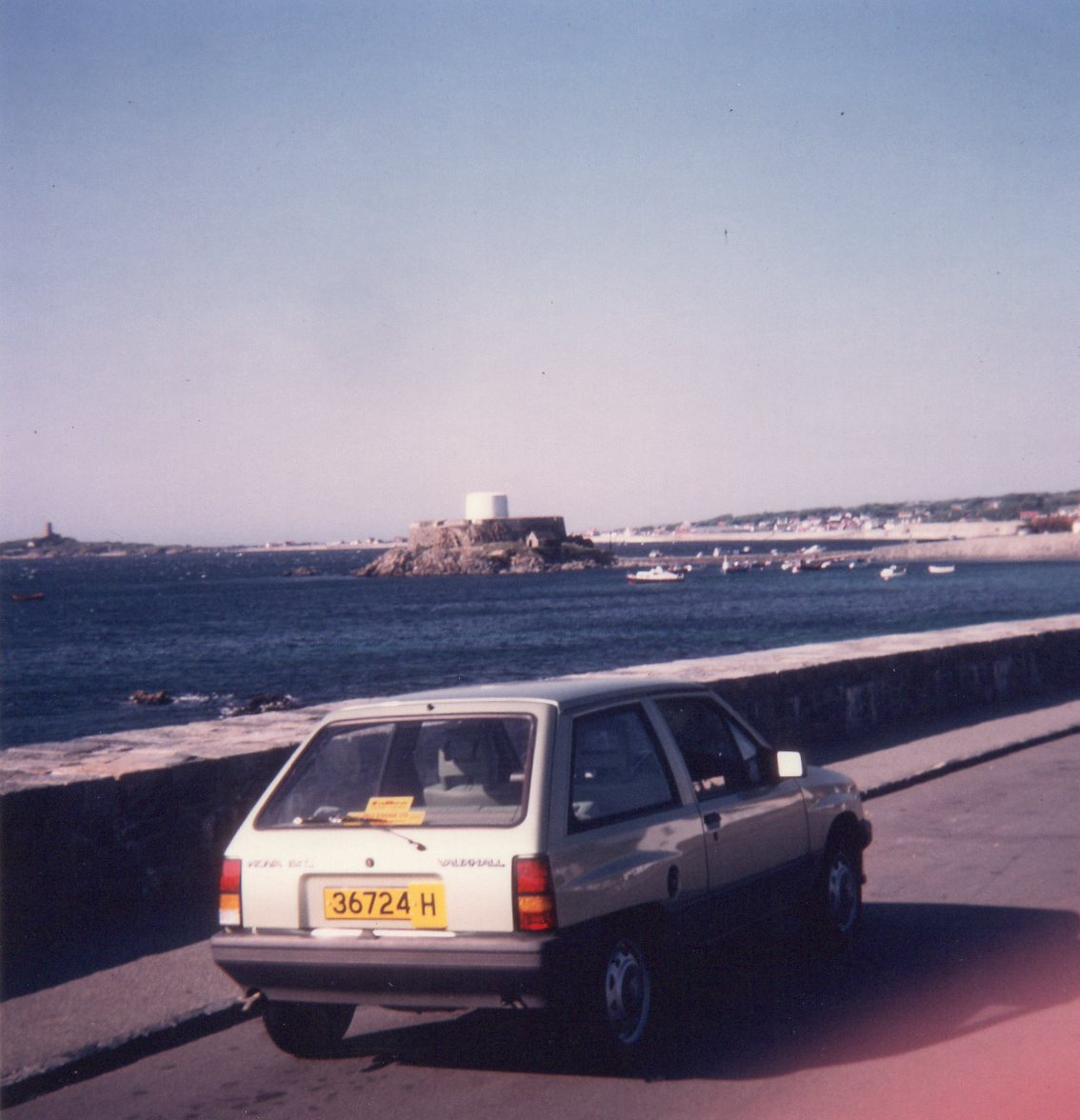
Hire car on Guernsey with "H" plate.

Guernsey plates have been compulsory since 1908. New vehicles cannot be used until they have been registered, though motor traders can get trade plates to drive new vehicles for business purposes. If a resident imports a vehicle, they must register it within 48 hours (for existing residents) or within 14 days (for new residents).

Guernsey plates consist of up to five digits, with no letters. An oval containing the letters GBG (Great Britain and Northern Ireland – Guernsey), the island's international vehicle registration code, is sometimes included. Newer Guernsey plates are silver numbers on a black background or the older style with black numbers on a white background (for the front) and black numbers on yellow background (for the back).

=== Special plates ===
Registration number 1 is reserved for, and displayed on the Bailiff of Guernsey's car. The official car of the Lieutenant Governor of Guernsey has no number plate. His private cars have G1 and G2 as registration numbers. Guernsey hire cars sport a black 'H' on a yellow background on a separate square plate.

=== Most expensive plates ===
From 2012, some number plates beginning with 0 and 00 were released to generate revenue for the island. Registration 007 is a highly desirable plate especially for fans of James Bond or "007" - the plate achieved £240,000 at an auction in September 2015.

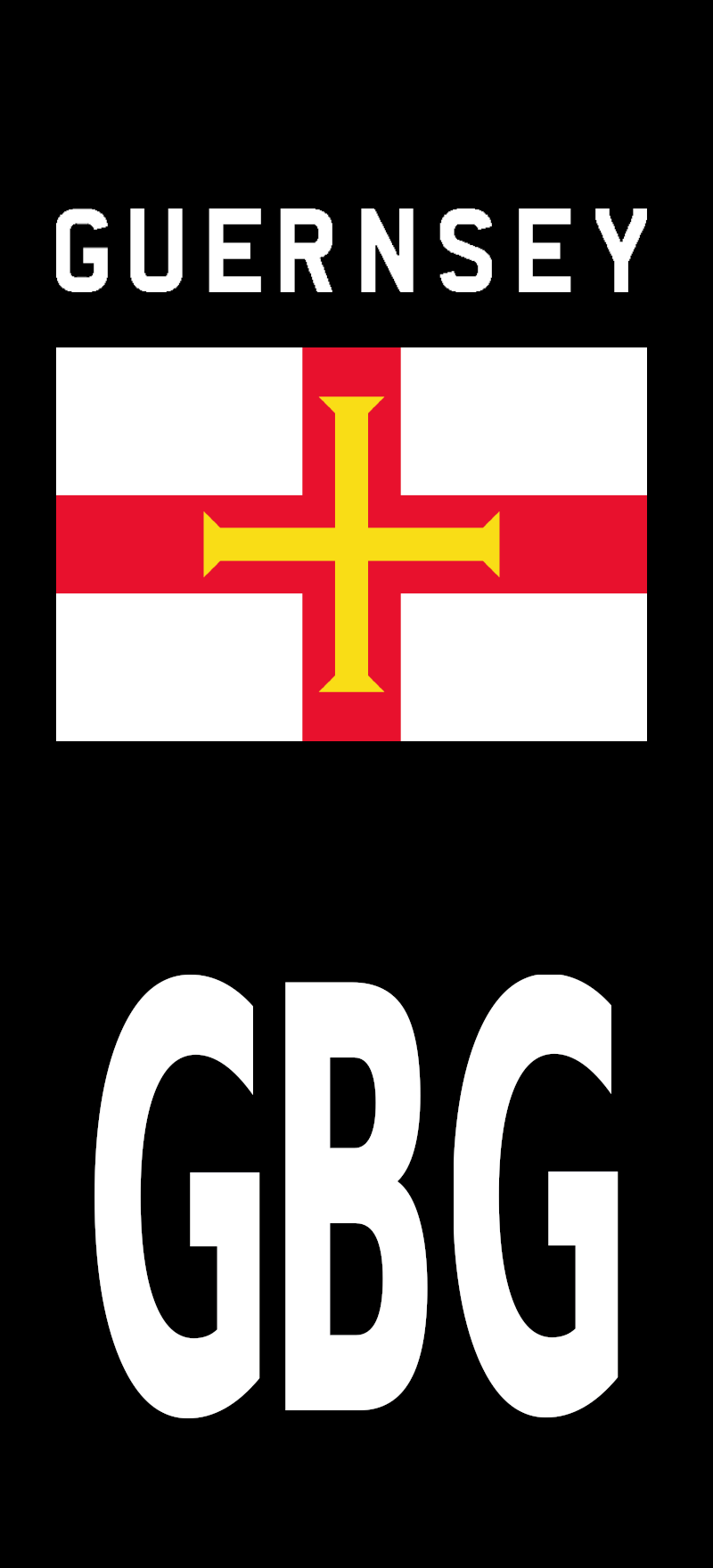
The Guernsey (GBG) identifier

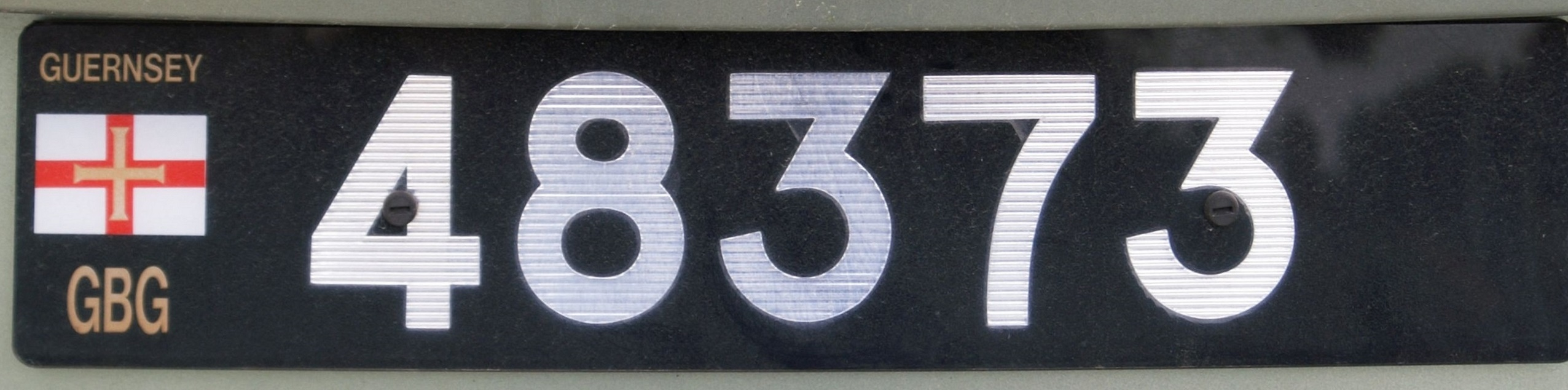
A Guernsey plate displaying the GBG country code

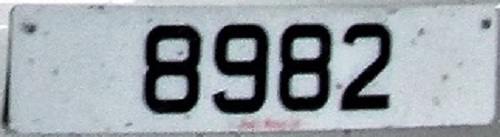
Guernsey front number plate without an identifier band

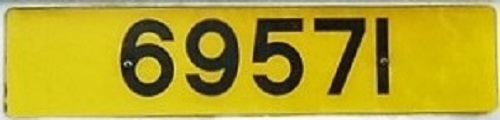
Guernsey rear number plate without an identifier band

== Other islands ==
Alderney
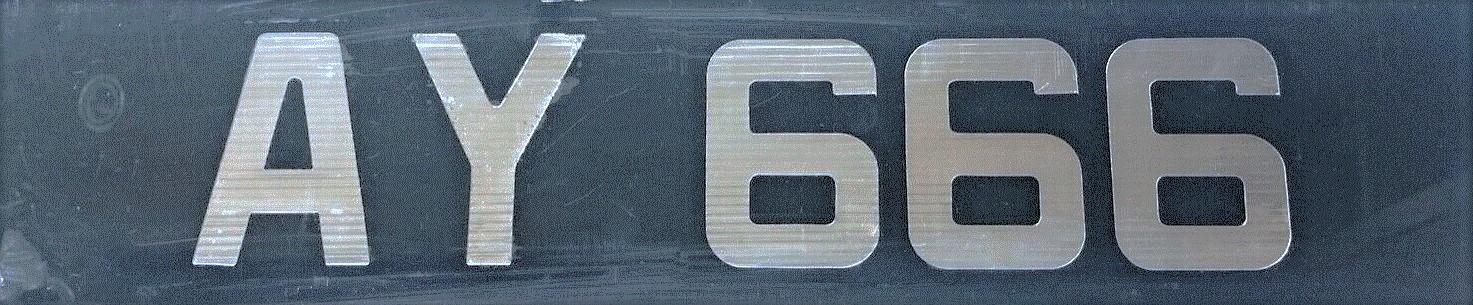

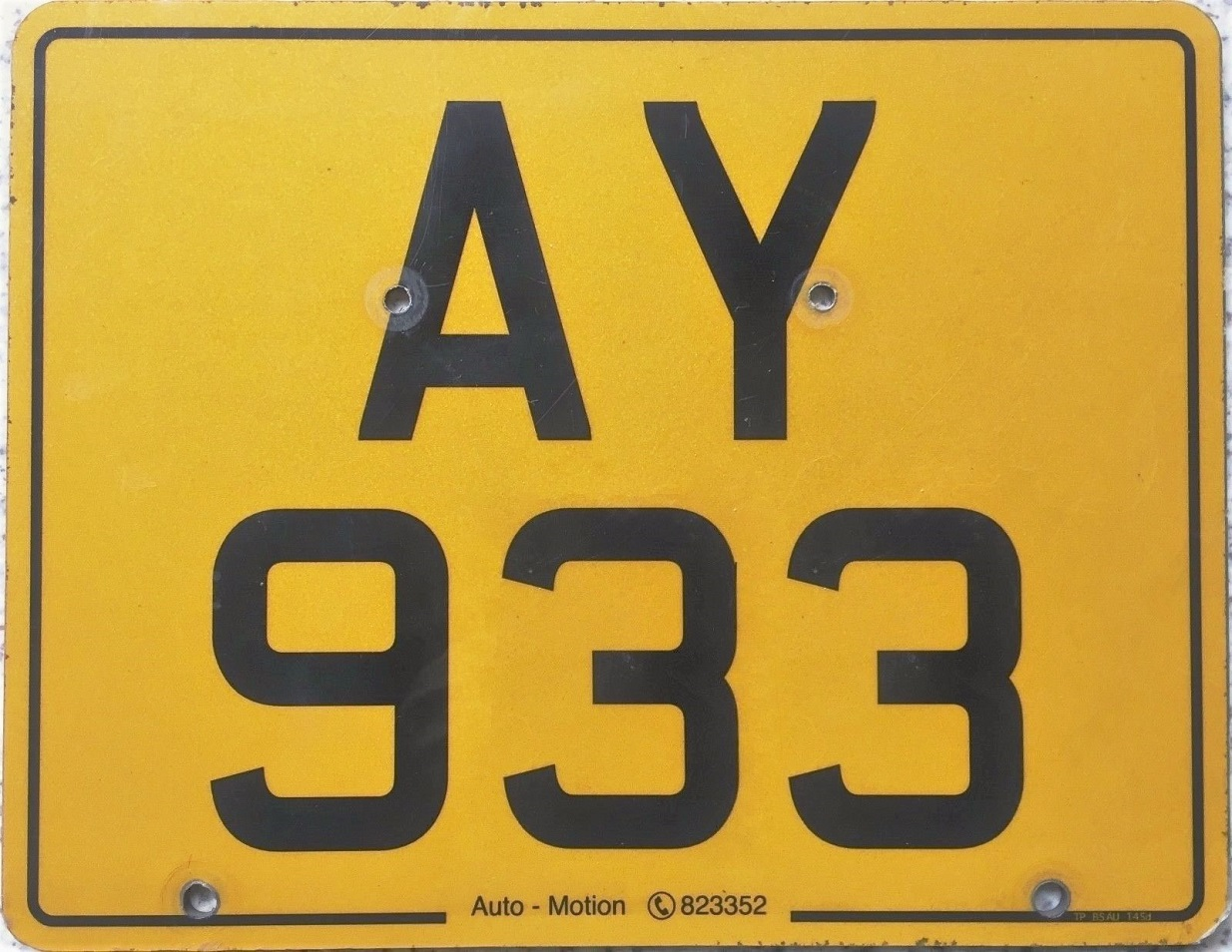
- Regular legal standard number plate from Alderney (top) and yellow back plate (bottom).
- Country: Alderney
- Country code: GBA

Current series
- Size: 520 mm × 110 mm 20.5 in × 4.3 in
- Serial format: Not standard
- Colour (front): Black on white
- Colour (rear): Black on yellow

Registration plates of Alderney are issued with the prefix 'AY' followed by a space and then one, two, three or four digits (as seen in the photo on the side). Residents or owners of property can register a vehicle which is primarily for circulation in Alderney can register their vehicle and receive a registration mark.

Alderney is identified as a jurisdiction in its own right in the 1926 Convention on Motor Traffic. Before the Second World War registration were issued at the Island Hall by the Island's Government, the States of Alderney; following the 1948 Agreement driver and vehicle licensing was delegated by the States of Alderney to the Guernsey Government as one of the "transferred services"; thus motor vehicle registrations are now issued by the Guernsey Government upon application to the General Office of the States of Alderney at the Island Hall in Alderney. The international vehicle registration code for Alderney is GBA.

Sark and Herm ban motor vehicles other than tractors from their roads.
