= Bagan Serai railway station =

Railway station in Bagan Serai, Kerian, Perak, Malaysia

Coordinates: 5°1′8″N 100°31′55″E

Bagan Serai

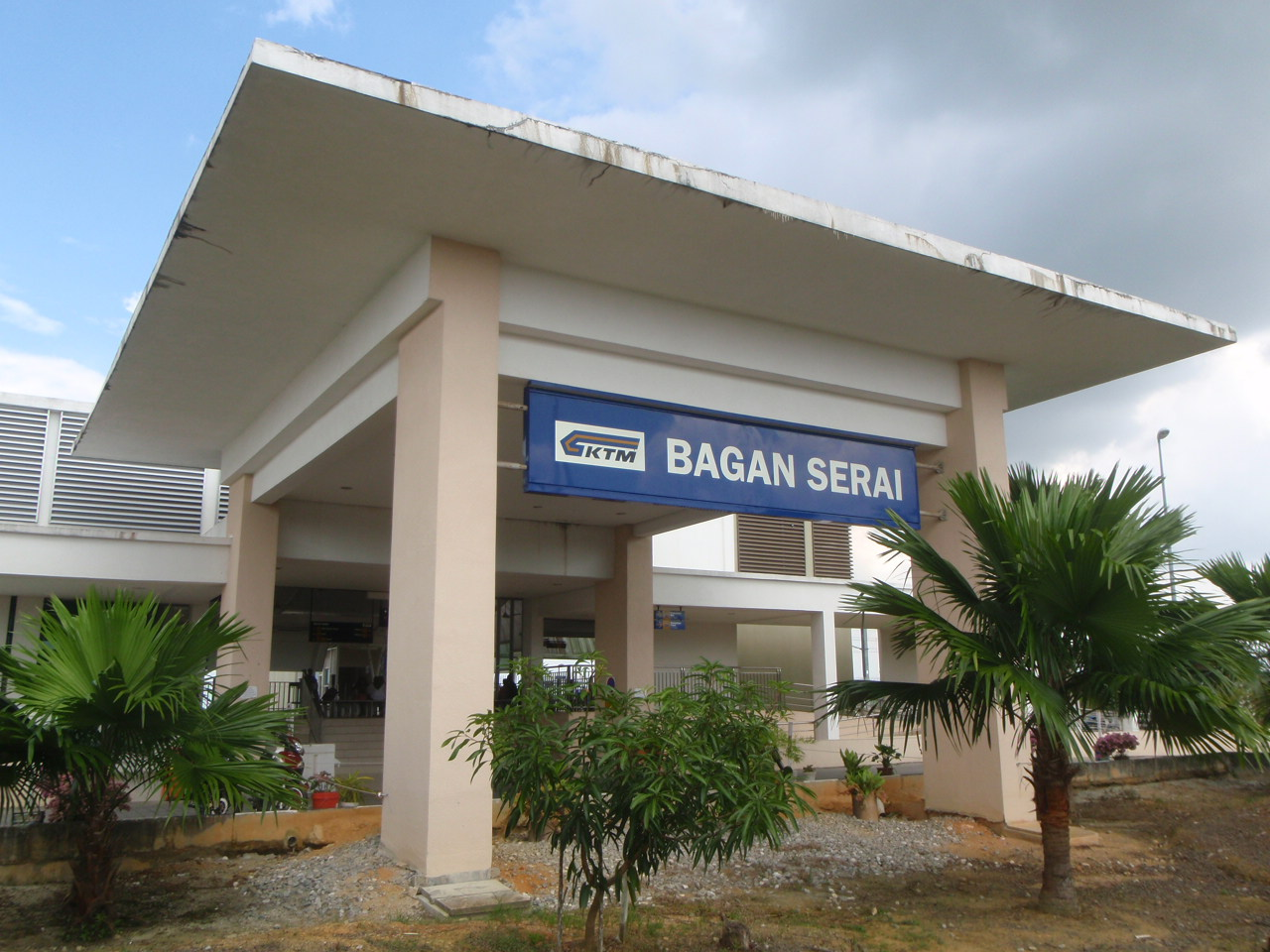

General information
- Other names: Malay: باݢن سراي (Jawi); Chinese: 峇眼色海; Tamil: பாகன் செராய்
- Location: Bagan Serai, Perak; Malaysia
- System: Inter-city rail and Commuter rail station
- Owner: Keretapi Tanah Melayu
- Lines: 1 KTM Komuter (KTM Komuter Northern Sector); ETS KTM ETS
- Platforms: 2 side platform
- Tracks: 2

Construction
- Parking: Available
- Accessible: Y

History
- Rebuilt: 2013
- Electrified: 2015

Services
Preceding station	KTM Komuter	Following station
Parit Buntar towards Butterworth	Ipoh–Butterworth Line	Kamunting towards Ipoh
Preceding station	ETS	Following station
Parit Buntar towards Padang Besar	Padang Besar–JB Sentral (Gold)	Taiping towards JB Sentral
Parit Buntar towards Butterworth	Butterworth–Segamat (Gold)	Taiping towards Segamat
Track layout
Location

The Bagan Serai railway station is a Malaysian train station located at and named after the town of Bagan Serai, Perak. It was later relocated and upgraded to an elevated station as part of the double-tracking and electrification project of the railway.

Bagan Serai is situated in the Kerian agricultural region, known for its paddy cultivation and rice production. The station provides a rail connection for residents, students, workers and visitors to make travelling easier to Bagan Serai or neighbouring towns.

== Platforms, facilities and services ==
Bagan Serai has two side platforms that serves KTM Komuter and KTM ETS Gold routes.
