= Taiping railway station =

Railway station in Taiping, Malaysia

Coordinates: 4°51′6″N 100°43′52″E

Taiping

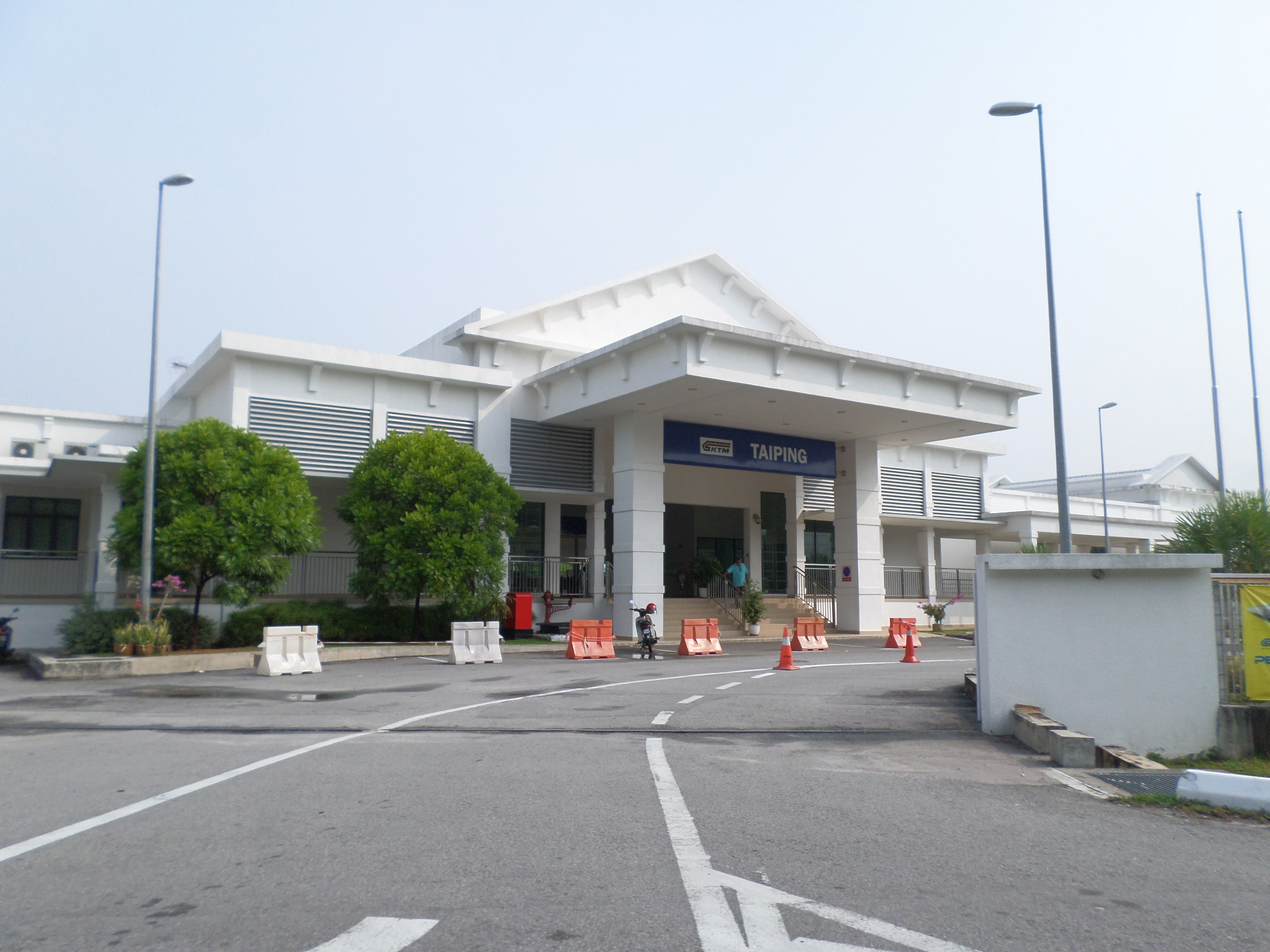

General information
- Other names: Malay: تايڤيڠ (Jawi); Chinese: 太平; Tamil: தைப்பிங்
- Location: Taiping, Perak, Malaysia.
- Owner: Railway Assets Corporation
- Operator: Keretapi Tanah Melayu
- Line: West Coast Line
- Platforms: 2 side platform
- Tracks: 2

Construction
- Parking: Available, free.
- Accessible: Y

History
- Opened: 1885
- Rebuilt: Between 1890s-1900s (1st rebuild); October 2013 (2nd rebuild)
- Electrified: 2015

Services
Preceding station	KTM Komuter	Following station
Kamunting towards Butterworth	Ipoh–Butterworth Line	Padang Rengas towards Ipoh
Preceding station	ETS	Following station
Sungai Petani towards Padang Besar	KL Sentral–Padang Besar (Express)	Ipoh towards KL Sentral
Bukit Mertajam towards Butterworth	KL Sentral–Butterworth (Express)	Ipoh towards KL Sentral
Parit Buntar towards Padang Besar	KL Sentral–Padang Besar (Platinum)	Kuala Kangsar towards KL Sentral
Parit Buntar towards Butterworth	KL Sentral–Butterworth (Platinum)	Kuala Kangsar towards KL Sentral
Parit Buntar towards Padang Besar	Padang Besar–JB Sentral (Platinum)	Kuala Kangsar towards JB Sentral
Parit Buntar towards Butterworth	Butterworth–JB Sentral (Platinum)	Kuala Kangsar towards JB Sentral
Bagan Serai towards Padang Besar	Padang Besar–JB Sentral (Gold)	Kuala Kangsar towards JB Sentral
Bagan Serai towards Butterworth	Butterworth–Segamat (Gold)	Kuala Kangsar towards Segamat
Track layout
Location

The Taiping railway station is a Malaysian train station located at and named after the town of Taiping, Perak.

Malaysia's first railway station was situated in Taiping and was opened in 1885 when the Taiping-Port Weld Railway Line, Malaysia's first, was opened. The current modern station is the third railway station to be built in Taiping. It was built as part of the Ipoh-Padang Besar Electrification and Double-Tracking Project which was completed in 2014.

The station is on the KTM West Coast Line and is a stop for both the KTM ETS inter-city services since 10 July 2015 and the KTM Komuter Northern Sector's Ipoh-Butterworth Line.

== Location and locality ==
Taiping station is situated on Jalan Stesen, close to the town centre. Given its status as a historical town, Taiping is home to some popular attractions such as Taiping Lake Gardens and Zoo Taiping.

Taiping station is considered the central station for the entire Larut, Matang and Selama District, which includes the towns of Kamunting, Batu Kurau, Changkat Jering, Kuala Sepetang, and Trong. Kamunting itself its own station which serves the northern part of the district, but is only served by KTM Komuter services.

== History ==
Old station building situated next to the new station

The first Taiping railway station was opened in 1885 and is situated where the King Edward VII Primary School now stands. The station was officiated by Sir Hugh Low. The station was the eastern terminus of the Taiping-Port Weld Railway Line, Malaysia's first railway line. The tracks of the line no longer exist as they were dismantled in the 1980s.

The second station, which replaced the original Taiping railway station, was the relocated to the Jalan Stesen site between the 1890s to early 1900s. This station was in operation until it was replaced by a new station that was built as part of the Ipoh-Padang Besar Electrification and Double-Tracking Project. The old station is still standing and is being preserved.

The new station, which is situated to the northeast of the second station, began operations on 27 February 2014. The KTM ETS's ETS Transit began serving this station when services commenced on 10 July 2015. A day later on 11 July 2015, ETS Ekspres trains began serving this station. These services have since been replaced by newer services with various destinations on the West Coast Line.
