= Parit Buntar railway station =

Town in Kerian, Perak, Malaysia

Coordinates: 5°7′43″N 100°29′12″E

Parit Buntar

General information
- Other names: Malay: ڤاريت بونتر (Jawi); Chinese: 巴里文打; Tamil: பாரிட் புந்தார்
- Location: Parit Buntar; Perak; Malaysia
- Owner: Railway Assets Corporation
- Operator: Keretapi Tanah Melayu
- Line: West Coast Line
- Platforms: 2
- Tracks: 2

Construction
- Parking: Available, free.
- Accessible: Y

History
- Electrified: 2015

Services
Preceding station	KTM Komuter	Following station
Nibong Tebal towards Butterworth	Ipoh–Butterworth Line	Bagan Serai towards Ipoh
Preceding station	ETS	Following station
Tasek Gelugor towards Padang Besar	KL Sentral–Padang Besar (Platinum)	Taiping towards KL Sentral
Bukit Mertajam towards Butterworth	KL Sentral–Butterworth (Platinum)	Taiping towards KL Sentral
Tasek Gelugor towards Padang Besar	Padang Besar–JB Sentral (Platinum)	Taiping towards JB Sentral
Bukit Mertajam towards Butterworth	Butterworth–JB Sentral (Platinum)	Taiping towards JB Sentral
Nibong Tebal towards Padang Besar	Padang Besar–JB Sentral (Gold)	Bagan Serai towards JB Sentral
Nibong Tebal towards Butterworth	Butterworth–Segamat (Gold)	Bagan Serai towards Segamat
Track layout
Location

The Parit Buntar railway station is a Malaysian train station located at and named after the town of Parit Buntar, Perak.

== Location and locality ==
The station is located at the heart of the town of Parit Buntar, a town in Perak which borders Bandar Baharu in Kedah and Nibong Tebal in Penang. Other nearby towns are Tanjung Piandang and Bagan Serai.

The station is served by both KTM ETS services and the KTM Komuter Northern Sector's Ipoh-Butterworth Line.

While Nibong Tebal and Bagan Serai both have their own railway stations with regular ETS Gold and Komuter services, Parit Buntar is served by the additional ETS Platinum service which sees more inter-city trains stop at the station. Therefore, the station is a preferred choice for residents of the nearby towns especially students of Universiti Sains Malaysia's (USM) engineering campus and the MRSM Transkrian campus.
