= Padang Rengas =

Town in Kuala Kangsar District, Perak, Malaysia

Coordinates: 4°46′N 100°51′E

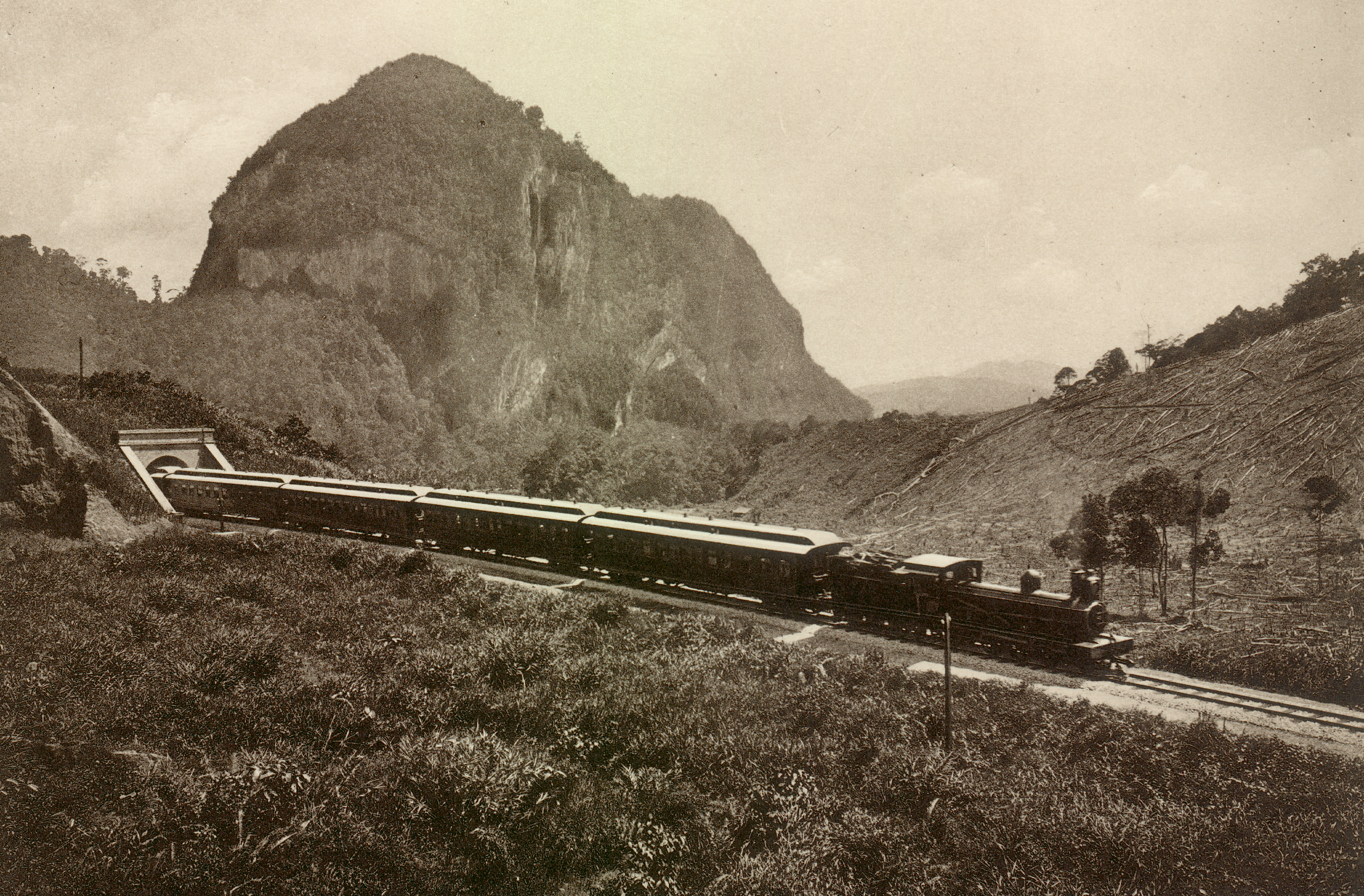
Train at the pass of Padang Rengas in 1910

Padang Rengas in Kuala Kangsar District

Padang Rengas (Jawi: ڤادڠ رڠاس; Chinese: 硝山) is a small town in Kuala Kangsar District, Perak, Malaysia.

It has a police station, railway station, rural health centre, market and Schools ~ SJK(C) Khiu Min, SK Tun Dr. Ismail, SK Perempuan & SMK Tun Perak, including a Technical-based education school. Padang Rengas has a major cement manufacturing complex and surrounded by rubber estates.

A site of interest is Gunung Pondok, a large limestone hill that is being actively quarried by YTL.

== Transportation ==
- Padang Rengas railway station. It is served by the KTM ETS Gold service and KTM Komuter. The station happens to be the former terminus of the 1 line from Padang Rengas to Butterworth station. The KTM Komuter line has since been extended to Ipoh on September 16, 2023. ETS Platinum services do not stop at this station so passengers would have to go to Kuala Kangsar station which is the nearest to Padang Rengas.
