= Tasek Gelugor railway station =

Railway station in Penang, Malaysia

Coordinates: 5°28′56″N 100°29′52″E

Tasek Gelugor

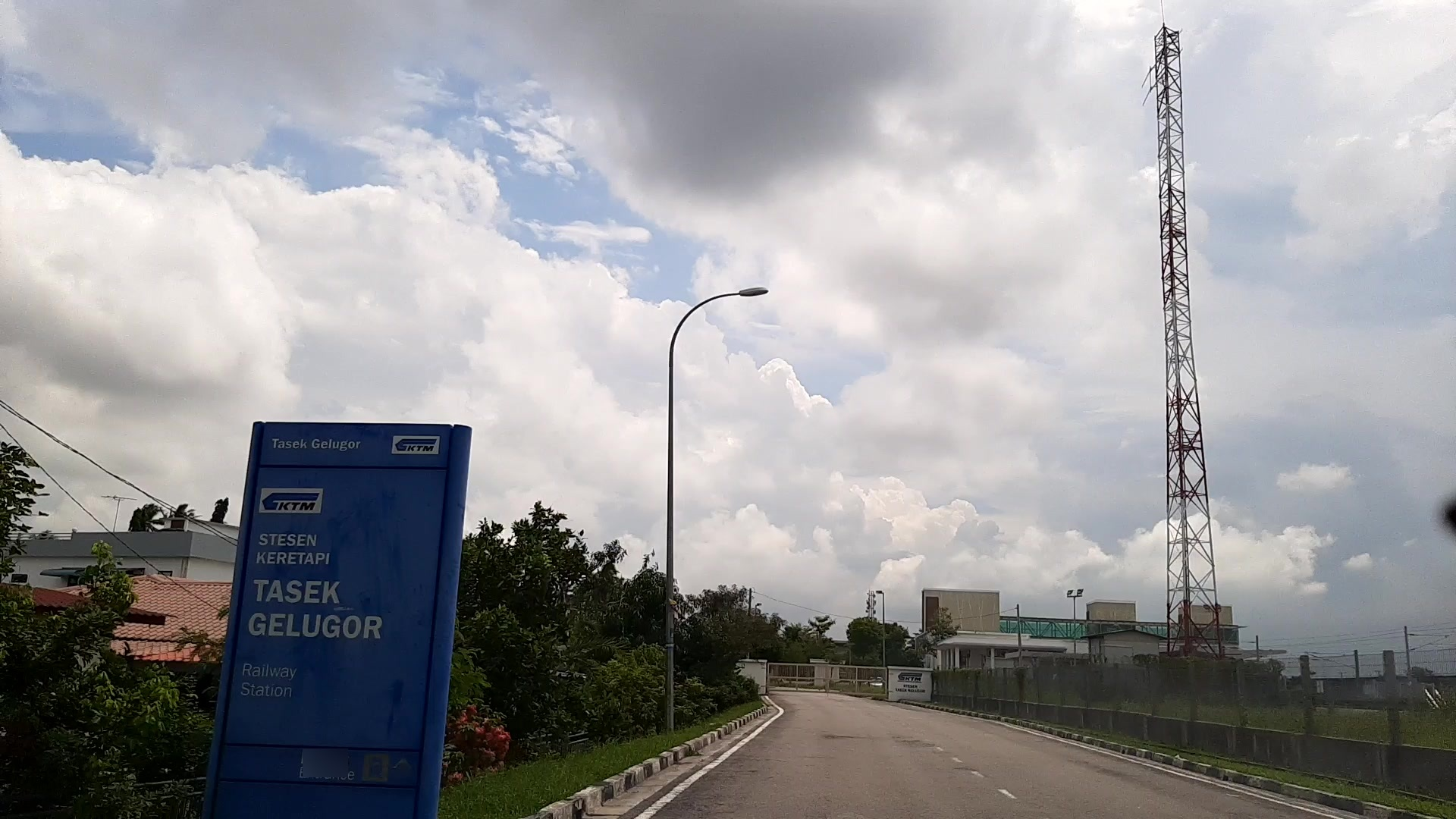

General information
- Other names: Malay: تاسيق ݢلوݢور (Jawi); Chinese: 打昔汝莪; Tamil: தாசேக் குளுகோர்
- Location: Tasek Gelugor; Penang; Malaysia
- Owner: Railway Assets Corporation
- Operator: Keretapi Tanah Melayu
- Line: West Coast Line
- Platforms: 2
- Tracks: 2

Construction
- Structure type: At-grade
- Parking: Available, free
- Accessible: Yes

History
- Electrified: 2015

Services
Preceding station	Keretapi Tanah Melayu (Komuter)	Following station
Sungai Petani towards Padang Besar	Padang Besar–Butterworth Line	Bukit Mertajam towards Butterworth
Preceding station	Keretapi Tanah Melayu (ETS)	Following station
Sungai Petani towards Padang Besar	KL Sentral–Padang Besar (Platinum)	Parit Buntar towards Kuala Lumpur Sentral
Sungai Petani towards Padang Besar	Padang Besar–JB Sentral (Platinum)	Parit Buntar towards Johor Bahru Sentral
Sungai Petani towards Padang Besar	Padang Besar–JB Sentral (Gold)	Nibong Tebal towards Johor Bahru Sentral
Location

The Tasek Gelugor railway station is a Malaysian train station located at and named after the town of Tasek Gelugor, Penang.
