= Nibong Tebal railway station =

Railway station in Nibong Tebal, Malaysia

Coordinates: 5°10′11″N 100°28′46″E

Nibong Tebal

General information
- Other names: Malay: نيبوڠ تبل (Jawi); Chinese: 高渊; Tamil: நிபோங் திபால்
- Location: Nibong Tebal, Pulau Pinang, Malaysia.
- System: Inter-city rail and Commuter rail station
- Owner: Keretapi Tanah Melayu
- Lines: 1 KTM Komuter (KTM Komuter Northern Sector); ETS (Electric Train Service)
- Platforms: 2
- Tracks: 2

Construction
- Parking: Available, free.
- Accessible: Y

History
- Opened: 1 September 1900
- Electrified: 2015

Services
| Preceding station | KTM Komuter | Following station |
|---|---|---|
| Simpang Ampat towards Butterworth | Ipoh–Butterworth Line | Parit Buntar towards Ipoh |
| Preceding station | ETS | Following station |
| Tasek Gelugor towards Padang Besar | Padang Besar–JB Sentral (Gold) | Parit Buntar towards JB Sentral |
| Bukit Mertajam towards Butterworth | Butterworth–Segamat (Gold) | Parit Buntar towards Segamat |
Track layout
Location

The Nibong Tebal railway station is a Malaysian railway station located at and named after the town of Nibong Tebal, Pulau Pinang. The old railway station in Nibong Tebal was demolished on 26 January 2010 for undergoing renovations due to electrification and double tracking of the KTM rail line, which the old 10m iron railway bridge across the Krian River was also demolished and replaced with a new bridge.
