= Bukit Mertajam railway station =

Railway station in Malaysia

Coordinates: 5°21′40″N 100°27′39″E

Bukit Mertajam

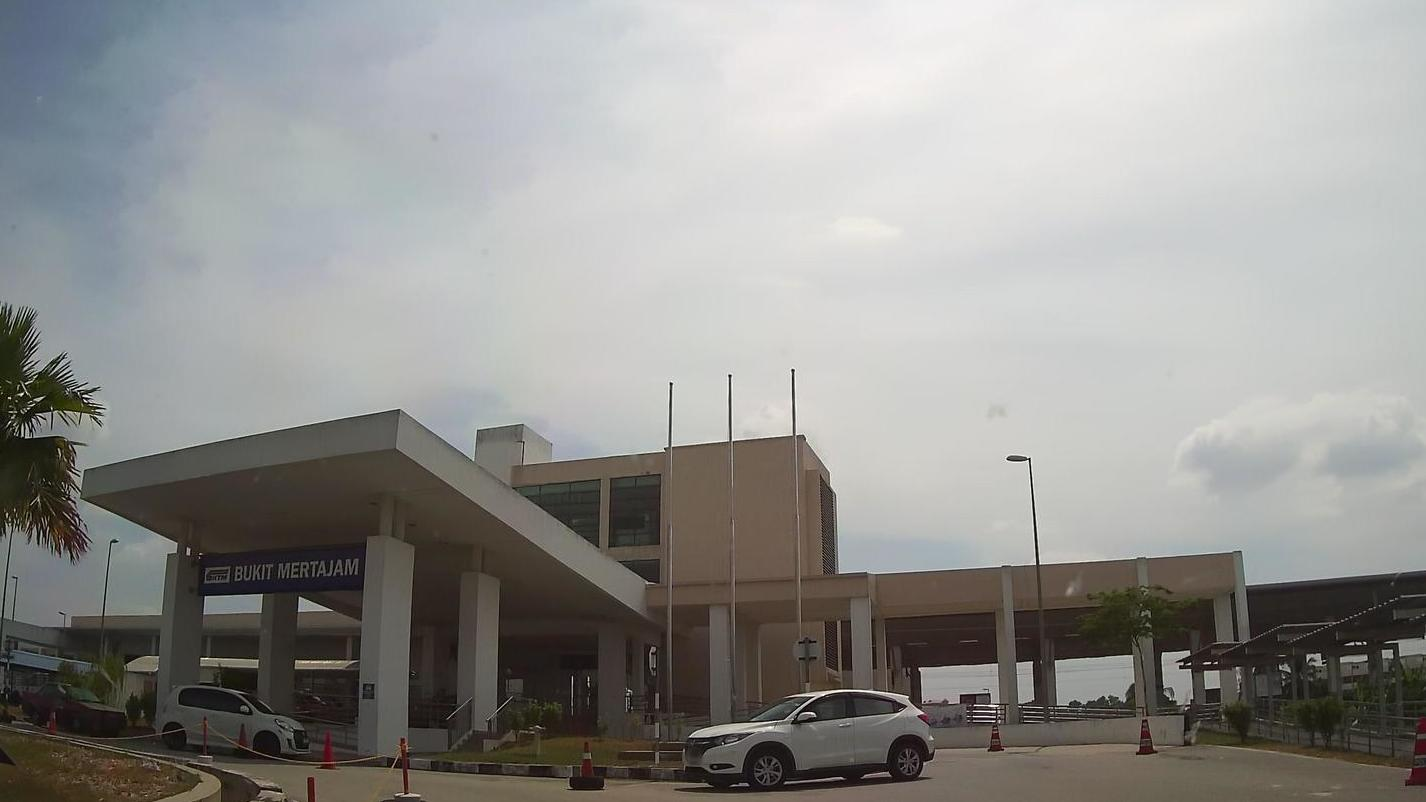
- Exterior view of the new Bukit Mertajam Railway Station

General information
- Other names: Malay: بوکيت مرتاجم (Jawi); Chinese: 大山脚; Tamil: புக்கிட் மெர்தாஜாம்
- Location: Bukit Mertajam; Penang; Malaysia
- Owner: Railway Assets Corporation
- Operator: Keretapi Tanah Melayu
- Line: West Coast Line (Butterworth branch)
- Platforms: 2 island platform
- Tracks: 5

Construction
- Parking: Available, free
- Accessible: Y

History
- Electrified: 2015

Services
| Preceding station | KTM Komuter | Following station |
|---|---|---|
| Bukit Tengah towards Butterworth | Ipoh–Butterworth Line | Simpang Ampat towards Ipoh |
| Tasek Gelugor towards Padang Besar | Padang Besar–Butterworth Line | Bukit Tengah towards Butterworth |
| Preceding station | ETS | Following station |
| Butterworth Terminus | KL Sentral–Butterworth (Express) | Taiping towards KL Sentral |
| Butterworth Terminus | KL Sentral–Butterworth (Platinum) | Parit Buntar towards KL Sentral |
| Butterworth Terminus | Butterworth–JB Sentral (Platinum) | Parit Buntar towards JB Sentral |
| Butterworth Terminus | Butterworth–Segamat (Gold) | Nibong Tebal towards Segamat |
Location

The Bukit Mertajam railway station is a Malaysian railway station located in Bukit Mertajam in the Central Seberang Perai District of the state of Penang.

== Location and locality ==
The station is located in the town of Bukit Mertajam, with access available from the sides of Jalan Permatang Rawa (Route P12) or Jalan Padang Lalang (Route P18). As the station is close to the old town centre, major landmarks of the town can be accessible from here. The station is also close to the commercial area of Bandar Perda.

The station not only serves Bukit Mertajam, but also the town of Kulim, Kedah adjacent Bukit Mertajam along the Penang-Kedah state border.

== Train services ==
The station is served by electric train services of Keretapi Tanah Melayu (KTM), mainly the KTM Komuter Northern Sector services on the Butterworth-Ipoh Line and Padang Besar-Butterworth Line, and also KTM ETS inter-city trains.

The station is one of three stations where both KTM Komuter Northern Sector lines overlap in Penang, hence making transfers possible between these two lines, and the preferred interchange station as it is the first station where both lines overlap. Prior to the extension to Butterworth, the station was the northern terminus of the Padang Rengas Komuter Line (now Butterworth-Ipoh Line).

The station was initially served by KTM Intercity services. Upon completion of the double tracking and electrification of the railway lines to Padang Besar and Butterworth, KTM Intercity services were entirely replaced by ETS and subsequently Komuter services
