= Bukit Tengah railway station =

Railway station in Bukit Tengah, Malaysia

Coordinates: 5.3645°N 100.4215°E

Bukit Tengah

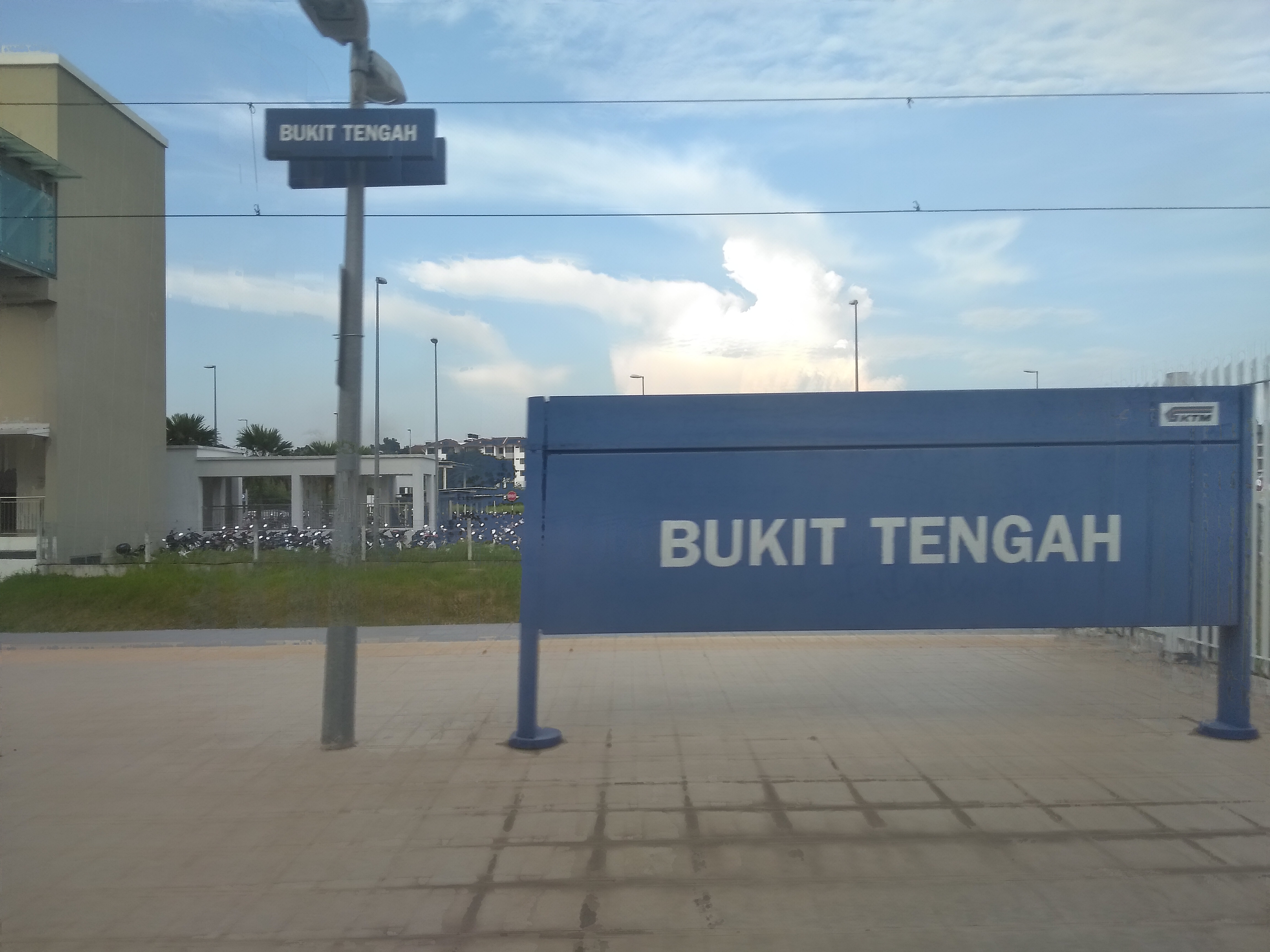

General information
- Other names: Malay: بوکيت تڠه (Jawi); Chinese: 武吉丁雅; Tamil: புக்கிட் தெங்கா
- Location: Bukit Tengah, Penang, Malaysia.
- System: | Commuter rail station
- Owner: Keretapi Tanah Melayu
- Line: Butterworth Branch
- Platforms: 2 island platform
- Tracks: 5

Construction
- Parking: Available, free.
- Accessible: Y

History
- Electrified: 2015

Services
Preceding station	Keretapi Tanah Melayu (Komuter)	Following station
Butterworth Terminus	Ipoh–Butterworth Line	Bukit Mertajam towards Ipoh
Bukit Mertajam towards Padang Besar	Padang Besar–Butterworth Line	Butterworth Terminus
Location

The Bukit Tengah station (Malay: Stesen Keretapi Bukit Tengah) is a Malaysian railway station named after the town of Bukit Tengah, Penang. It is located beside the Bukit Tengah railway depot.
