= Bukit Ketri railway station =

Railway station in Perlis, Malaysia

Coordinates: 6.5236°N 100.2572°E

Bukit Ketri

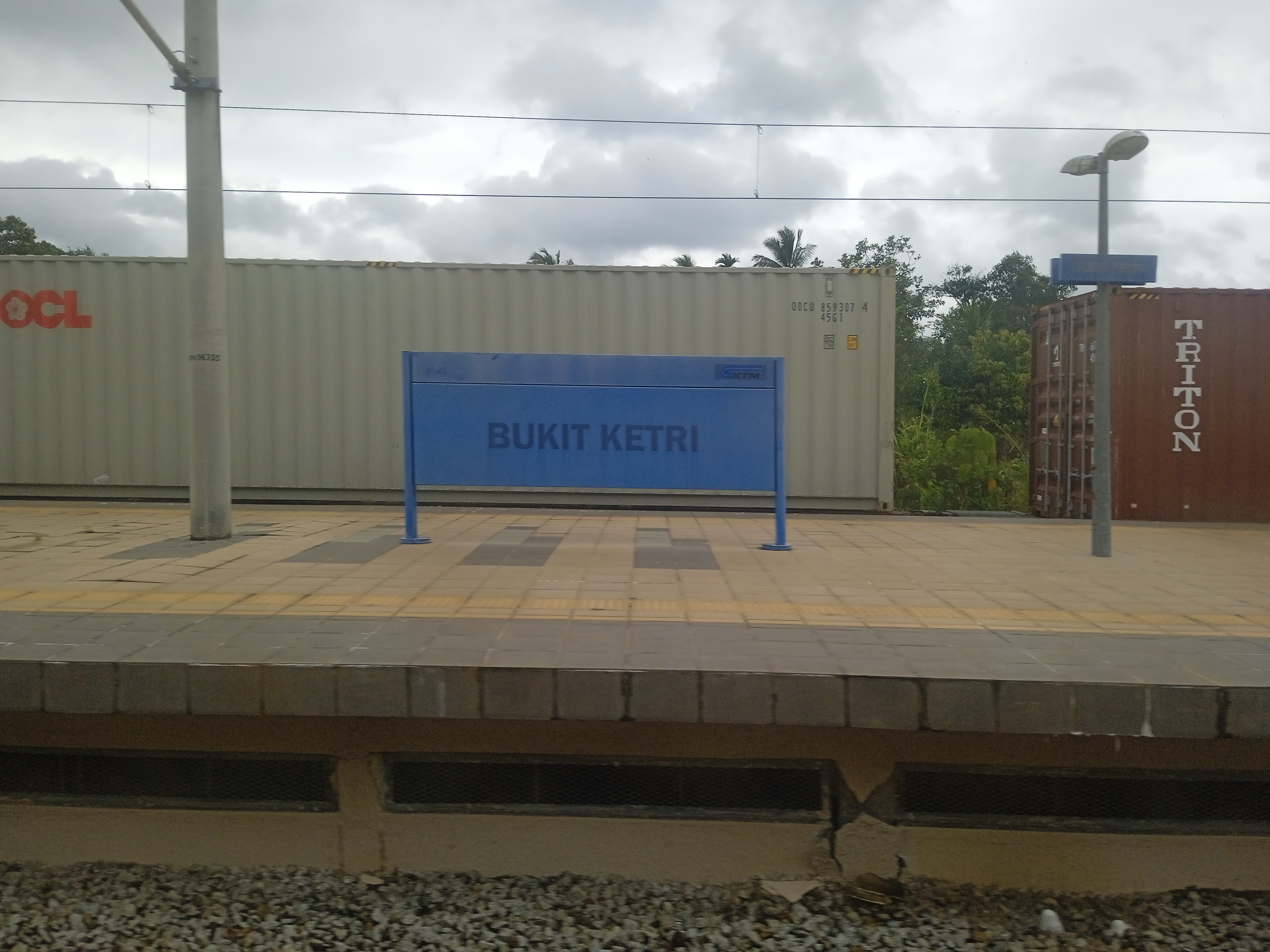
- Platform at Bukit Ketri station

General information
- Other names: Malay: بوکيت کيتري (Jawi); Chinese: 武吉吉德里; Tamil: புக்கிட் கேத்ரி
- Location: Bukit Ketri, Perlis; Malaysia
- System: | Commuter rail station
- Owner: Keretapi Tanah Melayu
- Line: West Coast Line
- Platforms: 2 side platform
- Tracks: 2
- Connections: F102 (Kangar - Kilang Gula)

Construction
- Structure type: At-grade
- Parking: Available
- Accessible: Yes

History
- Opened: 15 October 1917
- Rebuilt: 2015
- Electrified: 25 kV AC, 50 Hz

Services
Preceding station	Keretapi Tanah Melayu (Komuter)	Following station
Padang Besar Terminus	Padang Besar–Butterworth Line	Arau towards Butterworth
Location

The Bukit Ketri railway station is a Malaysian railway station of the West Coast Line located at Bukti Ketri, Perlis. It is served by the train route No. 2 (Butterworth–Padang Besar) under KTM Komuter Northern Sector.

== Location and locality ==
Bukit Ketri station is specifically located in Bukit Ketri, Perlis, Malaysia and is near to a few major places in Perlis like Chuping and Beseri. Its distance from the state capital, Kangar is only 15 kilometres and there's a bus connection heading to the town that make a stop here.
