= Simpang Ampat railway station =

Railway station in Simpang Ampat, Penang, Malaysia

Simpang Ampat

General information
- Other names: Malay: سيمڤڠ امڤت (Jawi); Chinese: 新邦安拔; Tamil: சிம்பாங் அம்பாட்
- Location: Simpang Ampat, Penang, Malaysia
- Coordinates: 5.2860°N 100.4809°E
- System: | Commuter rail station
- Owner: Keretapi Tanah Melayu
- Line: 1 KTM Komuter (KTM Komuter Northern Sector)
- Platforms: 2
- Tracks: 2

Construction
- Parking: Available, free
- Accessible: Y

History
- Electrified: 2015

Services
Preceding station	Keretapi Tanah Melayu (Komuter)	Following station
Bukit Mertajam towards Butterworth	Ipoh–Butterworth Line	Nibong Tebal towards Ipoh
Location

The Simpang Ampat railway station is a railway station located at Simpang Ampat, Penang, Malaysia.
