= Padang Rengas railway station =

Railway station in Padang Rengas, Malaysia

Padang Rengas

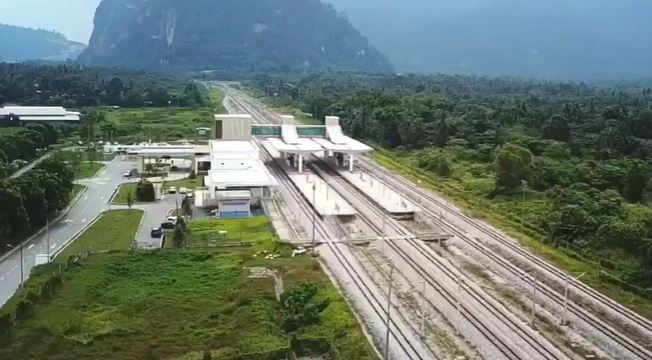

General information
- Other names: Malay: ڤادڠ رڠس (Jawi); Chinese: 硝山; Tamil: பாடாங் ரெங்காஸ்
- Location: Padang Rengas, Perak, Malaysia.
- System: Commuter rail station
- Owner: Keretapi Tanah Melayu
- Line: 1 KTM Komuter (KTM Komuter Northern Sector)
- Platforms: 2 island platform
- Tracks: 4

Construction
- Parking: Available, free.
- Accessible: Y

History
- Electrified: 2015

Services
Preceding station	KTM Komuter	Following station
Taiping towards Butterworth	Ipoh–Butterworth Line	Kuala Kangsar towards Ipoh
Location

The Padang Rengas railway station is a Malaysian train station located at and named after the town of Padang Rengas, Perak. The station was the southern terminus for the KTM Komuter Padang Rengas Line, until the Komuter line was extended to Ipoh on 16 September 2023. Prior to 1 August 2024, the station was also served by KTM ETS trains.

== Location and locality ==
Padang Rengas is located near the Padang Rengas town at the northwest of the Kuala Kangsar district, and just ten kilometres to Kuala Kangsar town. The station is located after the southern end of Bukit Berapit tunnel.

Prior to the Komuter Northern Sector extension to Ipoh, this station attracted passengers as far as Kuala Kangsar, Sungai Siput and even Ipoh as it was the terminus for the commuter service at that time.
