= Kamunting railway station =

Railway station in Larut, Matang and Selama, Perak, Malaysia

Coordinates: 4.8959°N 100.7192°E

Kamunting

General information
- Other names: Malay: كامونتيڠ (Jawi); Chinese: 甘文丁; Tamil: கமுந்திங்
- Location: Kamunting, Perak, Malaysia.
- System: | Commuter rail station
- Owner: Keretapi Tanah Melayu
- Line: 1 KTM Komuter (KTM Komuter Northern Sector)
- Platforms: 2 island platform
- Tracks: 4

Construction
- Parking: Available, free.
- Accessible: Y

History
- Opened: 1890
- Rebuilt: Between 1900s-1910s (1st rebuild); October 2013 (2nd rebuild)
- Electrified: 2015

Services
Preceding station	Keretapi Tanah Melayu (Komuter)	Following station
Bagan Serai towards Butterworth	Ipoh–Butterworth Line	Taiping towards Ipoh
Location

The Kamunting railway station is a Malaysian train station located at and named after the town of Kamunting, Perak. Kamunting was also the southern terminus of the KTM Komuter Northern Sector before it was moved to Padang Rengas in July 2016 and subsequently Ipoh in 2023.
