= KTM Komuter Northern Sector =

Railway service in Malaysia

- 1 2
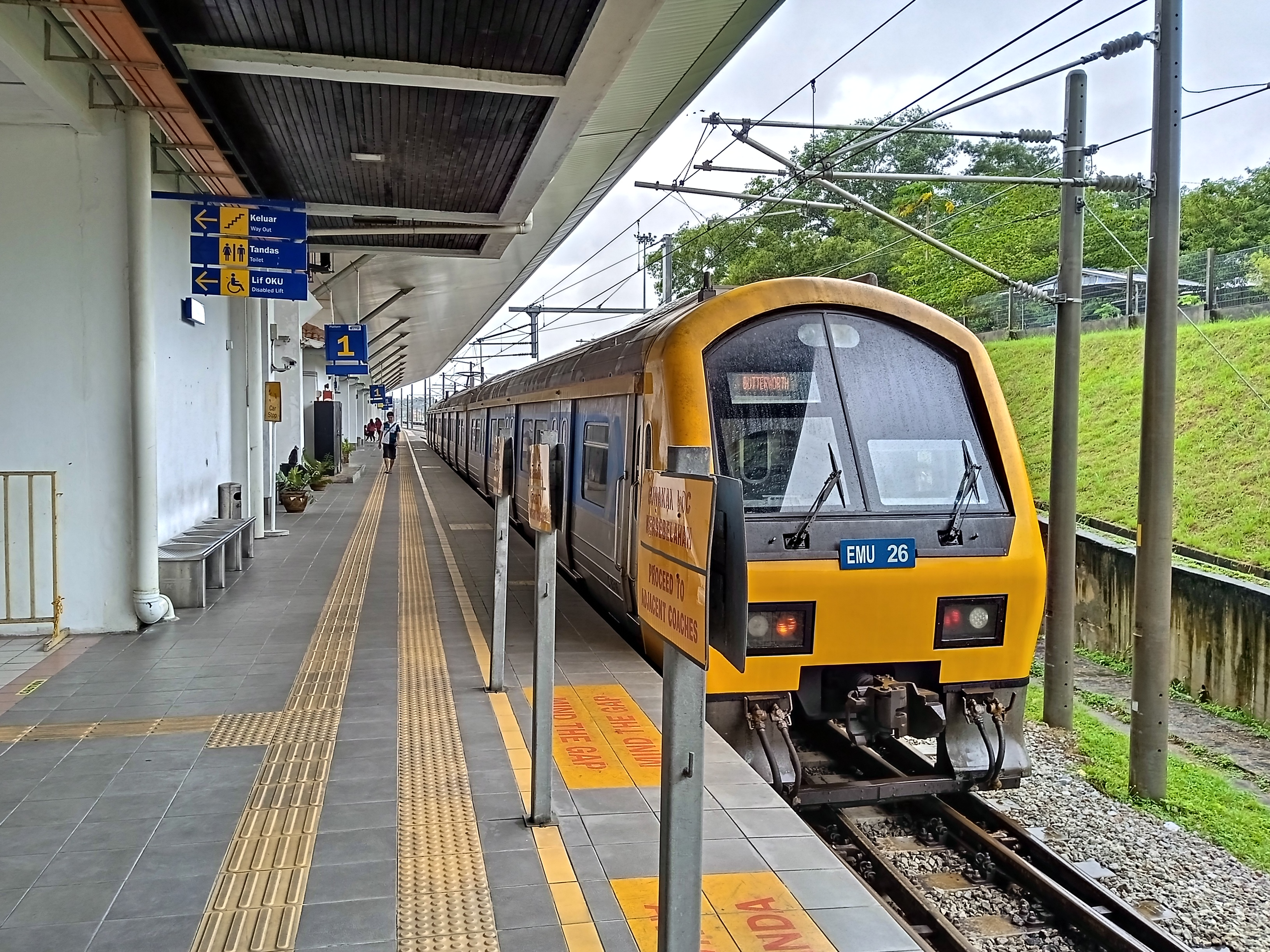
- KTM Class 83 at Padang Besar Railway Station

Overview
- Native name: KTM Komuter Utara
- Status: Operational
- Owner: Keretapi Tanah Melayu
- Locale: George Town Conurbation, Perak, Greater Kedah and Perlis
- Termini: Padang Besar Ipoh; Butterworth
- Stations: 23
- Website: www.ktmb.com.my

Service
- Type: Commuter rail
- System: KTM Komuter
- Services: 1 Ipoh–Butterworth; 2 Padang Besar–Butterworth
- Route number: 1 2
- Operator: Keretapi Tanah Melayu (Komuter Division)
- Depot: Bukit Tengah
- Rolling stock: KTM Class 81 3-car formation KTM Class 83 3-car formation KTM Class 84 3-car formation (future); KTM Class 92 6-car formation
- Daily ridership: 17,085 (Q2 2026)
- Ridership: 6.41 million (2025)

History
- Opened: 11 September 2015; 11 years ago

Technical
- Line length: Butterworth–Ipoh: 162 km (101 mi); Butterworth–Padang Besar: 169.8 km (105.5 mi)
- Track gauge: 1,000 mm (3 ft 3 3/8 in) metre gauge
- Electrification: 25 kV 50 Hz AC overhead catenary
- Operating speed: Up to 125 km/h (78 mph)

The KTM Komuter Northern Sector (Malay: KTM Komuter Utara) is one of the three KTM Komuter sectors run by Malaysian rail operator Keretapi Tanah Melayu (KTM). The service was introduced on 11 September 2015 following the completion of the Ipoh-Padang Besar Electrification and Double-Tracking Project in December 2014, which also saw the extension of ETS services to Padang Besar from Ipoh.

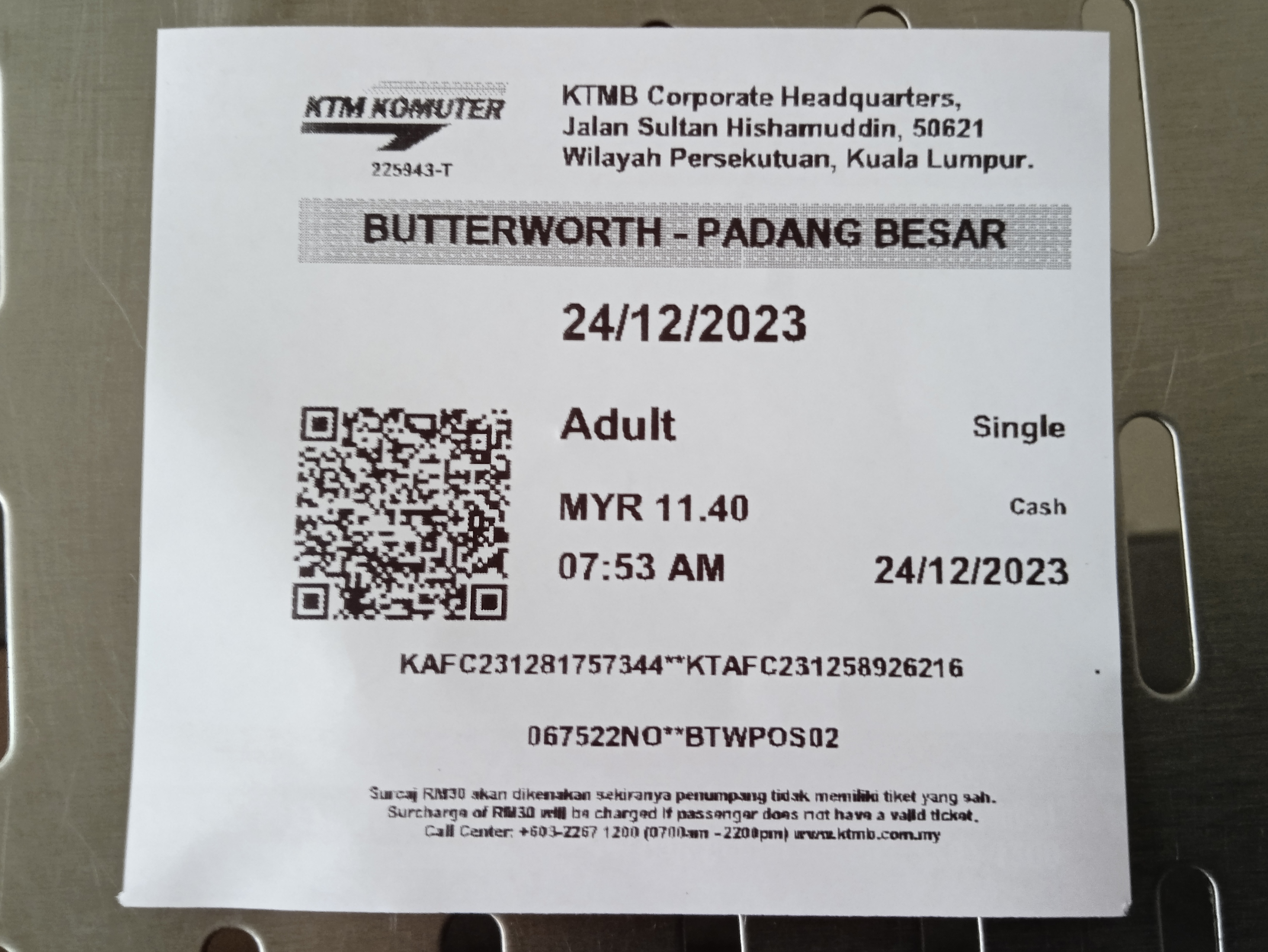
KTM Komuter Northern Sector physical ticket for journey from Butterworth station to Padang Besar station

Currently, the KTM Komuter Northern Sector consists of two routes, namely the Butterworth – Padang Besar route and the Ipoh – Butterworth route. The lines share tracks with KTM ETS services, though the Komuter services call at stations also not served by ETS.

== Lines, stations and rolling stock ==
The KTM Komuter Northern Section consists of two routes:

- 1 Ipoh–Butterworth Line
- 2 Padang Besar–Butterworth Line

Since November 2021, the Butterworth-Padang Rengas route replaced the Bukit Mertajam–Kamunting route. The Bukit Mertajam, Bukit Tengah and Butterworth stations are common stations between the two lines. On 16 September 2023, the Butterworth–Padang Rengas route was extended southwards to Ipoh.

⇄ = cross-platform interchange

| Station Name | Platform type | 2 | 1 | Interchange station/Notes |
| Padang Besar | 2 island | ● | | Northern terminus. Connects to Thailand's SRT Southern Line. ⇄ KTM ETS |
| Bukit Ketri | 2 island | ● | | |
| Arau | 2 island | ● | | ⇄ KTM ETS Access to Universiti Teknologi MARA's (UiTM) Arau Campus, Universiti Malaysia Perlis (UniMAP), Universiti Utara Malaysia (UUM), and the Perlis Matriculation College |
| Kodiang | 2 side | ● | | Access to Kedah Matriculation College |
| Anak Bukit | 2 side | ● | | ⇄ KTM ETS Access to Sultan Abdul Halim Airport within 5 to 8 minutes by taxi. |
| Alor Setar | 2 side | ● | | ⇄ KTM ETS |
| Kobah | 2 side | ● | | |
| Gurun | 2 island | ● | | ⇄ KTM ETS |
| Sungai Petani | 2 side | ● | | ⇄ KTM ETS Access to Universiti Teknologi MARA's (UiTM) Merbok Campus |
| Tasek Gelugor | 1 island 1 side | ● | | ⇄ KTM ETS Access to Penang Matriculation College |
| Bukit Mertajam | 2 island | ● | ● | Interchange station ⇄ KTM ETS |
| Bukit Tengah | 2 island | ● | ● | Interchange station |
| Butterworth | 2 island | ● | ● | Central terminus. Connecting station to MTL LRT Mutiara Line (future). Access to George Town by Penang Ferry Service. ⇄ KTM ETS |
| Bukit Tengah | 2 island | ● | ● | Interchange station |
| Bukit Mertajam | 2 island | ● | ● | Interchange station ⇄ KTM ETS |
| Simpang Ampat | 2 side | | ● | |
| Nibong Tebal | 2 side | | ● | ⇄ KTM ETS Access to Universiti Sains Malaysia Engineering Campus |
| Parit Buntar | 2 side | | ● | ⇄ KTM ETS |
| Bagan Serai | 2 side | | ● | ⇄ KTM ETS |
| Kamunting | 2 island | | ● | |
| Taiping | 2 side | | ● | ⇄ KTM ETS |
| Padang Rengas | 2 island | | ● | |
| Kuala Kangsar | 2 side | | ● | ⇄ KTM ETS |
| Sungai Siput | 2 island | | ● | ⇄ KTM ETS |
| Ipoh | 2 side | | ● | Southern terminus. ⇄ KTM ETS |

The train sets that are currently used for the Northern services are the KTM Class 83 as well as the KTM Class 92, the latter which is also used on the Central sector lines.

The service will receive 12 KTM Class 84 sets from CRRC Zhuzhou with the first set arrived in August 2026 and expected to begin operating in February 2027.

== Schedule ==
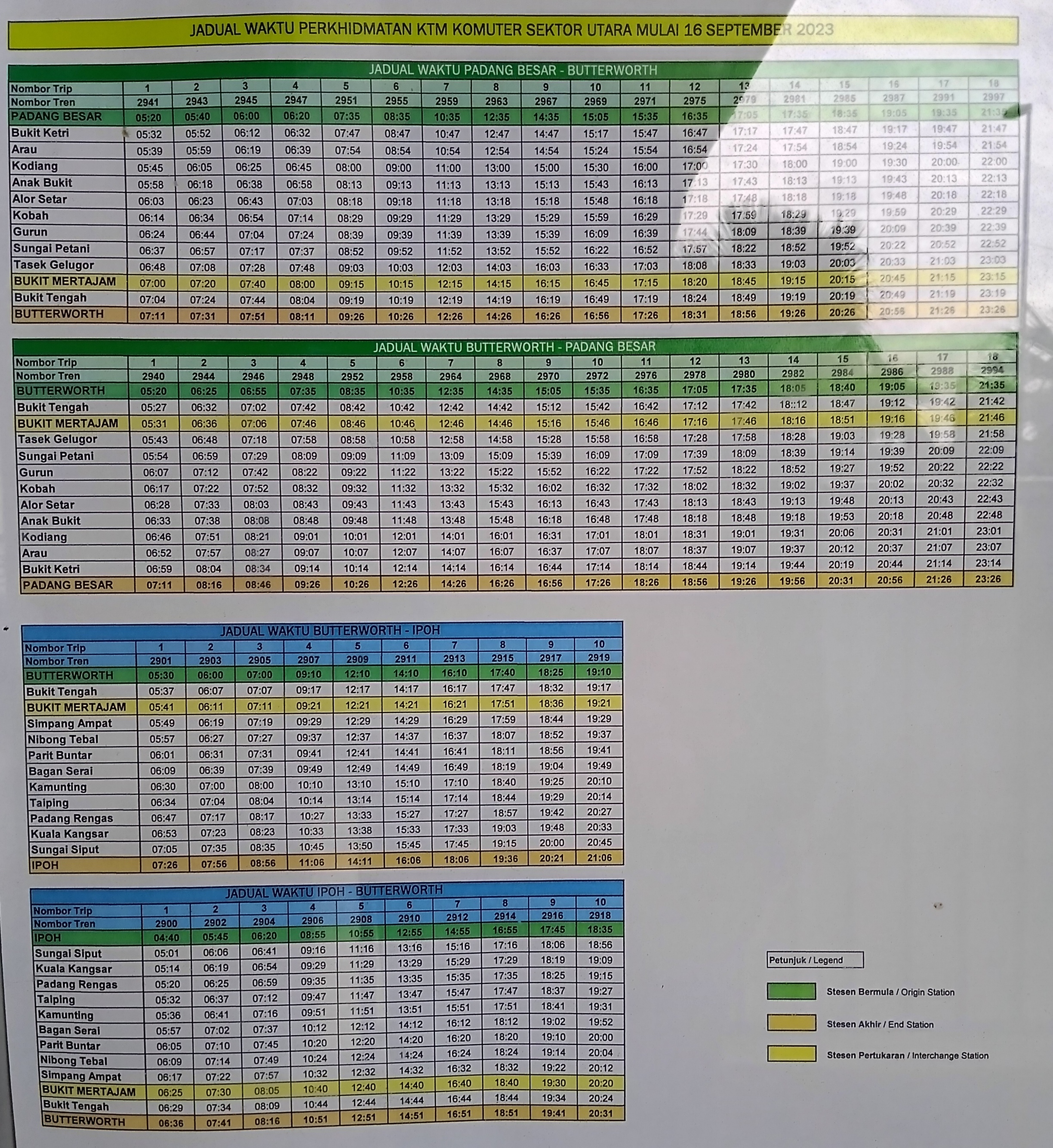
Schedule of KTM Komuter Northern Sector at Butterworth station

KTM Komuter Northern Sector has 2 routes/lines, in which they have their own schedule.

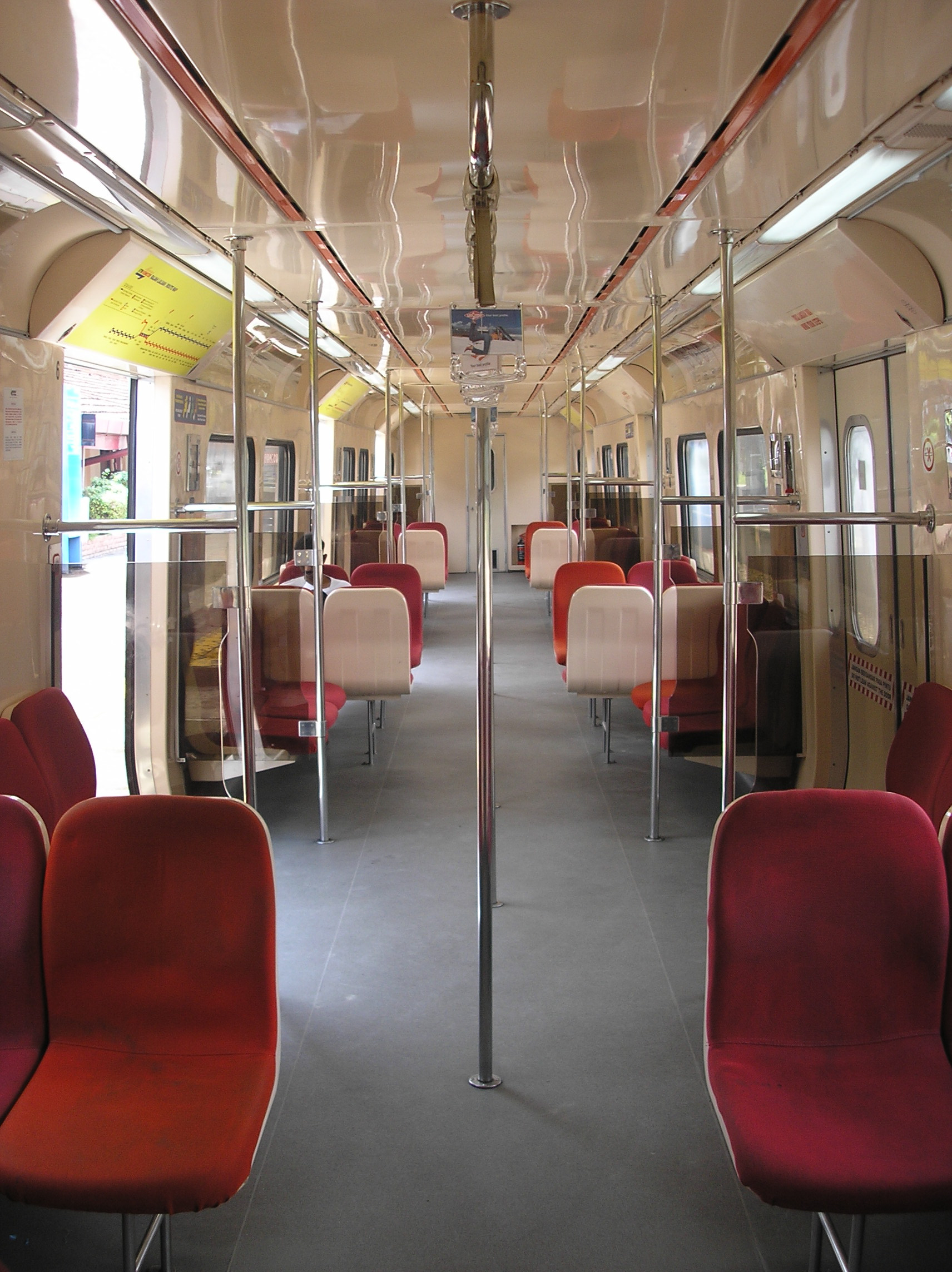
The (modified—with additional handle bars) interior of a Class 83 EMU train

== History ==
The KTM Komuter Northern Service was introduced on 11 September 2015. The initial service ran between Gurun in Kedah, Butterworth in Penang and Kamunting in Perak. On 1 January 2016, a service between Butterworth and Padang Besar in Perlis was introduced. With the introduction of KTM Komuter services on this section, two KTM ETS services that ran between these stations have ceased, reducing the number of ETS services between the stations to make way for the new KTM Komuter service.

On 17 January 2016, the original Gurun-Butterworth-Kamunting route was replaced with two separate routes: Butterworth-Gurun and Butterworth-Kamunting. These two lines together with the Butterworth-Padang Besar line operated until 1 July 2016, when the Butterworth-Gurun route was scrapped.

A further revamp of routes on 1 September 2016 saw the Butterworth-Kamunting line being modified, with the northern terminus moving from Butterworth to Bukit Mertajam, and the southern terminus being extended by two additional stations from Kamunting to include Taiping and ending at Padang Rengas.

From November 4, 2021, trains from Padang Rengas and Padang Besar now terminate at Butterworth, making Butterworth and Bukit Mertajam the shared interchange stations between both lines.

An extension of the Padang Rengas line to Kuala Kangsar, Sungai Siput and Ipoh began running on 16 September 2023.

== Ridership ==
KTM Komuter Northern Sector Ridership
| Year | Quarter | Ridership | Annual Ridership | Note |
|---|---|---|---|---|
| 2026 | Q4 | | 5,052,430 | |
| 2026 | Q3 | 1,768,381 | 5,052,430 | As of September 2026 |
| 2026 | Q2 | 1,714,809 | 5,052,430 | |
| 2026 | Q1 | 1,569,240 | 5,052,430 | |
| 2025 | Q4 | 1,692,425 | 6,417,047 | |
| 2025 | Q3 | 1,646,746 | 6,417,047 | |
| 2025 | Q2 | 1,636,408 | 6,417,047 | |
| 2025 | Q1 | 1,441,468 | 6,417,047 | |
| 2024 | Q4 | 1,531,451 | 5,988,964 | |
| 2024 | Q3 | 1,427,479 | 5,988,964 | |
| 2024 | Q2 | 1,558,184 | 5,988,964 | |
| 2024 | Q1 | 1,471,850 | 5,988,964 | |
| 2023 | Q4 | 1,428,079 | 4,623,740 | |
| 2023 | Q3 | 1,124,021 | 4,623,740 | |
| 2023 | Q2 | 1,058,686 | 4,623,740 | |
| 2023 | Q1 | 1,012,954 | 4,623,740 | |
| 2022 | Q4 | 1,049,612 | 3,325,284 | |
| 2022 | Q3 | 944,856 | 3,325,284 | |
| 2022 | Q2 | 766,459 | 3,325,284 | |
| 2022 | Q1 | 564,357 | 3,325,284 | |
| 2021 | | | 1,314,535 | |
| 2020 | | | 2,436,956 | |
| 2019 | | | 6,373,646 | |

== See also ==
- Keretapi Tanah Melayu
  - KTM Intercity & KTM ETS
    - KTM West Coast Line
    - KTM East Coast Line
  - KTM Komuter
    - Batu Caves–Pulau Sebang Line
    - Tanjung Malim–Port Klang Line
    - KL Sentral–Terminal Skypark Line
    - KTM Komuter Southern Sector
- Rail transport in Malaysia
