= Padang Besar railway station =

Railway station in Padang Besar, Perlis, Malaysia

Coordinates: 6°39′48″N 100°19′14″E

Padang Besar

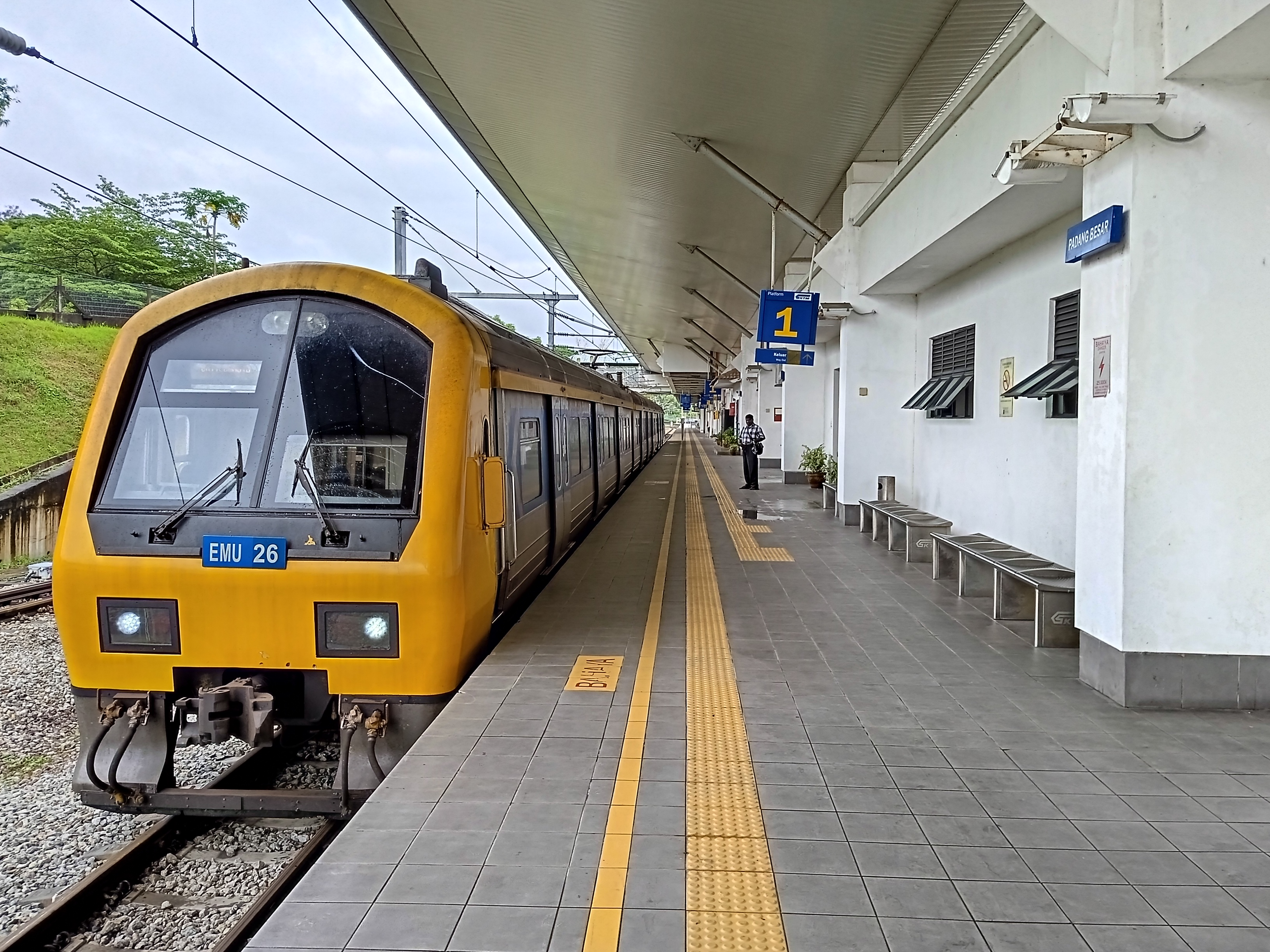
- Platform 1 of Padang Besar station

General information
- Other names: Malay: ڤادڠ بسر (Jawi); Chinese: 巴东勿刹; Tamil: பாடாங் பெசார்; Thai: ปาดังเบซาร์
- Location: Padang Besar; Perlis; Malaysia
- Owner: Railway Assets Corporation
- Operator: Keretapi Tanah Melayu
- Line: West Coast Line
- Platforms: 4
- Tracks: 5
- Train operators: Keretapi Tanah Melayu; State Railway of Thailand

Construction
- Structure type: At-grade
- Parking: Available, free.
- Accessible: Yes

History
- Opened: 1 March 1918
- Rebuilt: January 2013
- Electrified: 25 kV AC, 50 Hz

Services
Preceding station	Keretapi Tanah Melayu (Komuter)	Following station
Terminus	Padang Besar–Butterworth Line	Bukit Ketri towards Butterworth
Preceding station	Keretapi Tanah Melayu (ETS)	Following station
Terminus	KL Sentral–Padang Besar (Express)	Arau towards Kuala Lumpur Sentral
Terminus	KL Sentral–Padang Besar (Platinum)	Arau towards Kuala Lumpur Sentral
Terminus	Padang Besar–JB Sentral (Platinum)	Arau towards Johor Bahru Sentral
Terminus	Padang Besar–JB Sentral (Gold)	Arau towards Johor Bahru Sentral
Preceding station	State Railway of Thailand	Following station
Padang Besar (Thai) towards Hat Yai Junction	Southern Line Padang Besar Branch	Terminus
Location
- Location within Malaysia

The Padang Besar railway station (Malay: Stesen keretapi Padang Besar) is a railway station located at and named after the town of Padang Besar, Perlis in Malaysia. The town is located at the Malaysia-Thailand border.

It is the terminus of the KTM West Coast railway line, and connects to the State Railway of Thailand's rail network via its Southern Line at this station.

== Location ==
This station is located about 200 metres south of the actual border between Malaysia and Thailand. This station should not be confused with another station, named Padang Besar (Thai), which is located in the Thai town of Padang Besar and fully operated by SRT. The two stations are about 400 metres apart.

Despite being in Malaysian territory, owned by Malaysia's Railway Asset Corporation and operated by Keretapi Tanah Melayu (KTM), the station is served by both Malaysian and Thai railway services, allowing for passengers to transfer between the two railway systems. SRT operates a ticket office for their trains operating from the station and accept both Malaysian Ringgit and Thai Baht for ticket purchases. Malaysian and Thai immigration, customs and quarantine checkpoints are also co-located within this station specifically for cross-border train passengers.

Padang Besar railway station also has a freight yard that serves as a dry port for the northern part of Malaysia and Indonesia–Malaysia–Thailand Growth Triangle.

The station can be accessed by road which is linked to Federal Route 7 just outside Padang Besar town. The station can also be accessed via a pedestrian walkway which links the station to Padang Besar town as well as the Malaysian immigration, customs, quarantine and security checkpoint for the road border crossing. Taxis and cross-border van services to the Thai city of Hat Yai are available from the station.

== Train services ==
Padang Besar railway station is served by trains operated by both Keretapi Tanah Melayu (KTM) and the State Railway of Thailand (SRT).

Train services by Keretapi Tanah Melayu serving Malaysian destinations are:

- KTM Komuter Utara - 16 arrivals/departures a day from/to Butterworth
- KTM ETS - 4 arrivals/departures per day from/to KL Sentral, Kuala Lumpur
- KTM ETS - 2 arrivals/departures per day from/to JB Sentral, Johor via KL Sentral
- KTM Intercity MySawadee 1004/1005 - stop for immigration services for train passengers between KL Sentral and Hat Yai. Seasonal trains with irregular dates each month.

Train services by the State Railway of Thailand serving destinations in Thailand are:

- Train 45/46 Special Express - 1 arrival/departure per day from/to Krung Thep Aphiwat, combines service with Train 37/38 Special Express from Sungai Kolok at Hat Yai
- Trains 947/948 and 949/950 Ordinary Express - 2 arrivals/departures from/to Hat Yai

Since 1st September 2016, there are no regular train services that cross the border and continue down south towards Butterworth, after the termination of the State Railway of Thailand's International Express service to Butterworth, and the termination of KTM's Senandung Langkawi from Johor Bahru and later, Ekspres Semenanjung service to Hat Yai. There were talks to resume these services in 2025.

KTM has introduced a seasonal Ekspres Sawadee between Kuala Lumpur and Hat Yai in October 2022, where passengers disembark at the station to go through cross-border formalities before reboarding the train for the onward journey, similar to the practice for the previous International Express and Ekspres Semenanjung.

Below is a list of train services available as of 24 February 2026.

KTM ETS (Electric Train Service)
Service	Train No.	Departure	Towards
ETS Platinum	9223	07:20	KL Sentral
ETS Platinum	9425	08:15	JB Sentral
ETS Platinum	9225	09:45	KL Sentral
ETS Gold	9449	12:05	JB Sentral
ETS Express	9209	13:50	KL Sentral
ETS Platinum	9233	17:00	KL Sentral

KTM Komuter Northern Sector (Padang Besar–Butterworth Line)
Train No.	Departure	Towards
2941	05:20	Butterworth
2943	05:40	Butterworth
2945	06:00	Butterworth
2947	06:20	Butterworth
2951	07:35	Butterworth
2955	08:35	Butterworth
2959	10:35	Butterworth
2963	12:35	Butterworth
2967	14:35	Butterworth
2969	15:05	Butterworth
2971	15:35	Butterworth
2975	16:35	Butterworth
2979	17:05	Butterworth
2981	17:35	Butterworth
2985	18:35	Butterworth
2987	19:05	Butterworth
2991	19:35	Butterworth
2997	21:35	Butterworth

State Railway of Thailand
Service	Train No.	Departure	Towards
ORDINARY EXPRESS	948	11:15	Hat Yai Junction
ORDINARY EXPRESS	950	16:40	Hat Yai Junction
SPECIAL EXPRESS	46	18:00	Krung Thep Aphiwat Central Terminal

MySawasdee (Seasonal KL–Hatyai direct service)
Service	Train No.	Arrival	Towards	Note
MySawasdee	EXPRESS 1004	Unknown	Hat Yai Junction, Songkhla	Seasonal, not allowed to board from Padang Besar.
MySawasdee	EXPRESS 1005	Unknown	KL Sentral, Kuala Lumpur	Seasonal, not allowed to board from Padang Besar.

== Bus Services ==
Feeder bus services are available from the nearby Padang Besar Hub Station, via Bas.My Kangar service.

Route type	Route No.	Origin	Destination
BAS.MY Kangar	R105	Padang Besar Hub	Kaki Bukit Health Clinic
BAS.MY Kangar	R11	Padang Besar Hub	Bukit Langit Terminal Kangar

== Railway border crossing ==
The Padang Besar railway station has Malaysia's only co-located or juxtaposed border crossing checkpoint where customs, immigration and quarantine facilities for both Malaysia and Thailand are housed inside the station which is wholly located inside Malaysia territory (200 metres south of the border).

The facilities for each country operate from separate counters inside the railway station building at the platform level. After disembarking from a train, rail passengers are processed for exiting or entering both countries by walking from one counter to the other before boarding trains travelling into the relevant countries.

While the checkpoints at the station bears the same entry and exit point names as the road immigration checkpoints, the facilities in the station operates separately and is only for cross-border rail passengers. The facilities only open when Thailand trains arrive at and depart from the station, thus making clearance not possible after the last train to Bangkok departs at 6.00 pm Malaysian time.

== Gallery ==
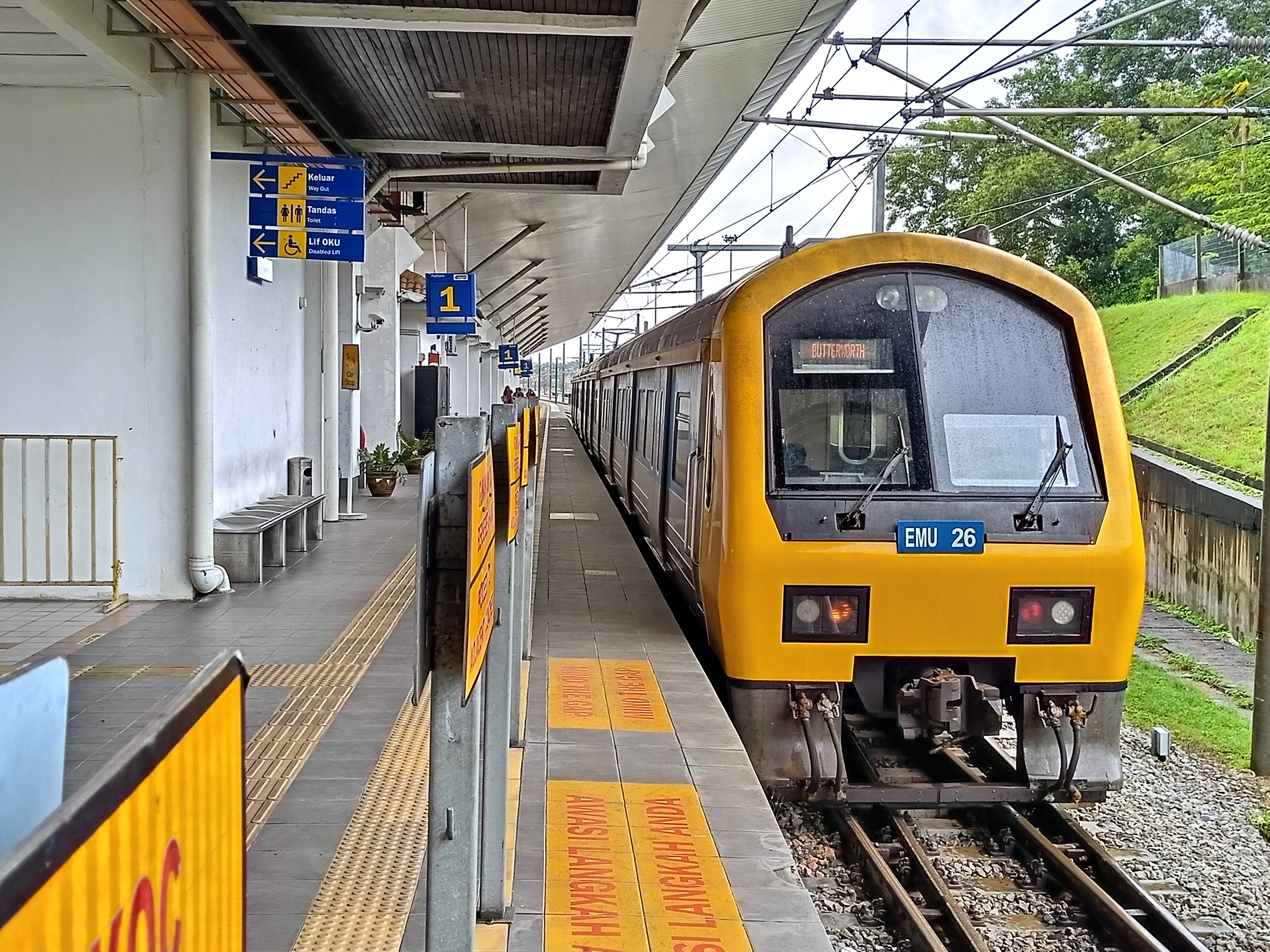
Platform 1 of the station.

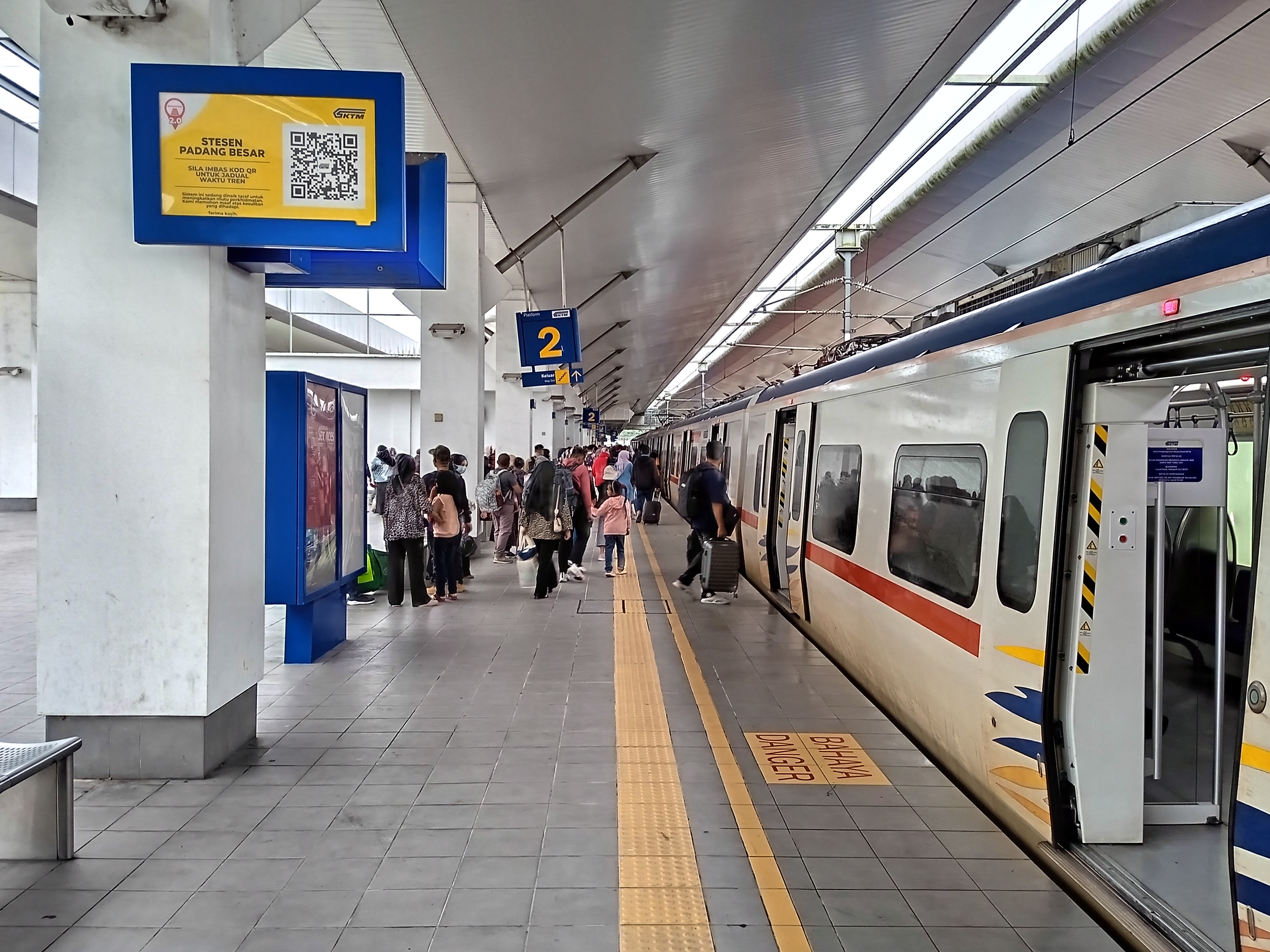
Platform 2 of the station.

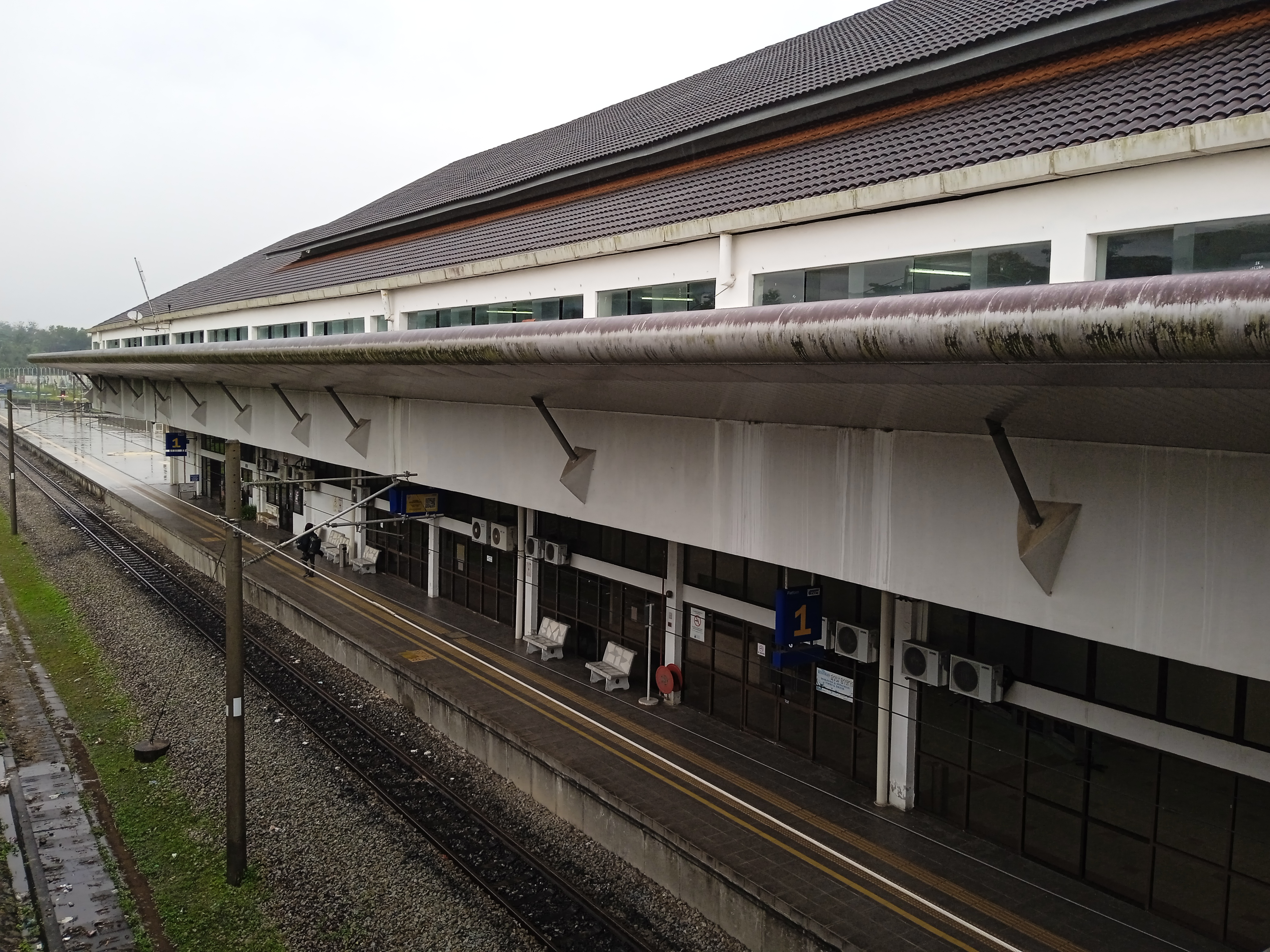
Station building.

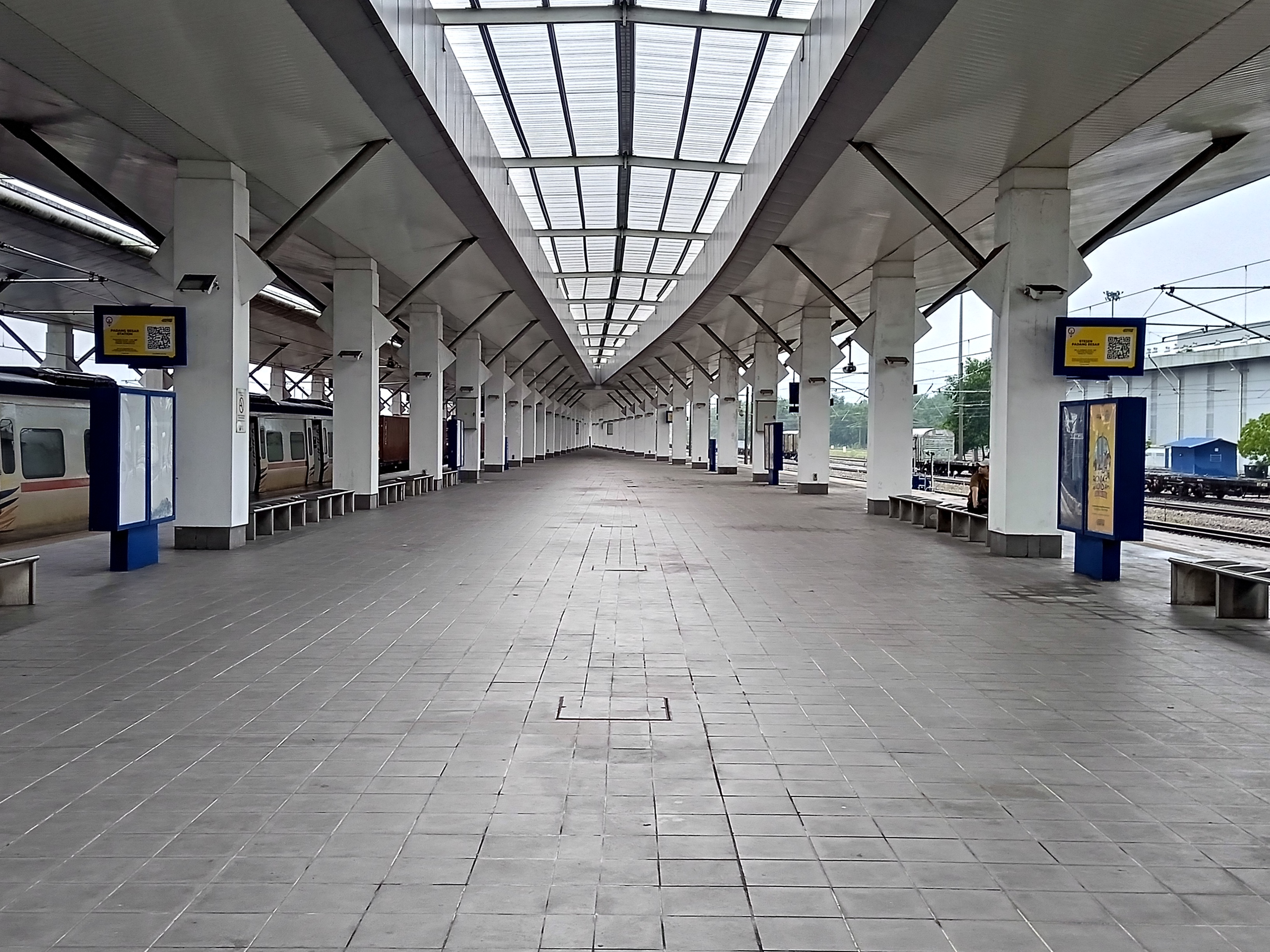
Platforms level.

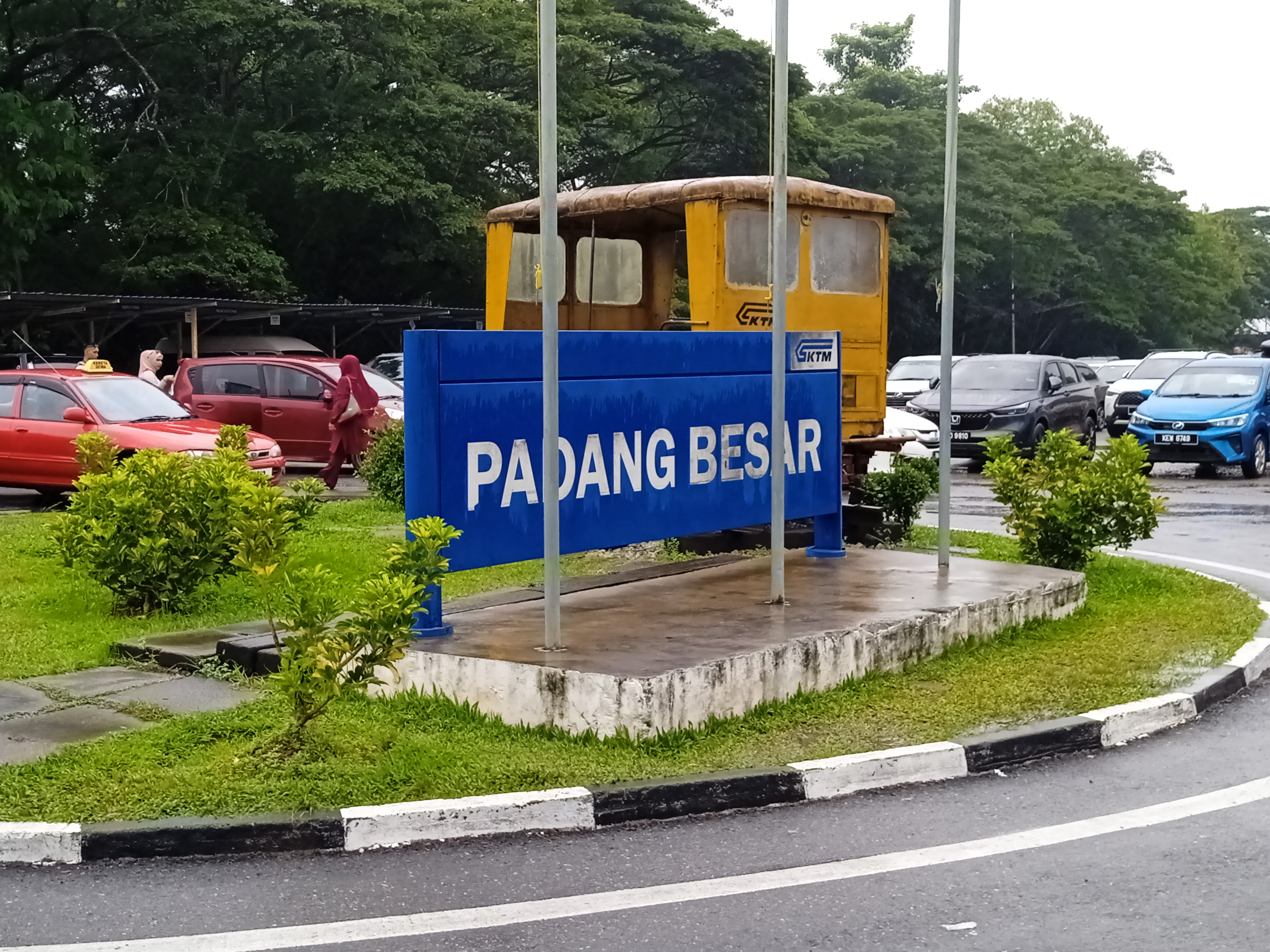
Station name sign.

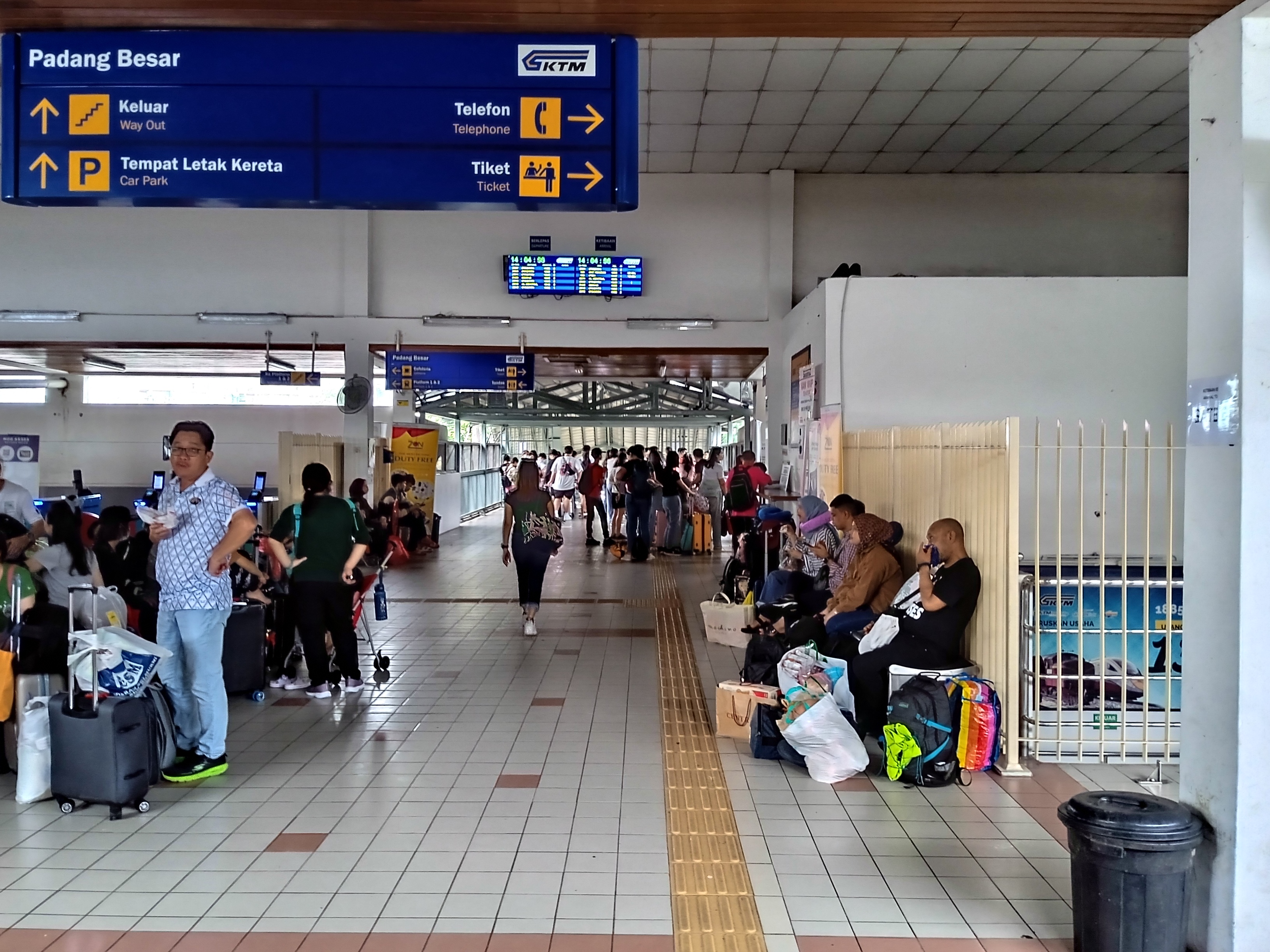
Concourse of the station.

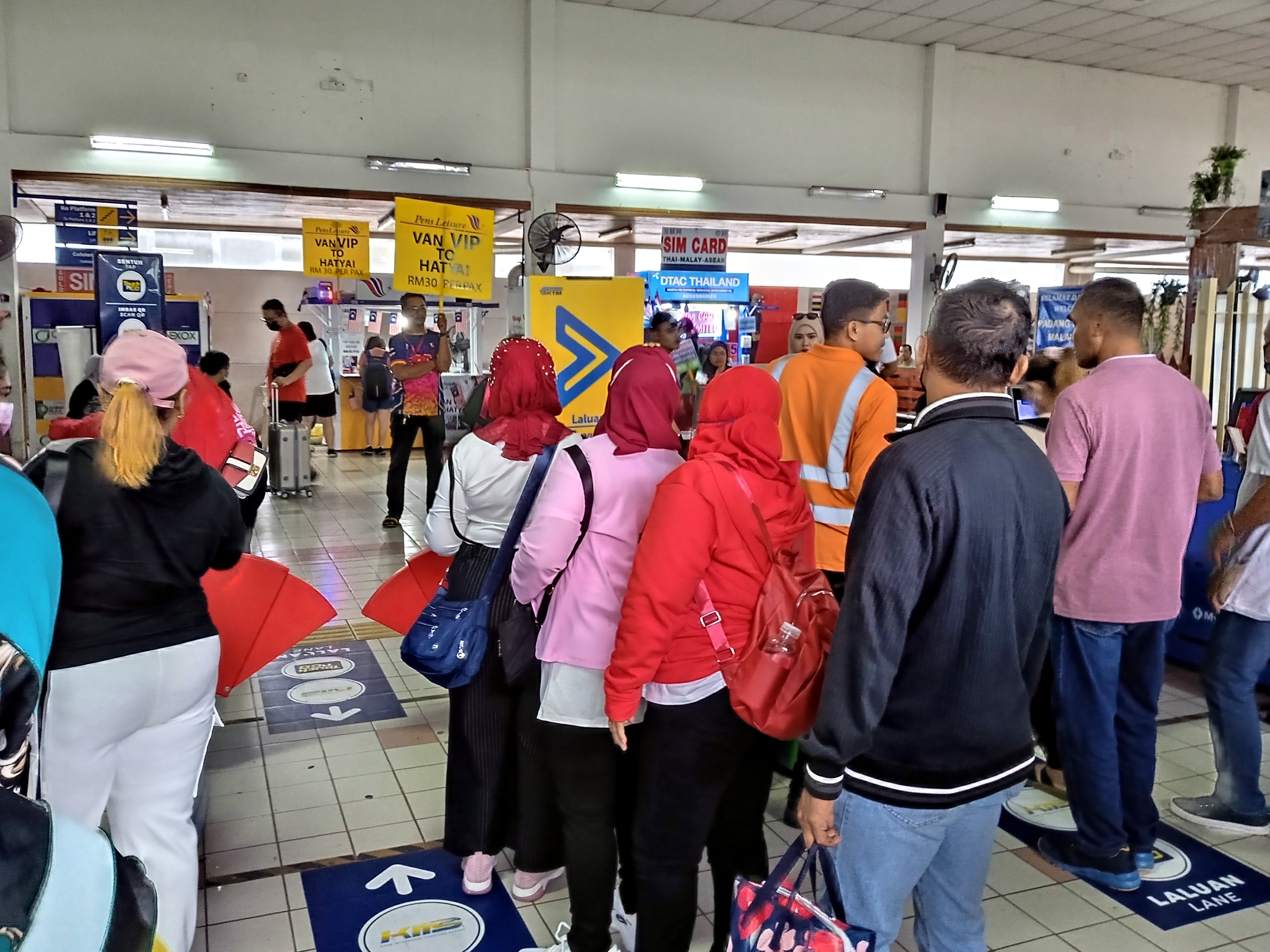
Concourse of the station.

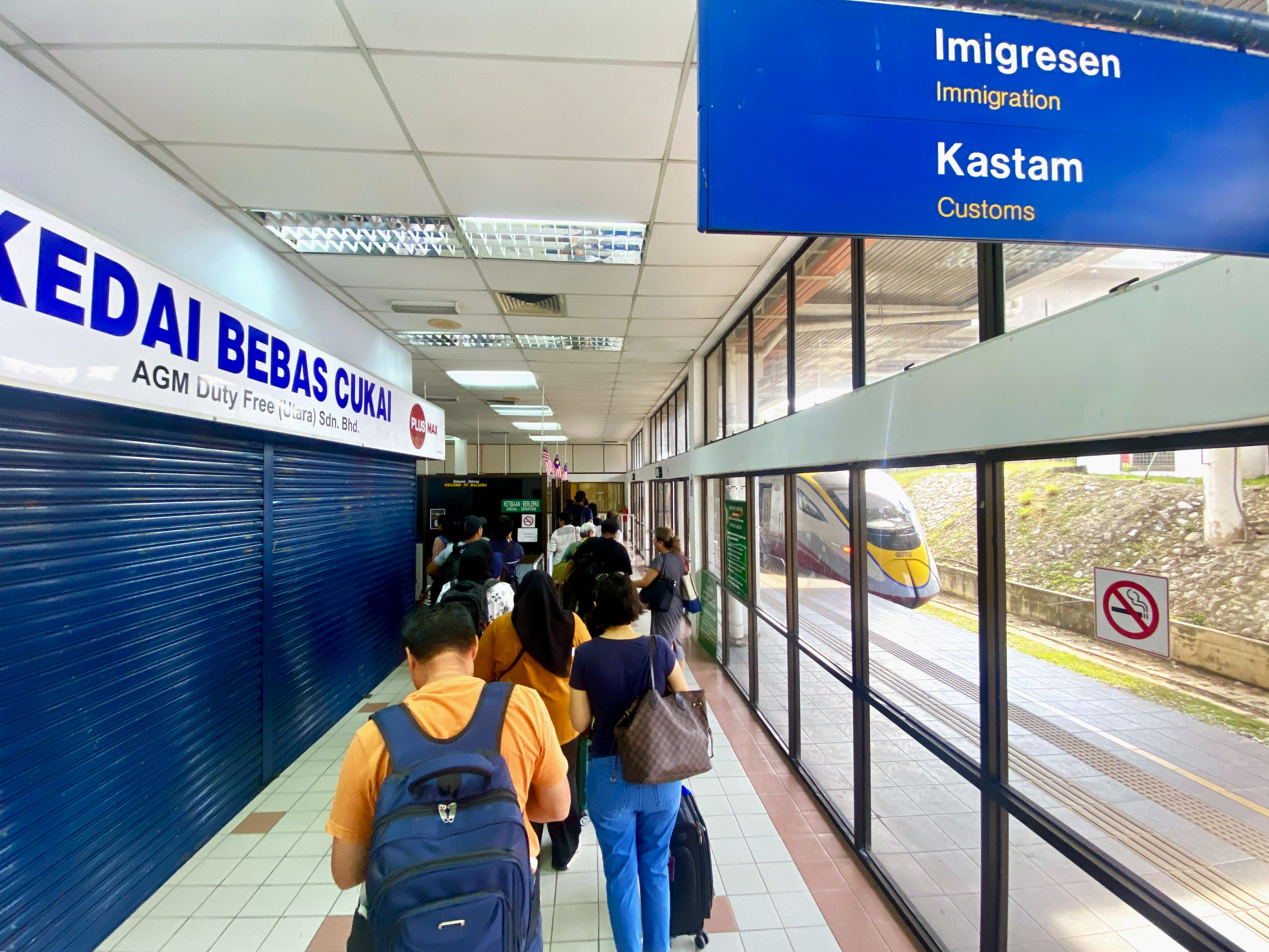
Malaysian immigration checkpoint in the station.

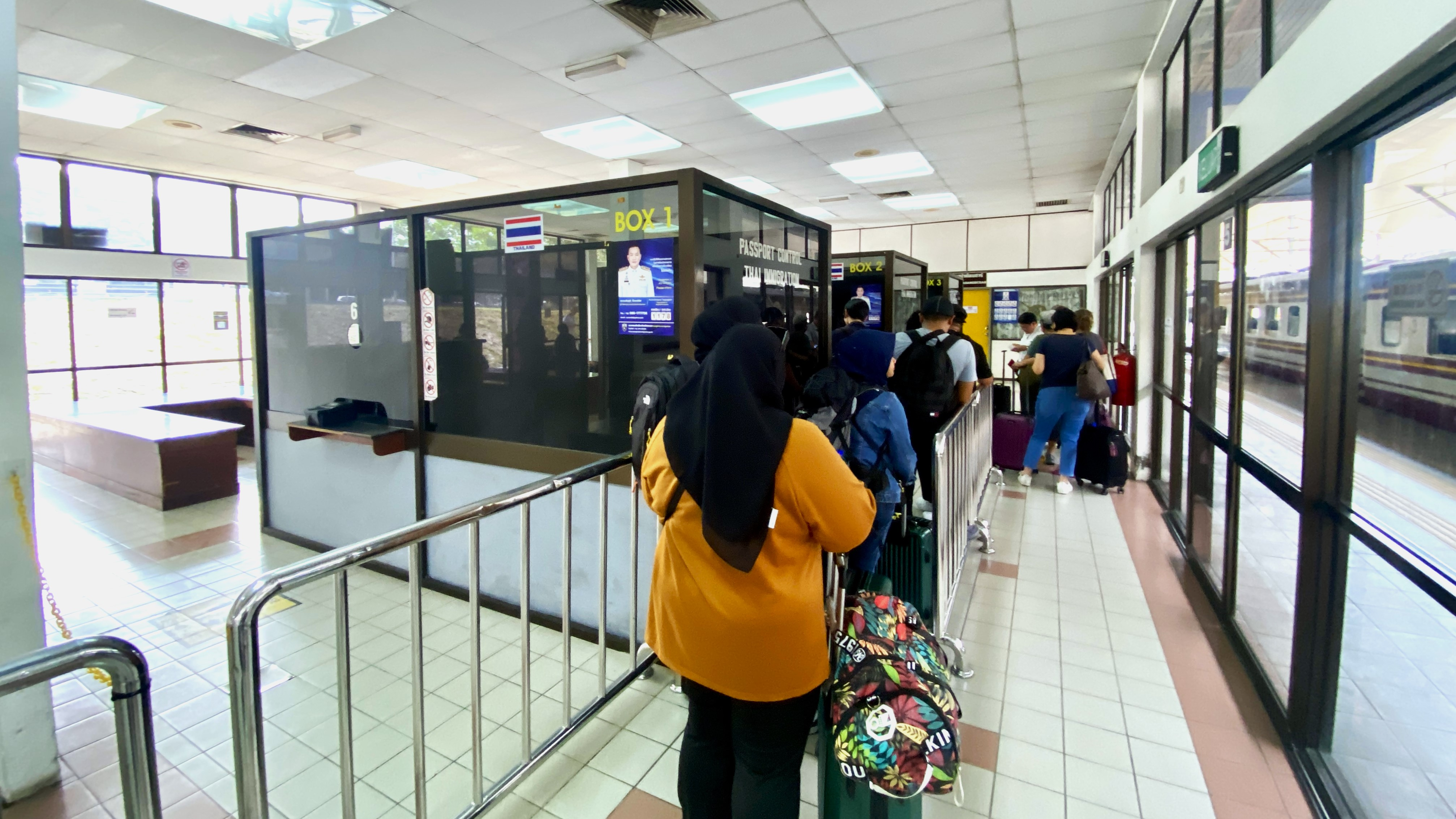
Thai immigration checkpoint in the station.
