= Butterworth railway station =

Railway station in Butterworth, Malaysia

Coordinates: 5°23′36″N 100°21′59″E

Butterworth
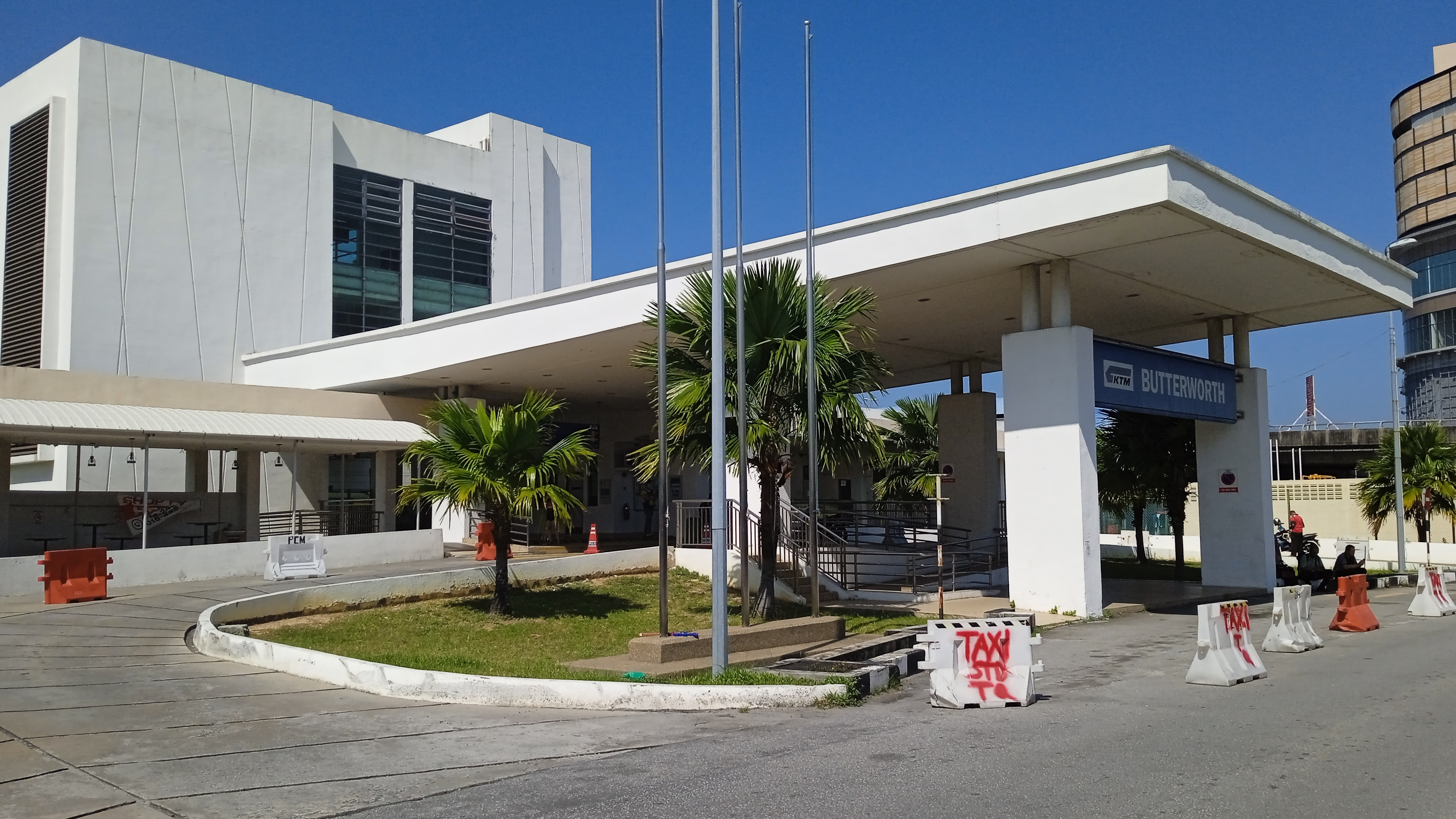
- Entrance of the station, 2023

General information
- Other names: Malay: باتروورث (Jawi); Chinese: 北海; Tamil: பட்டர்வொர்த்
- Location: Jalan Bagan Dalam, Butterworth; 12000 Seberang Perai; Penang, Malaysia
- Owner: Railway Assets Corporation
- Operator: Keretapi Tanah Melayu
- Line: West Coast Line (Butterworth branch)
- Platforms: 2 island platforms
- Tracks: 5
- Connections: Penang ferry service (Sultan Abdul Halim Ferry Terminal); Penang Sentral Lean Hock: 62 Gopi: 17 Rapid Penang: 601, 603, 604, 605, 613, 701, 702, 703, 706, 709, 801, EB60, EB80

Construction
- Parking: Available for free
- Accessible: Yes

History
- Opened: 15 September 1967; 59 years ago
- Rebuilt: 5 August 2011; 15 years ago – 2014; 12 years ago
- Electrified: 2014; 12 years ago – July 2015; 11 years ago

Passengers
- 2025: 982,830
- Rank: 4th of 155
Services
Preceding station	KTM Komuter	Following station
Terminus	Ipoh–Butterworth Line	Bukit Tengah towards Ipoh
Bukit Tengah towards Padang Besar	Padang Besar–Butterworth Line	Terminus
Preceding station	ETS	Following station
Terminus	KL Sentral–Butterworth Express Platinum	Bukit Mertajam towards KL Sentral
Terminus	Butterworth–JB Sentral Platinum	Bukit Mertajam towards JB Sentral
Terminus	Butterworth–Segamat Gold	Bukit Mertajam towards Segamat
Location

Butterworth station is a railway station serving Butterworth, the city centre of Seberang Perai, Penang. The terminus of the Butterworth branch of the West Coast line, the station is a major terminal for the ETS and KTM Komuter Northern Sector, serving Malaysia's West Coast cities. The station is a component of Penang Sentral, with connections to the Penang ferry service and a public bus and intercity bus hub. Prior to 2017, it served as the southern terminal of the International Express from Bangkok, Thailand.

Plans for the station was announced in 1960 as part of an extension of the Penang branch of the West Coast line from Prai to Butterworth. Construction of the station began in January 1965 and was inaugurated with the rest of the extension line on 15 September 1967. Upon its opening, it replaced Prai's role as Penang's principal railway terminal. The original station was demolished in August 2011 and reopened in 2014. In July 2015, electrification of the railway line was completed, and in 2018 it was integrated within Penang Sentral.

As of 2026, the station has 76 daily services, with an annual ridership of 982,830 passengers in 2025, the busiest in Penang and the fourth busiest in all Keretapi Tanah Melayu operated stations in Malaysia.

== History ==
Between 1899 to 1967, Prai station served as the terminus for the Penang branch of the West Coast line, and the main gateway to George Town via rail from the Malay Peninsula. In 1907, a station for Butterworth, which was to be located in Bagan Luar, was rumored to have been considered in early proposals to extend the railway beyond Prai into Kedah. However, the proposal never materialised, as it required the construction of a bridge across the Prai River, whose construction was considered to be too challenging and expensive.

However, the need for a rail station in Butterworth was reconsidered after Prai's decline as a commercial and shipping centre, which had lost out to Butterworth after the 1920s. Furthermore, passengers disembarking from Prai had to take a ferry service from the Prai River to George Town separate from the Penang ferry service, which by the 1960s consisted of an aging fleet marred by maintenance issues, inconvenience, and rising expenses.

Plans for an extension of the Penang branch line was revived by consultants as early as 1957. In June 1959, the federal government announced their intention to extend the northern terminus to Butterworth, with the construction of a swing bridge across the Prai River and close connections to the Sultan Abdul Halim Ferry Terminal of the main existing ferry service. In 1960, plans for a MS$7 million railway terminal at Butterworth was announced, which includes a 1,250 ft (380 metres) platform that was described as the longest of its kind in Malaya.

Preliminary works was planned to start in late-1960, although it was only in July 1962 when the extension project was officially approved. Financing was secured in December 1963 with a MS$15.25 million loan to the Malaysian government from the Chase Manhattan Bank. In 1964, clearing works for the station was delayed by the need to relocate a local keramat that housed a 180-year old cannon worshipped by locals for its reputed "healing abilities". A call for tender for the station's construction was undertaken in June 1964, and was awarded to Chew Ho Construction Co. Ltd. in January 1965. By October 1965, construction of the station was projected to be complete by August 1967.

Although planned for an opening date on Merdeka Day 1967, delays in the construction of the swing bridge resulted in reports that the station could not be open before Malaysia Day celebrations on 16 September. Nevertheless, the station and the bridge was inaugurated in a short ceremony on 15 September 1967 by Sultan Ismail Nasiruddin Shah, the King of Malaysia. The final cost for the station was reported to be MS$1.5 million. Upon its opening, all train routes to Prai were redirected to Butterworth, except for regular services towards Kedah and Ipoh which still ran at Prai until late-October with a complimentary bus connection between the two stations. Prai station closed in October 1967.

In 1997, the railway line was extended northwards by 2 km (1.2 miles) from the station to connect with the North Butterworth Container Terminal.

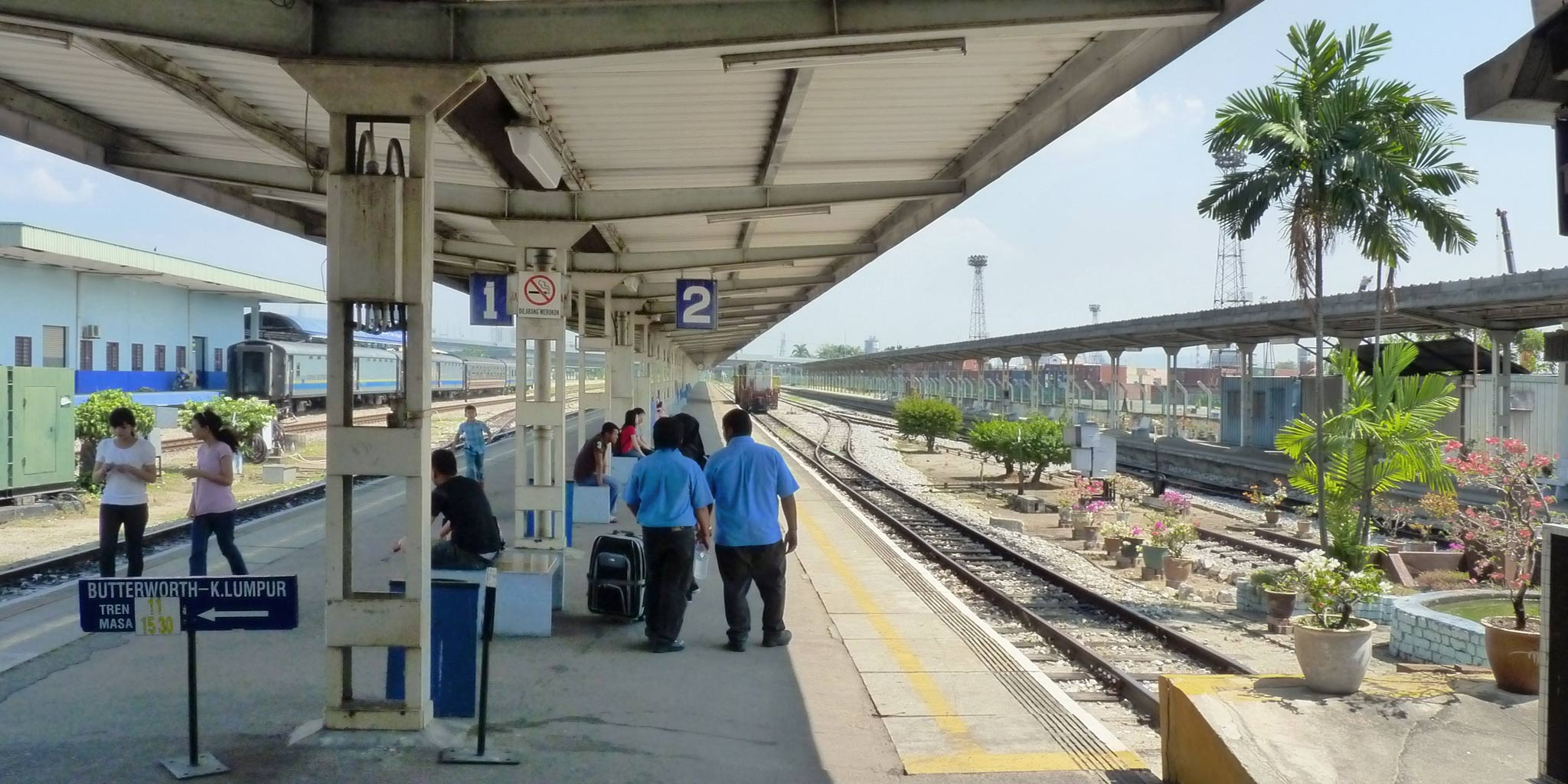
Station platform prior to reconstruction, 2011.

On 5 August 2011, the station was officially closed and demolished for redevelopment. It was replaced with a temporary station located about 30 m (98 feet) away until 2014, when construction of the new station building was complete. Electrification of the station was completed in 2015 in conjunction with the rest of the West Coast line, with the inauguration of KTM Komuter and ETS services on 10 July and 11 September 2015 respectively. In 2018, the station was integrated within Penang Sentral via a 200 m (660 feet) pedestrian walkway. In December 2025, renovation works of the station was announced, which was scheduled for completion by late-2026.

== Services ==
=== Current services ===
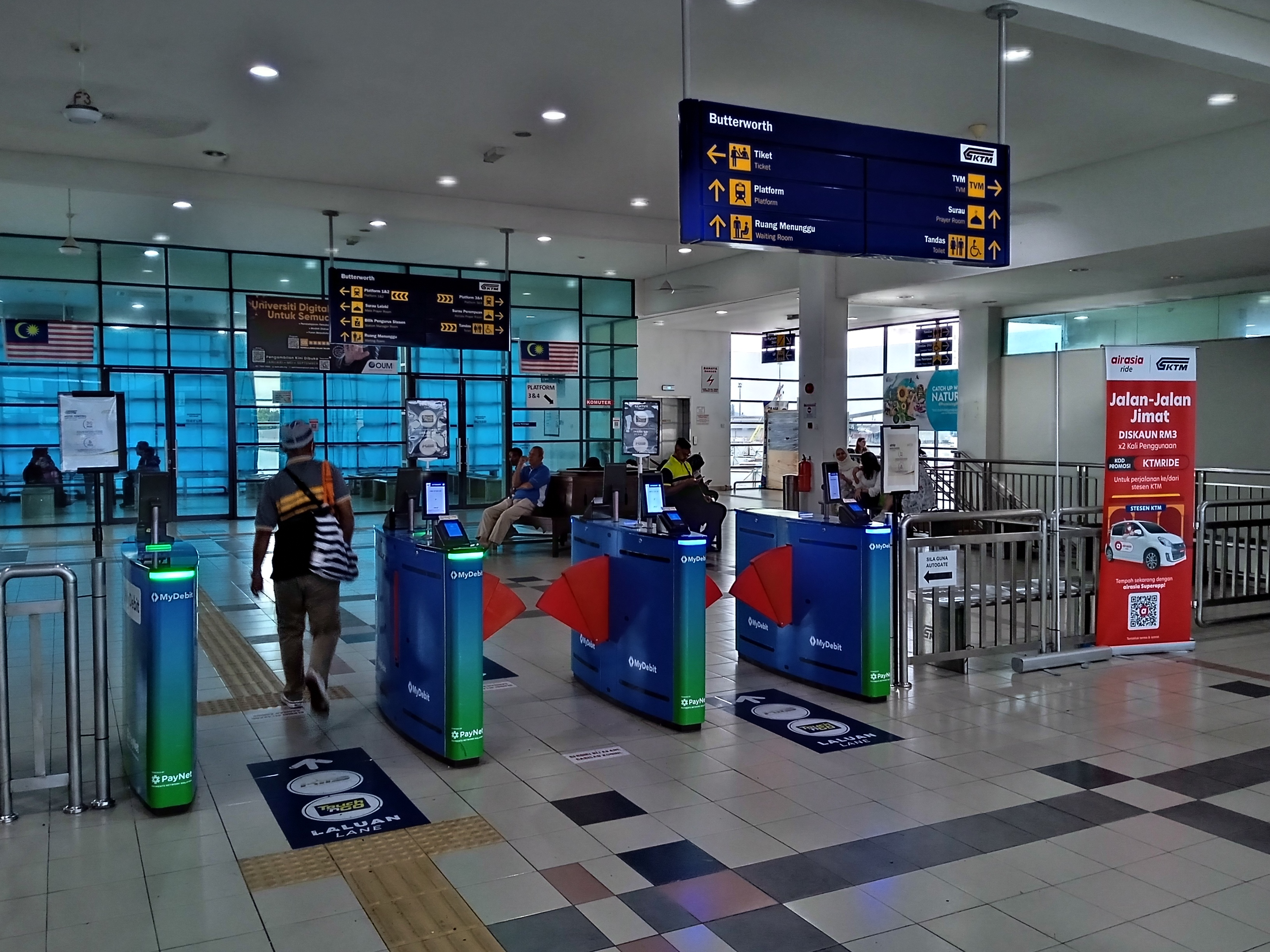
Station concourse, 2023

Butterworth station is the central terminus for KTM Komuter Northern Sector services for the Padang Besar–Butterworth and Butterworth–Ipoh lines. As of July 2026, there are 62 daily commuter services, with annual ridership figures of 691,256 passengers in 2025, the second busiest in all Komuter stations, only behind KL Sentral.

The station also serves as a northern terminus for four ETS routes with 14 daily inter-city services as of June 2026, with annual ridership figures of 290,779 passengers in 2025, the third busiest of all ETS stations.

Since 1993, the station serves as a stop for the Eastern & Oriental Express, a seasonal luxury cruise train that operates across the Malay Peninsula. Services were suspended in 2020 during the COVID-19 pandemic until February 2024 with the reintroduction of two routes between Singapore and Perlis. Annual ridership was estimated at 2,500 passengers in 2019.

List of rail services of Butterworth station (as of July 2026)
Service	Type	Route	Trip schedule			Ridership (2025)
Service	Type	Route	Trips	First	Last	Ridership (2025)
KTM Komuter Northern Sector	Commuter	Padang Besar–Butterworth	19	05:20 a.m.	21:40 p.m.	691,256; 2nd of 81
KTM Komuter Northern Sector	Commuter	Ipoh–Butterworth	12	05:30 a.m.	20:10 p.m.	691,256; 2nd of 81
KTM ETS	Inter-city	Butterworth–KL Sentral (Platinum)	4	05:15 a.m.	18:45 p.m.	290,779; 3rd of 45
KTM ETS	Inter-city	Butterworth–KL Sentral (Express)	1	13:05 p.m.		290,779; 3rd of 45
KTM ETS	Inter-city	Butterworth–JB Sentral (Platinum)	1	07:00 a.m.		290,779; 3rd of 45
KTM ETS	Inter-city	Butterworth–Segamat (Gold)	1	07:50 a.m.		290,779; 3rd of 45
Eastern & Oriental Express	Seasonal	Essence of Malaysia	–	–	–	≈2,500 (2019)
Eastern & Oriental Express	Seasonal	Wild Malaysia	–	–	–	≈2,500 (2019)

=== Ridership ===
As of July 2026, there are 76 daily services to-and-fro from Butterworth station, with annual ridership figures of 982,830 passengers and 1.057 million arrivals for all KTM services, the fourth highest in all KTM operated stations.

- Komuter
- ETS
- Intercity

Ridership figures for Butterworth station, 15 October 2020 – 31 December 2025
Service	Type	Year					
Service	Type	2020	2021	2022	2023	2024	2025
KTM Komuter Northern Sector	Commuter	26,379	90,800	324,487	493,929	616,311	691,256
KTM ETS	Inter-city	5,584	23,589	175,765	252,119	281,095	290,779
KTM Intercity	Inter-city	–	–	–	–	346	795
Summary		31,963	114,389	500,252	746,048	897,752	982,830

Arrival figures for Butterworth station, 15 October 2020 – 31 December 2025
Service	Type	Year					
Service	Type	2020	2021	2022	2023	2024	2025
KTM Komuter Northern Sector	Commuter	32,804	110,853	368,591	564,905	680,710	741,634
KTM ETS	Inter-city	6,995	25,344	192,386	271,782	306,566	314,161
KTM Intercity	Inter-city	–	–	–	–	156	934
Summary		39,799	136,197	560,977	836,687	987,432	1,056,729

=== Former services ===
Between 1967 to 2016, Butterworth served as the southern terminus for the International Express rail service towards Hat Yai and Bangkok, although there were plans for a revival of the service in 2024. The station also offered railbus services to Arau and Ipoh from 1987 until their retirement in the late-1990s.

Between 1980 to 2016, the station was the northern terminus for diesel-powered KTM Intercity services such as the Ekspres Rakyat, Ekspres Sinaran, and Senandung Mutiara, which ran between Butterworth and Singapore via Kuala Lumpur. Ekspres Sinaran was once terminated in 1988, reinstated sometime after, and ran at least until 2013. After the station's electrification in 2015, diesel locomotives were fully retired, with the last Ekspres Rakyat service terminated on 9 May 2016.

== Connections ==
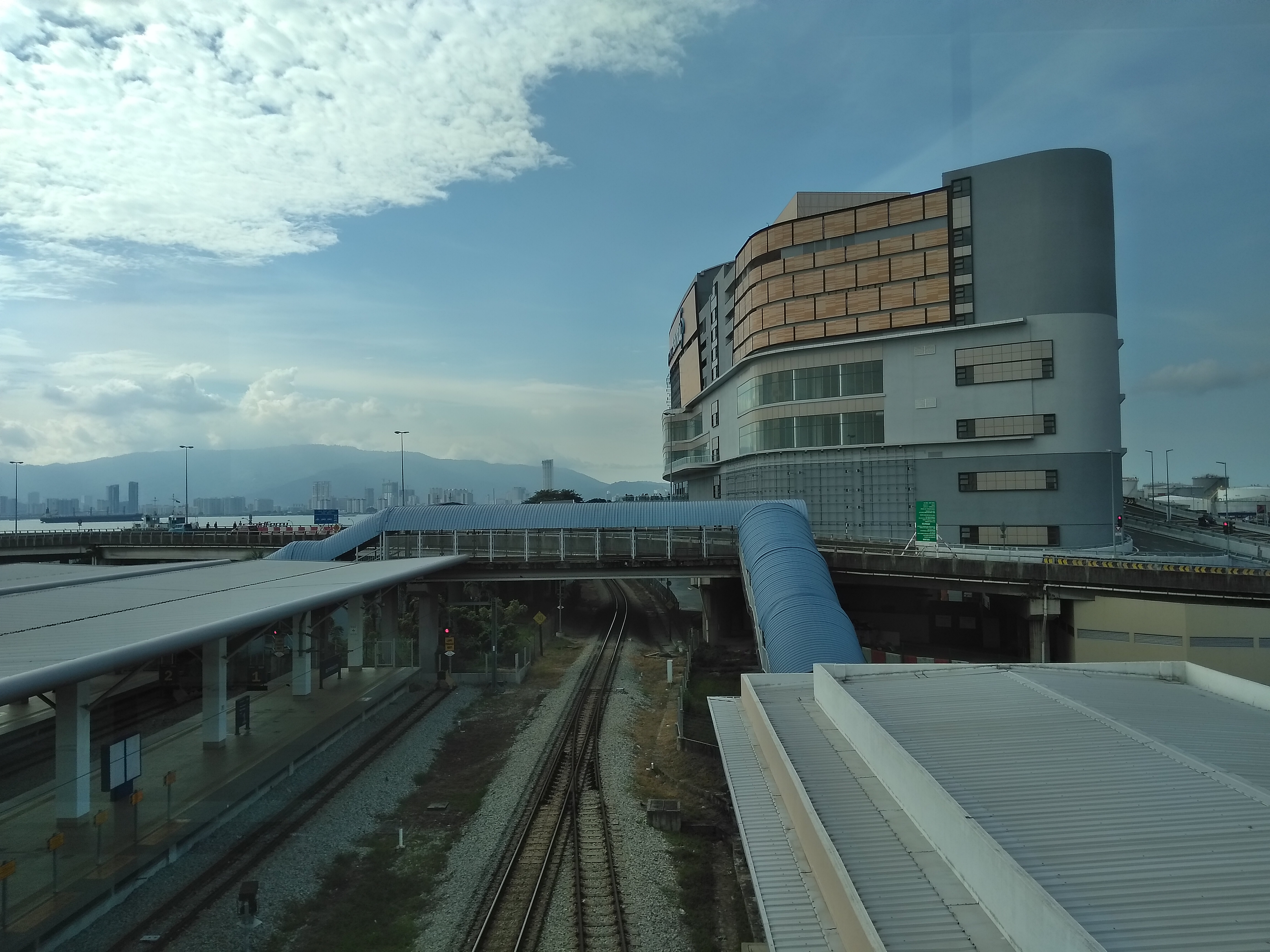
End of the line leading towards Penang Sentral.

Since 2018, Butterworth is integrated within Penang Sentral, the main transport hub serving Seberang Perai. The station has connections to a public bus terminal, an intercity bus terminal, and the Sultan Abdul Halim Ferry Terminal of the Penang ferry service.

Through Penang Sentral, the station is served by Rapid Penang bus routes 601, 603, 604, 605, 613, 701, 702, 703, 706, 709, 801, EB60, EB80, Lean Hock bus route 62, and Gopi bus route 17, serving Seberang Perai, Parit Buntar, Kulim, and Sungai Petani.

The station is expected to be integrated with the Mutiara Line via Penang Sentral, which is scheduled for completion in 2031.

== Gallery ==
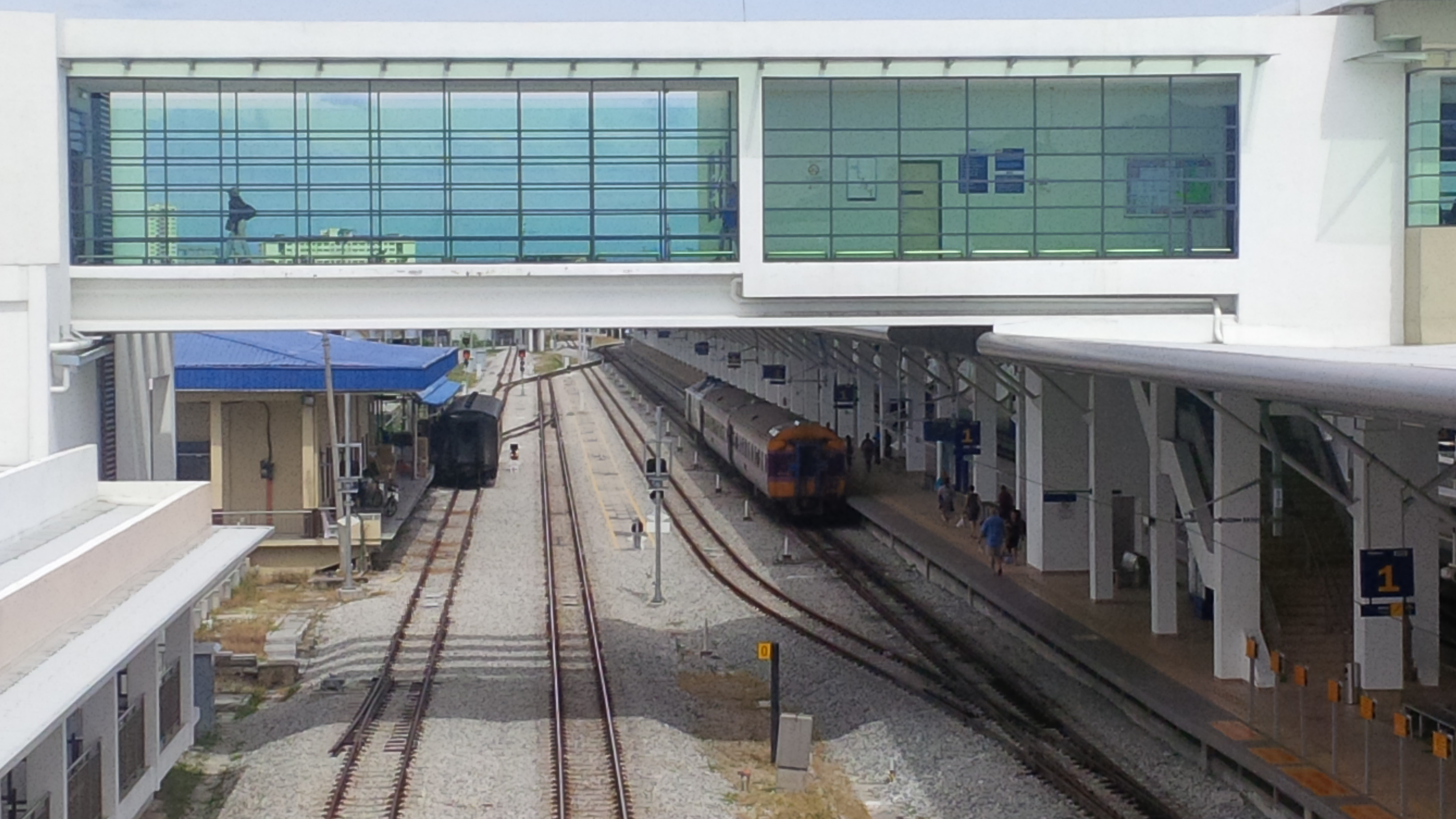
"Chainage Zero" sign between the tracks beneath the pedestrian walkway.

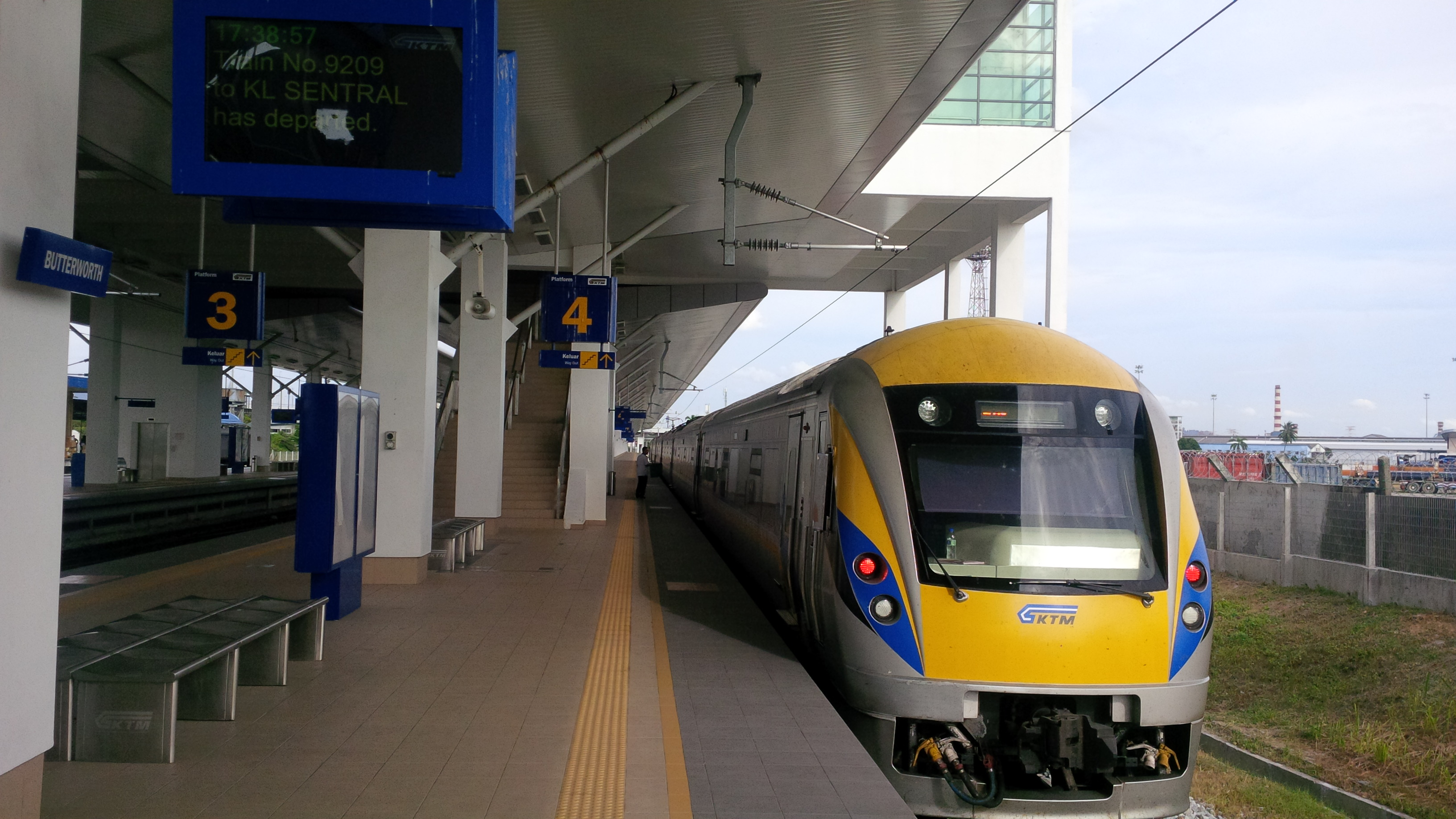
ETS train at platform, August 2015.

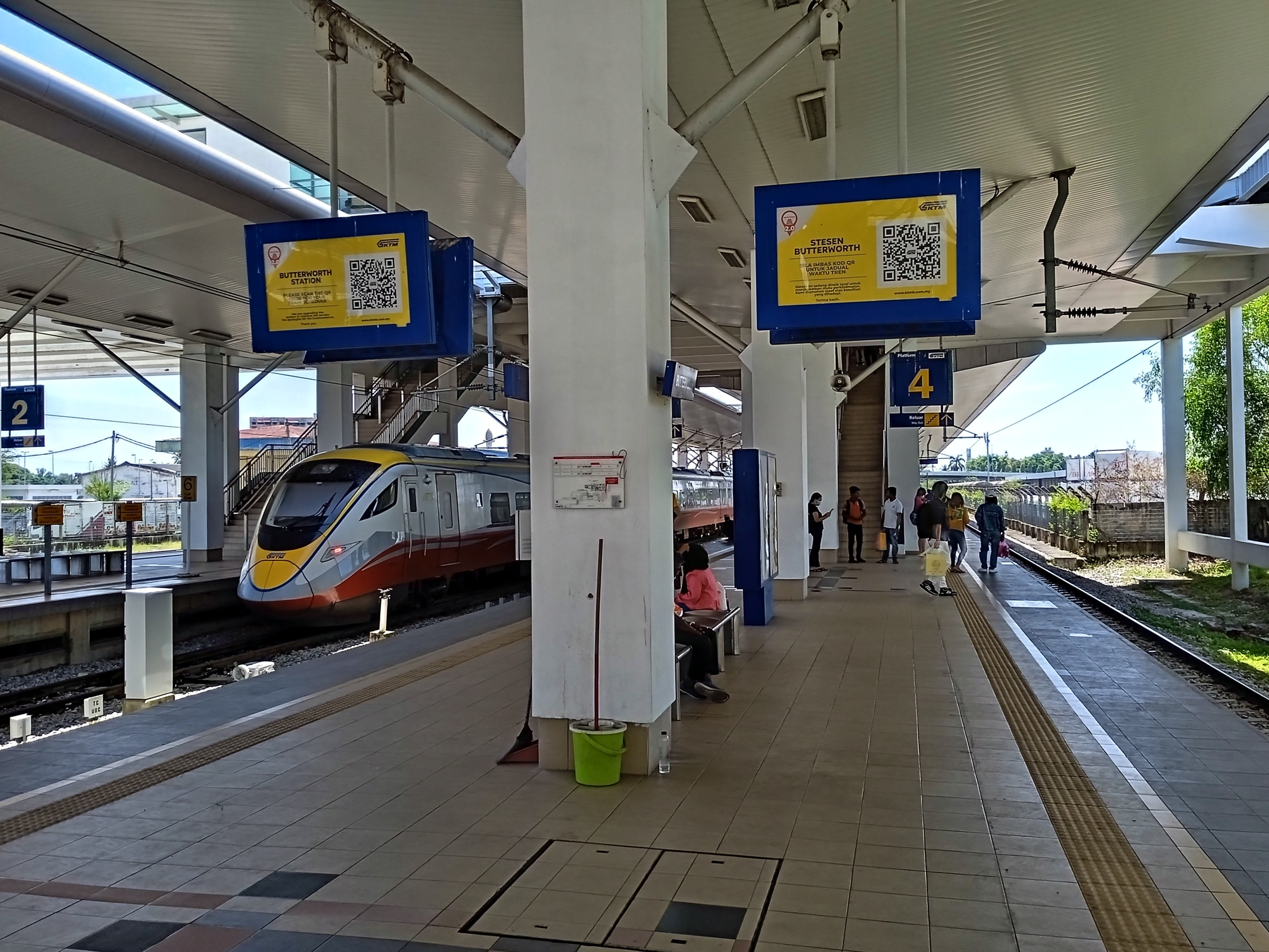
Platform area, 2023.
