= Batang Melaka =

Town in Jasin, Melaka, Malaysia

Coordinates: 2°28′N 102°25′E

Batang Melaka Batang Melako (Negeri Sembilan Malay)
- Mukim
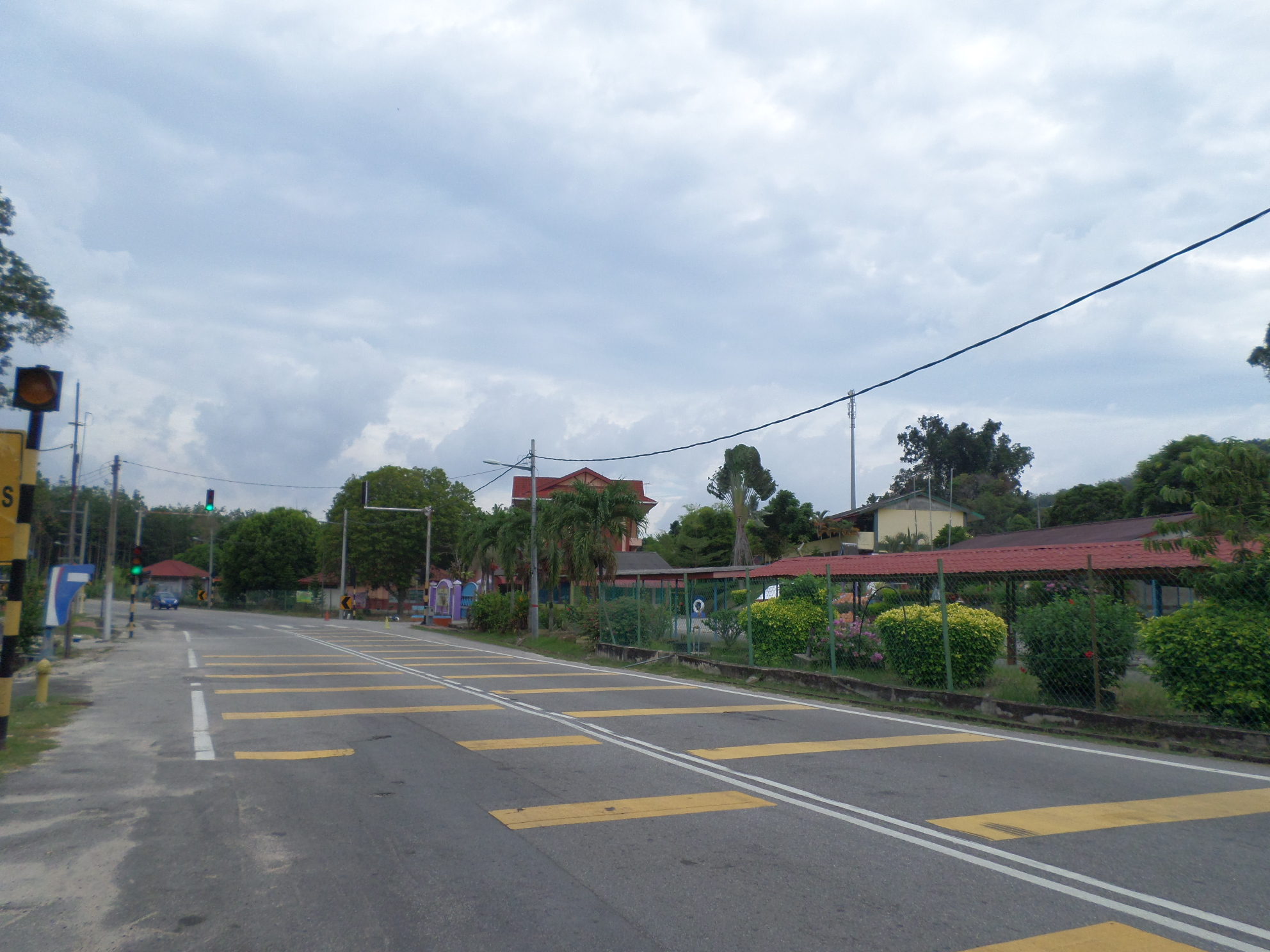

- Batang Melaka in Jasin District
- Country: Malaysia
- State: Malacca
- District: Jasin

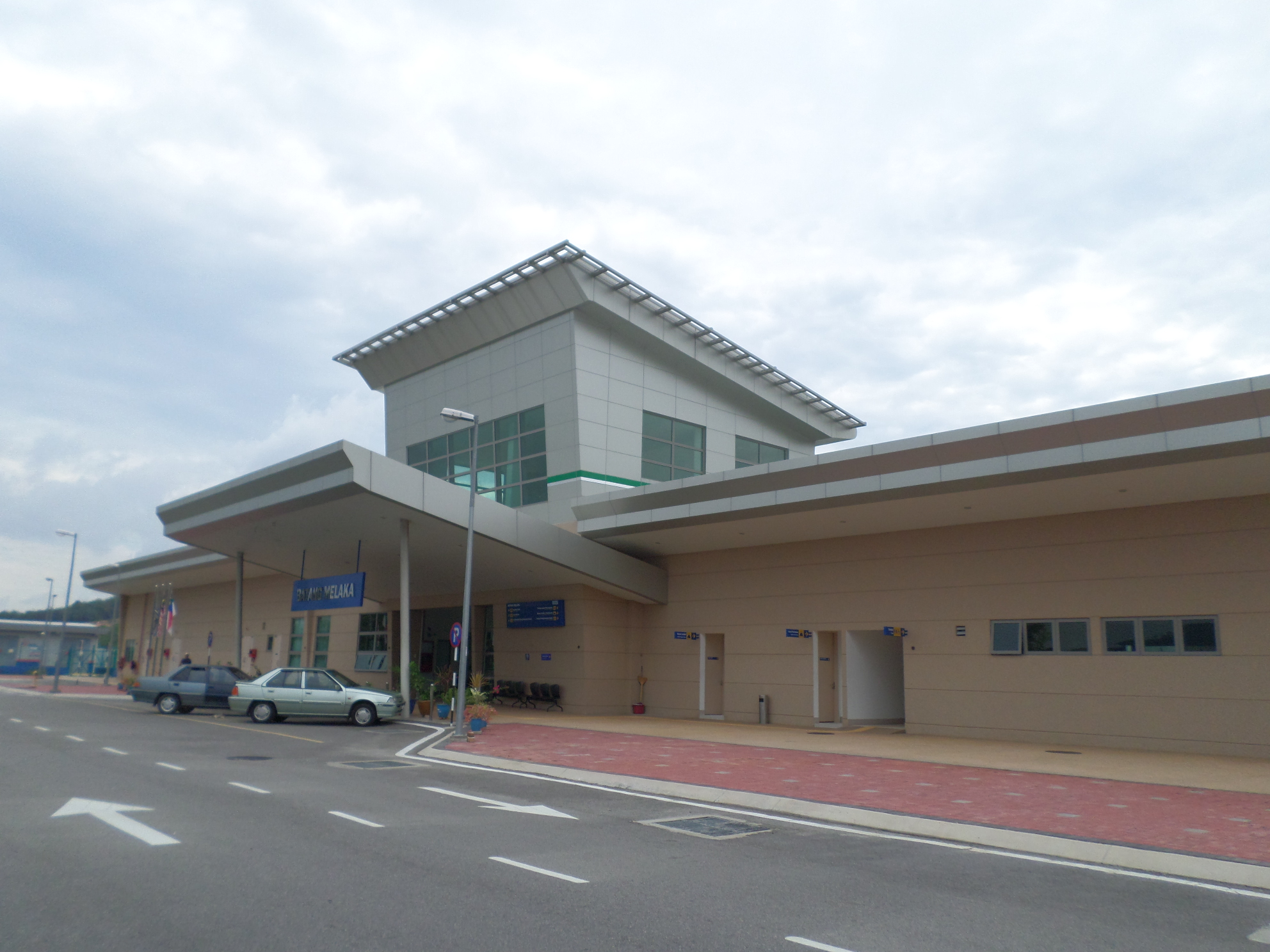
Batang Melaka railway station

Batang Melaka (Negeri Sembilan Malay: Batang Melako, Jawi: باتڠ ملاك) is a mukim and town in Jasin District, Malacca, Malaysia. Located at the Negeri Sembilan state border, part of the town itself is within Negeri Sembilan. It is about 52 kilometers from Melaka Sentral and is connected by the Panorama Bus (formerly Batang Bus) through Durian Tunggal and Selandar. Batang Melaka has a small police station, a Chinese and Tamil government school, a town hall, a Salvation Army Corps centre, and one main road passing in the middle of the town.

== Transportation ==
- Batang Melaka Railway Station - One of two railway stations serving the State of Malacca. (The other being Pulau Sebang/Tampin railway station)

== See also ==
- List of cities and towns in Malaysia by population
- Pulau Sebang
- Tampin (town)
