= Pulau Sebang =

Coordinates: 2°28′N 102°14′E

Pulau Sebang Pulau Sobang (Negeri Sembilan Malay)
- Mukim
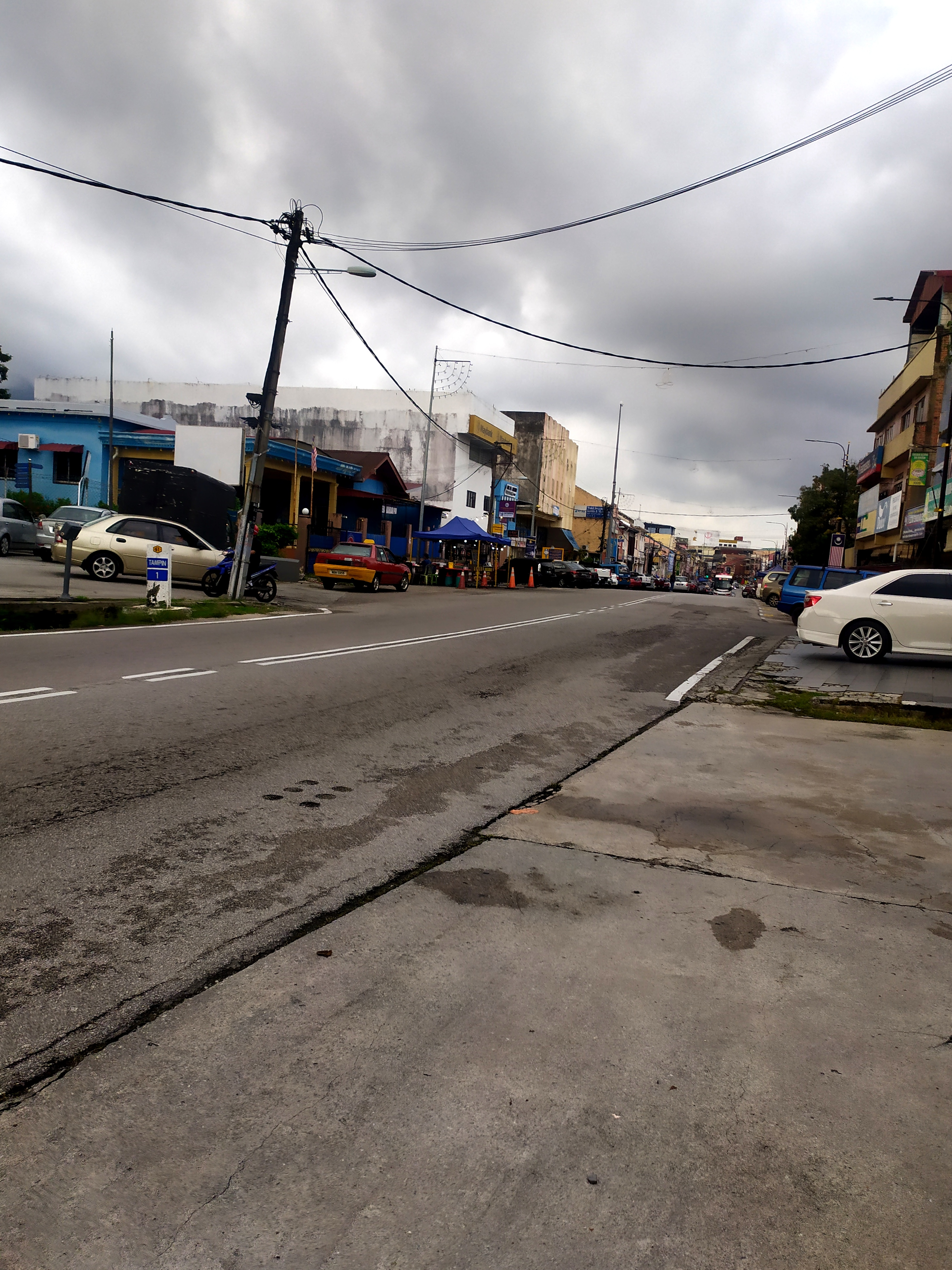
- Interactive map of Pulau Sebang
- Country: Malaysia
- State: Malacca
- District: Alor Gajah

Pulau Sebang (Negeri Sembilan Malay: Pulau Sobang) is a mukim and town in Alor Gajah District, Malacca, Malaysia, which borders Tampin town of Tampin District, Negeri Sembilan.

== Infrastructures ==
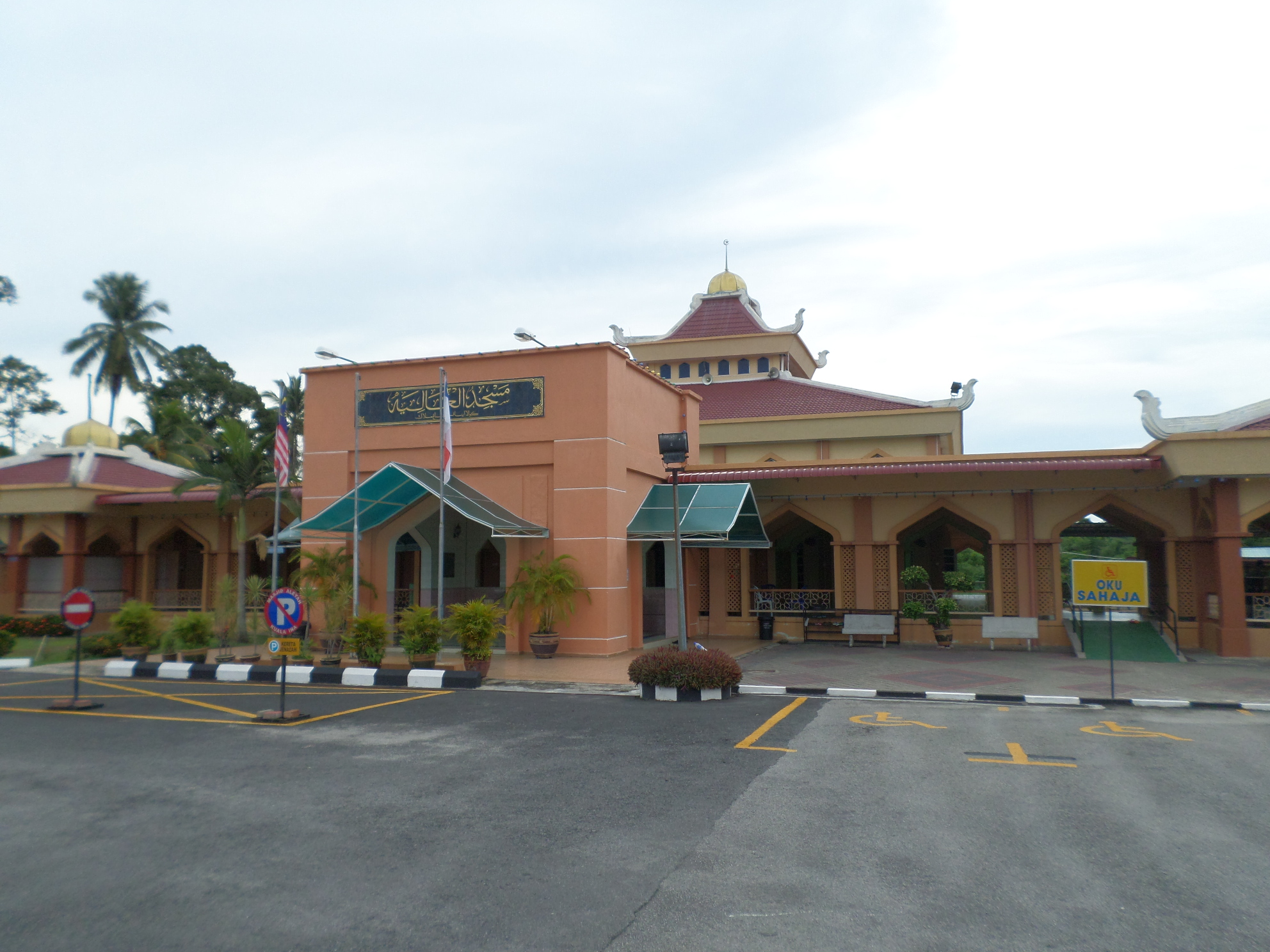
Aleyah Kuala Ina Mosque

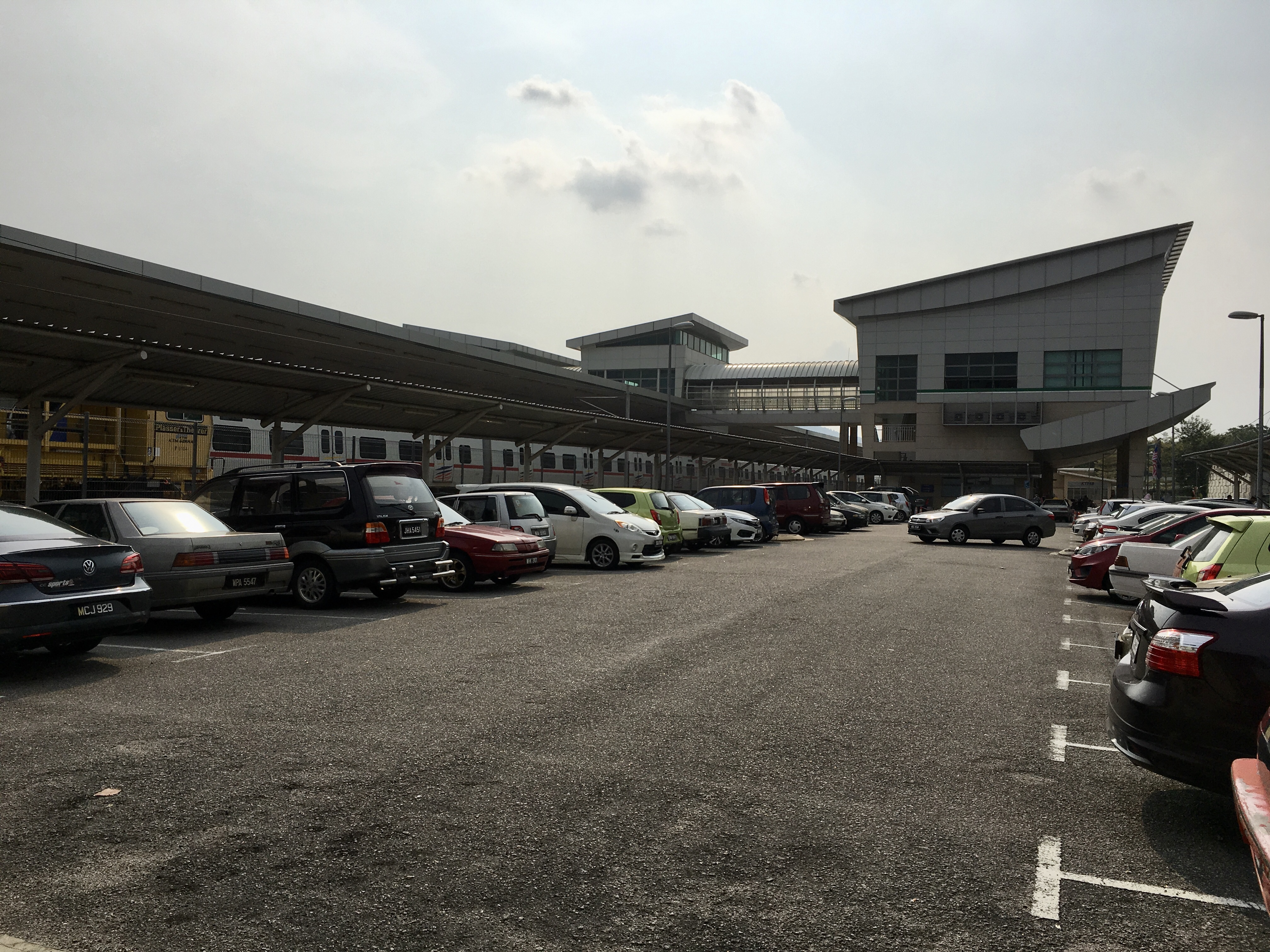
Pulau Sebang/Tampin railway station

- Aleyah Kuala Ina Mosque
- Mydin Pulau Sebang
- SMK Sultan Mansor Shah
- Pulau Sebang/Tampin railway station
- SM Arab (JAIM) Al-Ashraf

== Transportation ==
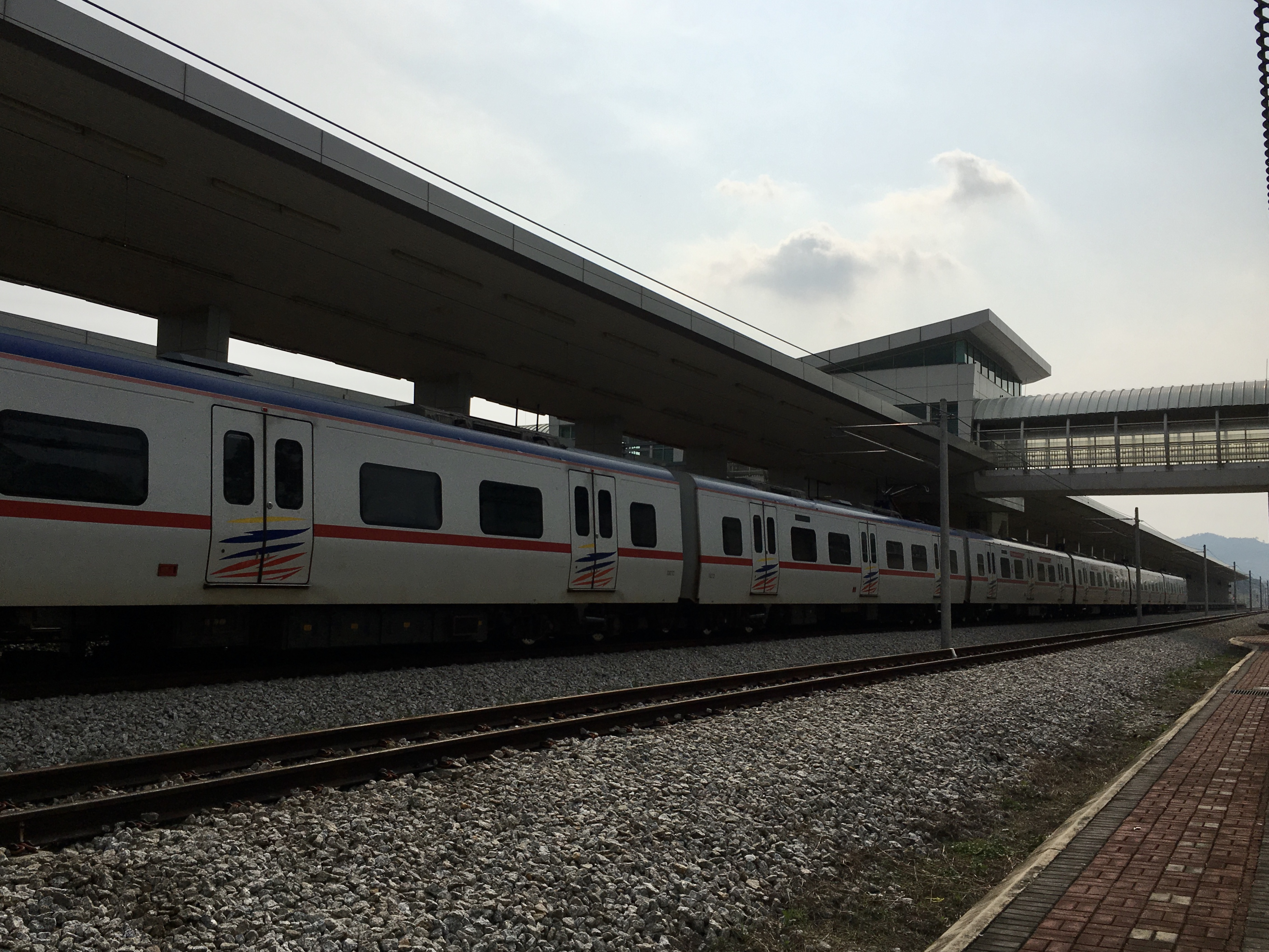
A Komuter train at Pulau Sebang/Tampin railway station

- Pulau Sebang/Tampin railway station - One of two railway stations serving the State of Malacca and formerly one of the termini of the Tampin-Malacca Line, which was dismantled by Japanese Forces during World War II. (The other being Batang Melaka railway station.)

== See also ==
- Batang Melaka
- List of cities and towns in Malaysia by population
- Tampin (town)
