= Batang Melaka railway station =

Railway station in Jasin, Melaka, Malaysia

Batang Melaka

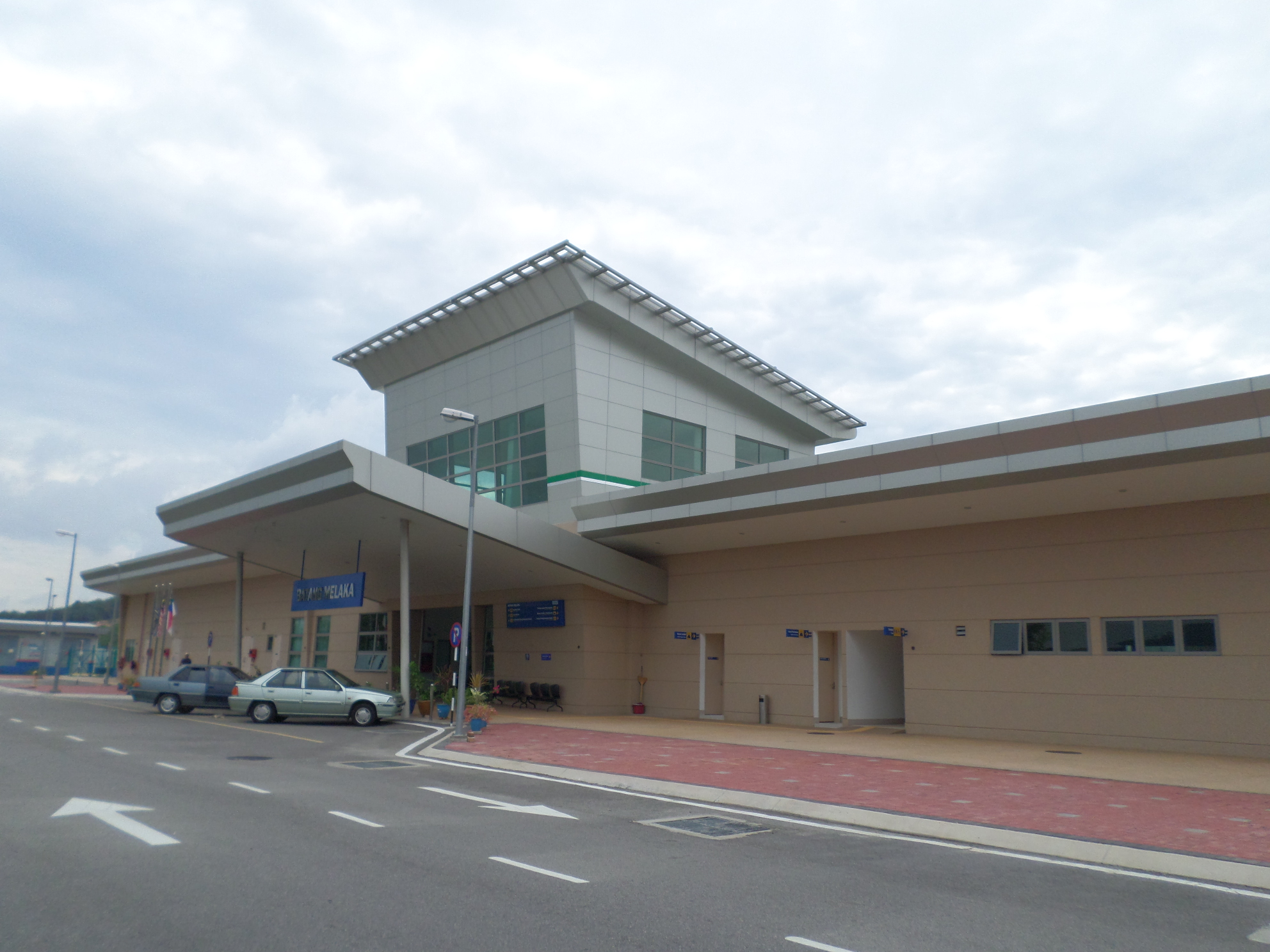

General information
- Other names: Malay: باتڠ ملاک (Jawi); Chinese: 巴登马六甲; Tamil: பத்தாங் மலாக்கா
- Location: Batang Melaka; Malacca; Malaysia
- Coordinates: 2°28′25.6″N 102°24′56.1″E
- Owner: Railway Assets Corporation
- Operator: Keretapi Tanah Melayu
- Line: West Coast Line
- Platforms: 2 island platforms
- Tracks: 4

Construction
- Structure type: At-grade
- Parking: Available, free.
- Accessible: Yes

History
- Opened: 1906
- Rebuilt: 2013
- Electrified: 2014

Services
Preceding station	ETS	Following station
Pulau Sebang/Tampin towards KL Sentral	KL Sentral–JB Sentral (Platinum)	Gemas towards JB Sentral
Pulau Sebang/Tampin towards Padang Besar	Padang Besar–JB Sentral (Platinum)	Gemas towards JB Sentral
Pulau Sebang/Tampin towards Padang Besar	Padang Besar–JB Sentral (Gold)	Gemas towards JB Sentral
Pulau Sebang/Tampin towards Butterworth	Butterworth–Segamat (Gold)	Gemas towards Segamat
Location

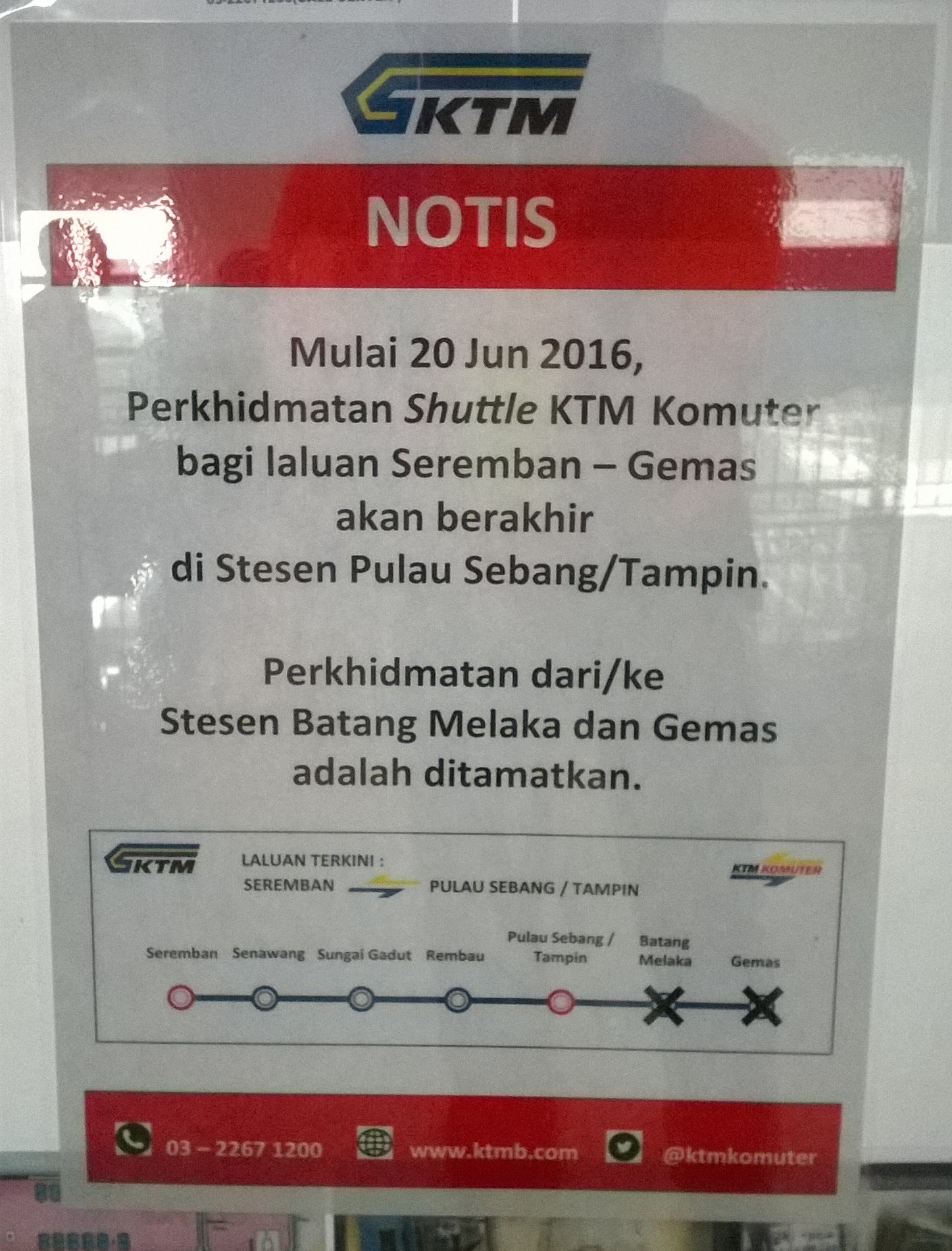
Notice of closure of the KTM Komuter Shuttle Service to/from Batang Melaka railway station and Gemas. images captured at the KTM Pulau Sebang (Tampin) train station.

Batang Melaka railway station is a Malaysian train station named after the town of Batang Melaka, in the Jasin District of the state of Malacca. It is one of the only two stations, the other being Pulau Sebang/Tampin, to serve the state of Malacca.

The new station was constructed as part of the Seremban–Gemas electrification and double tracking project and began operations on 7 February 2014, replacing an older station which closed in May 2012 and subsequently abandoned.

The station was a stop for the KTM Intercity's Ekspres Selatan service from 2015 to 2021. Between 10 October 2015 and June 2016, KTM operated KTM Komuter shuttle service as part of its Seremban Line through this station. The shuttle ran between Seremban and Gemas, before the line was cut short to Pulau Sebang/Tampin.

== See also ==
- Keretapi Tanah Melayu
- Pulau Sebang/Tampin railway station
