= Gemas railway station =

Railway station in Tampin, Negeri Sembilan, Malaysia

Gemas

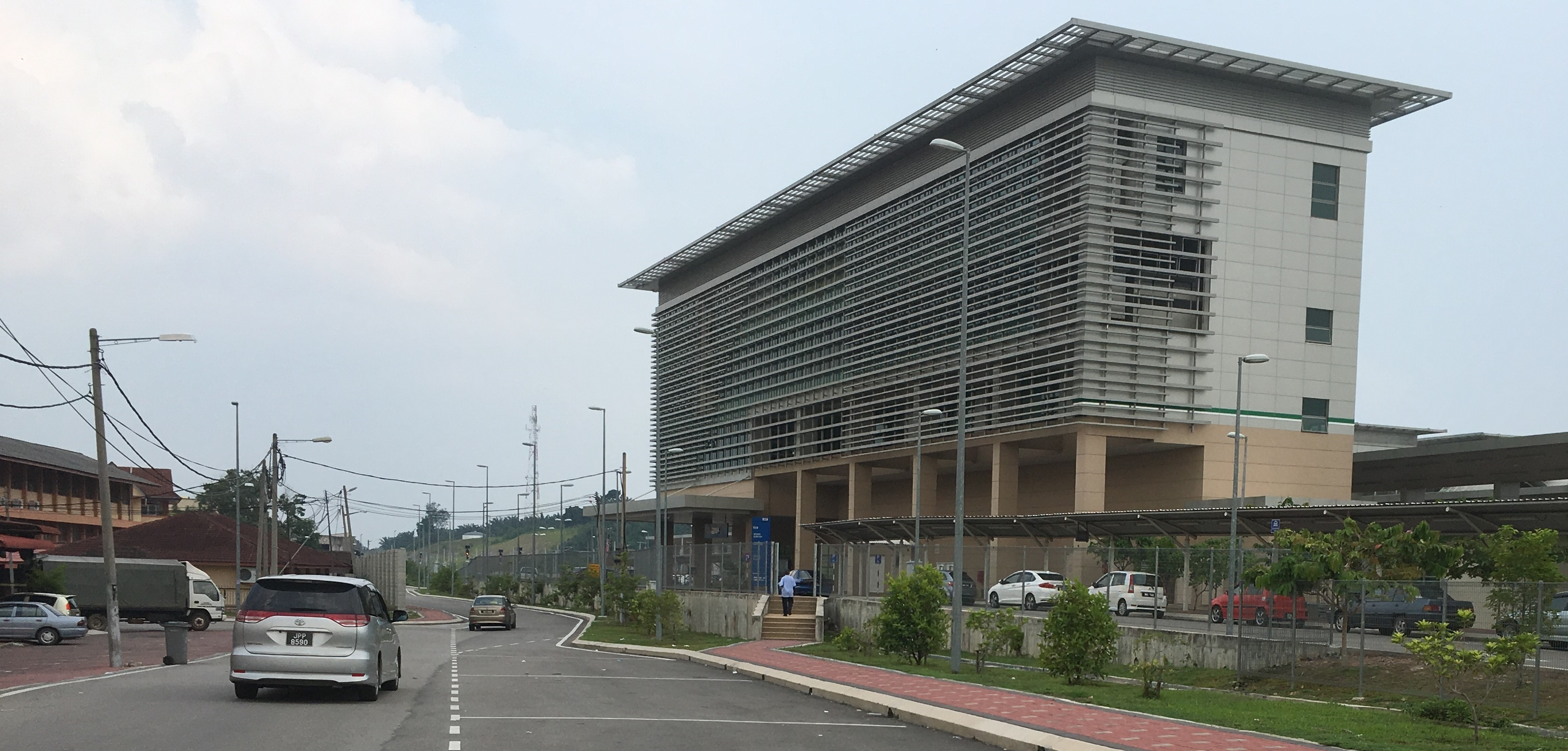

General information
- Other names: Malay: ݢمس (Jawi); Chinese: 金马士; Tamil: கிம்மாஸ்
- Location: Gemas, Tampin District; Negeri Sembilan; Malaysia
- Coordinates: 2°34′47″N 102°36′49.2″E
- Owner: Railway Assets Corporation
- Operator: Keretapi Tanah Melayu
- Lines: West Coast Line; East Coast Line
- Platforms: 3 island platforms
- Tracks: 9

Construction
- Parking: Available, free.
- Accessible: Yes

History
- Opened: 1 October 1906; 120 years ago
- Rebuilt: 2012
- Electrified: 2014

Services
Preceding station	ETS	Following station
Batang Melaka towards KL Sentral	KL Sentral–JB Sentral (Platinum)	Segamat towards JB Sentral
Batang Melaka towards Padang Besar	Padang Besar–JB Sentral (Platinum)	Segamat towards JB Sentral
Pulau Sebang/Tampin towards Butterworth	Butterworth–JB Sentral (Platinum)	Segamat towards JB Sentral
Batang Melaka towards Padang Besar	Padang Besar–JB Sentral (Gold)	Segamat towards JB Sentral
Batang Melaka towards Butterworth	Butterworth–Segamat (Gold)	Segamat Terminus
Preceding station	Keretapi Tanah Melayu (Intercity)	Following station
Bahau towards Tumpat	Ekspres Rakyat Timuran	Segamat towards Johor Bahru Sentral
Bahau towards Kuala Lipis	Shuttle Timur	Terminus
Location

The Gemas railway station is a Malaysian railway station located at the eastern side of and named after the town of Gemas in the Tampin District of the state of Negeri Sembilan. Built in 1906, the station is the meeting point of and the railway junction connecting the KTM West Coast Line (Padang Besar–Woodlands Train Checkpoint) and the KTM East Coast Line (Tumpat–Gemas).

As part of the Seremban–Gemas double tracking and electrification project, the tracks were realigned and a new station building was built adjacent to the old station building. The old station building, platforms and a section of the railway tracks have been spared demolition and preserved. The station is served by both, and was previously the only interchange station between Keretapi Tanah Melayu's KTM ETS and KTM Intercity train services.

Gemas station was previously the terminus of KTM Komuter's former Seremban Line southern shuttle service from Seremban station, from 2015 to 2016. It was also the northern terminus of KTM Intercity's Ekspres Selatan train to JB Sentral, which was terminated on 1 January 2026 to make way for more KTM ETS services.

== Location and locality ==
The station is located at the town centre of Gemas, a small town in Negeri Sembilan, and is located near the Negeri Sembilan-Johor state border. The town itself is situated on the trunk route of Federal Route 1, providing connectivity to other major town north and south of the route.

The station was previously the southern terminus of the electrified and double-tracked sector of the West Coast Line and the KTM ETS services serving the line, and was previously mostly used by ETS passengers heading to/from Segamat station, as the Segamat town was not far away from Gemas. ETS services were eventually extended to Segamat, and to JB Sentral in 2025.

== History ==
The original Gemas station was constructed sometime in 1922 as a hub for trains from Penang, Seremban, and Kuala Lumpur. The station also housed a railyard to store active motive power and rolling stock. The railyard had another function as well: a scrapyard for old, broken down motive power and rolling stock to be scrapped off as cheap metal.

Its function as a junction between the West Coast railway line up to Padang Besar and East Coast railway line up to Tumpat made it very popular to passengers as trains will stop for a certain long period to transfer goods and passengers between both routes, before continuing their journeys. Passenger intending to change trains between both routes also alighted here for their next train.

The old station was closed in 2015 as a new building next to it was built to accommodate electrification of the West Coast line and also the subsequent extension of ETS and Komuter services, with the new station becoming the southern terminus station of the electrified railway for nearly a decade, until 2025. The old station building was later converted into a hawker place and later parts of it were converted into a railway museum.

=== KTM Komuter ===
Between October 2015 and June 2016, the KTM Komuter's Seremban Line (now known as the Batu Caves-Pulau Sebang Line) also served the stretch between Seremban and this station via a shuttle service. Passengers to Kuala Lumpur, Batu Caves or Tanjung Malim were required to switch trains at Seremban. Following a rescheduling exercise in June 2016 the shuttle service was cut short and terminated at Pulau Sebang/Tampin, removing Gemas and Batang Melaka from the line. Direct trains all the way to Tanjung Malim (and later to Batu Caves) were established from Pulau Sebang/Tampin and passengers were no longer required to change trains at Seremban. However, both Gemas and Batang Melaka were no longer included in the KTM Komuter network.

=== KTM ETS ===
On 10 October 2015, KTM ETS services were extended to Gemas. The station was the southernmost terminus of the service and the only interchange station between the ETS and KTM Intercity for nearly a decade until 15 March 2025 when ETS services were extended southwards to Segamat. The service was further extended to Kluang on 30 August 2025, and subsequently to JB Sentral on 12 December 2025, marking the completion of the double-tracking and electrification of the West Coast Line's main passenger route.

== Train services ==
- KTM ETS
  - ETS Platinum Train No. 9523/9524, 9531/9528, 9533/9530, 9535/9532 KL Sentral–JB Sentral
  - ETS Platinum Train No. 9425/9428 Padang Besar-JB Sentral
  - ETS Platinum Train No. 9323/9326 Butterworth-JB Sentral
  - ETS Gold Train No. 9449/9442 Padang Besar–JB Sentral
  - ETS Gold Train No. 9352/9343 Butterworth–Segamat
- KTM Intercity
  - Ekspres Rakyat Timuran Train No. 27/26 Tumpat–Johor Bahru Sentral
  - Shuttle Timuran Train No. 31/30, 35/34, 39/38 Gemas–Kuala Lipis

== Gallery ==
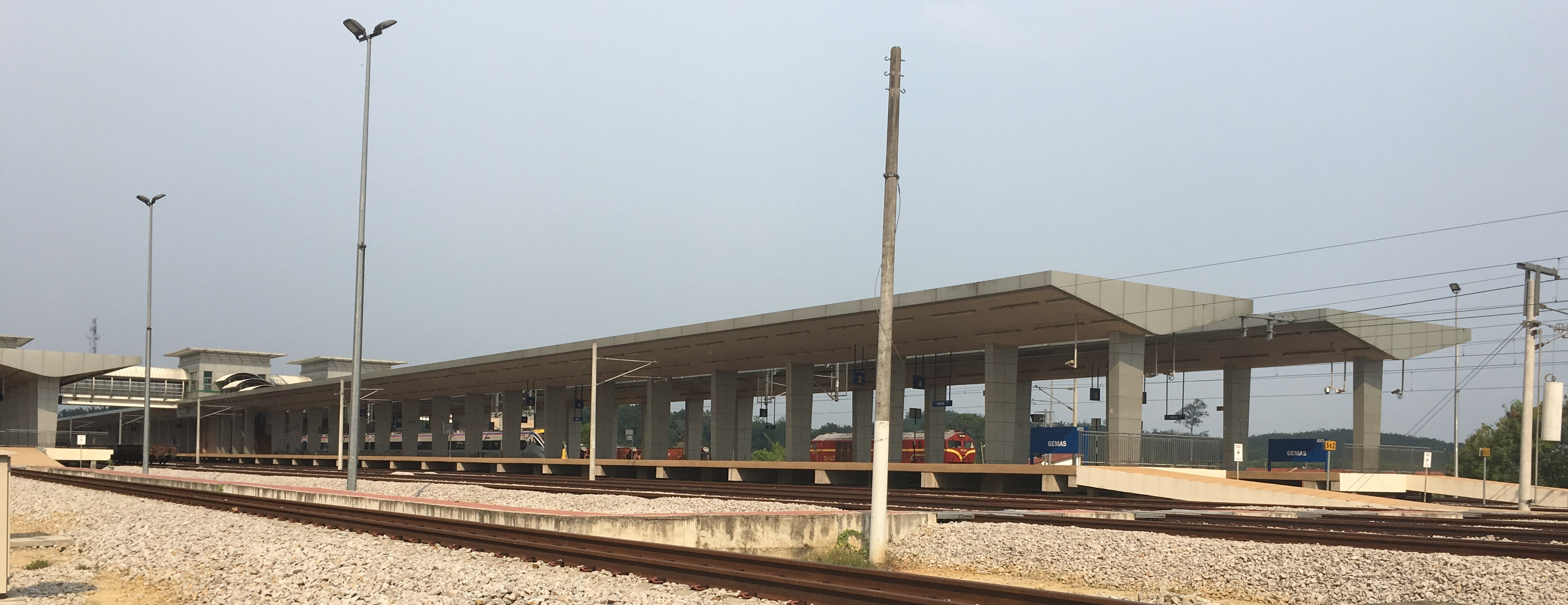
View of the new Gemas Railway Station which was constructed as part of the Seremban-Gemas Double Tracking and Electrification Project.

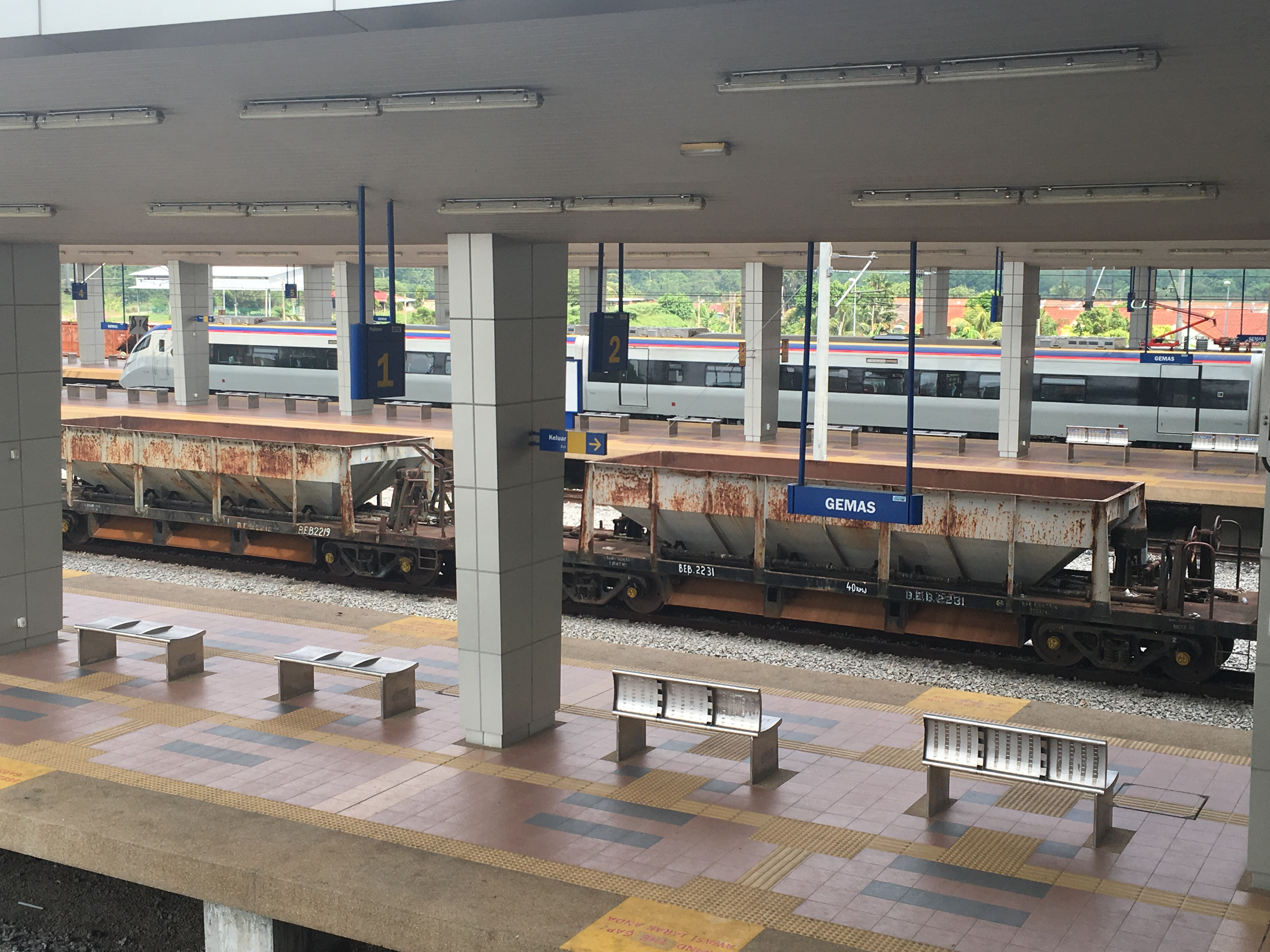
Platforms of the new Gemas Railway Station.

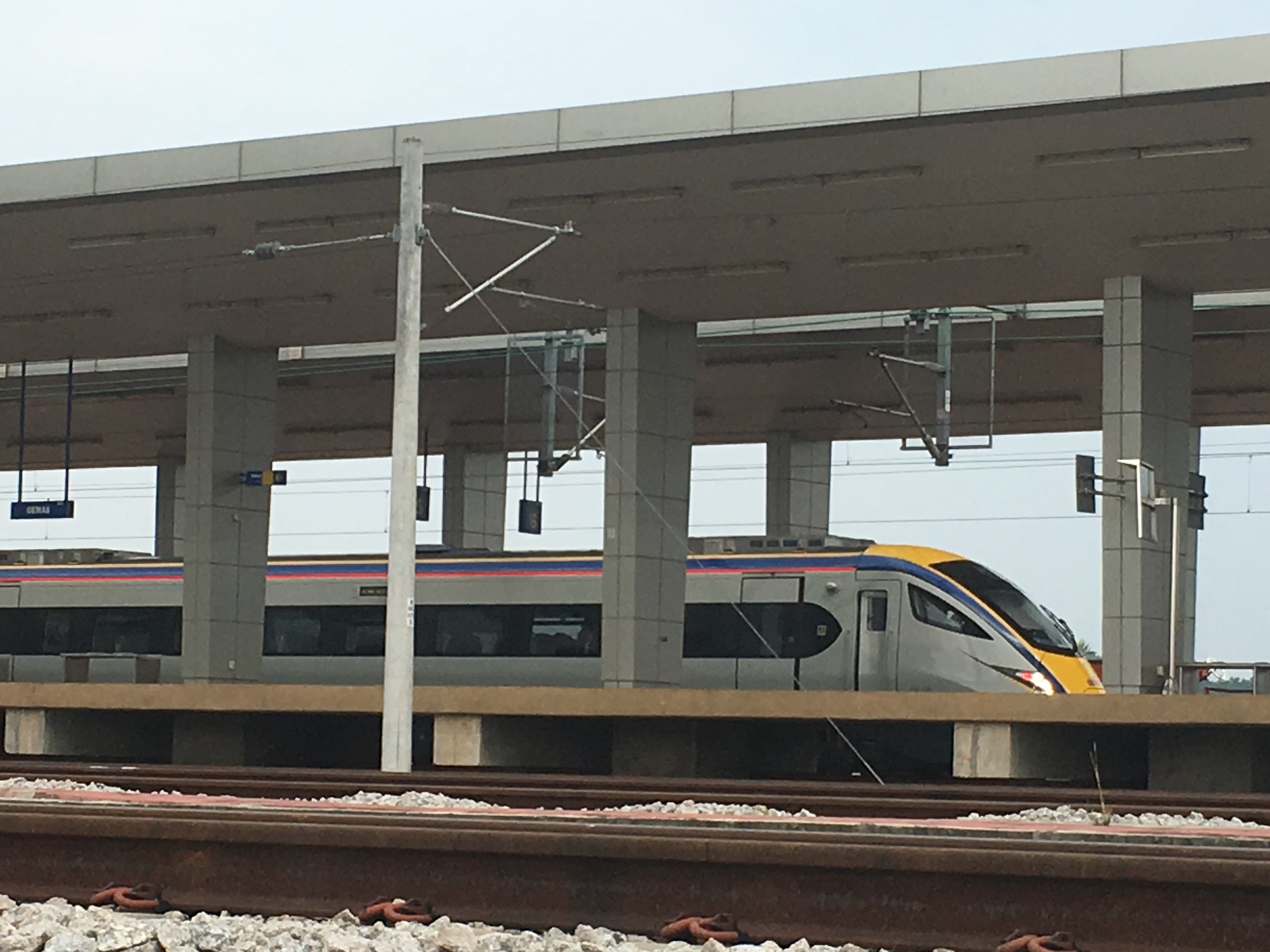
Platforms of the new Gemas Railway Station with a KTM ETS train.

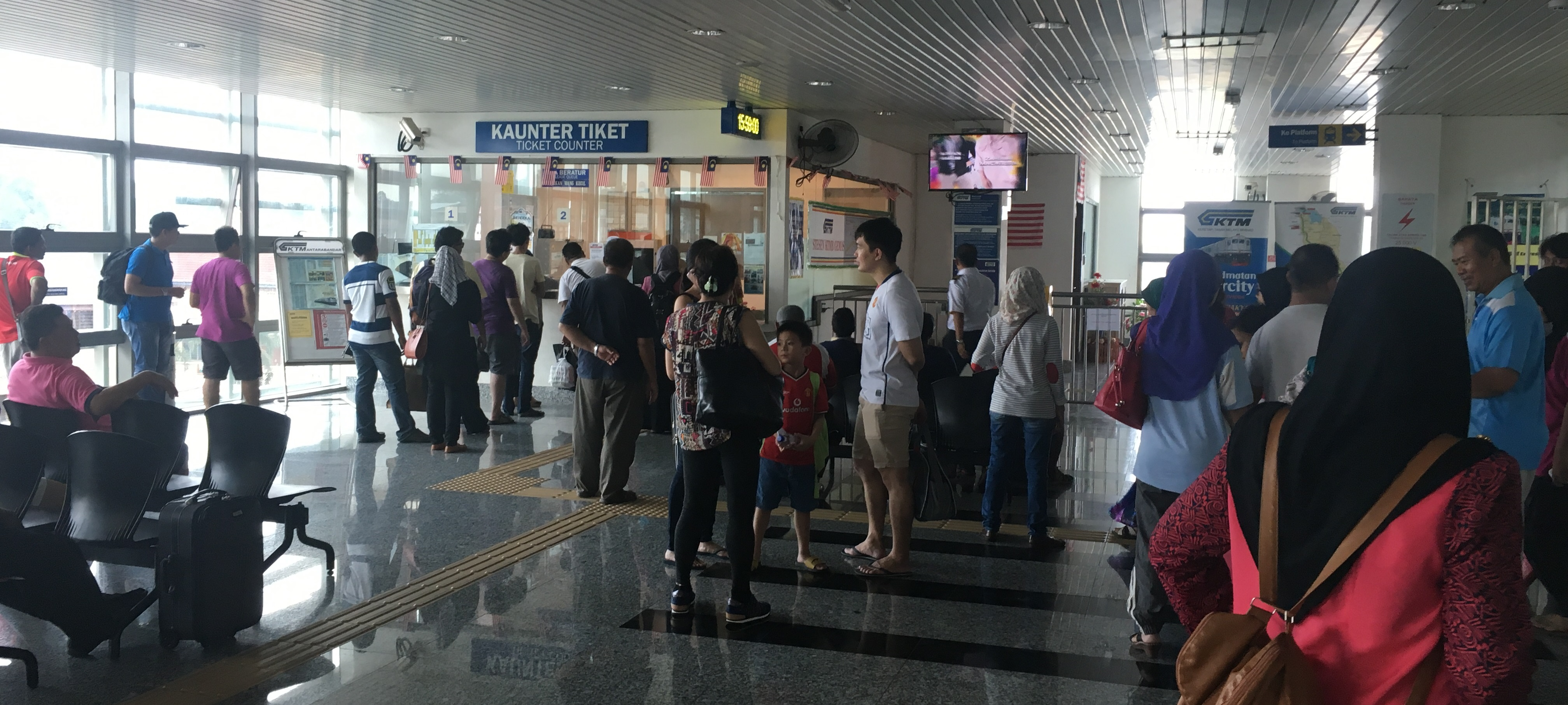
View of the waiting area and ticketing counter of the new Gemas Railway Station.

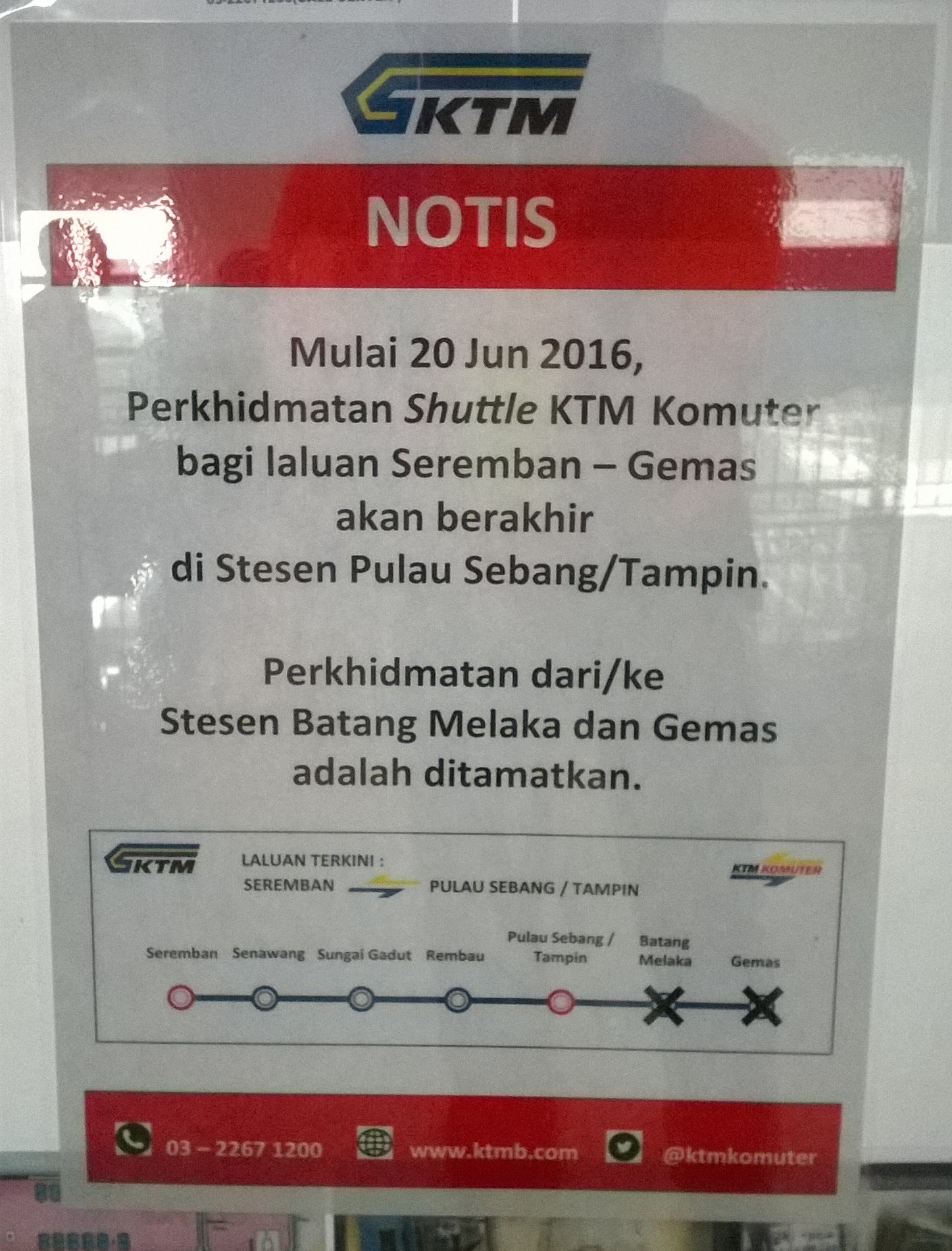
Notice of closure of the KTM Komuter Shuttle Service to/from Batang Melaka railway station and Gemas. images captured at the KTM Pulau Sebang (Tampin) train station.

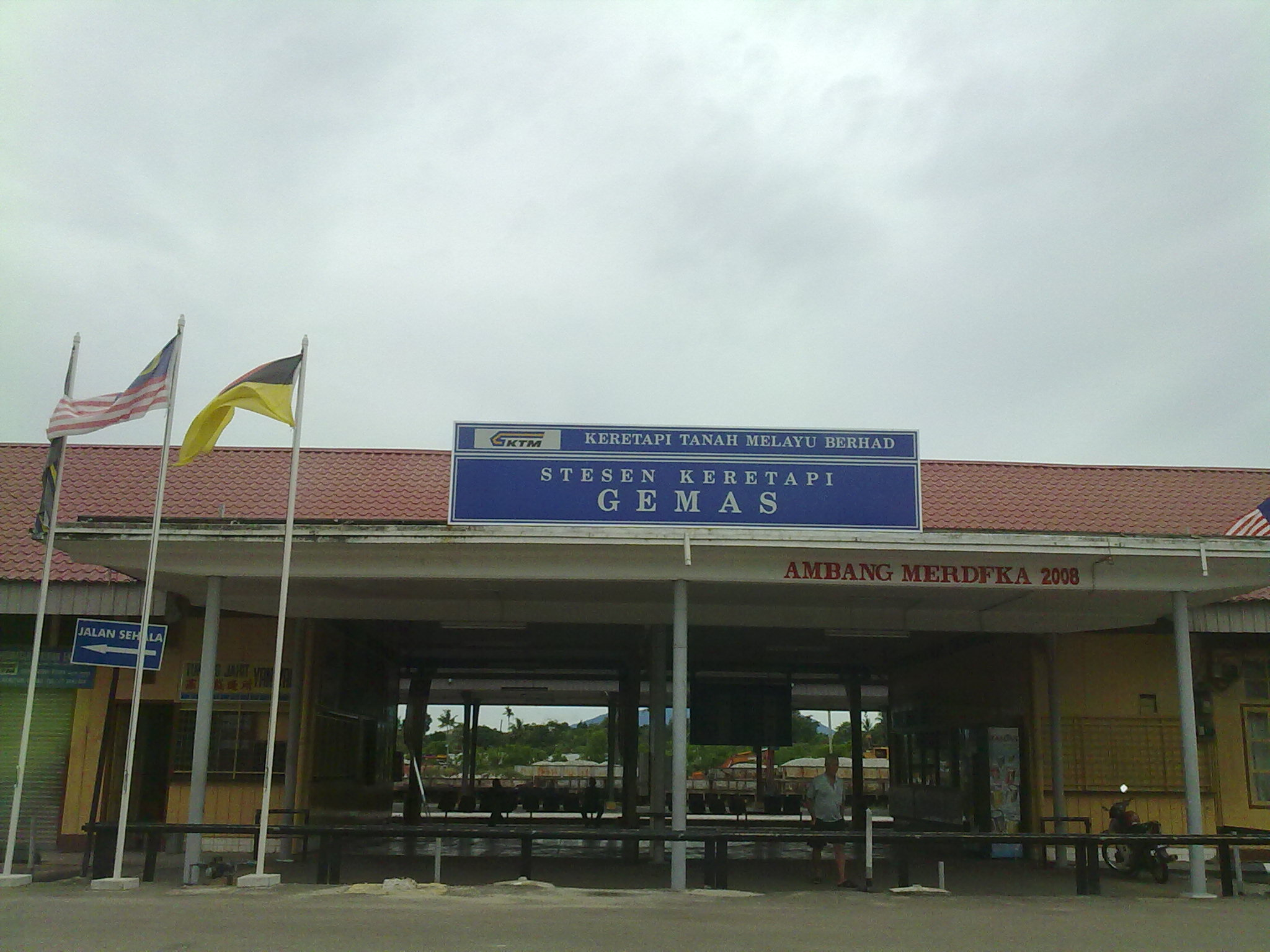
View of the entrance of the old Gemas Railway Station, prior to the construction of the new station.

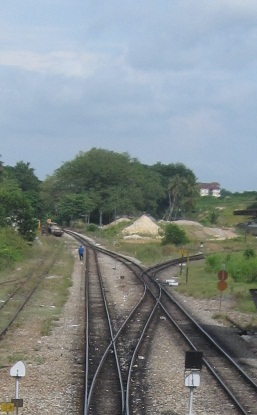
View looking north from the Gemas station prior to reconstruction under the Seremban-Gemas Double Tracking and Electrification Project. Left, the main line to Kuala Lumpur. Right, the Jungle Line to Tumpat, Kelantan.
