= Pulau Sebang/Tampin railway station =

Railway station in Melaka, Malaysia

Pulau Sebang/Tampin

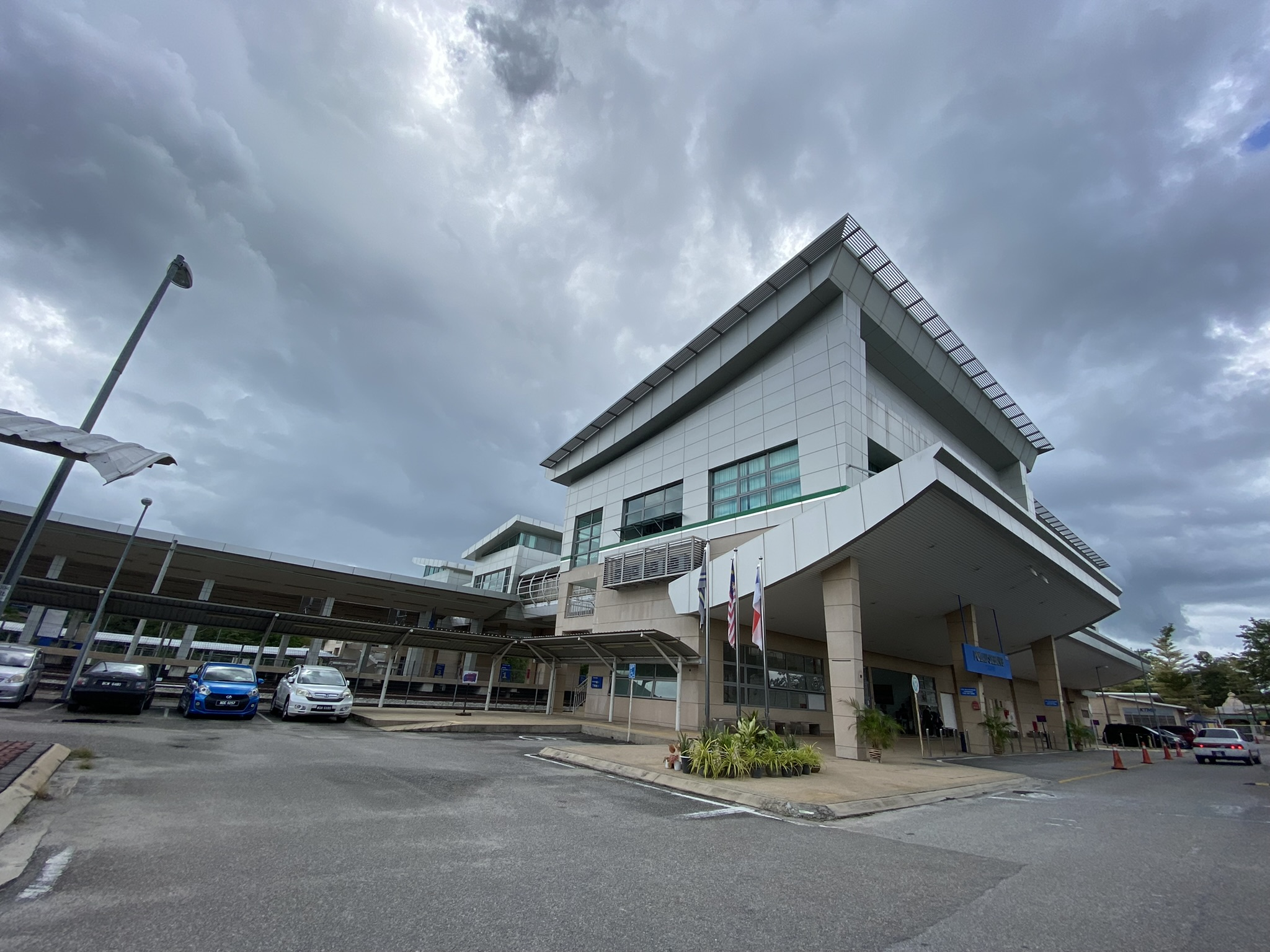
- Main entrance of the Pulau Sebang/Tampin Railway Station

General information
- Other names: Malay: ڤولاو سبڠ / تمڤين (Jawi); Chinese: 普罗士邦 / 淡边; Tamil: புலாவ் செபாங் / தம்பின்
- Location: Pulau Sebang, Alor Gajah District; Malacca; Malaysia
- Coordinates: 2°27′48.6″N 102°13′34.5″E
- Owner: Railway Assets Corporation
- Operator: Keretapi Tanah Melayu
- Line: West Coast Line
- Platforms: 2 island platforms
- Tracks: 5

Construction
- Structure type: At-grade
- Parking: Available
- Accessible: Yes

Other information
- Station code: KB17

History
- Opened: 1905
- Rebuilt: 1995 (reconstruction); 2013 (actual rebuild)
- Electrified: 2013
- Former names: Tampin; Tampin/Pulau Sebang

Services
Preceding station	KTM Komuter	Following station
Rembau towards Batu Caves	Batu Caves–Pulau Sebang Line	Terminus
Preceding station	ETS	Following station
Seremban towards KL Sentral	KL Sentral–JB Sentral (Platinum)	Batang Melaka towards JB Sentral
Seremban towards Padang Besar	Padang Besar–JB Sentral (Platinum)	Batang Melaka towards JB Sentral
Seremban towards Butterworth	Butterworth–JB Sentral (Platinum)	Gemas towards JB Sentral
Seremban towards Padang Besar	Padang Besar–JB Sentral (Gold)	Batang Melaka towards JB Sentral
Seremban towards Butterworth	Butterworth–Segamat (Gold)	Batang Melaka towards Segamat
Location

The Pulau Sebang/Tampin railway station (formerly Tampin railway station) is a Malaysian train station on the West Coast Line located near and named after the bordering towns of Pulau Sebang, Malacca and Tampin, Negeri Sembilan. The station itself is situated in Malaccan territory, being one of the two stations on the West Coast Line that serves the state of Malacca, the other being Batang Melaka.

The station is served by KTM ETS services and KTM Komuter's Batu Caves–Pulau Sebang Line. The station is the southern terminus of the Komuter line and was formerly the northern terminus of KTM Intercity's Ekspres Selatan service from JB Sentral.

== Location and locality ==
This station is located in Pulau Sebang in the Alor Gajah District of the state Malacca, and is just a few minutes walk from the Tampin town centre in Negeri Sembilan. Tampin and Pulau Sebang itself have been blending their development between these borders that any differences look hard to distinguish between the borders originally marked in the town.

Being a station between the border of two states, near a major town and the terminus of a major commuter line makes the station quite strategic to travellers. It serves both Tampin and Pulau Sebang localities in general and attracts passengers as far as central Melaka as there's a bus route of SBST Melaka bus service T20 that goes from Melaka Sentral to Tampin bus terminal.

== Naming dispute ==
Initially, the station was named "Tampin railway station", despite the station being situated geographically in Pulau Sebang, and not Tampin. There was an unresolved dispute to what the railway station is named as. The people in Negeri Sembilan called the railway station "Tampin railway station" while the people in Malacca called it "Pulau Sebang railway station". KTM also confirmed that the railway station's name is "Tampin" not "Pulau Sebang". Even after a signboard that read "TAMPIN/PULAU SEBANG" was put up on the platforms, the dispute was still ongoing. However, on 4 January 2013, KTM resolved the naming dispute by changing the station's name from just Tampin to Pulau Sebang/Tampin on the orders of the Melaka state government. But since 2018, all signboards bearing the station's name have only the name "PULAU SEBANG" with the word "(TAMPIN)" removed. This change was most probably done informally due to the KTMB ticketing system and train information display still bearing the original station name though some KTM Class 93 rolling stock was seen with an infographic mentioning Pulau Sebang only.

== History ==
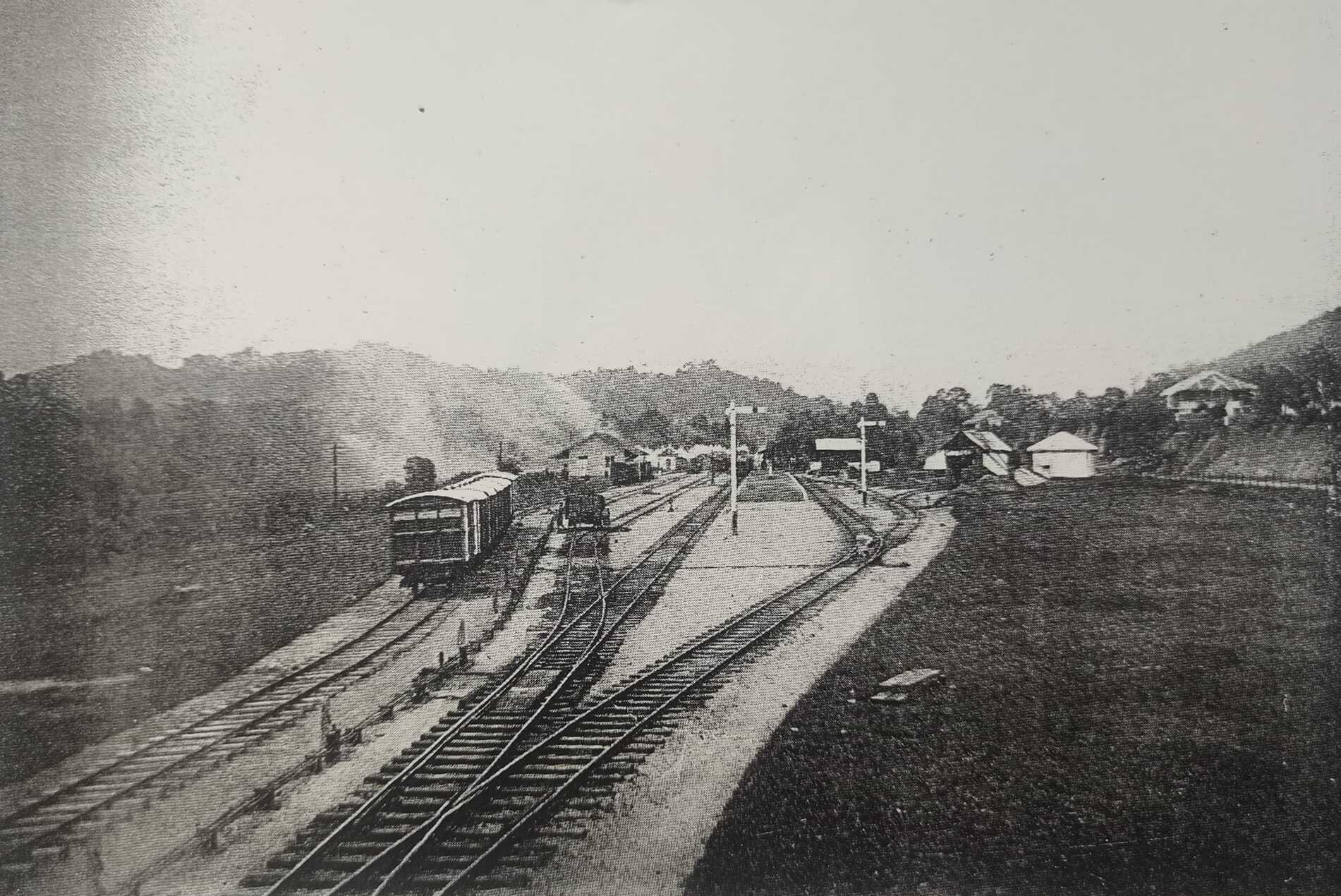
Pulau Sebang/Tampin railway station in 1909

The station began operations on 15 July 1905 when construction of the West Coast Line reached Tampin from Seremban. (Note: Some earlier sources said that the railway station would be opened on 1 July 1905, however a later source published on 14 July 1905 said that the railway station would be opened on 15 July 1905 instead. The later is taken as the correct date until proven otherwise.) Later on 1 December 1905, the 34-kilometre (21 mi) Tampin-Malacca Line was opened. The main trunk line to Gemas was only opened about a year later on 1 October 1906. The Tampin-Malacca Line was later dismantled by the Japanese Empire in World War II, with the dismantled tracks transported to Thailand and Myanmar to build the infamous Thai-Burma Death Railway.

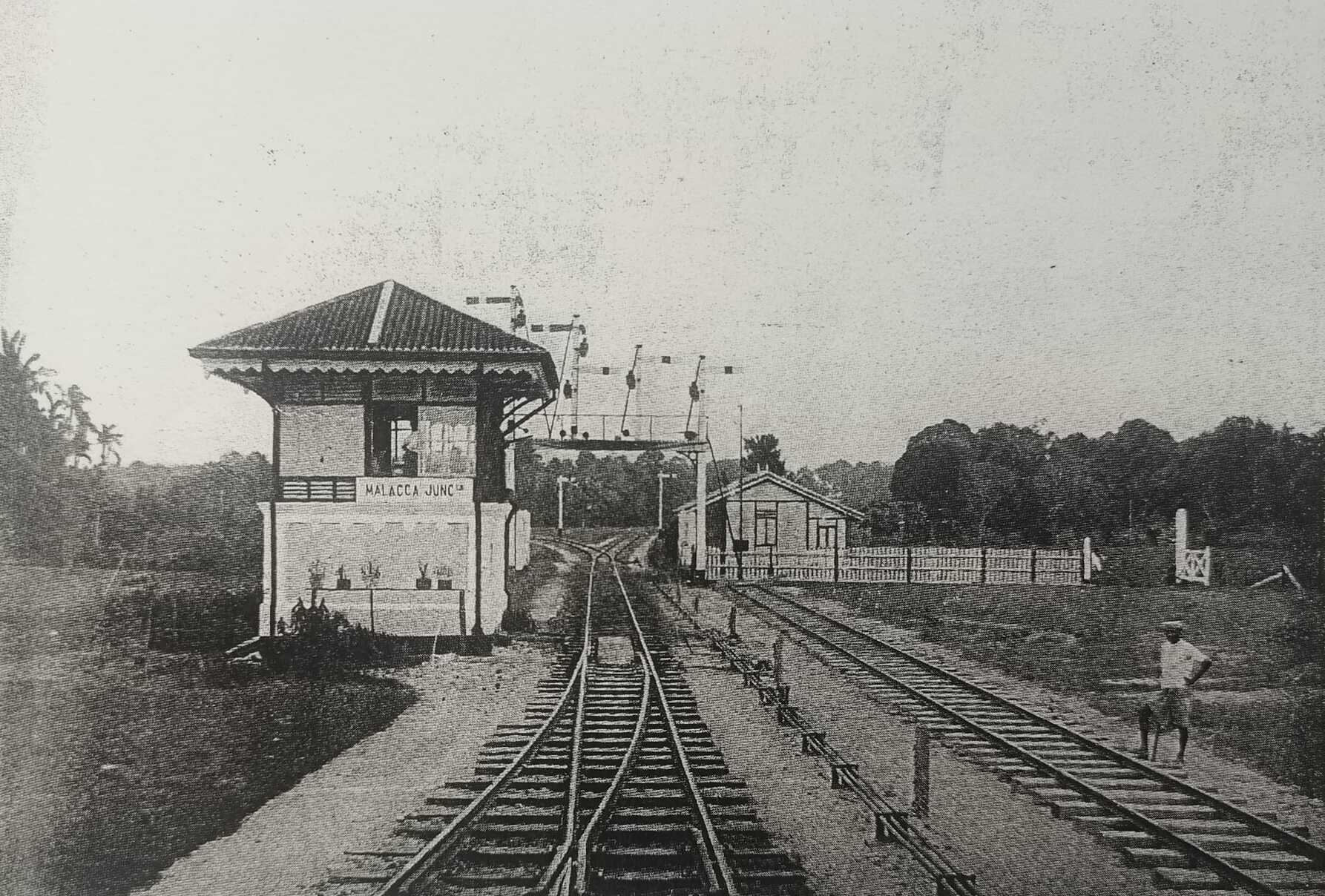
Malacca junction, the tracks heading towards the right is the now-dismantled Pulau Sebang-Malacca branch line.

The original station building underwent a reconstruction in 1995, and was then demolished and rebuilt in 2013 during the Seremban-Gemas electrification and double-tracking project on the West Coast Line. The new station building was officially opened on 10 October 2015.

In conjunction with the opening of the new station and electrified line in 2015, KTM Komuter introduced a new route, a shuttle service between Seremban and Gemas stations with an intermediate stop at Pulau Sebang/Tampin. Southbound Komuter passengers (from Kuala Lumpur) will have to alight at Seremban station, and wait for the shuttle train services to Gemas. The shuttle service was cut short on 20 June 2016 to Pulau Sebang/Tampin, removing both Batang Melaka and Gemas from the line. This system operated until 11 July 2016, when then KTM Komuter Seremban Line was extended to Pulau Sebang/Tampin, effectively merging the shuttle service with the Komuter line. The Seremban Line would eventually be renamed the Batu Caves–Pulau Sebang Line to reflect the current termini of the line.

The station was the starting point of KTM Intercity's Ekspres Selatan service, which terminated at JB Sentral. However, in 2021, KTM truncated the service to start from Gemas instead. The station has since been served by several KTM ETS services.

== Services ==
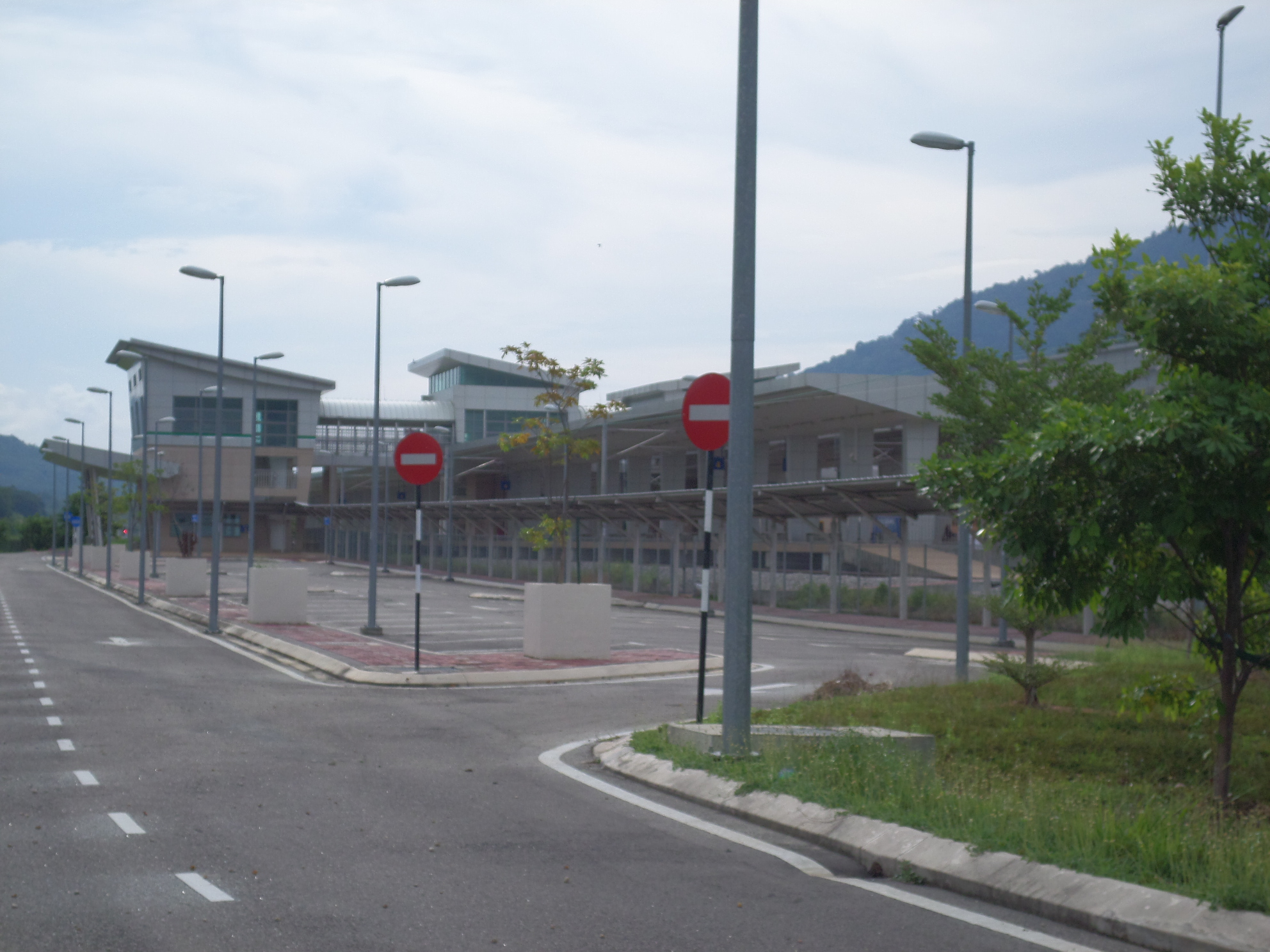
Railway station's exterior

Pulau Sebang/Tampin railway station serves as a station for KTM ETS and KTM Komuter services. Below is the list of train services available as of 1 June 2026.

KTM ETS (Electric Train Service)
Service	Train no.	Departure	Towards
ETS Platinum	9523	09:42	JB Sentral
ETS Gold	9442	10:18	Padang Besar
ETS Platinum	9524	11:14	KL Sentral
ETS Platinum	9326	12:19	Butterworth
ETS Platinum	9323	12:57	JB Sentral
ETS Platinum	9428	13:49	Padang Besar
ETS Gold	9343	14:07	Segamat
ETS Platinum	9528	15:19	KL Sentral
ETS Platinum	9425	15:32	JB Sentral
ETS Gold	9352	16:23	Butterworth
ETS Platinum	9531	17:02	JB Sentral
ETS Platinum	9530	17:34	KL Sentral
ETS Platinum	9532	18:54	KL Sentral
ETS Platinum	9533	19:22	JB Sentral
ETS Gold	9449	19:45	JB Sentral
ETS Platinum	9535	21:47	JB Sentral

KTM Komuter (Batu Caves–Pulau Sebang Line)
Train no.	Departure	Towards	Service type
2000	04:30	Batu Caves	Weekdays only
2004	05:30	Batu Caves	Weekdays only
2006	05:50	Batu Caves	Weekdays only
2008	06:05	Batu Caves	Weekdays only
2016	08:05	Batu Caves	Weekdays only
2020	09:05	Batu Caves	Weekdays only
2030	10:55	Batu Caves	Weekdays only
2040	14:05	Batu Caves	Weekdays only
2044	16:00	Kajang	Weekdays only
2054	18:20	Batu Caves	Weekdays only
2058	19:40	Batu Caves	Weekdays only
2066	21:15	Batu Caves	Weekdays only
2206	05:50	Batu Caves	Weekends only
2212	06:50	Batu Caves	Weekends only
2216	08:00	Batu Caves	Weekends only
2220	08:55	Batu Caves	Weekends only
2230	20:55	Batu Caves	Weekends only
2240	14:05	Batu Caves	Weekends only
2244	16:00	Kajang	Weekends only
2254	18:20	Batu Caves	Weekends only
2258	19:40	Batu Caves	Weekends only
2266	21:15	Batu Caves	Weekends only
