= Labis railway station =

Railway station in Segamat, Johor, Malaysia

Labis

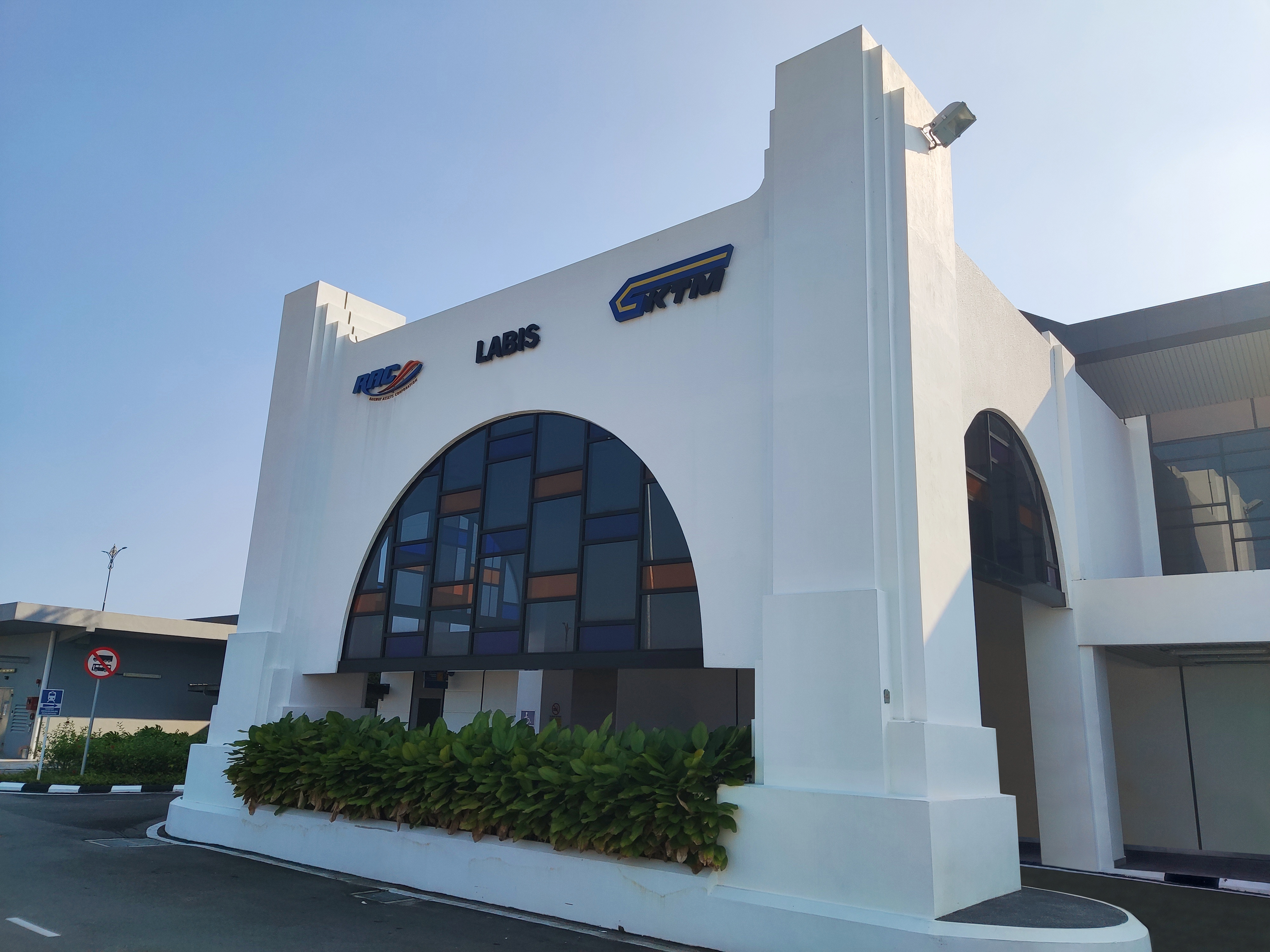

General information
- Other names: Malay: لابيس (Jawi); Chinese: 拉美士; Tamil: லாபிஸ்
- Location: Labis, Segamat; Johor; Malaysia
- Coordinates: 2°22′59″N 103°01′11″E
- Owner: Railway Assets Corporation
- Operator: Keretapi Tanah Melayu
- Line: West Coast Line
- Platforms: 2 side platforms and 2 island platforms
- Tracks: 4

Construction
- Structure type: At-grade
- Parking: Available, free
- Accessible: Yes

History
- Opened: 1 July 1909; 117 years ago
- Rebuilt: 27 August 2024; 2 years ago
- Electrified: 2025

Services
Preceding station	ETS	Following station
Segamat towards KL Sentral	KL Sentral–JB Sentral (Platinum)	Bekok towards JB Sentral
Segamat towards Padang Besar	Padang Besar–JB Sentral (Platinum)	Kluang towards JB Sentral
Segamat towards Butterworth	Butterworth–JB Sentral (Platinum)	Kluang towards JB Sentral
Segamat towards Padang Besar	Padang Besar–JB Sentral (Gold)	Bekok towards JB Sentral
Location

The Labis railway station is a Malaysian train station located at and named after the town of Labis, Segamat District, Johor.

The Labis old railway station was closed on 29 September 2021 to give way to the Gemas-Johor Bahru electrification and double-tracking project (EDTP). The old station was replaced with the Labis temporary railway station on the same day of the closure of the old station. The old station building was demolished on the following day after its closure.

On 30 August 2025, the completed new station received its first ETS services on the KL Sentral–Kluang route.

== See also ==
- Rail transport in Malaysia
