= Railway electrification in Malaysia =

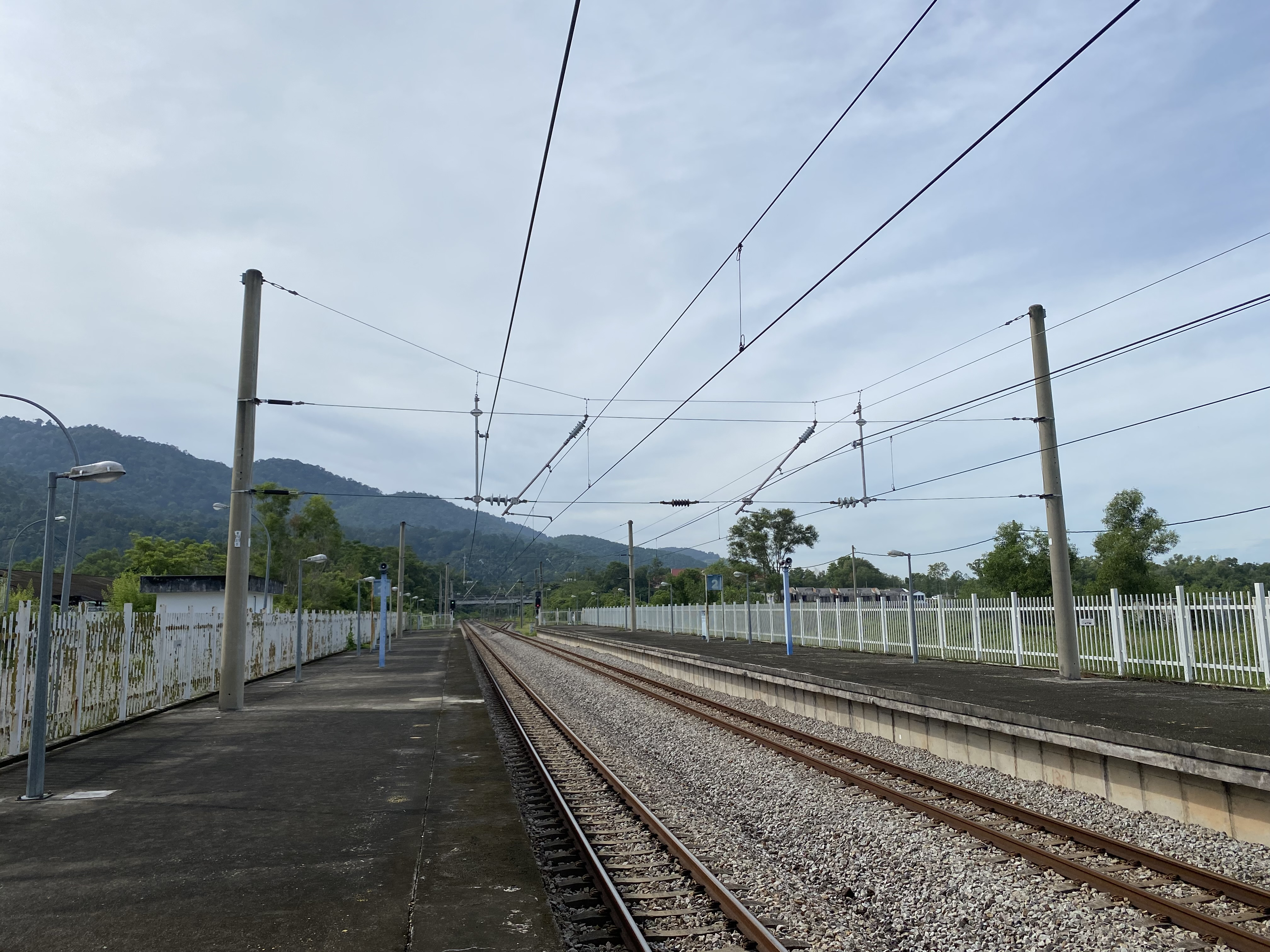
Overhead lines at Kampar railway station, Malaysia

Railway electrification in Malaysia is a relatively recent development of rail transport in Malaysia. Malaysia's first railway dates back to 1885. The first electrified railway service though (KTM Komuter), only began on 3 August 1995.

"Railway electrification" in Malaysia mainly refers to the electrication of Keretapi Tanah Melayu's (KTM) West Coast railway line from Padang Besar to Johor Bahru. In doing so, any single-track rail used for passenger service is to be replaced with double tracks. Level crossings on the line are also to be eliminated, ultimately making majority of the line grade separated. As of 12 December 2025, the main West Coast Line from Padang Besar-JB Sentral (with the exception of the short JB Sentral-Woodlands portion) as well as several branch routes have been double tracked and electrified. Two electric train services operate on the stretch: the KTM Komuter and the KTM ETS. Former diesel-hauled KTM Intercity services along the line were phased out and replaced with the Komuter and ETS services.

Rapid transit systems in Malaysia are relatively new, the first of which was the LRT Ampang Line (then known as the STAR LRT), beginning operations 16 December 1996. They are designed and built fully electrified and grade separated from service launch.

== Systems ==
- 25 kV 50 Hz AC railway electrification - Used by KTM Komuter and KTM ETS

== Completed sections ==
=== Rawang–Ipoh ===
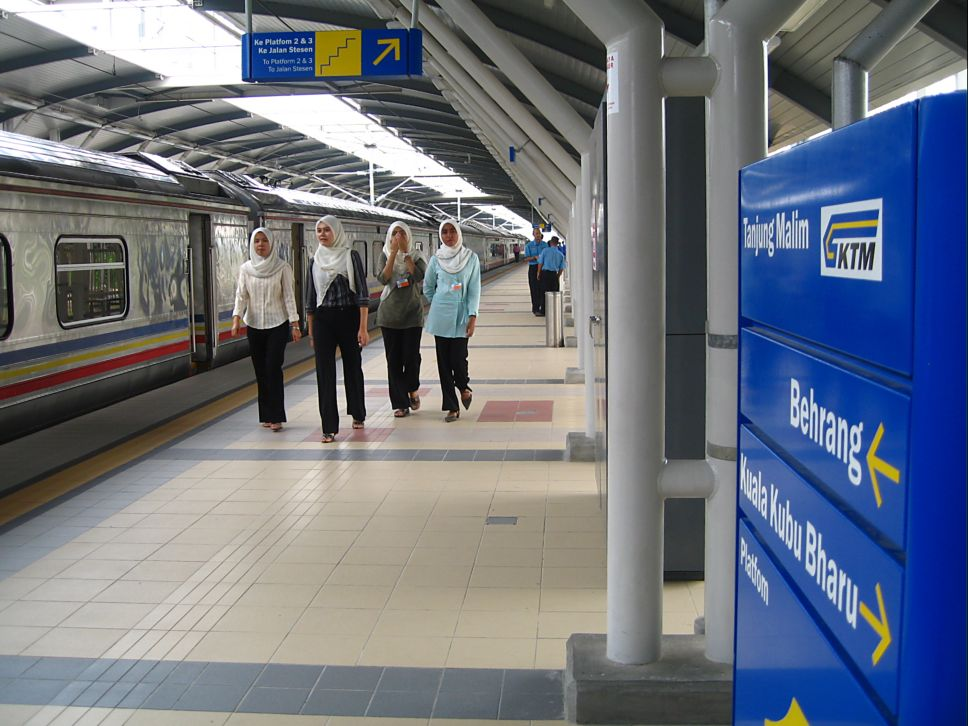
The completed new Tanjung Malim railway station, built as part of the Rawang–Ipoh double tracking and electrification project, is currently the terminus for the KTM Komuter network (Tanjung Malim–Port Klang Line).

The electrification and double-tracking project (EDTP) conducted on this 179 km (111 mi) stretch of the main West Coast Line enabled KTM to run trains at a maximum speed of 160 km/h (99 mph) between Kuala Lumpur and Ipoh.

This project, which had been beset by problems and delays, was completed in early 2008 and KTM ETS along the stretch commenced in 2010, cutting the journey time between Kuala Lumpur and Ipoh to 2.5 hours. This project has also enabled KTM to extend its KTM Komuter service to Tanjung Malim.

The infrastructure works component of the project was originally awarded to DRB-HICOM in 2000 for a value of RM2,579,920,005, while Mitsui of Japan was awarded the electrification and signalling component of the project worth RM1.9 billion supported by its principle sub-contractor, Siemens-Balfour Beatty Consortium. The contract between DRB-Hicom and the Malaysian government was signed on 2 April 2001. Four main subcontractors were appointed: Emrail Sdn Bhd for trackwork, Perspec Prime (Malaysia) Sdn Bhd for civil works, IJM Corporation Berhad for the construction of stations and UEM Construction Sdn Bhd for the construction of bridges.

The original completion date for DRB-Hicom was December 2003. The project however suffered problems which caused numerous delays, resulting in the government terminating the contract with DRB-Hicom and appointing UEM Construction Sdn Bhd, a subsidiary of UEM (Malaysia) Berhad, to take over the project from 1 June 2005.

At that stage, DRB-Hicom was said to have completed 88% of the work. DRB-Hicom said one of the main causes of the delays was a dispute over a variation order and losses and expenses with the government.

Although there were threats of litigation, the matter was submitted for arbitration and was finally settled in May 2006 with the government paying DRB-Hicom a sum of RM425 million. The company added that it was still in negotiations with the government over issues pertaining to liquidated ascertained damages and release of the performance bond. Mitsui had also submitted a claim for compensation for being unable to carry out the electrification part of the project because of the delays to civil works with the government settling on an undisclosed sum in December 2006.

The project was completed in stages. It was completed up to Rasa in 2007 which also saw the launching of a KTM Komuter shuttle service from Rawang (where passengers connect to the main Komuter network). On 17 January 2008, the EDTP between Rawang and Ipoh was officially completed. This was marked by an event where the Transport Minister officially declared the line opened.

Despite the completion of electrification and double-tracking works, KTM ETS services only began operating in 2010. Between 1 December 2008 and 2010, trains hauled by diesel locomotives were still used, running 10 trips a day.

KTM had initially planned to introduce a rapid intercity service between KL Sentral and Ipoh, running 16 services a day initially and ultimately up to 32 services a day.

Currently, there are 16 ETS trips for each direction, with 5 trips beginning/terminating at Ipoh station. The initial KTM Komuter shuttle service was extended to Tanjung Malim and was eventually merged into what is now KTM Komuter's Tanjung Malim–Port Klang Line.

=== Sentul–Port Klang extension to Batu Caves ===
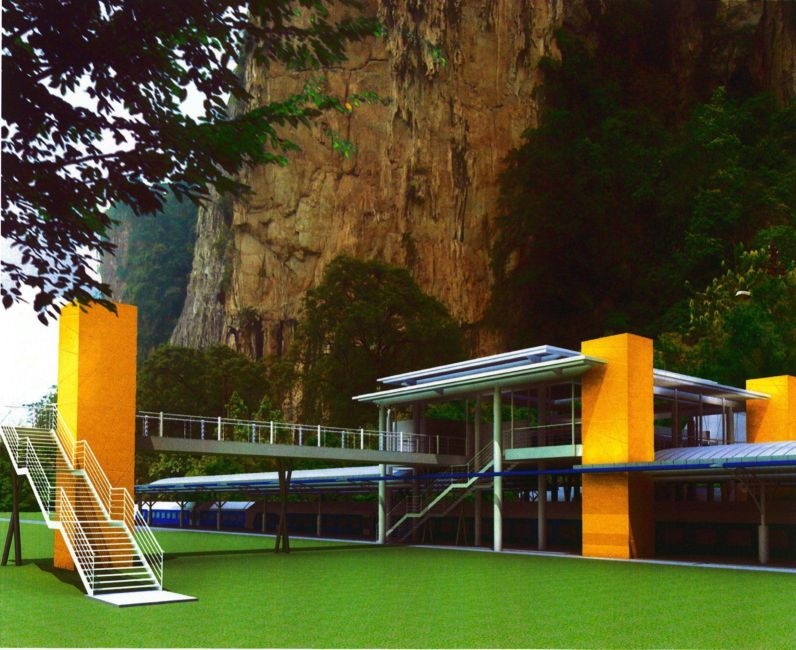
An artist's impression of the new Batu Caves KTM Komuter station which will be constructed under the Sentul–Batu Caves double tracking and electrification project.

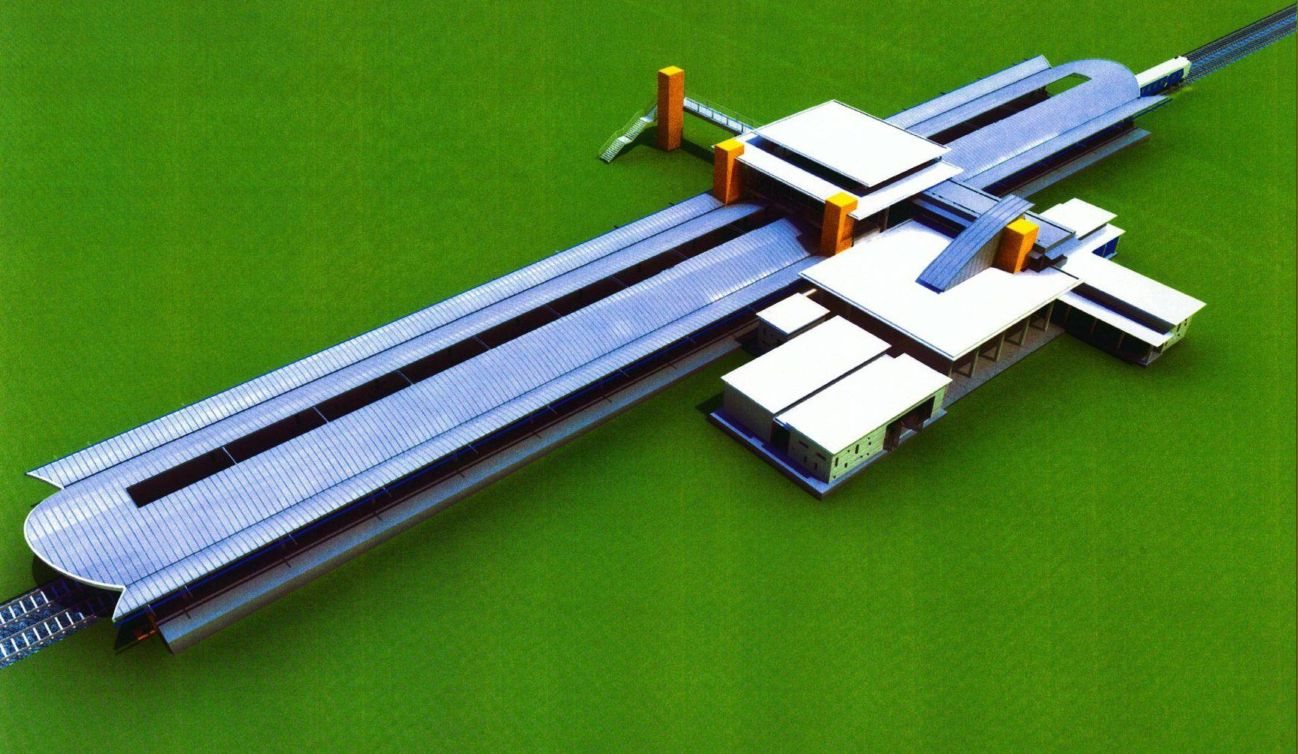
Another artist's impression of the new Batu Caves KTM Komuter station.

The 7.2 km (4.5 mi) EDTP extension to the Batu Caves branch line started at the end of 2006. The project, which costed RM515mil, included electrification, double-tracking and refitting the existing old track, signalling, communications, as well as construction of new stations at Sentul, Batu Kentonmen, Kampung Batu, Taman Wahyu and Batu Caves. Sentul was the terminus for KTM Komuter's then Sentul–Port Klang Line and the extension will enable the commuter train service to be extended to Batu Caves. Proposed during the 1990s, the project was initially given to DRB-Hicom Berhad and a letter of intent was issued by the Transport Ministry to the company on 13 April 2001. No letter of award was however issued and there was no movement until 2006 when site possession was given to contractor YTL Corporation Berhad on 17 November 2006. The project was completed in August 2010. The Sentul station is part of the Sentul Raya masterplan development under YTL Corporation Berhad.

The project was completed in 2010, with full passenger services launched in August 2010. The Sentul–Batu Caves branch line is currently served by KTM Komuter's Batu Caves–Pulau Sebang Line.

=== Seremban–Gemas ===
On 7 January 2008, the government of Malaysia announced that the Indian company, Ircon International won the RM3.45 billion (US$1 billion) contract to build a double track from Seremban to Gemas. The 100 km (62 mi) Seremban–Sungai Gadut EDTP was scheduled to be completed by 2010 and to Gemas by 2012. The project involved a 64.85 km (40.30 mi) stretch in Negeri Sembilan, 27.84 km (17.30 mi) in Malacca and 1.45 km (0.90 mi) in Johor. A 1.8 km (1.1 mi) tunnel and 9 bridges were be built in the process.

On 23 May 2008, a joint venture between IJM Corporation Berhad and Norwest Corporation won a RM490.12 million contract from Ircon International to construct, commission and maintain infrastructure works for the EDTP. The construction period was to be 21 months.

On 27 May 2008, a joint venture between Loh & Loh Corporation Bhd and Pasti Abadi Sdn Bhd won a RM273.01 million contract to construct, commission and maintain infrastructure works. The contract included site clearance, demolition and relocation works.

On 26 January 2010, then Chief Minister of Malacca, Mohd Ali Rustam said the EDTP works on the railway were 32.81% completed and it was expected to be operational by August 2012. Once completed, the travel time between Malacca and Negeri Sembilan will be shortened and new six-coach electric trains capable of carrying 350 passengers at 140 km/h (87 mph) will be used.

Part of the project, from Seremban to Sungai Gadut was completed in April 2011, and the stretch from Sungai Gadut to Gemas was completed on 31 July 2013. The line was energised in stages starting with the Sungai Gadut-Rembau stretch in April 2013, Rembau-Batang Melaka stretch in early July 2013 and finally Batang Melaka-Gemas section in late July 2013. The line was officially marked complete on 30 October 2013.

Currently, the entire route between Seremban and Gemas is served by both the Batu Caves–Pulau Sebang Line (until Pulau Sebang/Tampin and KTM ETS services.

=== Ipoh–Padang Besar ===
This project was proposed in 2002 as a continuation of the Rawang–Ipoh EDTP. Initially, it was awarded to two consortiums. The 329 km (204 mi) "Northern section" between Ipoh and Padang Besar was to be handled by a consortium made up of the Indian Railway Construction Company (Ircon), DRB-Hicom Berhad and Emrail Sdn Bhd while the "Southern section" between Seremban and Johor Bahru was to be handled by a consortium made up of the China Railway Engineering Corporation-China Railway Telecommunications Corporation (CRET), DRB-Hicom Berhad and Hikmat Asia Sdn Bhd. However, on 21 October 2003, a letter of award was issued to a 50:50 joint venture between Gamuda and the Malaysia Mining Corporation Berhad (MMC). The change in contractors was based on the fact that MMC-Gamuda lowered the project cost to RM14.448bil, compared to the over RM44bil budget by the two foreign contractors. Members of the two previous consortia were invited to be sub-contractors and were given the first right of refusal but the invitation was not taken up.

On 17 December 2003, not long after taking over from Mahathir Mohamad, new Prime Minister Abdullah Ahmad Badawi announced that the Malaysian government had decided to postpone the project. The government revived the project in 2007 when on 16 March, Deputy Prime Minister Mohd Najib Abdul Razak announced that the Cabinet Committee on Public Transport had decided to revive the shelved Northern section EDTP. On 21 April 2007, then Transport Minister Chan Kong Choy confirmed Ircon's participation in the "revived double-tracking project" and that the company will undertake the Seremban–Gemas portion of the Seremban–Johor Bahru route.

On 6 June 2007, Gamuda Berhad announced to Bursa Malaysia that it had received a letter from the Economic Planning Unit of the Prime Minister's Department that the Malaysian government had agreed to MMC-Gamuda's proposal to implement the "Northern" section of the project on a private financing initiative basis. It added that negotiations on the formal agreement would begin as soon as possible. Transport Minister Chan Kong Choy said works on the Northern section will begin by the end of 2007 and is expected to be completed by January 2013.

On 14 December 2007, Gamuda announced that it, together with MMC, had received a letter of acceptance dated 13 December 2007 wherein the Malaysian Government accepted the proposal by the MMC-Gamuda joint venture to carry out the EDTP from Ipoh to Padang Besar on a design-and-build basis for a lump sum price of RM12.485 billion. The works comprised the design and construction of the infrastructure and system works in respect of the project which was to be completed within 60 months from the commencement date. The project cost escalated due to rise in oil prices and building materials. The group managing director, Datuk Lin Yun Ling, added that the company will undertake only 20 percent of the whole project while the rest of the construction will be out sourced to various companies around the country. The project was to be implemented as a construction contract with progressive payments, instead of the private finance initiative envisioned earlier. The design-and-build contract between the joint venture company and the Government of Malaysia was formally signed on 25 July 2008.

The project consisted of two sections, a 171 km stretch from Ipoh to Butterworth and another 158 km stretch from Bukit Mertajam to Padang Besar. It was expected that the Ipoh–Butterworth section will be given a higher priority as it is a continuation from the Ipoh–Rawang stretch and will eventually shorten the travel time between Kuala Lumpur to Butterworth to 3.5 hours. The project will also feature a 3.3 km tunnel in Perak, which will become the longest rail tunnel in Southeast Asia.

The government announced on 18 January 2008 that site possession was given to MMC-Gamuda on 8 January 2008. Works on the site were expected to start immediately thereafter and were to be completed by 2013. It was also noted that the tracks will have the design speed of 160 to 180 km/h although the operator is expected to use only 140 to 160 km/h

On 8 July 2008, the joint venture company announced that the electrification and power supply contract has been awarded to Balfour Beatty group with a contract value of GBP 160 million. Works were expected to start immediately and were to be completed by January 2013. On the same day, the signalling and communication package were awarded to Ansaldo STS. The contract is expected to be worth 135 million Euros.

In March 2009, the project reached the 20% milestone of completion and three months later, it completed 25% overall. According to the developer, the project was on schedule with expected completion by January 2013.

In December 2009, Gamuda, one of the main contractors of the project announced that the government had extended the deadline to complete the project by 11 months to December 2013. This was due to late approval of the design and late handover of lands from the authorities.

The project was delayed even further and was completed in October 2014. Currently the entire route is served by KTM ETS services starting/terminating at both Padang Besar and Butterworth stations from/towards the south. The routes between Padang Besar and Butterworth, as well as Butterworth and Ipoh, are concurrently served by KTM Komuter Northern Sector services.

=== Gemas–Johor Bahru ===
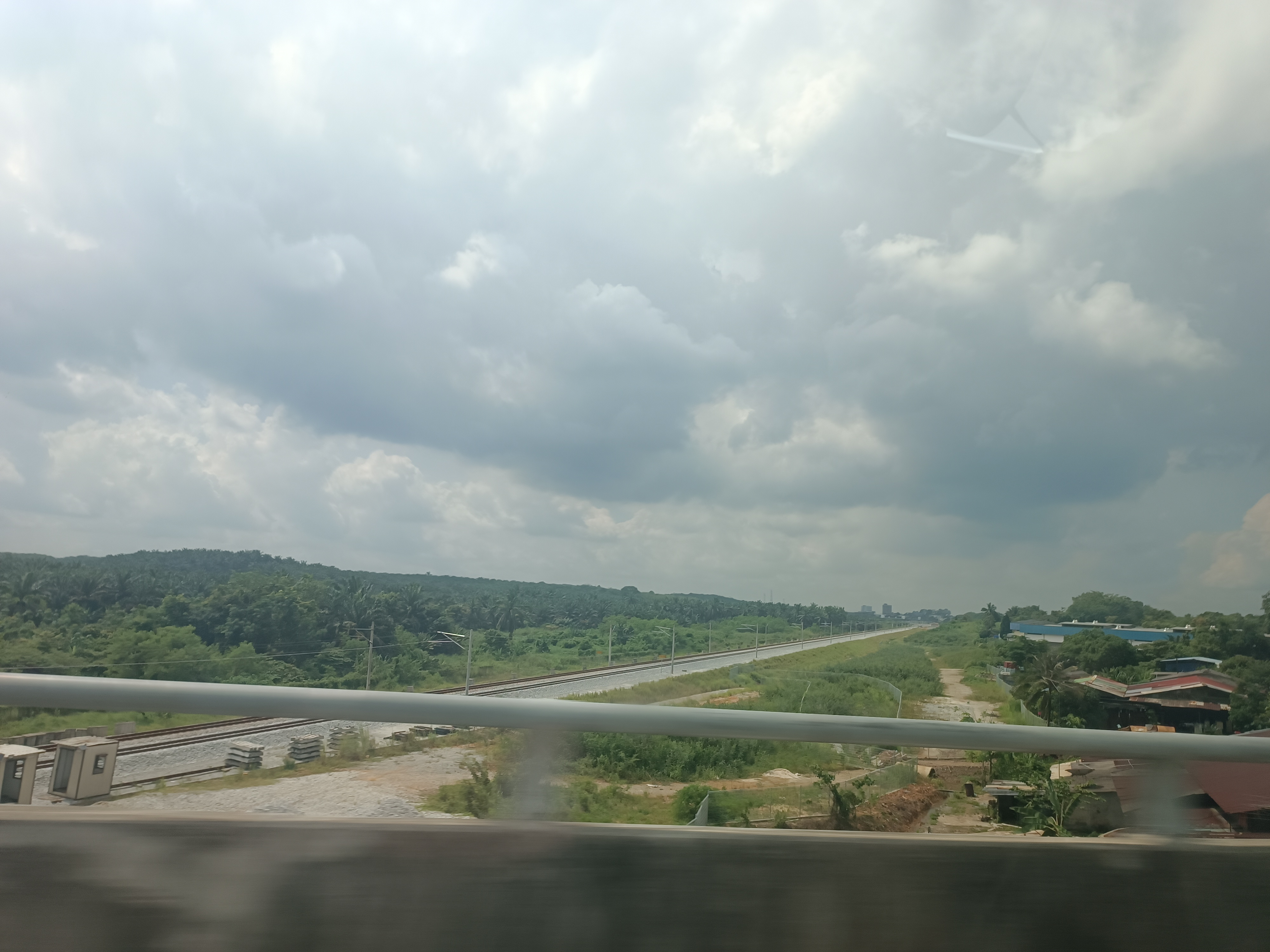
EDTP tracks near Kulai station

The RM8 billion contract was expected to be tendered out by end 2008 pending a mid-term review of Ninth Malaysia Plan. The project would include the building of over 200 km of parallel railway tracks, stations, depots, halts, yards and bridges and cover systems such as electrification, signalling and communications. This included the realignment of the line between the Pulau Sebang/Tampin and Gemas.

In May 2009, Global Rail Sdn Bhd, a relatively small contractor and its Chinese partner, China Infraglobe submitted a proposal to the Government to carry out the EDTP from Gemas to Johor Bahru at a cost of RM5 billion. According to them, the project would be on a private finance initiative basis. The plan submitted to the Finance Ministry later in June 2009 was conditional upon signing over mineral rights in Johor State.

On 29 January 2011, Transport Minister Kong Cho Ha said that The Gemas-Johor Bahru EDTP is expected to start that year. He added that the Government hoped to appoint the contractor for the project that year and Malaysia was still in the midst of talking with China Railway Construction, but nothing was confirmed yet. Kong said two consultants had been appointed, a design consultant and an independent checker, to monitor the project. The construction of the 197 km of tracks, at an estimated cost between RM6-7 billion, was expected take three years.

On 27 October 2015, the public display exercise, required for all development of new railways under Section 84 of Malaysia's Land Public Transport Act 2010, for the Gemas-Johor Bahru EDTP began and ran until 27 January 2016. According to documents on display to the public, construction was planned to begin in 2018.

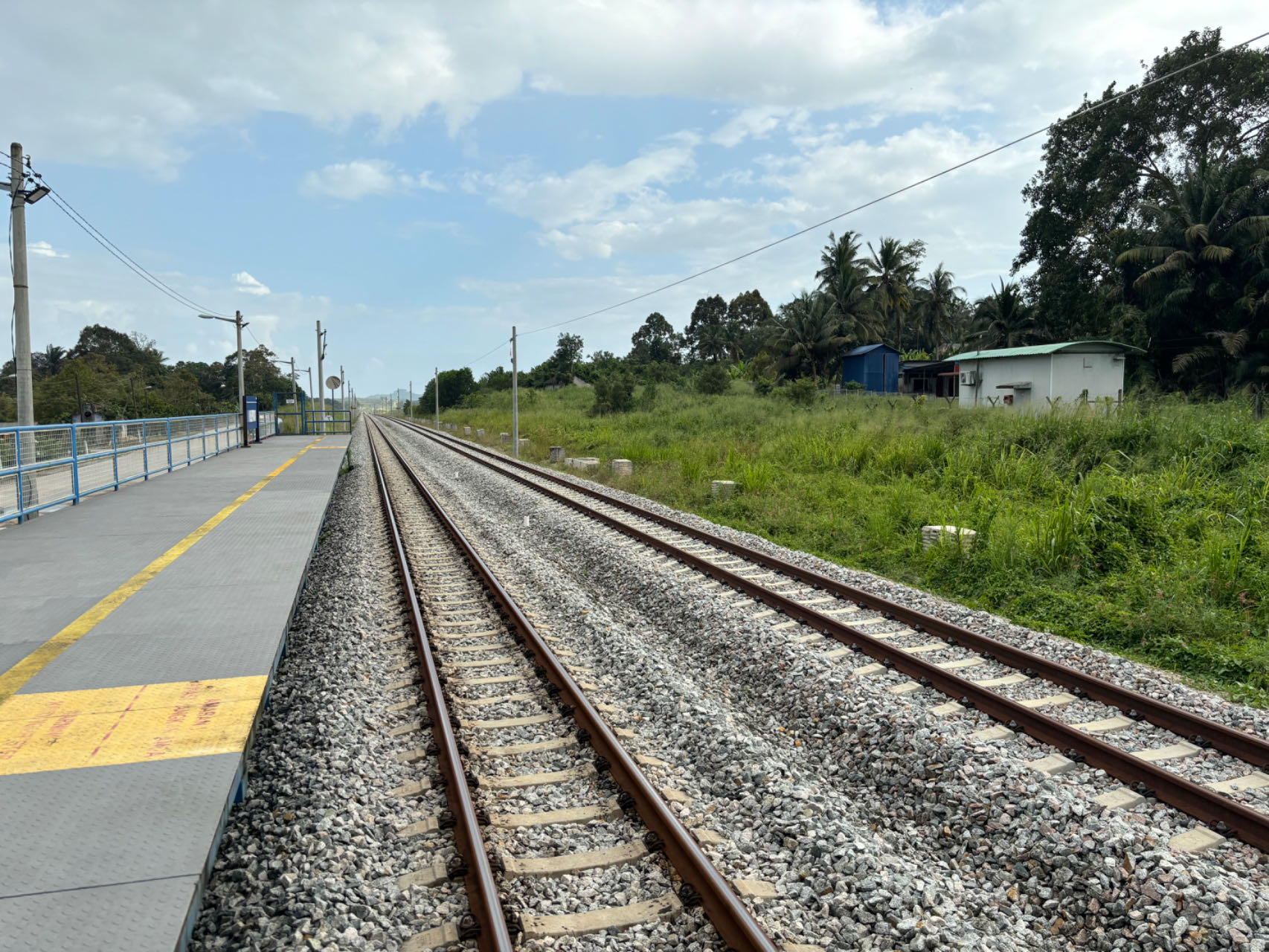
Progress of KVDTP at Bekok temporary station

The length of the line to be electrified and double-tracked is 192 km between Chainage 563.040 at Gemas and Chainage 754.180 at Johor Bahru. The project included the reconstruction of 11 stations at Segamat, Labis, Bekok, Paloh, Kluang, Rengam, Layang-Layang, Kulai and Kempas Baru, plans for 3 future stations at Tenang, Chamek and Senai, and upgrading of JB Sentral station. The upgraded line is supposed to cater for at least 22 services daily involving KTM ETS, KTM Komuter, and KTM Intercity services.

The documents displayed also stated that the electrification for the stretch will have the same specifications as that of the Seremban–Gemas stretch, namely at 25 kV AC 50 Hz single phase and supplied via an overhead catenary. Train operations for this stretch will be integrated with the Train Control Centres at KL Sentral and Gemas. The designed speed for the tracks is 160 km/h. This is expected to reduce the time taken for travel between Kuala Lumpur and Johor Bahru from 6 hours to approximately 3.5 hours.

On 11 December 2015, the China Railway Construction Company (CRCC) was awarded to conduct the Gemas–Johor Bahru EDTP with a consortium comprising itself, China Railway Engineering Corp (CREC) and China Communications Construction Corp (CCCC). A local joint-venture consortium, SIPP-YTL JV was awarded as the local sub-contractor responsible for civil work including the upgrading of all stations.

The groundbreaking ceremony of the Gemas-Johor Bahru EDTP was held on 3 April 2018 and was officiated by then-Prime Minister Najib Razak. Originally planned to be completed in October 2021, the project faced several delays due to the COVID-19 pandemic, land acquisition issues and electric feeder line issues. The introduction of KTM ETS service in the Gemas-Johor Bahru was also hit with delay due to late arrivals of new KTM Class 94 (ETS3) trainsets intended for new services on the line.

On 25 February 2025, the EDTP was announced as 99% complete. It was also announced at that time that the EDTP was expected be completed by 21 April 2025. It was expected that southern sector ETS services will start after 12 August 2025 when all ETS3 trainsets were scheduled to be delivered to Malaysia.

On 15 March 2025, KTM ETS services were extended to Segamat, making it the first station in Johor to be served by the ETS. Two existing ETS Gold routes, the Padang Besar-Gemas route and Butterworth-Gemas route were extended to Segamat, replacing Gemas as the southern terminus the ETS network after nearly a decade. Ticket sales for the newly extended ETS services began on 12 March 2025 at 10:00AM.

On 7 June 2025, the Singapore, Malaysia and ASEAN focused RailTravel Station website reported delays with the EDTP as it was still not operational and overhead electrification had yet to reach JB Sentral. The article also reported that Chew Chong Sin posted on social media on 19 May that the ETS would not reach Kluang until August 2025 and JB Sentral until December 2025. KTM ETS and Intercity Services general manager Nurul Azha Mokmin was reported 5 June 2025 as saying, “We have procured 10 ETS train sets, which are expected to operate on the Gemas-Johor Bahru route, beginning next year. Subsequently, new routes from Johor Bahru to Butterworth and Padang Besar (Perlis) will also be introduced”.

Progress was made on the EDTP with the completion of the Segamat-Kluang stretch on 30 August 2025, with the introduction of a new ETS Platinum service running between KL Sentral and Kluang.

On 12 December 2025, ETS services were finally extended to JB Sentral, marking the completion of the entire Gemas-Johor Bahru EDTP. The ETS Platinum service to Kluang was effectively extended to JB Sentral. The existing ETS Gold service from Padang Besar was extended from Segamat to JB Sentral on 1 January 2026, for the first time providing a complete direct north-south train route for Peninsular Malaysia.

== Current and future projects ==
=== Terminal Skypark Line ===
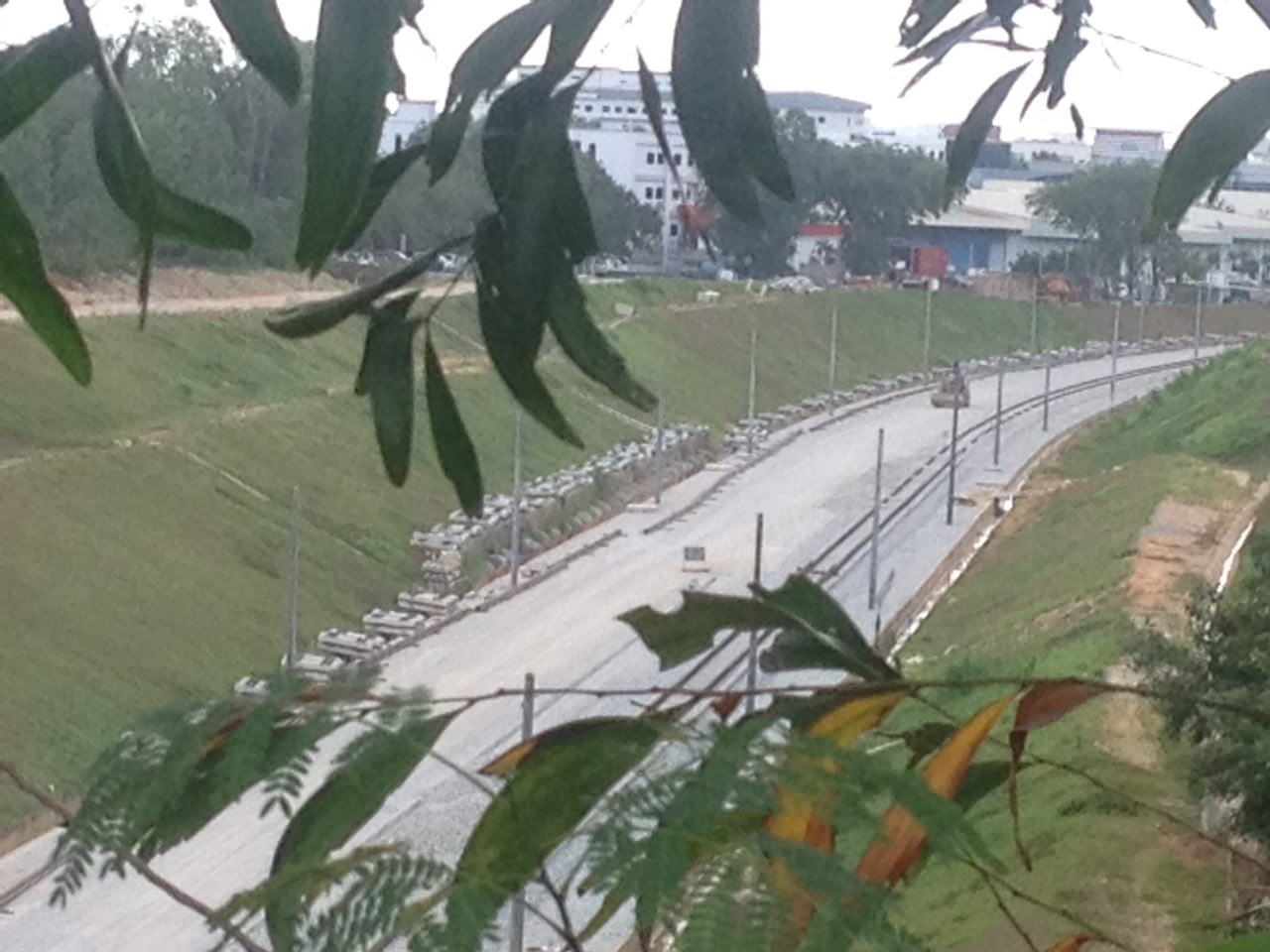
The under construction of Skypark Line taken from Malaysia Federal Route 3213

The construction of a railway line to Sultan Abdul Aziz Shah Airport (Subang Airport) consists of two phases. Phase 1 was between Subang Jaya and Terminal Skypark which had been awarded to Skypark Link-Lion Pacific. Phase 2 is between Terminal Skypark and Sungai Buloh. This project aimed to relieve rail cargo traffic by bypassing the city centre of Kuala Lumpur.

Phase 1 was funded by the Government through the Ministry of Transport to provide rail-based public transport to Subang Airport and the surrounding vicinity. Upon completion, the line became Malaysia's second airport rail link, after the Express Rail Link to the Kuala Lumpur International Airport (KLIA). It was due to be completed by April 2018.

Generally, the project consisted of two main sections, i.e. the at-grade section between Subang Jaya and the old Sri Subang spur line for the length of 4.09 km (2.54 mi), using the existing railway reserved and previously funded by Petronas to transport fuel to the airport, and also a new section from Sri Subang to the carpark opposite the airport, for the total length of 4.067 km (2.527 mi), which is an elevated rail track along the existing Sungai Damansara river reserve.

The line was completed in 2018 and KTM Komuter's KL Sentral–Terminal Skypark Line was launched, serving KL Sentral, Subang Jaya and Terminal Skypark stations. However, since 15 February 2023, the service has been suspended due to low ridership.

=== Klang Valley Double Track Project ===
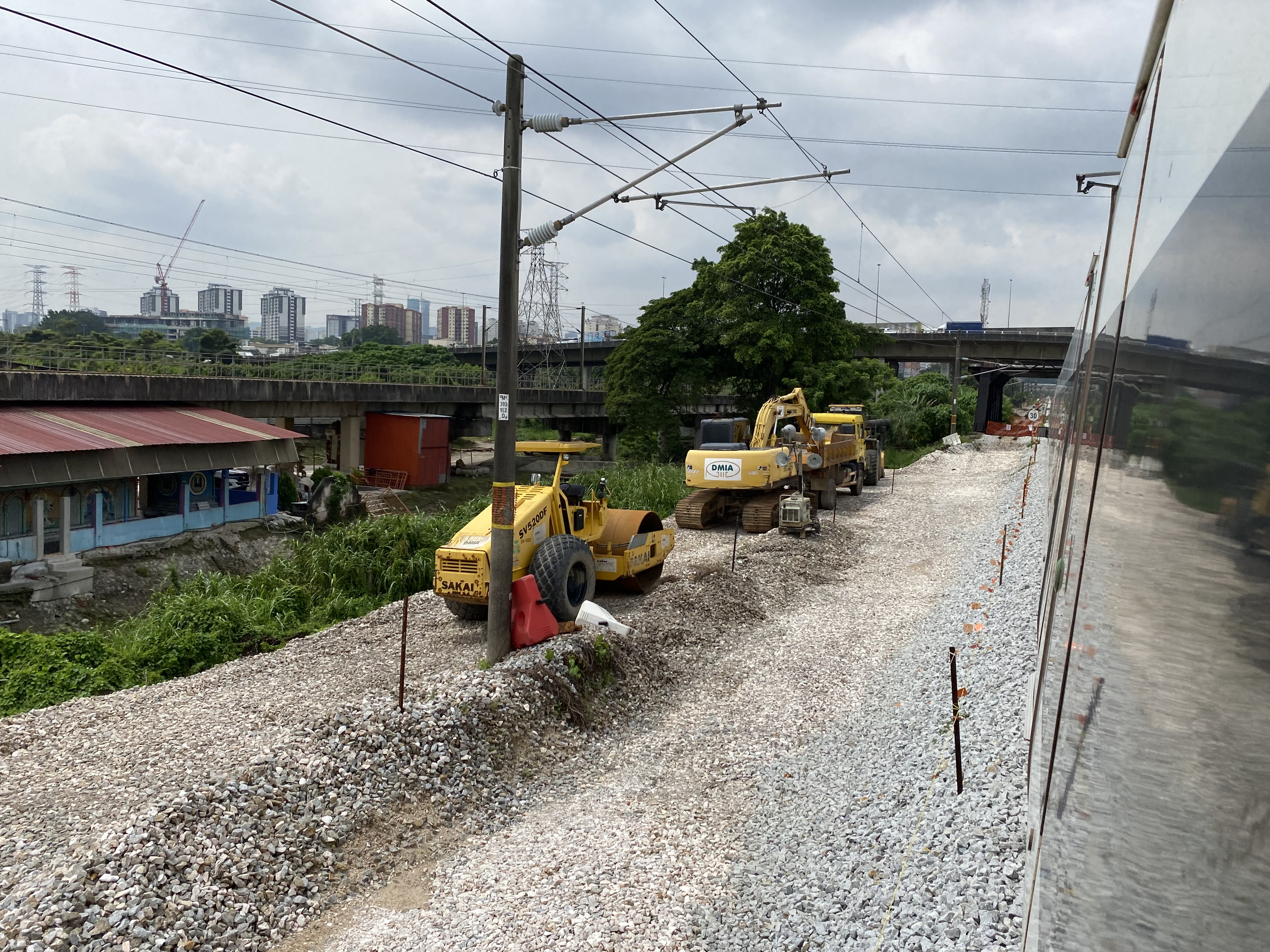
Part of the KVDTP construction site near Salak Selatan

The Klang Valley Double Track (KVDT) project involves the upgrading of the signaling system and rehabilitation of tracks and electric conducting system of the railway in the Klang Valley region.

Phase I of the project involved upgrading of the Rawang–Salak Selatan and Batu Junction–Sentul routes, spanning approximately 110 km (68 mi) and sixteen stations. Construction began in November 2015, and was completed in June 2025. Train frequencies are expected to be reduced to as low as 7.5 minutes after the upgrade works.

Phase II, along the Salak Selatan–Seremban and KL Sentral (Port Klang/Bangsar Junction)–Port Klang routes, spans approximately 140 km (87 mi). The upgrade will cut travel time between Kuala Lumpur and Seremban to under an hour, down from 70 minutes before the start of the upgrade works. Construction began in February 2023, and is scheduled to be completed by the end of 2027.

== Other railway sections ==
=== Johor Bahru–Woodlands ===
There are no plans to electrify or double-track the Shuttle Tebrau line between Johor Bahru and Woodlands, Singapore. The line will be decommissioned by June 2027, following the opening of the RTS Link in January that same year.

=== East Coast line ===
There are no plans to electrify or double-track the KTM East Coast Line. However, the upcoming MRL East Coast Rail Link will provide an electrified and double-tracked alternative to serve the east coast.

=== Sabah State Railway ===
There are no plans to electrify or double-track the Sabah State Railway.

== See also ==
- Keretapi Tanah Melayu
  - KTM Intercity and KTM ETS
    - KTM West Coast railway line
    - KTM East Coast railway line
  - KTM Komuter
    - Batu Caves–Pulau Sebang Line
    - Tanjung Malim–Port Klang Line
    - KL Sentral–Terminal Skypark Line]
    - Northern Sector
- Rail transport in Malaysia
- Railway electrification in Malaysia
- Public transport in Kuala Lumpur
- Johor Bahru–Singapore Rapid Transit System
- Southern Line (Thailand)
