= Segamat railway station =

Railway station in Segamat, Johor, Malaysia

Segamat

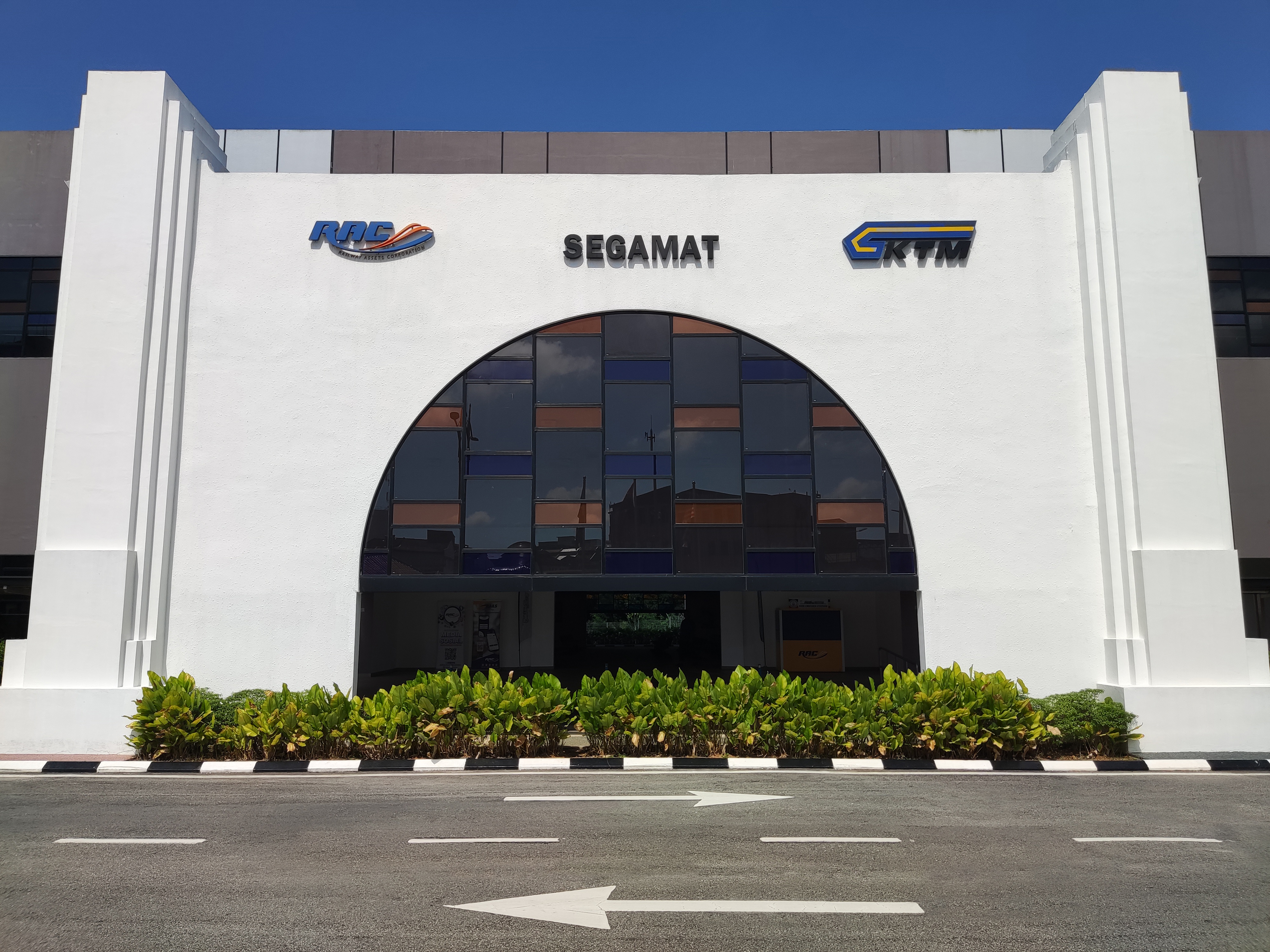
- Facade of Segamat railway station

General information
- Other names: Malay: سڬامت (Jawi); Chinese: 昔加末; Tamil: சிகாமட்
- Location: Segamat, Segamat District; Johor; Malaysia
- Coordinates: 2.50698°N 102.81412°E
- Owner: Railway Assets Corporation
- Operator: Keretapi Tanah Melayu
- Line: West Coast Line
- Platforms: 2 side platforms
- Tracks: 2
- Connections: Local transportation

Construction
- Structure type: Elevated
- Parking: Available, free.
- Accessible: Yes

History
- Opened: 1 March 1908; 118 years ago
- Rebuilt: 1 June 2023; 3 years ago
- Electrified: 2024

Services
Preceding station	ETS	Following station
Gemas towards KL Sentral	KL Sentral–JB Sentral (Platinum)	Labis towards JB Sentral
Gemas towards Padang Besar	Padang Besar–JB Sentral (Platinum)	Labis towards JB Sentral
Gemas towards Butterworth	Butterworth–JB Sentral (Platinum)	Labis towards JB Sentral
Gemas towards Padang Besar	Padang Besar–JB Sentral (Gold)	Labis towards JB Sentral
Gemas towards Butterworth	Butterworth–Segamat (Gold)	Terminus
Preceding station	Keretapi Tanah Melayu (Intercity)	Following station
Gemas towards Tumpat	Ekspres Rakyat Timuran	Kluang towards Johor Bahru Sentral
Location

The Segamat railway station is a Malaysian train station located at and named after the town of Segamat, in the Segamat District of the state of Johor. Operated by Keretapi Tanah Melayu (KTM), the station is served by KTM ETS and KTM Intercity train services. Adjacent to the railway station is the main bus and taxi terminal of Segamat.

== History ==
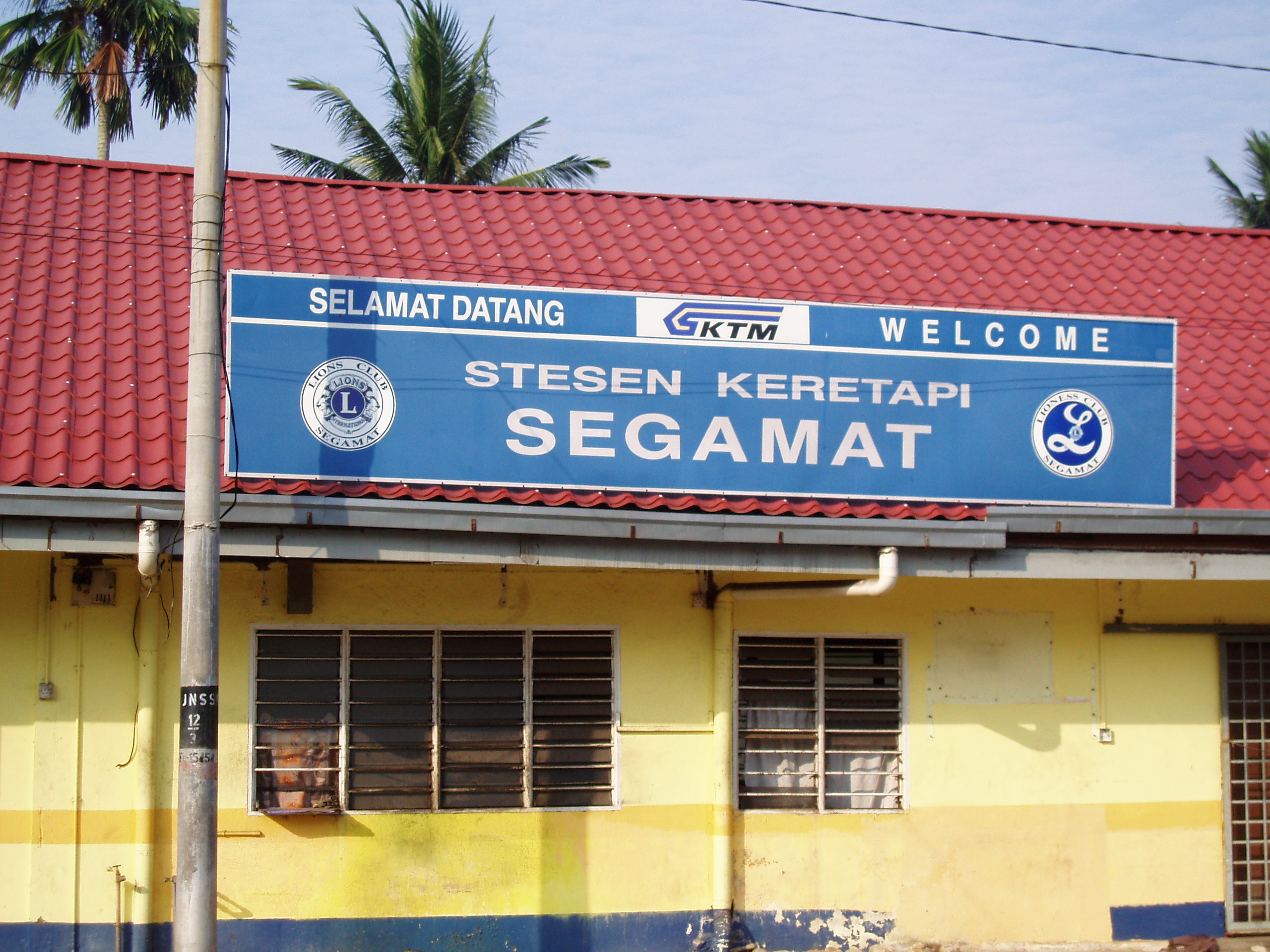
The old railway station

The Segamat Railway Station traces its origins to 1908 when the West Coast railway line was extended from Gemas to Segamat. The original wooden station was constructed at a cost of $10,000. In 1924, the station underwent expansion and was rebuilt into a larger structure. On 23 December 2002, a fire destroyed part of the station office complex. During reconstruction, salvageable structures were preserved while damaged sections were rebuilt using brick materials. Located in the town center, the station served not only as a transport hub but also became a popular night gathering spot for locals, famous for its nasi lemak (coconut milk rice) that became part of collective memory for generations.

In October 2020, the old station was demolished for reconstruction under the Gemas-Johor Bahru double tracking and electrification project (EDTP). Train services were temporarily relocated on 28 April 2021 to a temporary container station in Kampung Sedeng, 3.7 km away near the Bukit Siput Village (Red Signboard) junction. The temporary station features a 150-meter platform, 40 parking spaces, and basic amenities.

The new elevated station, designed to mitigate flood risks, completed main construction in 2023. After signaling system tests by KTM, it officially commenced operations on 15 May 2024 at 7:00 AM. This development eliminated three railway crossings in Segamat city centre, while retaining crossings at Gemas Bahru and Tenang stations.

== Services ==
Since 15 March 2025, Segamat railway station has been served by KTM ETS services, with one return trip each on the Butterworth-Segamat ETS Gold route, Butterworth-JB Sentral ETS Platinum route, Padang Besar-JB Sentral ETS Gold route and Padang Besar-JB Sentral ETS Gold route, as well as four return trips on the KL Sentral-JB Sentral ETS Platinum route.

The ETS Gold routes previously terminated at Gemas station, pending the completion of the EDTP. On 15 March 2025, Segamat replaced Gemas as the new terminus of the ETS Gold routes, becoming the first station on the EDTP to be completed. This was followed by the completion of the Segamat-Kluang stretch of the EDTP with the introduction of a new ETS Platinum route between KL Sentral and Kluang. This route was subsequently extended to JB Sentral, with the completion of the remaining portion of the EDTP on 12 December 2025. On 1 January 2026, the ETS Gold route from Padang Besar was extended beyond Segamat to JB Sentral. A new ETS Platinum route between Butterworth and JB Sentral was introduced on 4 February 2026. Another new ETS Platinum route between Padang Besar and JB Sentral was introduced later on 24 February 2026.

Apart from the ETS service, station is served by KTM Intercity's Ekspres Rakyat Timuran service, which runs between JB Sentral and Tumpat once a day in each direction. Previously, the station was also served by KTM Intercity's Ekspres Selatan service running from Gemas to JB Sentral. The service was terminated on 1 January 2026, being replaced entirely by KTM ETS services.

== Station facilities ==
Constructed by YTL Corporation, the new station ranks as Johor's third-largest rail hub after JB Sentral and Kluang. It features Malaysia's first 4.5-meter-deep waterproof underground culvert system. The ground floor entrance employs split flows: left side leads to paid zones with prayer rooms and accessible toilets; right side contains ticket counters, automated machines, and commercial spaces. Elevated platforms on the first floor, accessible via elevators/escalators, utilize two side platforms with solar panel roofs. Security features include CCTV surveillance, while external facilities comprise 97 car and 49 motorcycle parking spots. Accessibility provisions include dedicated restrooms, priority parking, and tactile guidance systems. A modular prefabricated staff quarters with nine units was built west of the station to expedite construction.

== Around the station ==
- Segamat District Information Office
- Kilometre Zero (KM0) Monument of Segamat
- Segamat Roundabout
- Segamat Bus and Taxi Terminal and Bazaar
- Segamat Central Mall
