= Tanah Merah railway station =

Railway station in Malaysia

Tanah Merah

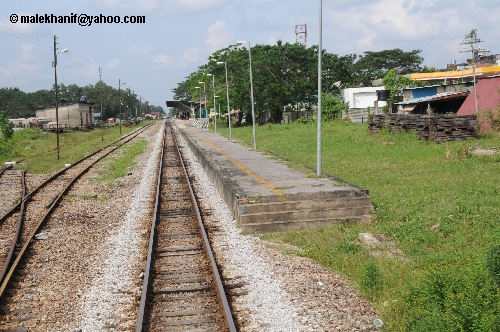
- Railway track lines and an island platform at Tanah Merah railway station

General information
- Other names: Malay: تانه ميره (Jawi); Chinese: 丹那美拉; Tamil: தானா மேரா
- Location: Tanah Merah District; Kelantan; Malaysia
- Coordinates: 5°48′23″N 102°08′48″E
- Owner: Railway Assets Corporation
- Operator: Keretapi Tanah Melayu
- Line: East Coast Line
- Platforms: 2 island platforms
- Tracks: 3

Construction
- Parking: Unknown

Services
Preceding station	Keretapi Tanah Melayu (Intercity)	Following station
Pasir Mas towards Tumpat	Ekspres Rakyat Timuran	Kuala Krai towards Johor Bahru Sentral
Bukit Panau Halt towards Tumpat	Shuttle Timur	Temangan towards Kuala Lipis
Bukit Panau Halt towards Tumpat	Shuttle Timur	Temangan towards Gua Musang
Bukit Panau Halt towards Tumpat	Shuttle Timur	Temangan towards Dabong
Location

The Tanah Merah railway station is a Malaysian railway station located in the Tanah Merah District of the state of Kelantan, Malaysia. It is on Keretapi Tanah Melayu's East Coast Line.

== Train services ==
The station is served by the following KTM Intercity services:

- Ekspres Rakyat Timuran 26/27 Tumpat–JB Sentral
- Shuttle Timur 52/53/57/58 Tumpat–Gua Musang
- Shuttle Timur 55/56 Tumpat–Dabong
- Shuttle Timur 51/60 Tumpat–Kuala Lipis

== About the Station ==
The station is often prone to floods.
