= Pasir Mas railway station =

Railway station in Malaysia

Coordinates: 6°02′34″N 102°08′33″E

Pasir Mas

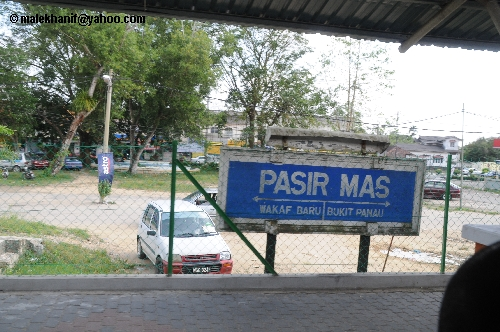
- A station signboard at Pasir Mas railway station

General information
- Other names: Malay: ڤاسير مس (Jawi); Chinese: 巴西马; Tamil: பாசிர் மாஸ்
- Location: Pasir Mas; Kelantan; Malaysia
- Owner: Railway Assets Corporation
- Operator: Keretapi Tanah Melayu
- Line: East Coast Line
- Platforms: 1 island platform
- Tracks: 3

Construction
- Structure type: At-grade
- Parking: Available, RM 2.00 per entry
- Accessible: Yes

History
- Opened: 4 May 1914
- Rebuilt: 2008

Services
Preceding station	Keretapi Tanah Melayu (Intercity)	Following station
Wakaf Bharu towards Tumpat	Ekspres Rakyat Timuran	Tanah Merah towards Johor Bahru Sentral
Bunut Susu Halt towards Tumpat	Shuttle Timur	To' Uban Halt towards Kuala Lipis
Bunut Susu Halt towards Tumpat	Shuttle Timur	Chica Tinggi Halt towards Gua Musang
Bunut Susu Halt towards Tumpat	Shuttle Timur	Chica Tinggi Halt towards Dabong
Former services
Preceding station	Keretapi Tanah Melayu	Following station
Repek towards Rantau Panjang	Rantau Panjang Line	Terminus
Location

The Pasir Mas railway station is a Malaysian railway station located at and named after the town of Pasir Mas, Kelantan. The station is on Keretapi Tanah Melayu's East Coast Line. It is the start of the disused Rantau Panjang branch line, the only branch line on the East Coast Line, which previously offered train services to Rantau Panjang, but has been discontinued since the 1970s. A new railway station, which replaced the original railway station, was completed in July 2008.

Served by KTM Intercity services, all trains running between Tumpat and JB Sentral stations call at Pasir Mas. Along this route, passenger are able to connect to the West Coast Line at Gemas for KTM ETS services to Kuala Lumpur and the northern states of Peninsular Malaysia.

This station is also mostly used as a commerce hub for the Pasir Mas area. There are restaurants nearby with benches to sit.

== Train services ==
The station is served by the following KTM Intercity services:

- Ekspres Rakyat Timuran 26/27 Tumpat–JB Sentral
- Shuttle Timur 52/53/57/58 Tumpat–Gua Musang
- Shuttle Timur 55/56 Tumpat–Dabong
- Shuttle Timur 51/60 Tumpat–Kuala Lipis
