= Kuala Krai railway station =

Railway station in Malaysia

Kuala Krai

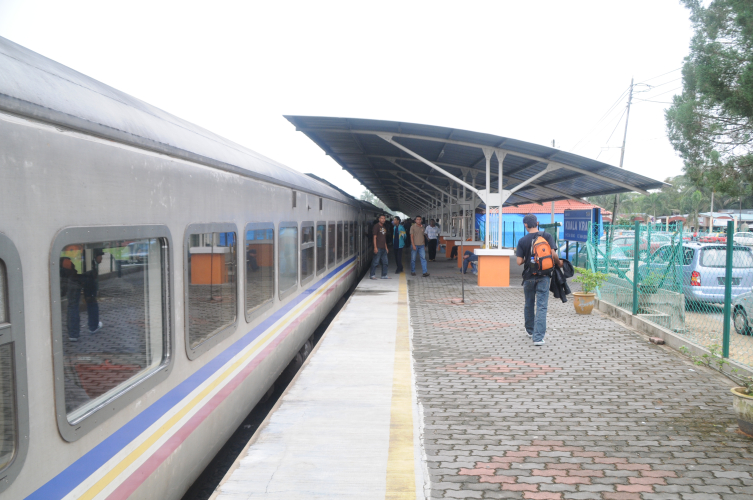

General information
- Other names: Malay: كوالا كراي (Jawi); Chinese: 瓜拉吉赖; Tamil: கோலா கிராய்
- Location: Kuala Krai; Kelantan; Malaysia
- Owner: Railway Assets Corporation
- Operator: Keretapi Tanah Melayu
- Line: East Coast Line
- Platforms: 1 side platform 1 island platform
- Tracks: 3

Construction
- Parking: Available, free.
- Accessible: Yes

Services
Preceding station	Keretapi Tanah Melayu (Intercity)	Following station
Tanah Merah towards Tumpat	Ekspres Rakyat Timuran	Dabong towards Johor Bahru Sentral
Temangan towards Tumpat	Shuttle Timur	Pahi Halt towards Kuala Lipis
Sungai Nal Halt towards Tumpat	Shuttle Timur	Pahi Halt towards Gua Musang
Sungai Nal Halt towards Tumpat	Shuttle Timur	Pahi Halt towards Dabong
Location

The Kuala Krai railway station is a Malaysian train station located at and named after the town of Kuala Krai, Kelantan. It is the biggest railway station in the state of Kelantan.

The station is on Keretapi Tanah Melayu (KTM)'s East Coast Line that runs from Tumpat and Wakaf Bharu (close to Kota Bharu) right through the interior of Peninsular Malaysia to Gemas on the west of the peninsula, where it joins the main West Coast Line linking between Woodlands Train Checkpoint and Padang Besar. The opening of the railway line made a significant difference to the remote interior of the state of Kelantan.

== Train services ==
The station is served by the following KTM Intercity services:

- Ekspres Rakyat Timuran 26/27 Tumpat–JB Sentral
- Shuttle Timur 52/53/57/58 Tumpat–Gua Musang
- Shuttle Timur 55/56 Tumpat-Dabong
- Shuttle Timur 51/60 Tumpat-Kuala Lipis

== See also ==
- Rail transport in Malaysia
