= KTM Intercity =

Malaysian intercity train services

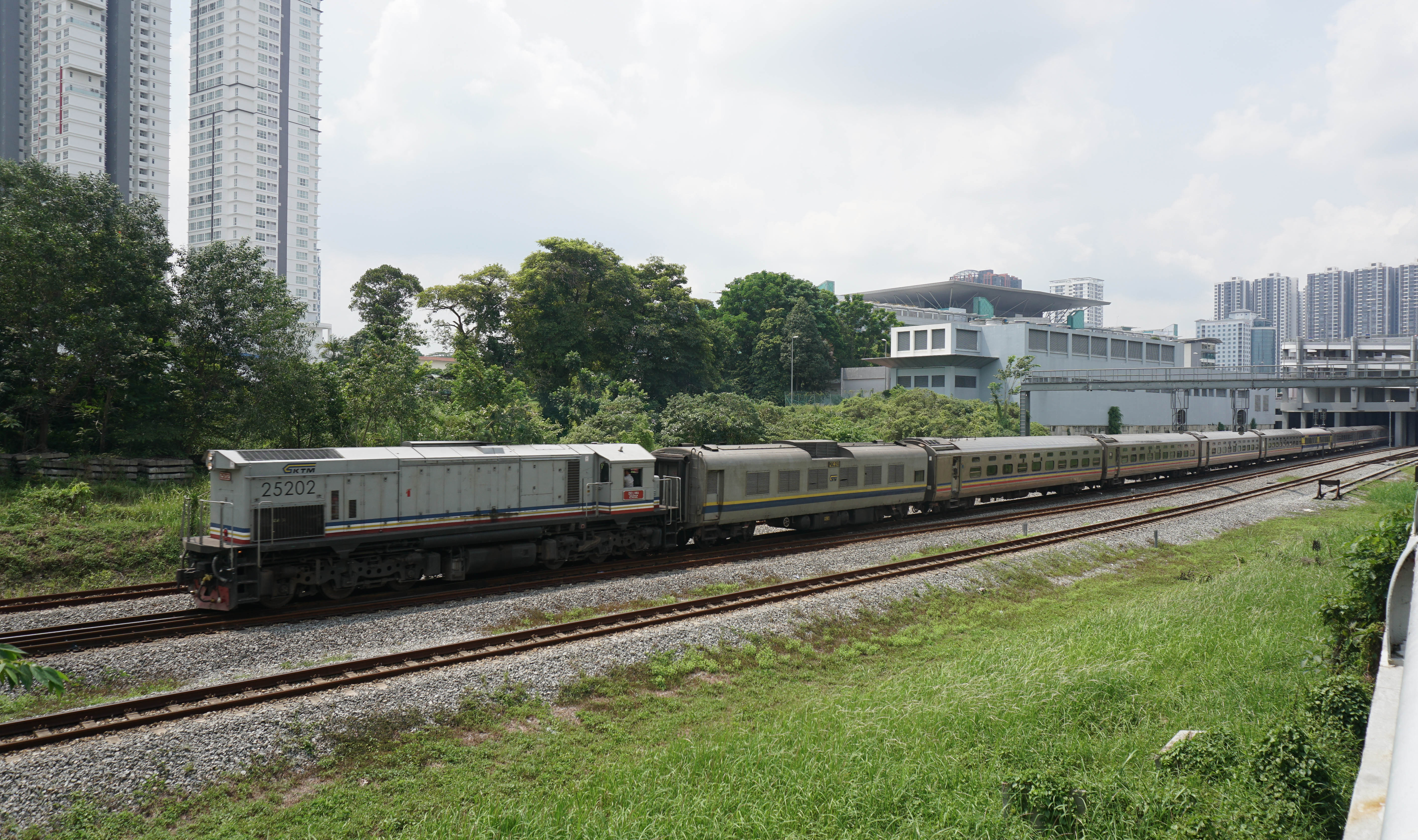
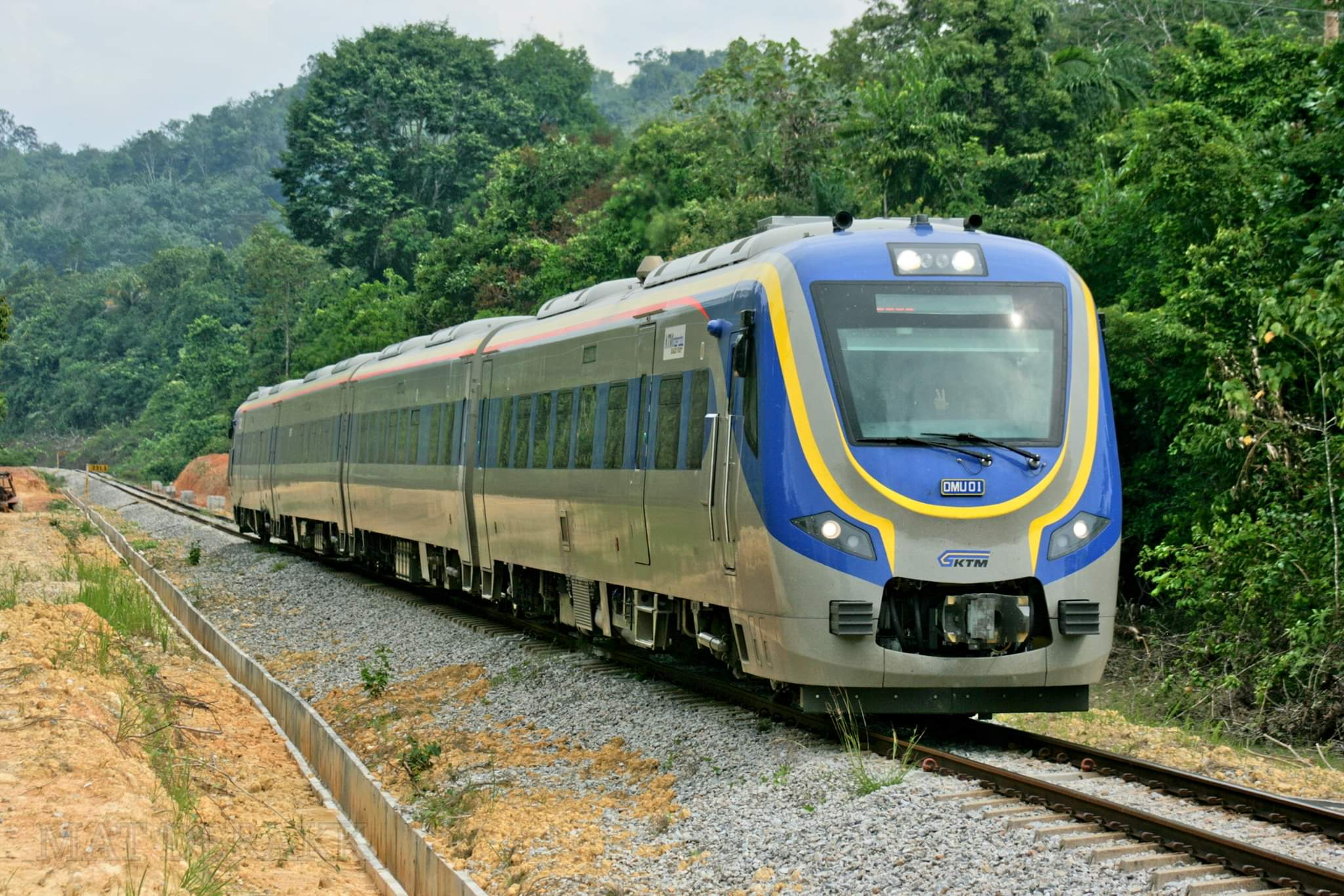
- Left: Ekspres Rakyat Timuran; Right: Shuttle Timuran

Overview
- Native name: KTM Antarabandar (Malay); KTM城际铁路(Simplified Chinese); கேடிஎம் இண்டர்சிட்டி (Tamil)
- Owner: Keretapi Tanah Melayu Berhad (KTMB)
- Area served: Peninsular Malaysia
- Transit type: Inter-city rail
- Number of lines: 2
- Line number: West Coast Line; East Coast Line
- Daily ridership: 11,747 (Q4 2026)
- Annual ridership: 4,490,815 (2025)
- Chief executive: Nurul Azha Mokmin - Head, Intercity Services
- Headquarters: 5, Jalan Sultan Hishamuddin, Tasik Perdana, 50000 Kuala Lumpur, Wilayah Persekutuan Kuala Lumpur, Malaysia
- Website: KTM Intercity

Operation
- Began operation: circa 1960s
- Operator: Keretapi Tanah Melayu (KTM)
- Rolling stock: KTM Class 23; KTM Class 24; KTM Class 25; KTM Class 26; KTM Class 29; KTM Class 61

Technical
- Track gauge: 1,000 mm (3 ft 3 3/8 in) metre gauge
- Average speed: 110 km/h (68 mph)
- Top speed: 120 km/h (75 mph)

KTM Intercity (Malay: KTM Antarabandar) are diesel-hauled intercity train services in Peninsular Malaysia, operated by Keretapi Tanah Melayu (KTM). Services primarily operate along the KTM East Coast Line between Tumpat and Gemas. Services along the KTM West Coast Line have been mostly replaced by electric-hauled KTM ETS services following electrification and double-tracking, with only two services remaining between Gemas and Woodlands Train Checkpoint in Singapore. KTM Intercity has long enjoyed moderate success, but increasingly faces competition with road and air travel, as expressways increase in number and budget airlines offer shorter travelling time. In 2006, KTM Intercity earned a profit of RM 70.94 million as group revenue, hovering around the RM 65 million mark since 2001.

== Train services ==
=== Scheduled services ===
KTM Intercity operates the following scheduled services:

Service	Terminals	Rolling stock	Coaches Available Onboard	Details
Ekspres Rakyat Timuran	Between JB Sentral and Tumpat via Gemas	Locomotive	ADNS; ASC; ABC; AFC	JB Sentral–Tumpat (1 nightly trip, both directions); Formerly known as Ekspres Senandung Timuran
Shuttle Timuran	Between Gemas and Tumpat	KTM Class 61 DMU	4 Second Class Coaches with a cafe and some toilets	Dabong–Tumpat (1 daily trip, both directions)
Shuttle Timuran	Between Gemas and Tumpat	KTM Class 61 DMU	4 Second Class Coaches with a cafe and some toilets	Gemas–Kuala Lipis (2 daily trips, both directions)
Shuttle Timuran	Between Gemas and Tumpat	KTM Class 61 DMU	4 Second Class Coaches with a cafe and some toilets	Gua Musang–Kuala Lipis (1 daily trip, both directions)
Shuttle Timuran	Between Gemas and Tumpat	KTM Class 61 DMU	4 Second Class Coaches with a cafe and some toilets	Gua Musang–Tumpat (2 daily trips, both directions)
Shuttle Timuran	Between Gemas and Tumpat	KTM Class 61 DMU	4 Second Class Coaches with a cafe and some toilets	Kuala Lipis–Tumpat (1 daily trip, both directions)

=== Seasonal services ===
KTM Intercity operates the following seasonal services:

Service	Terminals	Rolling stock	Coaches Available Onboard	Details
MySawasdee	Between KL Sentral and Hat Yai Junction	Locomotive	ADNS; ASC; ABC; AFC; AXC; Chillax	Seasonal service to/from Thailand
RTSM Excursion Train	Between KL Sentral and Butterworth	Locomotive	ASC; AFC; ABC; AXC; Chillax	
Ekspres Lambaian Aidilfitri	Between KL Sentral and Tumpat	Locomotive	ADNS; ASC; ABC; AFC; Chillax	Seasonal service during Eid al-Fitr
Ekspres Lambaian Aidiladha	Between KL Sentral and Tumpat	Locomotive	ADNS; ASC; ABC; AFC; Chillax	Seasonal service during Eid al-Adha

=== Cross-border services ===
The Shuttle Tebrau is an international cross-border train service between Johor Bahru, Malaysia, and Woodlands, Singapore. The service commenced in 2015, replacing direct KTM Intercity services between Kuala Lumpur and Singapore. The service initially operated 14 daily trips between JB Sentral and the Woodlands Train Checkpoint, comprising 7 Johor Bahru-bound services and 7 Woodlands-bound services. The service has since expanded to operate 31 daily trips, comprising 13 Johor Bahru-bound services and 18 Woodlands-bound services.

For passengers travelling from Johor Bahru to Woodlands, Malaysian immigration checks are conducted at JB Sentral before boarding. Singaporean immigration checks are conducted at Woodlands Train Checkpoint after alighting. For passengers travelling from Woodlands to Johor Bahru, both Singaporean and Malaysian immigration checks are conducted at Woodlands Train Checkpoint before boarding. No further immigration checks are conducted at Johor Bahru after alighting.

The Shuttle Tebrau service will be replaced by the Johor Bahru–Singapore Rapid Transit System (RTS) in 2027. Whilst the Malaysian government has expressed intention to maintain the service even after the RTS has commenced operation, it has yet to receive agreement from the Singaporean government as of April 2026.

=== Former services ===
KTM Intercity operated the following former services:

Service	Terminals	Hauled by	Coaches Available Onboard	Service Termination Date	Details
Ekspres Makmur	Between Gemas and Kuala Lipis	Locomotive	ASC; AEC	Unknown	Former service replaced by Shuttle Timuran
Ekspres Peninsular	Between JB Sentral and Hat Yai Junction	Locomotive	ADNS; ASC; AEC; ABC; AFC	19th May 2016	Former services replaced by KTM ETS
Ekspres Rakyat	Between JB Sentral and Butterworth	Locomotive	AFC; ASC; ABC	08th May 2016	Former services replaced by KTM ETS
Ekspres Selatan	Between JB Sentral and Gemas	Locomotive	ASC; ABC	31st December 2025	Former services replaced by KTM ETS
Senandung Malam	Between KL Sentral and Tanjong Pagar	Locomotive	ADNS; ASC; AEC; ABC; AFC; ADNFD; ADNFB	Possibly in 2014	Former services replaced by KTM ETS
Senandung Sutera	Between JB Sentral and Ipoh	Locomotive	ADNS; ASC; AEC; ABC; AFC; ADNFD; ADNFB	Around 2015 - 2016	Former services replaced by KTM ETS
Sinaran Selatan	Between KL Sentral and Woodlands Train Checkpoint	Locomotive	ASC; AFC	Possibly around 2015	Former services replaced by KTM ETS
Senandung Wau	Between KL Sentral and Tumpat	Locomotive	ADNS; ASC; AEC; ABC; ADNFB	Early 2015 (Due to the massive flood that destroyed the KTM East Coast railway line)	Former service replaced by KTM ETS between KL Sentral and Gemas; Continued between Gemas to Tumpat by Ekspres Rakyat Timuran
Senandung Langkawi	Between KL Sentral and Hat Yai Junction	Locomotive	ADNS; ASC; AEC; ABC; ADNFB	Around 2015 and replaced by Ekspres Peninsular	Extended towards JB Sentral and renamed with Ekspres Peninsular; Former services replaced by KTM ETS; Now replaced with MySawasdee service

== Travel classes ==
KTM Intercity offers the following travel classes:

- Air-conditioned First Class (AFC) - First-class seats (2+1 configuration). AFC seats are available on Ekspres Rakyat Timuran services and seasonal services. AFC seats offer more legroom and recline compared to ASC seats.
- Air-conditioned Second Class (ASC) - Second-class seats (2+2 configuration). ASC seats are available on all KTM Intercity services. ASC seats on Shuttle Timuran services do not recline.
- Air-conditioned Day-Night Sleeper (ADNS) - Sleeper berths (20 upper berths and 20 lower berths per carriage). ADNS berths are available on Ekspres Rakyat Timuran services and seasonal services. ADNS berths can be converted to seats for daytime use.
- Air-conditioned Economy Class (AEC) - Second-class seats (2+2 configuration). 74 seats were available onboard. Those with minimal budget will be taking this coach to travel anywhere. Previously available on almost every KTM Intercity service, but now withdrawn from service (as of 2026).
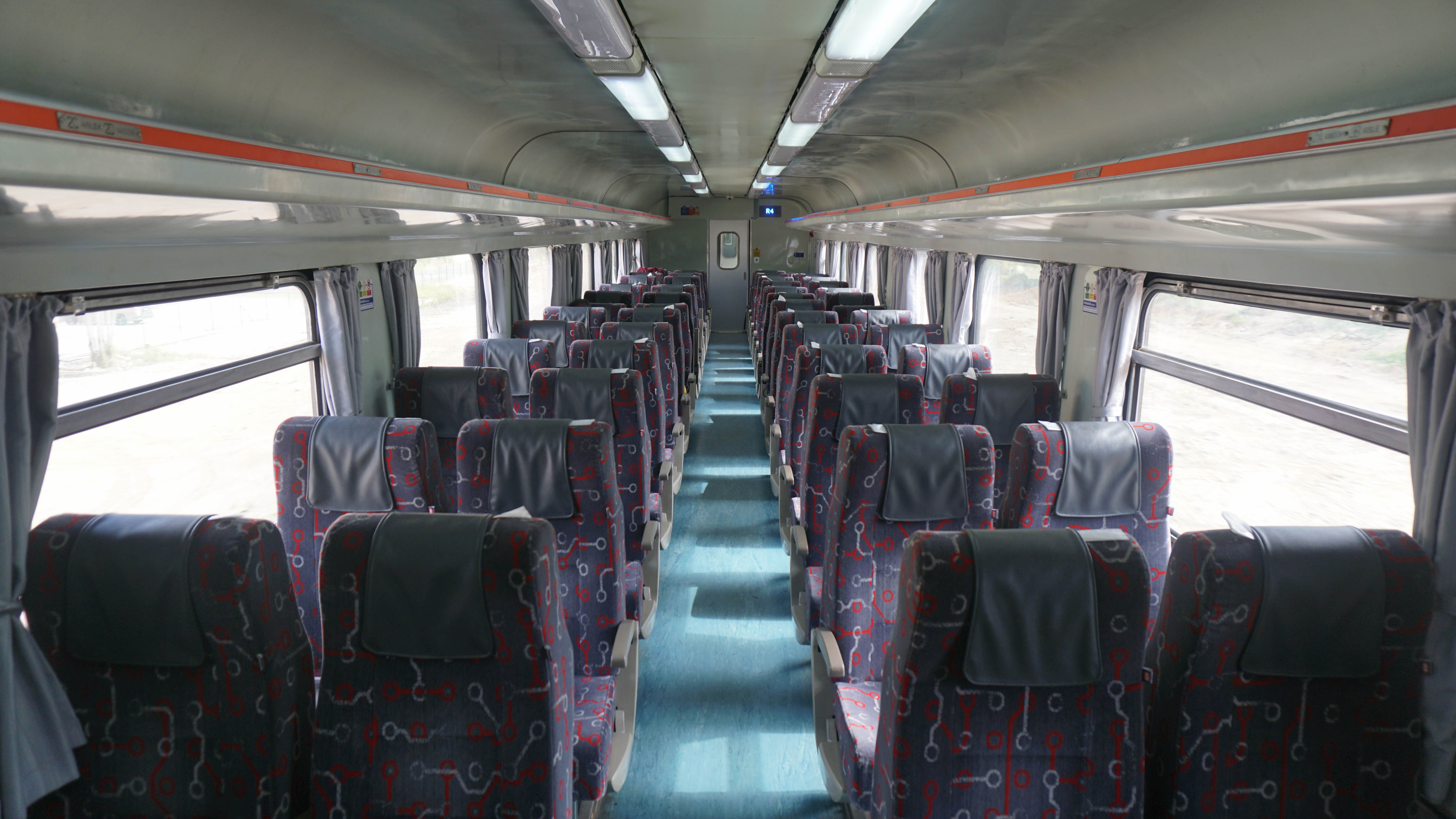
ASC: Air-conditioned Second Class

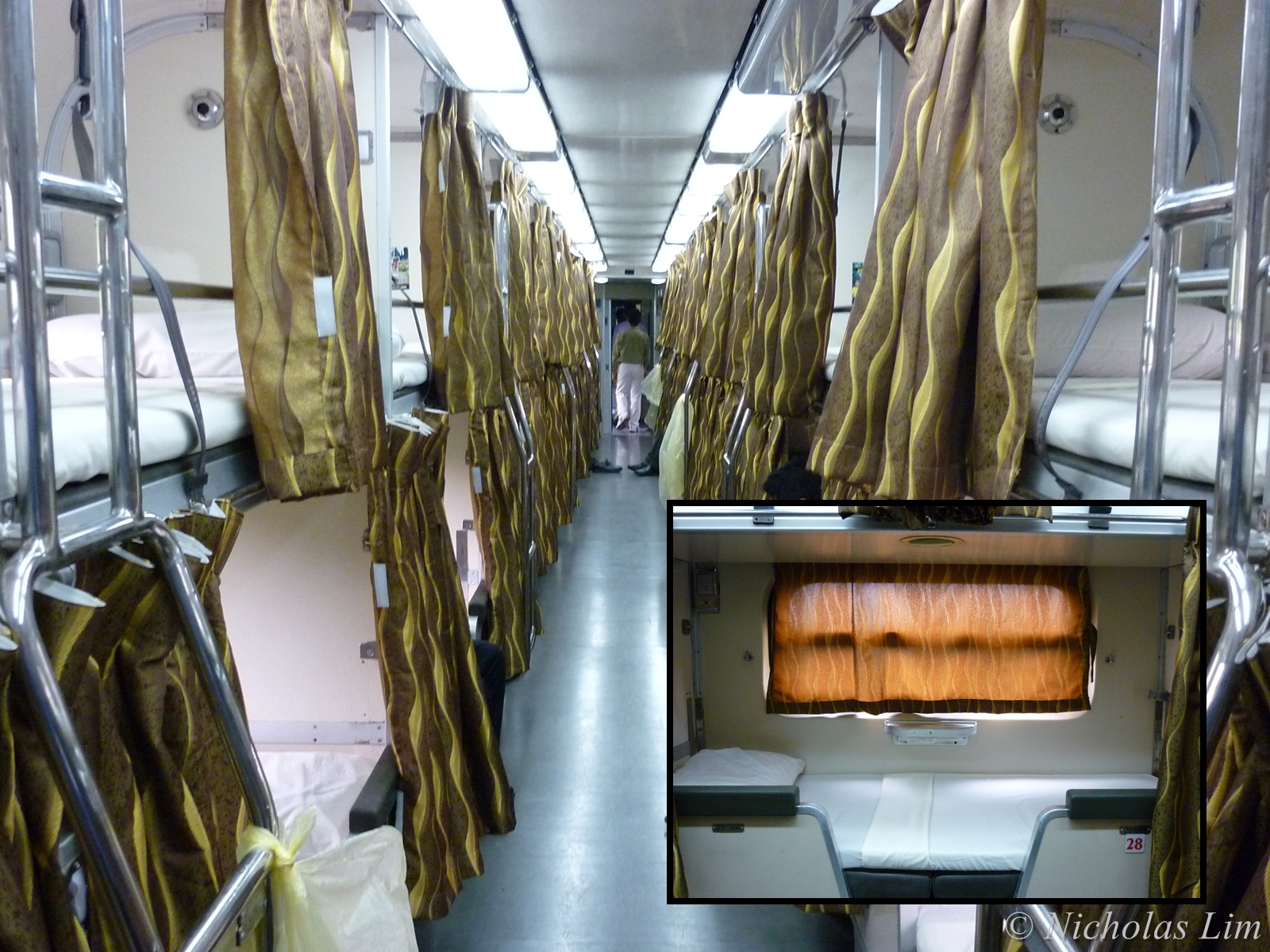
ADNS: Air-conditioned Day-Night Sleeper

== List of stations ==
KTM Intercity serves the following list of stations:

- Stations in bold indicate major stops.
- Green ticks indicate two-way stops.
- Red ticks indicate one-way stops.

**Name**	**ERT**	**T-KL**	**T-GM**	**T-D**	**GM-KL**	**KL-G**	**JB-W**
**Tumpat**	check	check	check	check			
Kampung Kok Pasir halt			check	check			
**Wakaf Bharu**	check	check	check	check			
Bunut Susu halt	check	check	check				
**Pasir Mas**	check	check	check	check			
Chica Tinggi halt			check	check			
To' Uban halt		check	check	check			
Sungai Keladi halt			check	check			
Bukit Panau halt		check	check	check			
**Tanah Merah**	check	check	check	check			
Temangan		check	check	check			
Sungai Nal halt			check	check			
**Kuala Krai**	check	check	check	check			
Pahi halt		check	check	check			
Manek Urai		check	check	check			
Kampung Baru Sungai Mengkuang halt		check	check	check			
Ulu Temiang halt		check	check	check			
Kampung Baru Bukit Abu halt		check	check	check			
Bukit Abu		check	check	check			
Kuala Gris halt		check	check	check			
**Dabong**	check	check	check	check			
Kemubu		check	check				
Sri Jaya halt		check	check				
Sri Mahligai halt		check	check				
Sri Bintang halt		check	check				
Sungai Tasin halt		check	check				
Jerek Baru halt		check	check				
Bertam halt		check	check				
Bertam Baru		check	check				
Limau Kasturi		check	check				
Sungai Sirian halt		check	check				
Kampung Sungai Sirian halt		check	check				
Pan Malayan halt		check	check				
**Gua Musang**	check	check	check		check		
Lapan Tupai halt		check					
Mentara Baru halt		check			check		
**Merapoh**	check	check			check		
Telok Gunong halt		check			check		
Sungai Temau		check			check		
Chegar Perah		check			check		
Aur Gading halt		check			check		
Kampung Berkam halt		check			check		
Bukit Betong halt		check			check		
Padang Tengku		check			check		
**Kuala Lipis**	check	check			check	check	
Kerambit	check					check	
Mela halt						check	
**Jerantut**	check					check	
Jenderak halt						check	
Kuala Krau	check					check	
**Mentakab**	check					check	
Mengkarak						check	
**Triang**	check					check	
**Kemayan**	check					check	
**Bahau**	check					check	
**Gemas**	check					check	
**Segamat**	check						
**Kluang**	check						
**Kulai**	check						
**Kempas Baru**	check						
**JB Sentral**	check						check
**Woodlands**							check

== Ridership ==
KTM Intercity Ridership
Year	Quarter	Ridership	Annual Ridership	Note
2026	Q4		3,152,522	
2026	Q3	1,080,845	3,152,522	As of September 2026
2026	Q2	1,063,904	3,152,522	
2026	Q1	1,007,773	3,152,522	
2025	Q4	1,165,572	4,490,815	
2025	Q3	1,156,454	4,490,815	
2025	Q2	1,107,803	4,490,815	
2025	Q1	1,060,986	4,490,815	
2024	Q4	1,129,843	4,613,213	
2024	Q3	1,170,058	4,613,213	
2024	Q2	1,161,501	4,613,213	
2024	Q1	1,151,811	4,613,213	
2023	Q4	1,258,638	4,700,857	
2023	Q3	1,203,706	4,700,857	
2023	Q2	1,140,909	4,700,857	
2023	Q1	1,097,604	4,700,857	
2022			2,677,511	
2021			304,320	
2020			1,041,040	
2019			3,746,367	
2018			3,527,137	
2017			3,092,299	

== See also ==
- Rail transport in Malaysia
- Trans-Asian Railway
