= KTM East Coast railway line =

Railway line in Malaysia

KTM East Coast Line
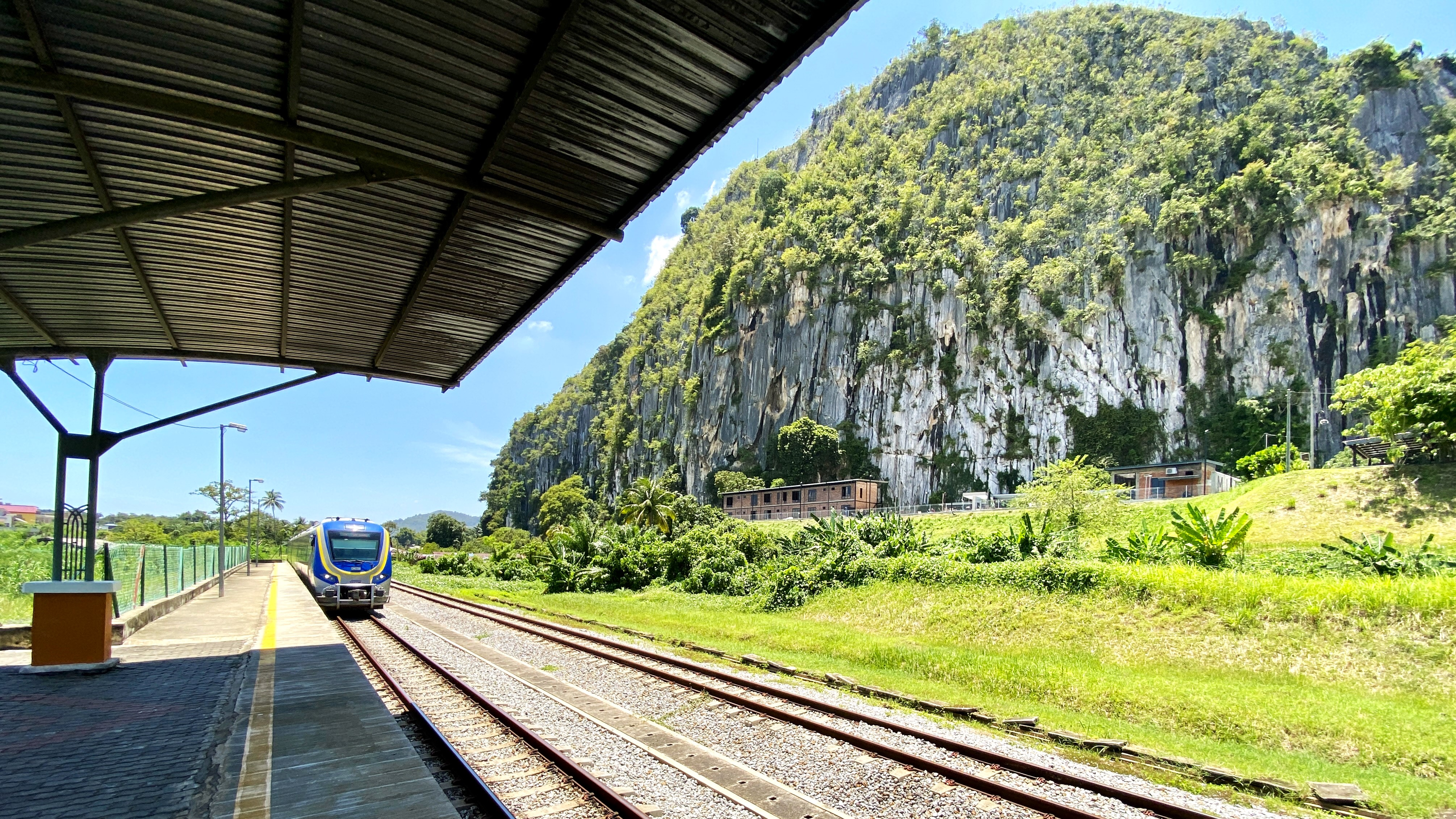
- KTM East Coast Line at Gua Musang

Overview
- Other name: Jungle Railway
- Native name: Landasan Keretapi KTM Pantai Timur (Malay); மலாயா கிழக்கு கடற்கரை தொடருந்த வழித்தடம் (Tamil); 东海岸铁路线 (Simplified Chinese); 東海岸鐵路線 (Traditional Chinese)
- Owner: Keretapi Tanah Melayu
- Locale: Peninsular Malaysia
- Termini: Tumpat; Gemas
- Continues as: West Coast Line
- Stations: 67

Service
- Type: Inter-city rail; Freight rail
- Services: KTM Intercity; KTM Kargo
- Operator: Keretapi Tanah Melayu
- Depots: Tumpat; Kuala Krai; Gua Musang; Kuala Lipis

History
- Opened: 4 April 1910; 116 years ago
- Completed: 5 September 1931; 95 years ago

Technical
- Number of tracks: 1
- Character: Scenic route
- Track gauge: 1,000 mm (3 ft 3 3/8 in) metre gauge

The KTM East Coast railway line is a single-track metre gauge railway line in Malaysia that runs between Gemas in Negeri Sembilan and Tumpat in Kelantan. Gemas is the rail junction between the West Coast Line and East Coast Line. Like the West Coast Line, it is called the East Coast railway line because it serves two of Peninsular Malaysia's East Coast states, namely Pahang and Kelantan. However, it does not actually run along the coast at all and only meets the South China Sea when it terminates at Tumpat. It runs through the interior of Peninsular Malaysia, often through deep jungle, thus earning the nickname Jungle Railway. Terengganu is the only state in Peninsular Malaysia not served by the KTM railway network.

The East Coast Rail Link (ECRL) is planned to have an interchange with the East Coast Line at Mentakab and expand the railway network to the cities located in the East Coast, such as Kuantan and Kuala Terengganu.

== History ==
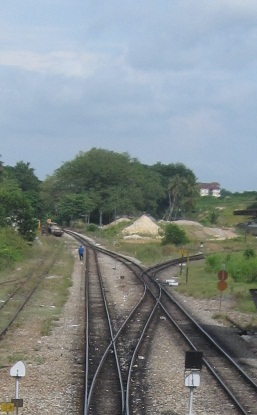
The junction between the KTM West Coast Line (left) and East Coast Line (right) north of Gemas. Most of the stretch of the West Coast Line has been double tracked and electrified to make way for the KTM ETS service, a new higher-speed intercity service introduced by Keretapi Tanah Melayu in 2010.

The East Coast Line was briefly disrupted due to floods which struck the east coast states on 22 December 2014, causing extensive damage to the track infrastructure, signage equipment as well as track maintenance machinery which were submerged underwater. In August 2020, then Malaysian Transport Minister Wee Ka Siong said the government had allocated RM874.7m to upgrade track infrastructure and trains at the east coast sector and projected that the railway would resume services by 2021.

On 12 April 2021, KTMB launched its KTM Class 61 Diesel Multiple Unit (DMU) trains for the East Coast Line route between Kelantan and Pahang. Wee Ka Siong said the DMU trains were being introduced specifically to replace KTM's conventional diesel trains for KTM Intercity's Shuttle Timuran service between Tumpat and Kuala Lipis. He claimed the new DMU will reduce travel time as the average speed of the train is about 100kph, compared to the conventional trains that run between 50kph and 60kph. The DMU trains, covering 216km from Tumpat and Gua Musang and 94km from Gua Musang to Kuala Lipis, would be fully operational in stages. The Tumpat-Gua Musang-Kuala Lipis route represents the first phase of the upgrading process. The second phase will cover routes to Gemas, while the third phase will cover the Gua Musang–Mentakab stretch along the Pahang route.

=== Timeline ===
- 4 April 1910: Bahau – Gemas
- 1 October 1910: Triang – Bahau
- 1 August 1911: Mentakab – Triang
- 1 March 1912: Kuala Krau – Mentakab
- 16 November 1912: Kuala Teh (closed) – Kuala Krau
- 15 May 1913: Tembing (closed) – Kuala Teh (closed)
- 4 May 1914: Tumpat – Pasir Mas – Tanah Merah
- 15 October 1917: Kuala Lipis – Tembing (closed)
- 1 September 1920: Pasir Mas – Rantau Panjang
- 16 March 1921: Padang Tengku – Kuala Lipis
- 15 November 1923: Chegar Perah – Padang Tengku
- 21 July 1924: Tanah Merah – Kuala Krai
- 17 October 1927: Kuala Krai – Manek Urai
- 5 December 1927: Merapoh – Chegar Perah
- 14 July 1930: Manek Urai – Kuala Gris and Gua Musang – Merapoh
- 5 September 1931: Kuala Gris – Gua Musang

== Services ==
The East Coast railway line is served by the following:

- KTM Intercity
  - Ekspres Rakyat Timuran between Tumpat and JB Sentral via Gemas.
    - The route between Gemas and JB Sentral is part of the West Coast Line while the route between Gemas and Tumpat is on the East Coast Line)
  - Shuttle Timur (stops at all stations and halts)
    - Between Tumpat and Dabong
    - Between Tumpat and Gua Musang
    - Between Tumpat and Kuala Lipis
    - Between Gua Musang and Kuala Lipis
    - Between Kuala Lipis and Gemas
- KTM ETS at Gemas (train services to Padang Besar, Butterworth, KL Sentral, Segamat and JB Sentral on the West Coast Line)

== Line network ==
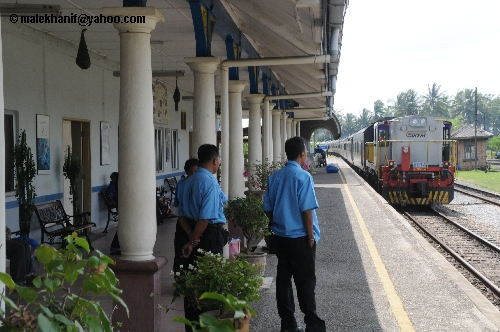
Tumpat station, the northern terminus of the East Coast line

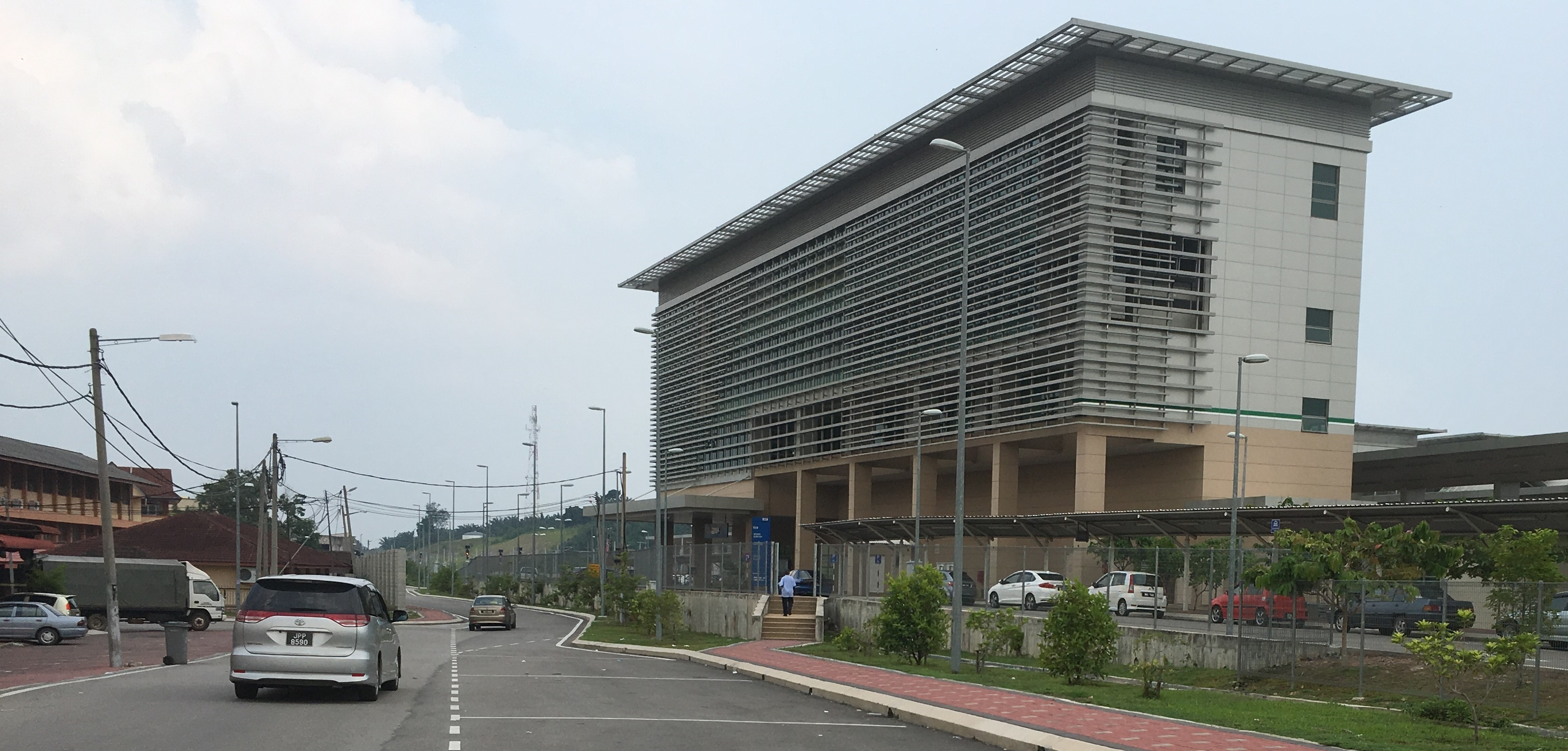
Gemas station, the southern terminus of the East Coast line

=== Main line ===
| Station names | Cities, Towns, Landmarks Served | Territory | Cumulative distance (km) | Comments |
|---|---|---|---|---|
| Tumpat | Tumpat | Kelantan | 0.0 | |
| Kampung Berangan | | Kelantan | | Not in service |
| Kampung Kok Pasir | | Kelantan | | Halt |
| Palekbang | | Kelantan | | Halt, Not in service |
| Wakaf Bharu | Kota Bharu | Kelantan | 14.0 | The nearest railway station to Kelantan state capital, Kota Bharu |
| Bunut Susu | | Kelantan | 18.1 | Halt |
| Kampung Machang | | Kelantan | | Halt, Not in use |
| Pasir Mas | Pasir Mas | Kelantan | 24.8 | Interchange to Rantau Panjang Branch Line |
| Chica Tinggi | | Kelantan | 30.1 | Halt |
| To' Uban | | Kelantan | 33.4 | Halt |
| Sungai Keladi | | Kelantan | 39.0 | Halt |
| Bukit Panau | | Kelantan | 42.0 | Halt |
| Tanah Merah | Tanah Merah | Kelantan | 51.5 | |
| Sungai Kusial | | Kelantan | | Not in service |
| Kampung Paloh Rawa | | Kelantan | | Halt, Not in service |
| Temangan | Guillemard Bridge | Kelantan | 64.4 | |
| Tanjung Bidal | | Kelantan | | Halt, Not in service |
| Kampung Bidal | | Kelantan | | Halt, Not in service |
| Sungai Nal | | Kelantan | 77.6 | Halt |
| Kuala Krai | Kuala Krai | Kelantan | | 84.9 |
| Pahi | | Kelantan | 92.7 | Halt |
| Manek Urai | | Kelantan | 101.5 | |
| Sungai Mengkuang | | Kelantan | | Halt, Not in use |
| Kampung Baru Sungai Mengkuang | | Kelantan | | Halt |
| Ulu Temiang | | Kelantan | 116.1 | Halt |
| Kampung Baru Bukit Abu | | Kelantan | | Halt |
| Bukit Abu | | Kelantan | 127.9 | |
| Kuala Gris | | Kelantan | 131.3 | Halt |
| Dabong | Dabong | Kelantan | 139.4 | |
| Kemubu | | Kelantan | 148.2 | |
| Sri Jaya | | Kelantan | 153.4 | Halt |
| Sri Mahligai | | Kelantan | 155.7 | Halt |
| Sri Bintang | | Kelantan | 157.6 | Halt |
| Sungai Tasin | | Kelantan | 159.5 | Halt |
| Jerek Baru | | Kelantan | 163.6 | Halt |
| Bertam | | Kelantan | | Halt |
| Bertam Baru | | Kelantan | 170.4 | |
| Limau Kasturi | | Kelantan | 178.9 | |
| Sungai Sirian | | Kelantan | | Halt |
| Kampung Sungai Sirian | | Kelantan | 186.6 | Halt |
| Sungai Koyan | | Kelantan | | Halt, Not in service |
| Pan Malayan | | Kelantan | 194.7 | Halt |
| Chegar Bongor | | Kelantan | | Not in service |
| Sungai Kemudu | | Kelantan | | Not in service |
| Kuala Neroh | | Kelantan | | Not in service |
| Gua Musang | Gua Musang | Kelantan | 206.1 | |
| Chin Teck | | Kelantan | | Not in service |
| Lapan Tupai | | Kelantan | | Halt |
| Mentara | | Kelantan | | Halt, Not in service |
| Mentara Baru | | Kelantan | 226.4 | Halt |
| Merapoh | | Pahang | 230.8 | |
| Merapoh Baharu | | Pahang | | Not in service |
| Telok Gunong | | Pahang | 236.2 | Halt |
| Kubang Rasa | | Pahang | | Halt, Not in service |
| Sungai Yu | | Pahang | | Not in service |
| Sungai Temau | | Pahang | 255.7 | |
| Chegar Perah | | Pahang | 264.1 | |
| Paya Keladi | | Pahang | | Not in service |
| Aur Gading | | Pahang | 271.5 | Halt |
| Dura | | Pahang | | Halt, Not in service |
| Kampung Berkam | | Pahang | 278.8 | Halt |
| Bukit Betong | Bukit Betong | Pahang | 284.9 | Halt |
| Kampung Berhala | | Pahang | | Halt, Not in service |
| Telang | Telang | Pahang | | Halt, Not in service |
| Padang Tengku | | Pahang | 291.2 | |
| Kuala Ketir | | Pahang | | Halt, Not in service |
| Kuala Lipis | Kuala Lipis | Pahang | 299.9 | |
| Kuala Lanar | | Pahang | | Not in service |
| Tanjung Sekawin | | Pahang | | Halt, Not in service |
| Sibar | | Pahang | | Halt, Not in service |
| Batu Sembilan | | Pahang | | Halt, Not in service |
| Kuala Lentang | | Pahang | | Not in service |
| Kerambit | | Pahang | 323.1 | |
| Sungai Lik | | Pahang | | Halt, Not in service |
| Limau Purut | | Pahang | | Not in service |
| Mela | | Pahang | 333.9 | Halt |
| Kampung Sepial | | Pahang | | Not in service |
| Tembeling | | Pahang | | Not in service |
| Padang Piol | | Pahang | | Not in service |
| Paya Teh | | Pahang | | Not in service |
| Teh | | Pahang | | Halt, Not in service |
| Jerantut | Jerantut; Temerloh | Pahang | 353.3 | |
| Jeransong | | Pahang | | Not in service |
| Jendarak | 362.0 | Pahang | | Halt |
| Mai | | Pahang | | Halt, Not in service |
| Kuala Krau | | Pahang | 379.1 | |
| Sungai Dalam | | Pahang | | Not in service |
| Tekal | | Pahang | | Halt, Not in service |
| Kerdau | | Pahang | | Halt |
| Mentakab | Mentakab | Pahang | 405.5 | |
| Sungai Belengu | | Pahang | | Not in service |
| Mengkarak | | Pahang | 427.8 | |
| Mentri | | Pahang | | Not in service |
| Triang | Teriang | Pahang | 437.8 | |
| Mengkuang | | Pahang | | Halt, Not in service |
| Kemayan | | Pahang | 444.9 | |
| Ayer Hitam | | Negeri Sembilan | | Not in service |
| Bahau | Bahau | Negeri Sembilan | 490.8 | |
| Rompin | | Negeri Sembilan | | Not in service |
| Londah | | Negeri Sembilan | | Not in service |
| Gemas | Gemas | Negeri Sembilan | 527.7 | Interchange with West Coast Line |
(Continue to West Coast Line)

=== Rantau Panjang branch line ===
| Station names | Cities, Towns, Landmarks Served | Territory | Cumulative distance (km) | Comments |
|---|---|---|---|---|
Rantau Panjang Junction between Pasir Mas and Tanah Merah stations (Continue to main East Coast Line)
| Pasir Mas | Pasir Mas | Kelantan | | |
| Repek | | Kelantan | | Not in service |
| Lubok Batil | | Kelantan | | Not in service |
| Gual Periok | | Kelantan | | Not in service |
| Gual Sitok | | Kelantan | | Not in service |
| Rantau Panjang | Rantau Panjang | Kelantan | | Not in service |
(Continue to SRT Southern Line in Thailand)
