= Dabong railway station =

Railway station in Dabong, Malaysia

Coordinates: 5°22′37.6″N 102°00′35.8″E

Dabong

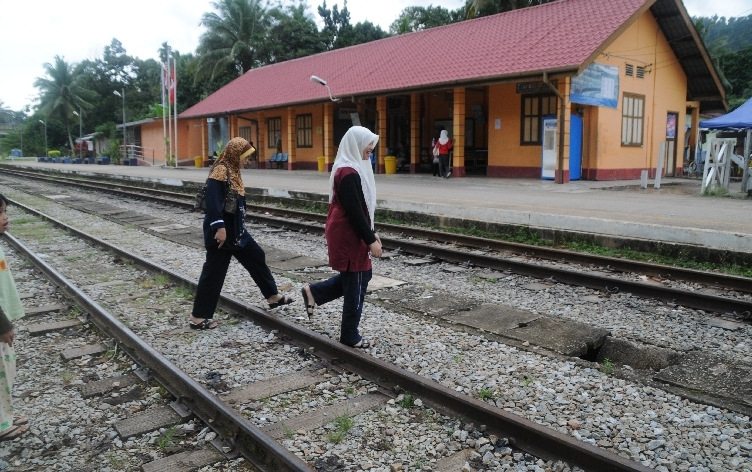
- Two women crossing the railway tracks near Dabong railway station.

General information
- Other names: Malay: دابوڠ (Jawi); Chinese: 达蓬; Tamil: தாபோங்
- Location: Dabong, Kuala Krai District; Kelantan; Malaysia
- Owner: Railway Assets Corporation
- Operator: Keretapi Tanah Melayu
- Line: East Coast Line
- Platforms: 1 side platform 1 island platform
- Tracks: 3

Construction
- Structure type: At-grade
- Parking: Available, free
- Accessible: Yes

Services
Preceding station	Keretapi Tanah Melayu (Intercity)	Following station
Kuala Krai towards Tumpat	Ekspres Rakyat Timuran	Gua Musang towards Johor Bahru Sentral
Kuala Gris Halt towards Tumpat	Shuttle Timur	Kemubu towards Kuala Lipis
Kuala Gris Halt towards Tumpat	Shuttle Timur	Kemubu towards Gua Musang
Kuala Gris Halt towards Tumpat	Shuttle Timur	Terminus
Location

The Dabong railway station is a Malaysian railway station located at and named after the town of Dabong in the Kuala Krai District of the state of Kelantan. It is operated by Keretapi Tanah Melayu (KTM) and is part of the East Coast Line, commonly referred to as the “Jungle Railway” due to its route through the thick rain forest of Peninsular Malaysia. It is the terminus for KTM Intercity Shuttle Timur services that runs between Tumpat and Dabong.

== Train services ==
The station is served by the following KTM Intercity services:

- Ekspres Rakyat Timuran 26/27 Tumpat–JB Sentral
- Shuttle Timur 52/53/57/58 Tumpat–Gua Musang
- Shuttle Timur 55/56 Tumpat–Dabong
- Shuttle Timur 51/60 Tumpat–Kuala Lipis

== History and Events ==
In January 2022, a KTM train failed to stop at the station, affecting over 100 students from SMK Dabong who missed school due to the incident. The event highlighted the importance of Dabong station as a local transit hub for rural education and mobility.

== Tourist Access ==
Dabong station is a key access point for travelers heading to Gunung Stong State Park, which features attractions such as the Jelawang Waterfall and limestone caves. Tourists often use the Jungle Railway route as a scenic way to reach the interior eco-destinations of Kelantan.
