= Keretapi Tanah Melayu =

Malaysian rail operator

Keretapi Tanah Melayu Berhad كريتاڤي تانه ملايو برحد

Overview
- Headquarters: Kuala Lumpur
- Reporting mark: KTMB
- Locale: Peninsular Malaysia and Singapore
- Dates of operation: 1885–present

Technical
- Track gauge: 1,000 mm (3 ft 3 3/8 in) metre gauge
- Electrification: 25 kV 50 Hz AC overhead catenary
- Length: 3,264 km (2,028 mi)

Keretapi Tanah Melayu Berhad
- Type: Government-owned companies through Minister of Finance (Incorporated)
- Founded: 1992
- Headquarters: Jalan Sultan Hishamuddin, 50621 Kuala Lumpur, Malaysia
- Key people: Musa Sheikh Fadzir, Chairman; Mohd Rani Hisham Samsudin, Chief Executive Officer
- Services: KTM ETS; KTM Intercity; KTM Komuter; KTM Kargo; DMU (Diesel Multiple Unit)
- Net income: ▲ -RM6.455 million (2022); -RM92.305 million (2021)
- Total assets: ▲RM545,204,000 (2022); RM487,827,000 (2021)
- Website: www.ktmb.com.my

Keretapi Tanah Melayu Berhad (KTMB) (lit. 'Malayan Railway Limited'; Jawi: كريتاڤي تانه ملايو برحد) or colloquially referred to simply as KTM, is the main railway operator in Peninsular Malaysia. The railway system dates back to the British colonial era, when it was first built to transport tin. Previously known as the Federated Malay States Railways (FMSR), the Malayan Railway Administration (MRA), and the Malayan Railway, KTM acquired its current name in 1962. The organization was corporatized in 1992, but remains wholly owned by the Malaysian government.

== History ==
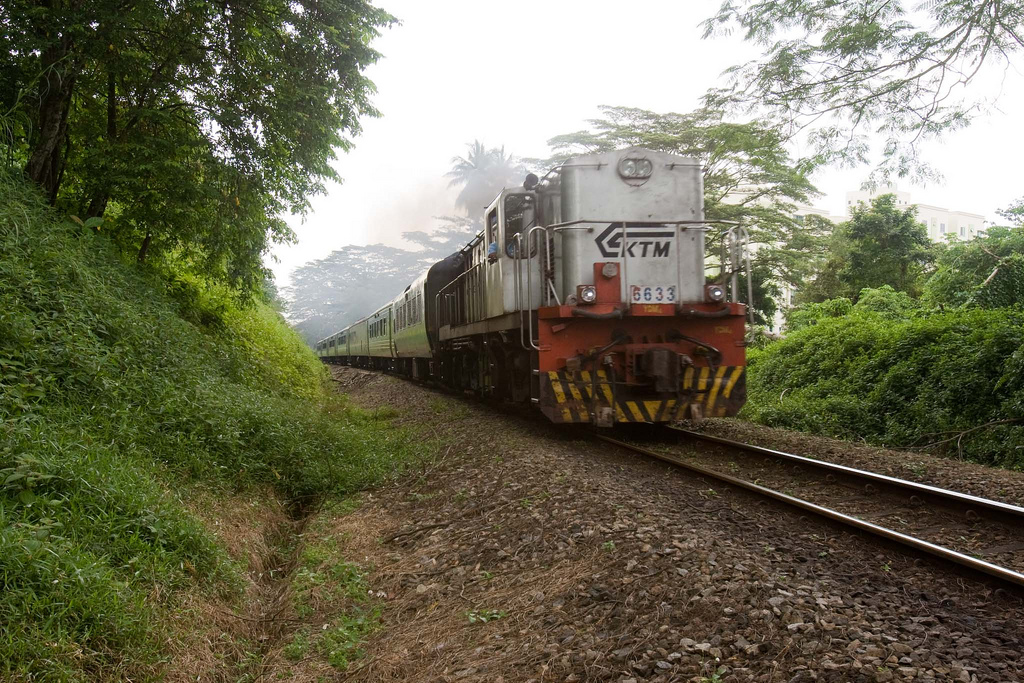
A KTM Intercity train in Singapore (2010)

In 1948, the FMSR was renamed the Malayan Railway. The railways had been devastated by the Japanese invasion of Malaya, and efforts were taken to rebuild the two main lines, but many branch lines were abandoned in the process.

The MR began to modernize the equipment with the ordering of diesel locomotives and railcars to replace steam-hauled services, and the first diesel locomotive entered service in 1957. The railcars entered service in 1960, initially on short-haul services. Rapid services were introduced later, cutting travel times from Singapore to Kuala Lumpur down to six hours, which was competitive at the time. MR and later KTM continued ordering more diesel locomotives through the decades, rendering the old steam locomotives redundant. The last steam locomotive was withdrawn from service in 1974.

Malayan Railways also operated an air service from 1954 to 1958, known as Federation Air Service. The service was transferred to Malayan Airways in March 1958.

The 1970s saw the closure of many branch lines, such as the Batu Arang branch in 1971 and the historic Taiping to Port Weld branch in 1972. The Port Dickson branch was converted to freight-only operation in 1972, although seasonal passenger service did continue for a short while. However, construction did continue for a new line to the Subang Airport used to transport fuel, which opened in 1980.

Railbuses were introduced in the 1980s for short-haul commuter services. They were deployed in the Klang Valley, on Kuala Lumpur to Ipoh, Ipoh to Butterworth, Gemas to Mentakab and Kulai to Singapore services. On certain routes such as Kulai to Singapore, the railbuses were faster than conventional trains, and in this instance saved travel time of 15 minutes. They lasted until the introduction of KTM Komuter in 1995, which took over commuter services in the Klang Valley except for Kulai to Singapore, where a planned Johor Bahru to Singapore route utilizing electric multiple units (overhead rail variant) was abandoned after Singapore moved their border controls on the railway to Woodlands Train Checkpoint in 1998.

KTM was corporatized in 1992, with all assets now under the ownership and management of the Railway Assets Corporation (RAC). The company runs as a private enterprise although owned and subsidized by the Malaysian government. There were attempts by private companies to take over the operations since then, but such proposals were rejected by the Malaysian government.

The 1990s saw the start of another modernization program. Proposals were made to electrify and double-track the West Coast Line, which started with the Klang Valley area. Electric trains made their debut on 3 August 1995 with KTM Komuter, with services from Port Klang to Sentul and Rawang to Seremban. Under this program, existing stations were renovated or rebuilt, and new stations were built.

The program was faced with delays throughout the 2000s, with the government postponing many electrification projects. However, from 2007 onwards there was a renewed effort to electrify the rest of the West Coast Line. The completion of such electrification projects from Padang Besar to JB Sentral to date has allowed the commencement of electrified intercity services in the form of KTM ETS. As the projects were completed in stages, the KTM Komuter and KTM ETS services were expanded over the years to take advantage of the upgraded lines. The East Coast Line, which had not seen upgrades for many years, saw upgrades in the form of rehabilitated track, new Diesel multiple units (DMUs). and many refurbished and rebuilt stations.

== Railway network ==
The 1000mm gauge network consists of two main lines and several branch lines.

=== West Coast Line ===
The West Coast Line runs from the Malaysia-Thailand Border, where it connects with the State Railway of Thailand, to Woodlands Train Checkpoint in Singapore, serving the West Coast states of Peninsular Malaysia. The line runs through most of the major stations in Peninsular Malaysia, such as JB Sentral, Gemas, KL Sentral, Ipoh, Butterworth and Padang Besar railway station.

==== Branch lines ====
There are several branch lines running from the West Coast Line. Some are mixed traffic, catering to passenger and freight traffic while others only cater to freight trains.

- Kuala Lumpur - Port Klang (Mixed Traffic), with further branches:
  - Subang Jaya - Terminal SkyPark (Passenger - Not In Service)
  - Port Klang - Pulau Indah (Freight)
- Putra - Batu Caves (Mixed Traffic)
- Butterworth - Bukit Mertajam (Mixed Traffic), with a further branch:
  - Butterworth - North Butterworth Container Terminal (Freight)
- Kempas Baru - Tanjung Pelepas (Freight)
- Kempas Baru - Pasir Gudang (Mixed Traffic)

=== East Coast Line ===
The East Coast Line branches off from the West Coast Line at Gemas, running to Tumpat in Kelantan, serving two of Peninsular Malaysia's East Coast states, namely Pahang and Kelantan. Despite its name, it only meets the coast when it reaches Tumpat railway station. It runs through the interior, often through deep jungle, thus earning the nickname Jungle Railway.

==== Branch line ====
There is only one branch line on the East Coast Line, between Pasir Mas and Rantau Panjang in Kelantan which was completed in 1921. However, since 1978, this branch line has not been in use.

== Infrastructure ==
The total network spans 1,789 km (1,112 mi). The total length of the network was 3,264 km (2,028 mi), however due to the closure and/or abandonment of several sections, the network is now shorter.

The West Coast Line is double tracked and electrified between Padang Besar and JB Sentral, along with all branch lines used for passenger service along this stretch. As part of the upgrades, all level crossings have been removed and modern signaling installed.

The stations along this line are a combination of heritage stations from the colonial era, such as Ipoh and Kuala Lumpur stations, and modern stations that were built when the line was double-tracked, such as Taiping, Butterworth, and Arau stations.

The East Coast Line is single tracked and not electrified. Having not seen many upgrades over the years, the line is considerably less modern than the upgraded sections of the West Coast Line. Level crossings are still prevalent, and the traditional token signaling system is still used. The stations along this line are older and smaller. Although the line will remain single-tracked, worn track has been replaced, and many stations also being upgraded.

Most of the lines use concrete sleepers, which replaced wooden sleepers from 1982 for the Kerdau-Jerantut and Sungai Yu-Tumpat lines and became more widespread after upgrading works in recent years.

The network now exclusively use concrete sleepers.

== Rolling stock ==
List of Shunters
Class	Image	Manufacturer	Year built	Built	Numbers	Type	Status
15		(United Kingdom) English Electric Co. Ltd.	1948-1949	20	15101-15120	Diesel-Electric	Decommissioned. As of 1 October 2026, 1 unit, No. 15101 is preserved at KTMB Sungai Petani Station.
16		(United Kingdom) North British Locomotive Company	1955	6	16101-16106	Diesel-Hydraulic	Decommissioned
17		(Japan) Kisha Seizo	1964	15	17101-17105	Diesel-Hydraulic	Decommissioned
18		(Netherlands) Brush HMA	1979	10	18101-18110	Diesel-Electric	Decommissioned. As of October 2026: No. 18109 is preserved at Johor Bahru Old Railway Station @ Museum and 1 unit preserved at Batu Gajah Depot.
19		(Japan) Hitachi	1983	10	19101-19110	Diesel-Electric	In Service. As of October 2026: 4 units active, 6 units inactive.

List of Mainline Diesels
Class	Image	Manufacturer	Year built	Built	Numbers	Type	Status
20		(United Kingdom) English Electric Co. Ltd. Associated Vulcan Foundry Locomotive Works	1957	26	20101-20126	Diesel-Electric	Decommissioned. As of 1 October 2026, No. 20125 preserved at Sultan Alam Shah Museum, Shah Alam and one of the cabs of No. 20116 is on display in front of Victoria Station Restaurant in Jalan Ampang.
21		(Japan) Kisha Seizo	1965 1968	25	21101-21115 21201–21210	Diesel-Hydraulic	Decommissioned. As of 1 October 2026: 1 unit, No. 21111 "Sungai Lukut" is preserved at People's Museum, Malacca.
22		(United Kingdom) English Electric Associated Electrical Industries Metro-Cammell	1971	40	22101-22140	Diesel-Electric	Decommissioned. As of 1 October 2026: 5 units preserved: National Museum (No. 22121 "Anak Bukit", re-numbered to 22102 "Seri Menanti"), First Galleria Taiping (No. 22125 Telok Chempedak), Old Gemas Railway Station (No. 22131 "Limau Kasturi"), Johor Bahru Old Railway Station @ Museum (No. 22134 "Durian Tunggal), Pekan Cafe Belibis (Sultan Abu Bakar Museum), Pekan, Pahang, Malaysia (No. 22135 "Geliga") Preserved KTM 22 Class Locomotive and AEC Coaches at Pekan Kafe Belibis (Sultan Abu Bakar Museum) • RailTravel Station, 3 transferred for use by civil engineering contractors (especially by EMRAIL).
23		Hitachi Ltd. Japan	1983	15	23101-23115	Diesel-Electric	In Service. As of 1 October 2026: 4 unit active, 11 units decommissioned with 1 unit preserved at Istana Sultan Johor
24		Toshiba Corporation Japan, associated Kawasaki Heavy Industries, Ltd. Japan.	1987	26	24101-24126	Diesel-Electric	In Service. As of 1 October 2026: 8 units active, 18 units decommissioned with 1 unit preserved at Mess Sri Kota, Bukit Tunku KL.
25		(Canada) Electro-Motive Diesel	1990 2002	17	25101-25112 25201–25205	Diesel-Electric	In Service. As of 1 October 2026: all 16 units active, with 25106 "Pulau Ketam" is still being stored at Batu Gajah Railway Depot.
26		(Germany) - (United States) Adtranz	2003	20	26101-26120	Diesel-Electric	In Service. As of 1 October 2026: all 20 units active.
29		(China) Dalian Locomotive & Rolling Stock	2005	20	29101-29120	Diesel-Electric	In Service. As of 1 October 2026: all 20 units active.
YDM4		(United States) American Locomotive Company	1996	39		Diesel-Electric	All exported to India, where then more units was exported to various countries.

List of Electric Locomotives
Class	Image	Manufacturer	Year built	Built	Numbers	Type	Status
EL		(China) CRRC	2015	2	EL001-002	Electric	Decommissioned, returned to China

List of Diesel Multiple Units
Class	Image	Manufacturer	Year built	Type	Status
27		(Australia) Commonwealth Engineering	1960	Diesel-Electric Railcar	Decommissioned As of 1 October 2026, all units decommissioned
28		(Japan) Hitachi	1966	Diesel-Electric Railcar	Decommissioned As of 1 October 2026, all units decommissioned
Railbus		(Hungarian People's Republic) Ganz Mavag	1988	Diesel Railbus	Decommissioned As of 1 October 2026, all units decommissioned
61		(China) CRRC Zhuzhou Locomotive	2019	Diesel-Electric Multiple Unit	In service. As of 1 October 2026, all 13 units in service.

List of KTM Komuter Electric Multiple Units
Class	Image	Manufacturer	Year built	Built	Numbers	Status
81		(Austria) Jenbacher	1994	18	EMU 01-EMU 18	In service. As of 1 October 2026, 4 refurbished and in service, EMU 01 scrapped, others abandoned at depots and scrapped.
82		(South Africa) Union Carriage & Wagon	1996	22	EMU 41-EMU 62	All decommissioned. As of 1 October 2026, all units has been scrapped.
83		(South Korea) Hyundai Rotem	1996	22	EMU 19-EMU 40	In Service. As of 1 October 2026, 15 units active, 7 decommissioned.
84		(China) CRRC Zhuzhou Locomotive	2027	12	EMU 63-EMU 74	EMU 63 arrived in Malaysia on August 14th for fault-free run testing, while the rest will be assembled locally at the CRRC Rolling Stock Center, Batu Gajah.
92		(China) CRRC Zhuzhou Locomotive	2012	38	SCS 01-SCS 38	In Service. As of 1 October 2026, 33 in service, 4 unknown, and 1 caught fire and was decommissioned.

List of KTM ETS Electric Multiple Units
Class	Image	Manufacturer	Year built	Built	Numbers	Status
91		(South Korea) Hyundai Rotem (Japan) Mitsubishi Electric	2009	5	ETS 01-ETS 05	In service As of 1 October 2026, all 5 units in service.
93		(China) CRRC Zhuzhou Locomotive	2015 2019	19	ETS 201- ETS 210 (Class 93/1) ETS 211 - ETS 219 (Class 93/2)	In service As of 1 October 2026, all 20 units in service
94		(China) CRRC Zhuzhou Locomotive	2025	10	ETS 301- ETS 310	In service. As of 1 October 2026, all 10 units in service.

== Depots ==
=== Northern Depot ===
- Padang Besar Depot
- Bukit Tengah Depot
- Batu Gajah Depot:
  - ETS Depot
  - Central Workshop

=== Central Depot ===
- KL Sentral Depot
- Port Klang Depot
- Sentul Depot

=== Southern Depot ===
- SCS Seremban Depot
- Gemas Depot
- Kempas Baru Depot

=== East Coast Depot ===
- Tumpat Depot
- Kuala Lipis Depot

== Services ==
As a national railway company, KTM is involved in the business of providing rail-based transportation. This can be divided into four major services:

=== KTM Intercity ===
KTM Intercity (Malay: KTM Antarabandar) is the brand name for long-haul passenger trains that connect cities and major towns served by the KTM rail network.

The service is provided using conventional locomotive-hauled coaches and newer diesel multiple units (DMUs). Services span the length of East Coast Line, and a small portion of the West Coast Line network. Current daily services include:
Locomotive-hauled coaches:

- Ekspres Rakyat Timuran from JB Sentral in Johor, to Tumpat in Kelantan with 1 return trip daily,
- Shuttle Tebrau from JB Sentral in Johor to the Woodlands Train Checkpoint in Singapore, with 18 Singapore-bound trains and 13 Johor-bound trains.

DMUs:

- Shuttle Timuran from Gemas to Tumpat in Kelantan with:
1. Gemas - Kuala Lipis (2 return trips daily)
2. Kuala Lipis - Tumpat (1 return trip daily)
3. Kuala Lipis - Gua Musang (1 return trip daily)
4. Gua Musang - Tumpat (2 return trips daily)
5. Dabong - Tumpat (1 return trip daily)

It is possible for customers to rent specialized coaches for event management, conferences and even weddings.

KTM Intercity has also been involved in various types of collaborations, joint-promotions, and cross-promotions with all state-level tourism bodies, travel agencies and travel-related industry players in developing rail packages for group travellers.

=== KTM ETS ===
The KTM ETS, an abbreviation for Electric Train Service, is a higher-speed rail intercity train service that uses electric multiple unit (EMU) trainsets on the same meter-gauge like the rest of the railway. The service originally started 2010 and has currently expanded, with the last extension opened on 12 December 2025. The trains travel up to 140 km/h (87 mph) on electrified lines, although they are designed to be capable of up to 160 km/h (99 mph).

It currently operates on the main West Coast Line from JB Sentral, Johor to Padang Besar, Perlis as well as the branch line to Butterworth, Penang. The train service was recently extended down south towards JB Sentral, providing connections onward to Singapore via the KTM Intercity's Shuttle Tebrau service and the RTS Link in the future.

These services have reduced travel time as compared to the previous intercity services which ran on diesel, with a considerably lower top speed at around 80 km/h (50 mph), and have brought a revival to intercity rail travel, which was previously beaten out by faster road and air options. Ridership for intercity rail service has more than doubled in the past decade to over 8.75 million in 2024.

=== KTM Komuter ===
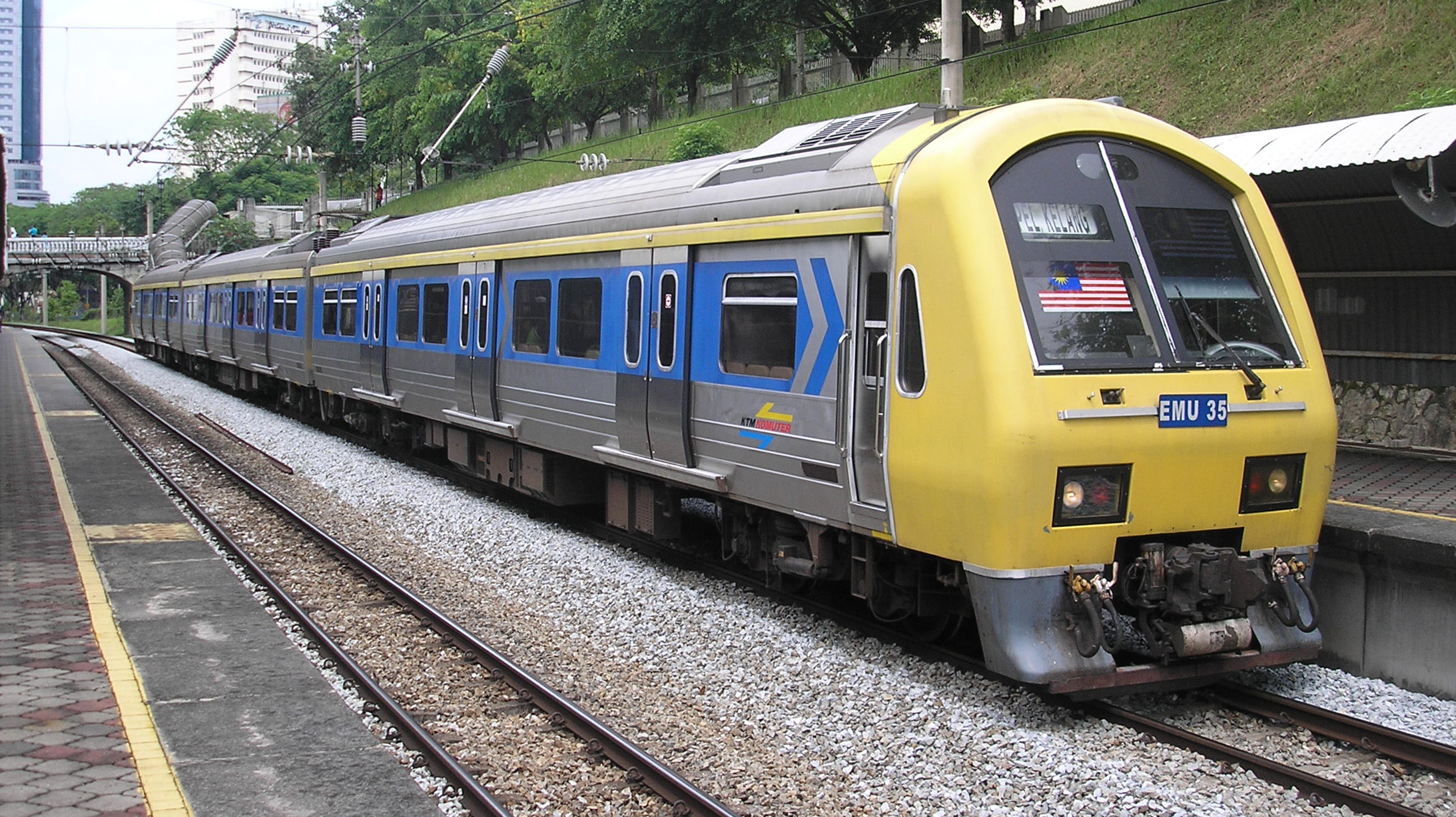
A KTM Komuter Class 83 at Bank Negara station.

KTM Komuter is a commuter rail service serving the Klang Valley, the Greater Penang Conurbation in the north and the Johor Bahru Conurbation in the south.

The central sector in the Klang Valley consists of the Batu Caves–Pulau Sebang Line Tanjung Malim–Port Klang Line and KL Sentral–Terminal Skypark Line. The KL Sentral-Terminal SkyPark Line is an airport train service linking KL Sentral to the Sultan Abdul Aziz Shah Airport in Subang, Selangor. However, the service was suspended from 15th February 2023 onwards due to low ridership. The entire Central Sector fleet presently consists of the KTM Class 83 (three-car) and KTM Class 92 (six-car) trainsets.

The KTM Komuter Northern Sector consists of two routes, namely the Butterworth-Ipoh Line and Padang Besar-Butterworth Line. It mostly utilized by KTM Class 92 (six-car) and KTM Class 83 (three-car) trainsets.

The KTM Komuter Southern Sector (officially known as the Shuttle Selatan) is the latest Komuter service in the country with two routes, the Paloh-JB Sentral Line and the Kempas Baru-Pasir Gudang Line. As of 1 October 2026, the sets that were used on these lines were:

- Kempas Baru - Pasir Gudang Line: Some of KTM Intercity's ASC (Air-Conditioned Second Class Coach) coaches hauled by diesel locomotives.
- JB Sentral - Paloh Line Line: KTM Class 81 EMU 09 & KTM Class 83 EMU 25 (Hybrid Service)

=== KTM Kargo ===
KTM Kargo provides cargo conveyance services, with a network that spans almost the whole of the KTMB rail network. It is accessible from seaports and Inland Container Terminal (ICT) as well as industrial centres.

Cargo services are a major contributor to KTM's overall revenue.

Currently, there are 45 cargo train services daily with 23 routes daily, of which about 70% are concentrated in the Northern sector. KTMB runs 37 freight train services daily of which about 80% are concentrated in the Northern sector.

The services include

- Bukit Ketri - Kuang (Cement) (Operated by CIMA)
- Padang Rengas - Batu Caves (Cement) (Operated by YTL Cement)
- Padang Rengas - Gelang Patah (Cement)
- Kanthan - Padang Jawa (Cement)
- Tasek - Gelang Patah (Cement)
- Prai - Padang Besar (South Thai Cargo)
- Pelabuhan Klang - Prai (Landfeeder)
- Pelabuhan Klang - Padang Besar (Landfeeder)
- Pelabuhan Klang - Ipoh (Landfeeder)
- Pelabuhan Klang - Pasir Gudang (Landfeeder)
- North Port - West Port (Inter Terminal Transfer)
- West Port - North Port (Inter Terminal Transfer)
- PTP - Pasir Gudang (Inter Terminal Transfer)
- Prai - Thungsong (Landbridge)
- Prai - Surathani (Landbridge)
- Prai - Padang Besa (Thai) - (Landbridge)
- Pelabuhan Klang - Hatyai (Landbridge)
- Sungai Way - Bangkok (Landbridge)
- Prai - Sungai Buloh (Sugar)
- Gurun - Butterworth (Urea) (Operated by PETRONAS)

Main commodities carried by rail comprise the following:

1. Maritime containers
2. Landbridge cargos
3. Cement
4. Sugar
5. Gypsum
6. Chemicals

Generally, cargo is moved either in open or covered wagons. As of 2025, covered wagons have been replaced with containers to allow for flexibility i.e. goods can be dismounted from the train and delivered directly to customers' premises.

== Non-rail subsidiaries ==
KTM operates several non-rail subsidiaries. Though considered as non-core businesses, KTMB has benefited from these two operations, which are:

- Multimodal Freight (MMF)

Multimodal Freight Sdn. Bhd., incorporated in 1988, was licensed as a government approved Container Haulier in 1991, and went on to obtain the Government approved Multimodal Transport Operator (MTO) status in 1999. The company operates a fleet of 225 Prime Movers and 1,300 trailers of both 20-foot and 40-foot configurations. The fleet is deployed at all major seaports and the inland ports of Ipoh and Nilai.

- KTM Distribution (KTMD)

Its core business was in the provision of express parcel distribution services to the commercial, industrial and administrative sectors and operated within Malaysia and Singapore. Parcel distribution previously carried out via parcel train cars attached to intercity services where items like parcel and motorbikes could be carried, but this practice has since moved to trucks after rail modernization and the closure of Tanjong Pagar Railway station in Singapore. Previously, KTMD was also licensed by the Malaysian Communications & Multimedia Commission as a courier service provider, which enabled it to carry letters and documents up to 2 kg (4.4 lb). On 1 November 2022, KTM Distribution announced it would be ending its service after 38 years of operations.

== Modernization ==
Since the corporatization of KTMB, a program of modernization has been underway. In 1989, it embarked on the double-tracking and electrification of the trunk line between Rawang and Seremban, the branch lines between Batu Junction and Sentul and between Kuala Lumpur and Port Klang, allowing KTM Komuter services to start running in 1995. Successive double tracking projects have allowed for expansion of electrification to intercity services in the form of the KTM ETS. The entire portion of the West Coast Line that is used for passenger service (except for the JB Sentral-Woodlands portion), has been fully electrified as of 12 December 2025.

=== Completed projects ===
- Rehabilitation of 327 km (203 mi) long meter-gauge tracks from Paloh to Singapore and from Slim River to the main Seremban line in Malaysia (1988–1994) (US$70 million)
- Electrification and double tracking of the Rawang-Seremban route (1990–1994) (US$62 million)
- Electrification and double tracking of the Kuala Lumpur-Port Klang railway route, including spur lines to Subang Jaya and Sentul (1991–1994) (US$66 million)
- Construction of railway bridges, road over bridges and underpasses along the Rawang-Kajang route (1991–1994) (US$6 million)
- Construction of railway bridges, road over bridges and underpasses along the Kajang-Seremban route (1991–1994) (US$16 million)
- Widening of railway tunnels near Seremban (1994–1995) (US$4 million)
- Construction of railway culverts and box pushing along the Nilai-Seremban route (1994–1995) (US$4 million)
- Track linking Port Klang to Pulau Indah (1997–1999) (US$4 million)
- Construction of the Port of Tanjung Pelepas, a rail link in Johor (1999–2002) (US$121 million)
- Track works at Kuala Lumpur Sentral station (1999–2001) (RM14.3 million)
- Electrification and double tracking of the Rawang-Ipoh route (2000–2008) (RM2.57 billion)
- Electrification and double tracking of the Sentul-Batu Caves route (2006–2010) (RM515 million)
- Electrification and double tracking of the Seremban-Gemas route (2008–2013) (RM3.45 billion)
- Electrification and double tracking of the Ipoh-Padang Besar route (2008–2014) (RM12.5 billion)
- Construction of the Subang Jaya-Terminal SkyPark route (2013–2018) (RM521 million)
- A new integrated station named Penang Sentral built which integrates ETS, KTM Komuter, LRT, bus and ferry services in one building at Butterworth.
- Electrification and double tracking of Gemas-Johor Bahru route (2018–2025)
- Rehabilitation of tracks in the Klang Valley (KVDT), Phase 1 (2016–2025)
- Rehabilitation of tracks Gemas-Mentakab (Package A) (2016 - 2027)
- Rehabilitation of tracks Jerantut-Gua Musang (Package B) (2016 - 2027)
- Rehabilitation of tracks Gua Musang-Tumpat (Package C) (2016 -2027)

=== Current projects ===
- Rehabilitation of tracks in the Klang Valley (KVDT), Phase 2 (2023 - 2027)
- Komuter service from Kempas Baru to Port Tanjung Pelepas. Proposed 13 stations along the route linking Iskandar Puteri to Johor Bahru and Pasir Gudang.

=== Proposed projects ===
- Outer Ring Railway Service to connect all suburbs in the Klang Valley without going through the city center. Superseded by MRT Circle Line.
- Construction of the Subang Jaya-Sungai Buloh Link which will act as a freight bypass to allow freight trains to avoid having to enter the Kuala Lumpur Komuter network. Works are divided into two phases; Phase 1 is from Subang Jaya to Terminal SkyPark; Phase 2 is from Terminal SkyPark to Sungai Buloh. Phase 1, currently known as the KL Sentral–Terminal Skypark Line, was completed in 2018 but operations have been suspended since 15th February 2023.
- Extension of the ETS service to Hat Yai, Thailand.
- Rehabilitation of railway track between Rantau Panjang and Pasir Mas.

== Board of directors ==
- Chairman: YBhg. Datuk Musa Hj Sheikh Fadzir
- Chief Executive Officer (CEO): YBrs. Encik Mohd Rani Hisham Samsudin
- Non-Independent, Non-Executive Director: YBrs. Encik Iszad Jeffri Ismail
- Independent Non-Executive Director: YBrs. Encik Md Silmi Abd Rahman, YBhg.Datuk Seri Yew Teong Look
- Heads of Strategic Business Units;
  - KTM Intercity: Puan Nurul Azha Mokmin
  - KTM Komuter: Pn Suhaila Saad
  - KTM Kargo: Encik Hezri Ariffin

== Previous and current logos ==
Greater emblem of Malayan Railways, 1948–1984

Lesser emblem, 1962–1984

Malayan Railway livery in the 1960s

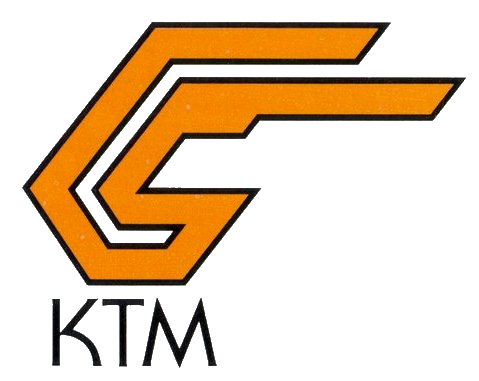
KTM 1984–1991, designer Mr. Anuar bin Dan

KTM 1991–present

== See also ==
- Rail transport in Malaysia
- Prasarana Malaysia
- MRT Corp
- Sabah State Railway
- Transport in Malaysia
