= Gua Musang railway station =

Malaysian train station

Coordinates: 4°52′44.9″N 101°58′00.3″E

Gua Musang

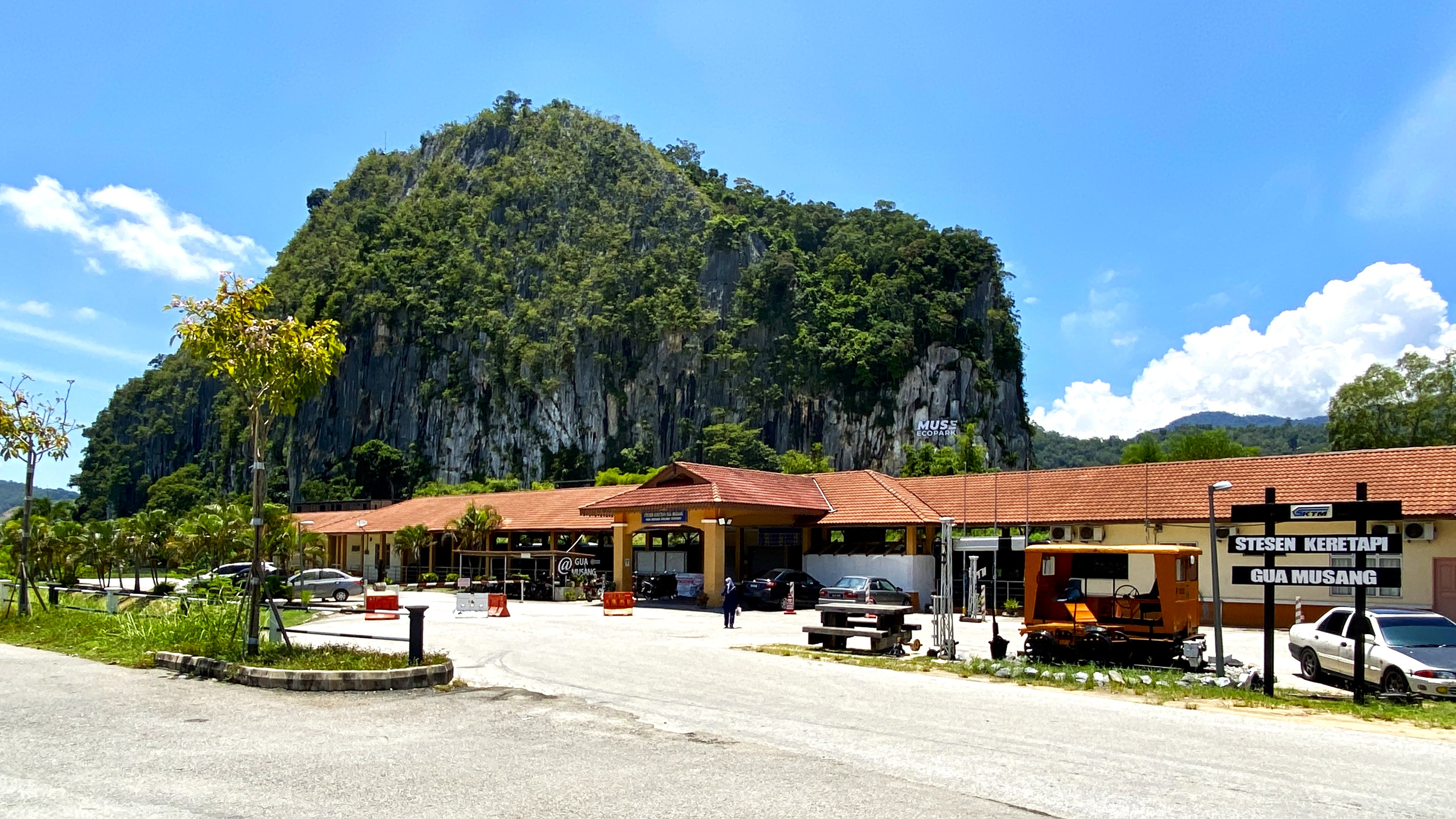
- Gua Musang Railway Station

General information
- Other names: Malay: ݢوا موسڠ (Jawi); Chinese: 话望生; Tamil: குவா மூசாங்
- Location: Gua Musang; Kelantan; Malaysia
- Owner: Railway Assets Corporation
- Operator: Keretapi Tanah Melayu
- Line: East Coast Line
- Platforms: 1 side platform
- Tracks: 2

Construction
- Parking: Available, free.
- Accessible: Yes

Services
Preceding station	Keretapi Tanah Melayu (Intercity)	Following station
Dabong towards Tumpat	Ekspres Rakyat Timuran	Merapoh towards Johor Bahru Sentral
Pan Malayan Halt towards Tumpat	Shuttle Timur	Lapan Tupai Halt towards Kuala Lipis
Pan Malayan Halt towards Tumpat	Shuttle Timur	Terminus
Terminus	Shuttle Timur	Mentara Baru Halt towards Kuala Lipis
Location

The Gua Musang railway station is a Malaysian train station stationed at and named after the town of Gua Musang in the Gua Musang District of the state of Kelantan. The old station located at the end of the main street in the old town was closed. The current, new station is about 1 km south of the old station.

== Train services ==
The station is served by the following KTM Intercity services:

- Ekspres Rakyat Timuran 26/27 Tumpat–JB Sentral
- Shuttle Timur 52/53/57/58 Tumpat–Gua Musang
- Shuttle Timur 51/60 Tumpat–Kuala Lipis
- Shuttle Timur 50/59 Gua Musang–Kuala Lipis
