= Tumpat railway station =

Railway station in Tumpat, Malaysia

Coordinates: 6°11′56″N 102°10′03″E

Tumpat

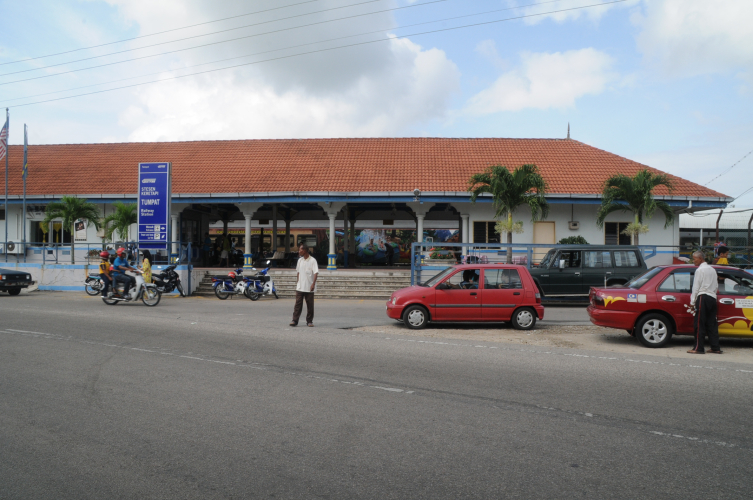

General information
- Other names: Malay: تومڤت (Jawi); Chinese: 道北; Tamil: தும்பாட்
- Location: Tumpat, Tumpat District; Kelantan; Malaysia
- Owner: Railway Assets Corporation
- Operator: Keretapi Tanah Melayu
- Line: East Coast Line
- Platforms: 1 side platform 1 island platform
- Tracks: 3

Construction
- Structure type: Concrete building
- Parking: Available, free.

History
- Opened: 4 May 1914
- Rebuilt: 2018

Services
Preceding station	Keretapi Tanah Melayu (Intercity)	Following station
Terminus	Ekspres Rakyat Timuran	Wakaf Bharu towards Johor Bahru Sentral
Terminus	Shuttle Timur	Wakaf Bharu towards Kuala Lipis
Terminus	Shuttle Timur	Kampung Kok Pasir Halt towards Gua Musang
Terminus	Shuttle Timur	Kampung Kok Pasir Halt towards Dabong
Location
- Location within Malaysia

The Tumpat railway station is a Malaysian railway station located at and named after the town of Tumpat in the Tumpat District of the state Kelantan. It is also the northern terminus of Keretapi Tanah Melayu's East Coast Line.

In 2018, station upgrading works as well as a project to build a depot began. The station was upgraded to accommodate an estimated passenger capacity of 1,500 people per day. The upgrade works of the station involved the construction of a new station building, upgrading the existing platform level, and construction of a full roof and a footbridge. The depot will be built with an area of 4.7 hectares to accommodate 13 units of the new KTM Class 61 diesel multiple units (DMU).

== Train services ==
The station is served by the following KTM Intercity services:

- Ekspres Rakyat Timuran 26/27 Tumpat–JB Sentral
- Shuttle Timur 52/53/57/58 Tumpat–Gua Musang
- Shuttle Timur 55/56 Tumpat–Dabong
- Shuttle Timur 51/60 Tumpat–Kuala Lipis

== Around the station ==
- Tumpat railway depot
