= Johor Bahru Sentral station =

Transportation hub in Johor, Malaysia

JB Sentral

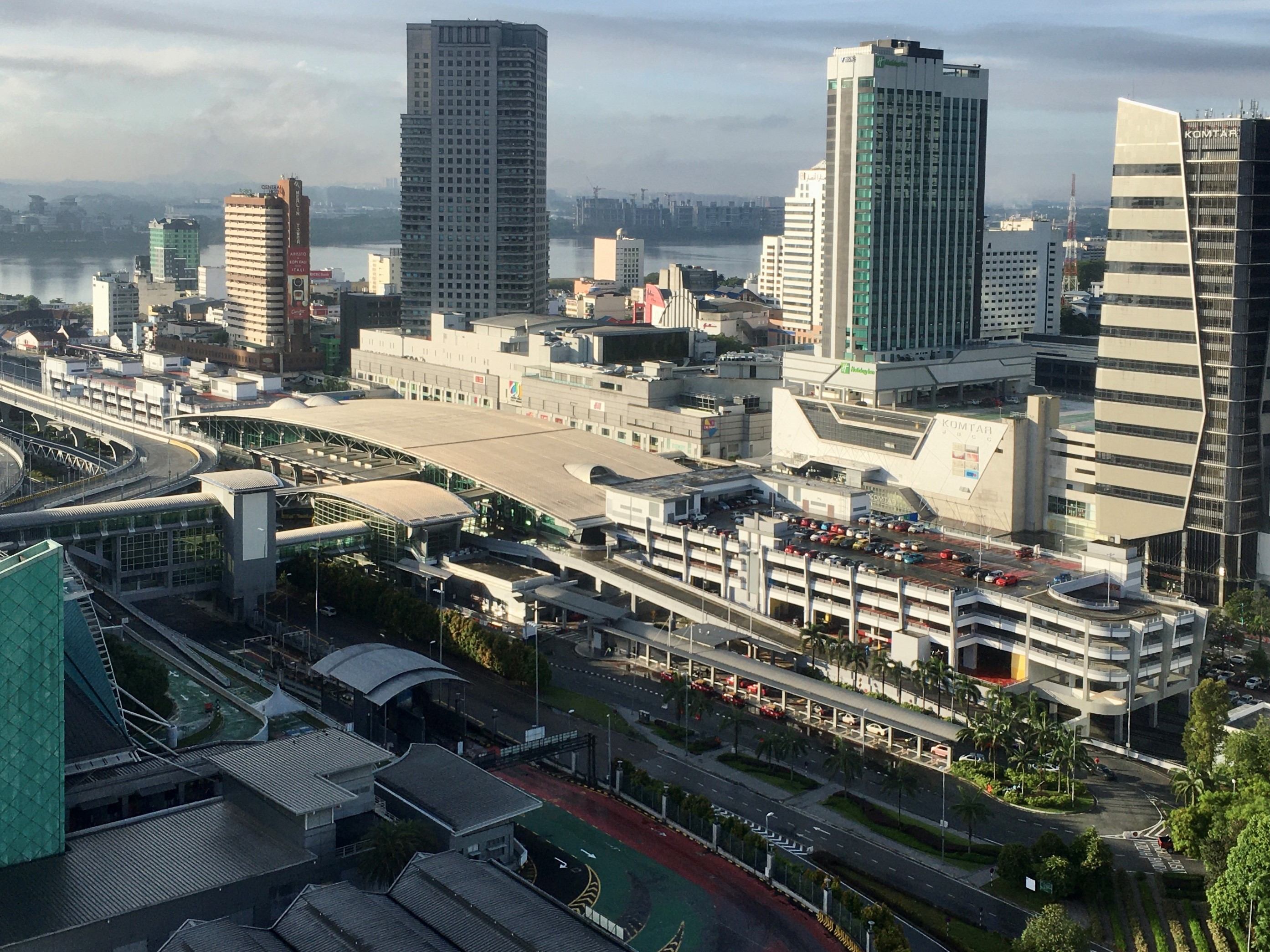
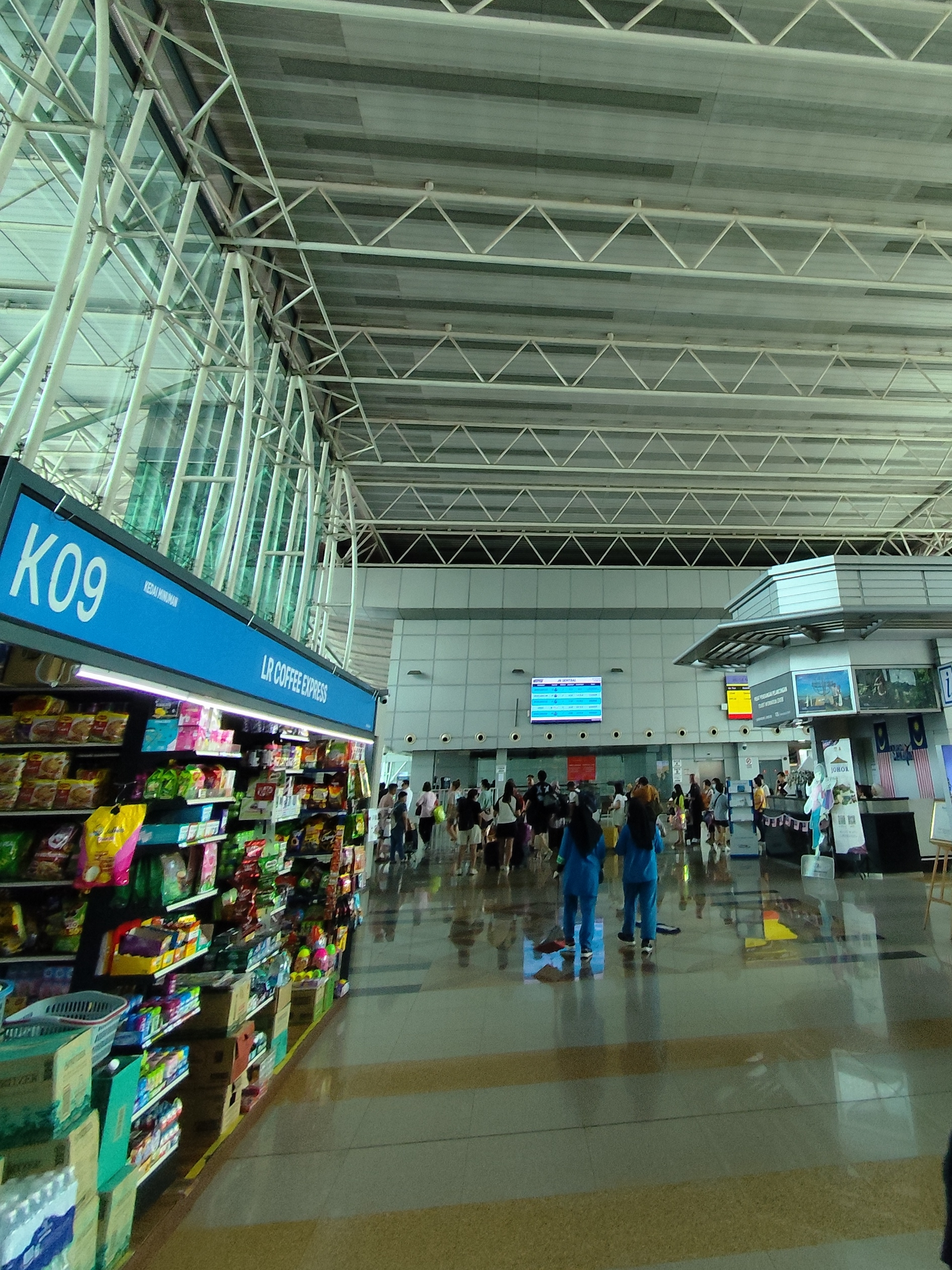
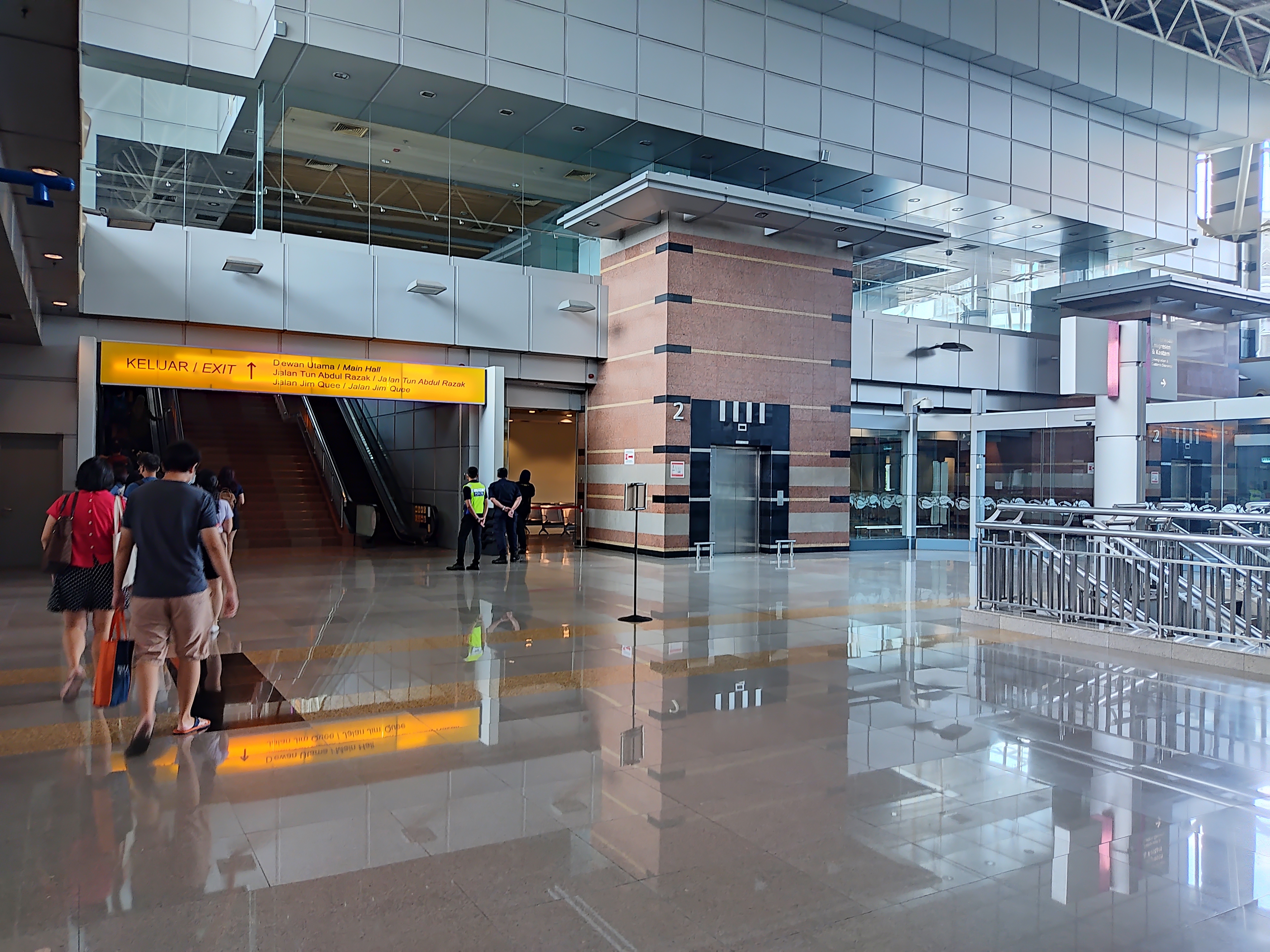
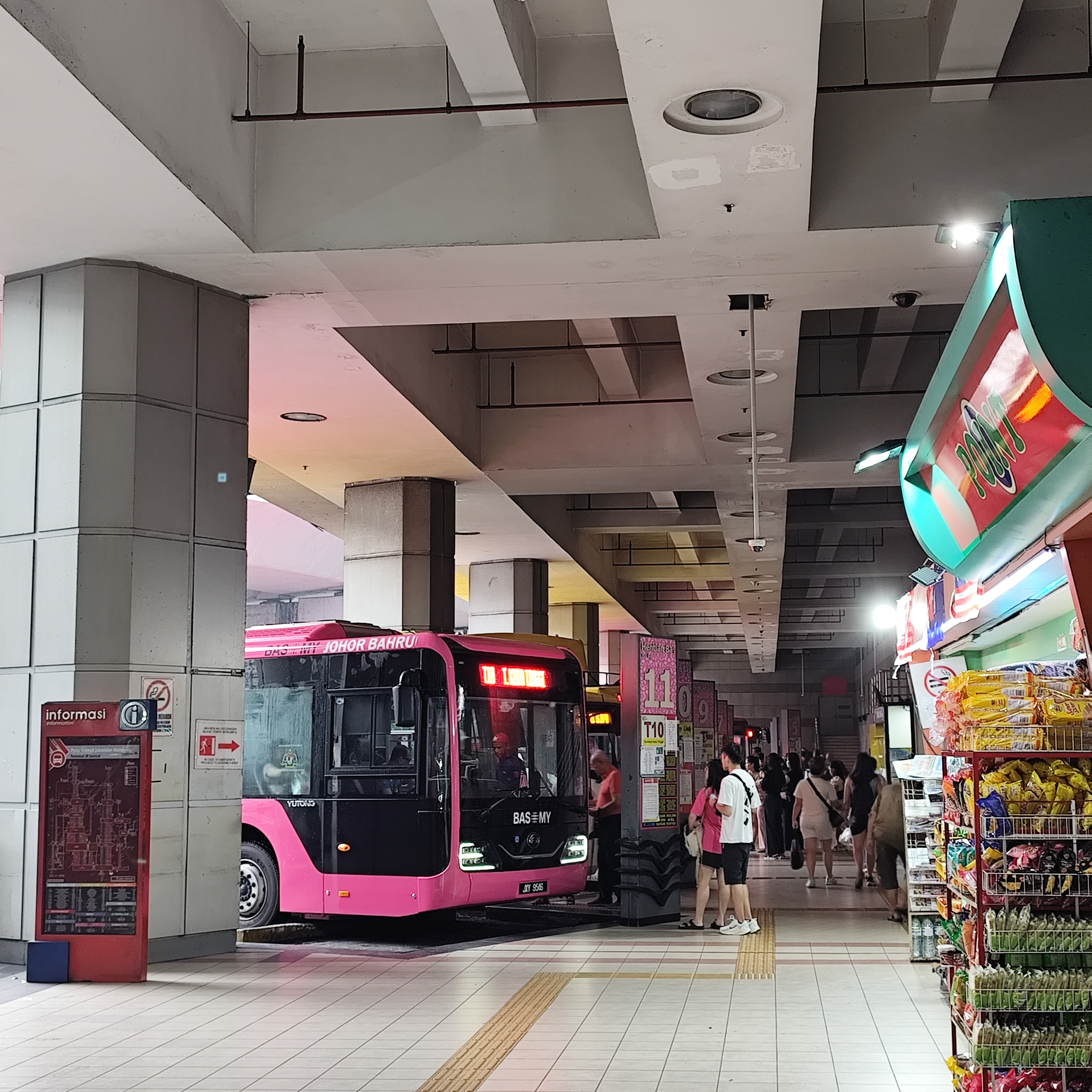
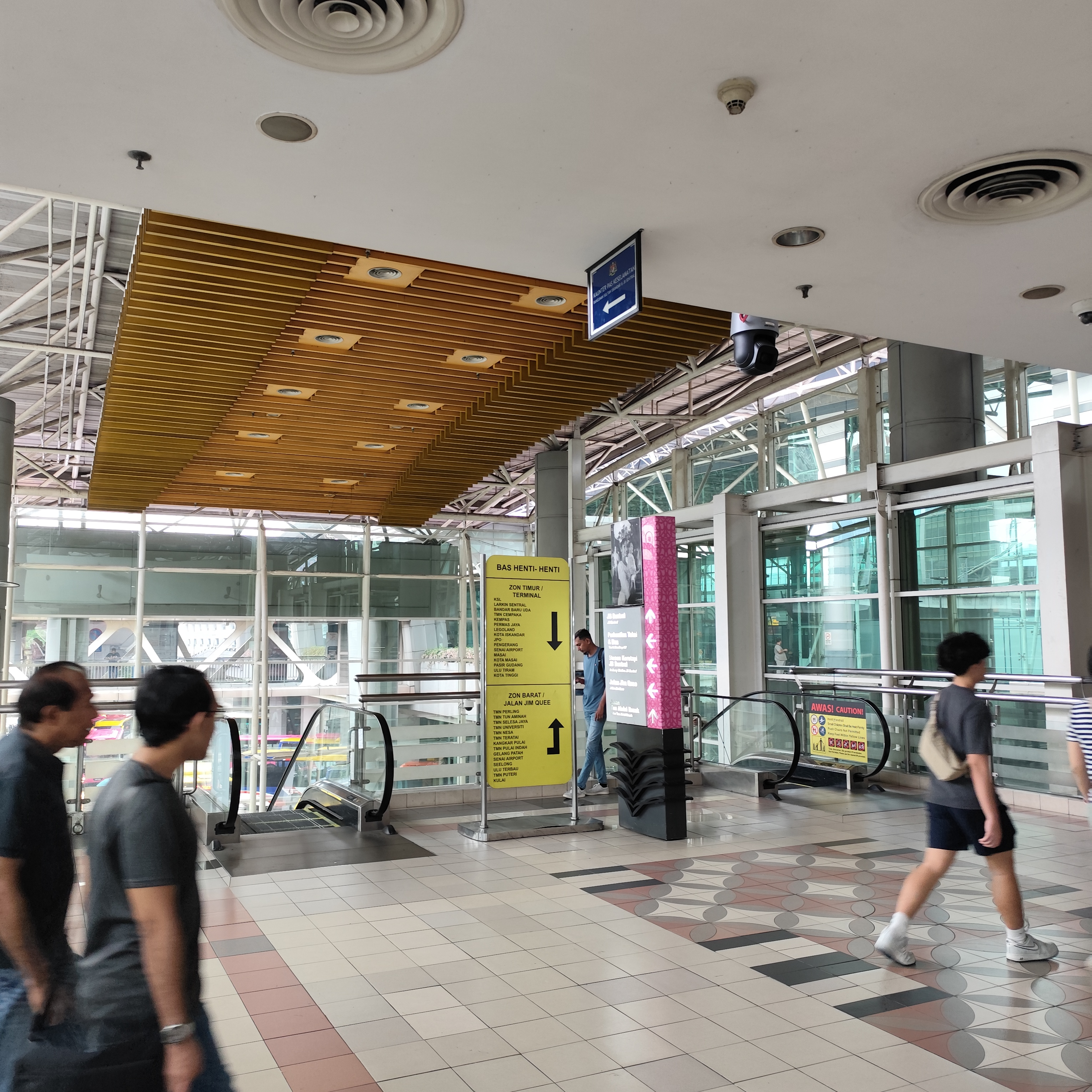
- From top, left to right: View of JB Sentral from the north-east with the Sultan Iskandar CIQ Complex and CBD in the background, station concourse, JB Sentral rail platform transfer hall, JB Sentral Bus Terminal located beneth the railway station concourse, and link bridge entrance to the bus terminal

General information
- Other names: Malay: جوهر بهرو سينترل (Jawi); Chinese: 新山中环; Tamil: ஜொகூர் பாரு சென்ட்ரல்
- Location: Southern Integrated Gateway, Bukit Chagar, Johor Bahru; Johor; Malaysia
- Coordinates: 1°27′45″N 103°45′53″E
- Owner: Property and Land Management Division of the Prime Minister’s Department
- Operator: Keretapi Tanah Melayu
- Line: West Coast Line
- Platforms: 3 island platforms
- Tracks: 6

Construction
- Structure type: Surface building
- Parking: Available
- Accessible: Yes

History
- Opened: 21 October 2010; 16 years ago
- Electrified: 12 December 2025; 10 months ago

Services
Preceding station	KTM Komuter	Following station
Kempas Baru towards Paloh	Paloh–JB Sentral Line	Terminus
Preceding station	ETS	Following station
Kempas Baru towards KL Sentral	KL Sentral–JB Sentral (Platinum)	Terminus
Kempas Baru towards Padang Besar	Padang Besar–JB Sentral (Platinum)	Terminus
Kempas Baru towards Butterworth	Butterworth–JB Sentral (Platinum)	Terminus
Kempas Baru towards Padang Besar	Padang Besar–JB Sentral (Gold)	Terminus
Preceding station	Keretapi Tanah Melayu (Intercity)	Following station
Kempas Baru towards Tumpat	Ekspres Rakyat Timuran	Terminus
Terminus	Shuttle Tebrau	Woodlands Terminus
Location

Johor Bahru Sentral (commonly abbreviated to JB Sentral) is an integrated transport hub in the Bukit Chagar suburb of Johor Bahru, the capital city of the state of Johor.

Inaugurated on 21 October 2010, it replaced the former Johor Bahru railway station located 200 m (660 ft) south of it. As part of the Southern Integrated Gateway, it is connected to the Sultan Iskandar Customs, Immigration and Quarantine Complex.

Johor Bahru Sentral is the southern terminus of KTM Intercity's Ekspres Rakyat Timuran service to Tumpat, as well as one of two stations on KTM Intercity's Shuttle Tebrau, the other being the Woodlands Train Checkpoint in Singapore across the Johor–Singapore Causeway. The station did not provide any train services from January to June 2022 due to the Gemas–Johor Bahru electrification and double-tracking project. Services only resumed in July 2022 after the new tracks between Johor Bahru and Kempas Baru were ready to use. Since 12 December 2025, Johor Bahru Sentral is also served by KTM ETS services.

Johor Bahru Sentral serves as the Malaysian immigration checkpoint for southbound rail passengers towards Woodlands. Northbound rail passengers from Woodlands are processed by Malaysian immigration and customs officers at Woodlands Train Checkpoint prior to boarding.

The station complex is the main hub for rail and bus transportation in Johor Bahru. It is the main station integrating KTM Intercity services, KTM ETS services, KTM Komuter Southern Sector services, as well as acting as the main transit bus terminal of Johor Bahru. In the future, it will be connected to the Bukit Chagar RTS Link station.

== Location ==
Johor Bahru Sentral station is located in the central area of Johor Bahru city, the capital of the state Johor, around Bukit Chagar. Being part of Southern Integrated Gateway, the connection between the CIQ complex and the station is just via the connecting walkway over Jalan Jim Quee to the east and is very near to Johor Causeway where the only train connection to Singapore lies straight to Woodlands Train Checkpoint. It is also connected to City Square shopping complex via walkway over Jalan Tun Razak in the west. Both roads also provide road connections to the station, with Jalan Jim Quee also provide road access for motorcars from/to Singapore as it directly connected to the CIQ complex.

== History ==
=== Johore Wooden Railway ===
It was said that the history of Johor railway developments started in the 1869 when Abu Bakar of Johor (then known as Maharaja) officiated the construction of the Johore Railway, which lines are planned to be built northwards towards Mount Pulai, 18 miles (29.0 km) from the terminus here. While the line was indeed built from Johor Bahru and it has been operating since 1875 for the first 6 miles (9.7 km) of construction, it was not clear for what function it served and if Johor Bahru had a proper station standing here until 1889 when the railway was reported defunct.

=== Old FMSR era station ===
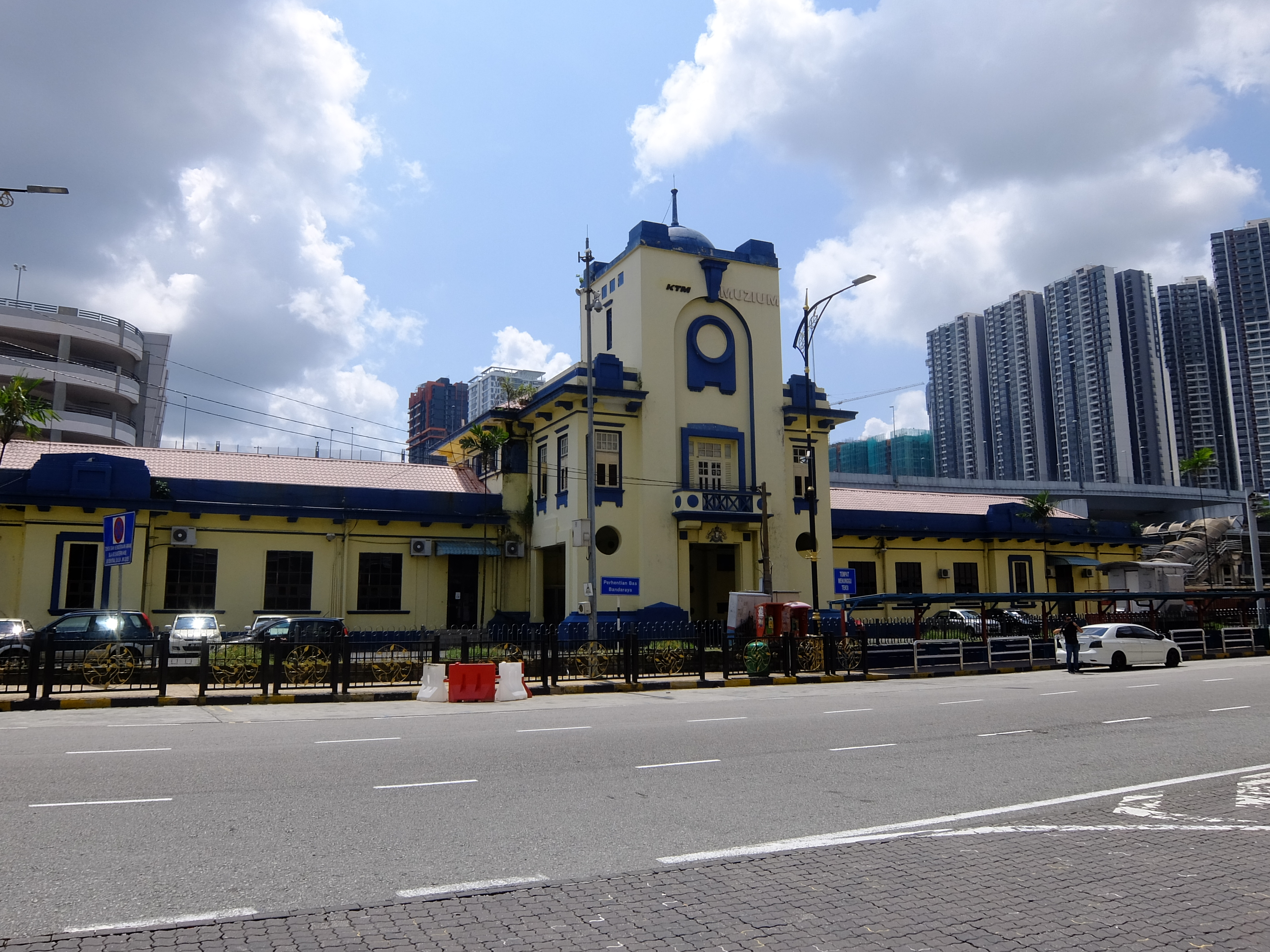
Former Johor Bahru railway station opened in 1909, now turned into the KTM Museum, but never open to the public.

The former Johor Bahru railway station under Johore State Railway was opened in 1909 in conjunction with the completion of the final West Coast main link (which will later form the KTM West Coast Line) sector from Gemas to Johor Bahru after a 5-year construction period starting in 1904. As there was no land access to Singapore yet at that time, Johor Bahru used to be the southernmost terminus for Federated Malay States Railways (FMSR) trains on the Malay Peninsula. However, the FMSR had been running combined train-and-ferry services between both the peninsular railway network and the then-Singapore Government Railways network. Both the Johore Government Railways and Singapore Government Railways were integrated under FMSR administration on 1912.

The station is able to serve services from linked FMSR railways of Malaya especially from the West Coast states up to Penang, and to Pahang on the east. As the FMSR network gradually spread, the old railway station was served by trains to and from Kedah, Perlis and Kelantan as well. It later able to serve trains up to Bangkok when the FMSR network connected to State Railway of Thailand (SRT) network via Padang Besar in 1918, and with the completion of the East Coast sector to Gua Musang in 1931, the East Coast link (which will later form the KTM East Coast Line) was connected to the SRT via Su-ngai Kolok.

After the Johor–Singapore Causeway was completed in 1923, trains were able to travel across the Johor Strait and southwards to Tank Road in Singapore. The trains would later terminate at Tanjong Pagar on Keppel Road after its opening in 1932. Johor Bahru has since become one of the main stations of the rail network serving express and mail trains of the railway services especially between the town and Singapore.

The station would again become the southern terminus of the FMSR train network when the Japanese occupation of Singapore strikes in 1942 forced the British to blow up the Causeway in order to slow down the Imperial Japanese Army's entry into Singapore, severing the only train connection to Singapore. The connection was restored in 1946 after British control was reinstated in both states. Tanjong Pagar would continue to be the FMSR West Coast Line's southern terminus until 2011. In 1948, Johor Bahru station came under the newly-formed Malayan Railways and later after independence, Keretapi Tanah Melayu (KTM).

As politics changed the state of the regions which ultimately made Singapore and Malaya, later Malaysia, two different countries, Johor Bahru station became part of the international border between the two nations. However, local and express trains remained running uninterrupted between the two countries with the station maintaining its position as an important stop for trains. For a while in the 1980s, it also serve Railbus service between Kulai and Singapore.

Different from the road entries of the Causeway, Johor Bahru station, which facilitated railway entries between the two countries, did not really have any immigration and customs clearance facilities for several decades, despite the first border control regulations between the countries were set up in 1967, as immigration and customs clearance were settled in Tanjong Pagar station. However, after the signing of the Malaysia–Singapore Points of Agreement of 1990 by Malaysia and Singapore, disputes about the agreement and border controls rose, forcing the station to provide an immigration and customs clearance for Singapore-bound trains while the immigration and customs clearance for Malaysia-bound trains remained in Tanjong Pagar station. This practice remained even after the opening of the new Johor Bahru Sentral station. Johor Bahru Sentral eventually replaced the old Johor Bahru station, taking on the latter's immigration and customs clearance responsibilities for southbound trains. The old station closed on 21 October 2010, with proposed plans to turn it into a railway museum.

=== Johor Bahru Sentral ===
Johor Bahru Sentral is one of the facilities of Malaysia's Southern Integrated Gateway which aims to provide an integrated entry hub for vehicles from Singapore to enter Malaysia via Johor Bahru, alongside the new Sultan Iskandar Customs, Immigration and Quarantine (CIQ) complex and plans for a new bridge to replace the Johor-Singapore Causeway. While plans for the bridge were cancelled indefinitely, the new CIQ complex opened in 2008 for vehicular access. The whole project costed RM2.5 billion.

Train services at Johor Bahru Sentral began on 21 October 2010, with Ibrahim Ismail of Johor officiating the opening ceremony. The station has since taken over the role as the main railway station of Johor Bahru. Following the closure of Tanjong Pagar station on 1 July 2011, Malaysia's and Singapore's immigration and customs clearance for northbound trains were moved and have since been operating from the Woodlands Train Checkpoint, becoming the new southern terminus of KTM's West Coast Line. The Woodlands Train Checkpoint also houses Singapore's immigration and customs clearance for southbound trains, while Malaysia's counterpart has since been operating from Johor Bahru Sentral until this day.

Although major KTM Intercity trains stopped here in the early years of its opening, the station later saw a sharp decrease in passengers causing many of the major West Coast services to be reduced and later terminated in 2016. These services would later be replaced by KTM ETS services. Up until 31st December 2025, only three trips of the former Ekspres Selatan up Gemas and one trip of the Ekspres Rakyat Timuran to Tumpat in Kelantan were serving this station. Cross-border services, which has since been branded as Shuttle Tebrau, runs exclusively between Johor Bahru Sentral and the Woodlands Train Checkpoint, with 18 Woodlands-bound trips and 13 Johor Bahru-bound trips.

The COVID-19 pandemic also affected services, with some services being temporarily suspended, but were gradually restored by 2022. Between January and June 2022, the station was closed as part of Gemas-Johor Bahru electrification and double tracking project (EDTP), the final phase of the electrification and double tracking of the West Coast Line. During this time, Shuttle Tebrau services were temporarily suspended. The station reopened in mid-June 2022 with the resumption of the Shuttle Tebrau service, and both the Ekspres Selatan and Ekspres Rakyat Timuran returned in July 2022. The EDTP was officially completed and KTM ETS services were officially extended to Johor Bahru Sentral on 12 December 2025, becoming the new southern terminus of the KTM ETS network. On 1 January 2026, KTM Intercity's Ekspres Selatan service to Gemas was officially terminated, to make way for more KTM ETS services. The Shuttle Tebrau service will also be terminated in the future, following the projected completion of the Johor Bahru–Singapore Rapid Transit System in 2027. This will mark KTM's complete withdrawal from Singapore.

== Station components ==
=== Concourse area (second floor) ===
The concourse area is a major thoroughfare for pedestrians due to walkways linking it with both the Sultan Iskandar CIQ complex and the shopping centres on the other side of Jalan Tun Abdul Razak. As such, it contains a tourist information centre, various convenience stores, phone shops, souvenir shops, a Kentucky Fried Chicken restaurant and some smaller eateries alongside the waiting area and ticket vending machines for the KTM trains.

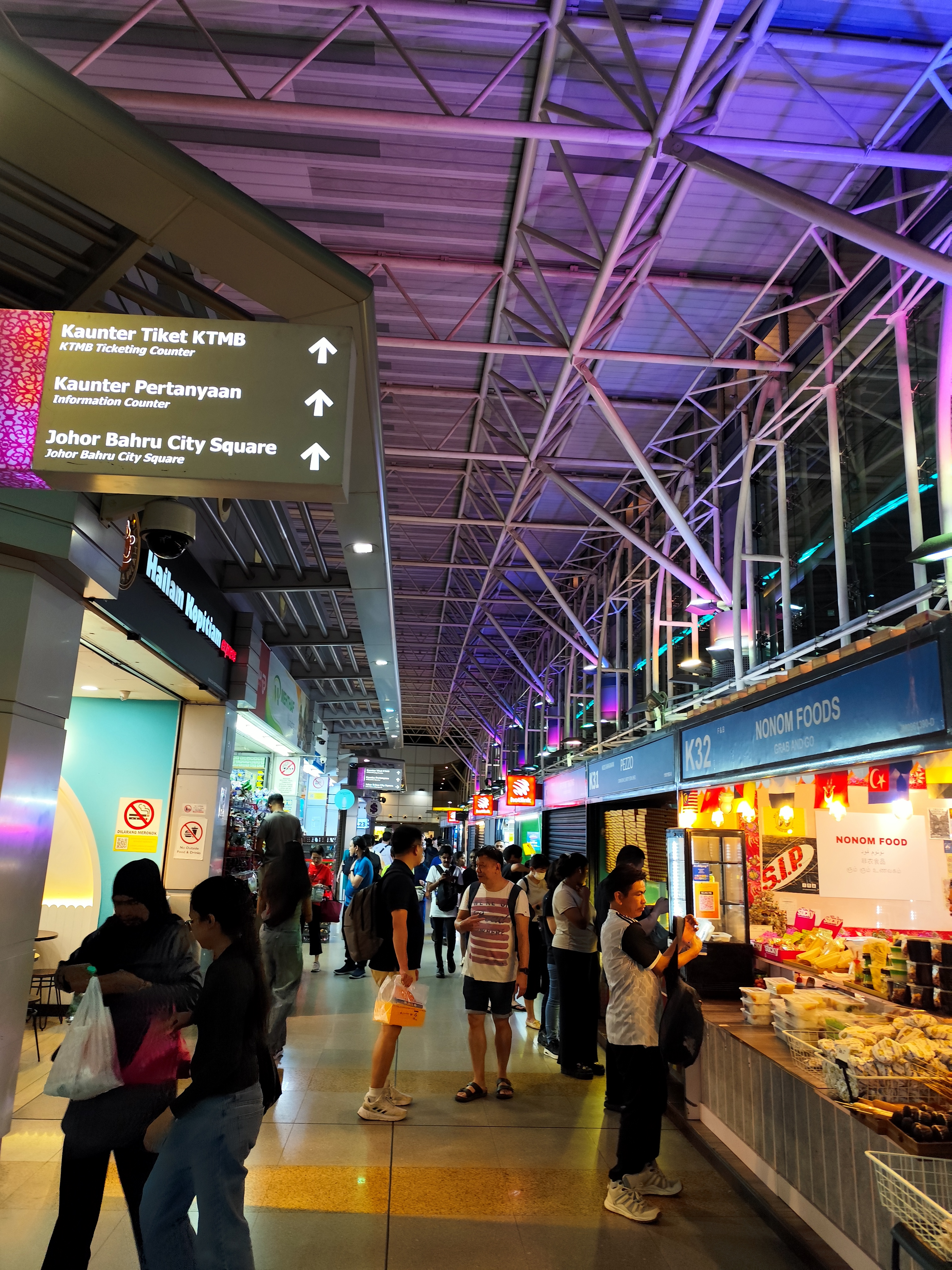
Concourse area of JB Sentral Station and retail shops siding the linkbridge across Jalan Tun Abdul Razak to Johor Bahru City Square, Komtar JBCC and future Bukit Chagar RTS Station.

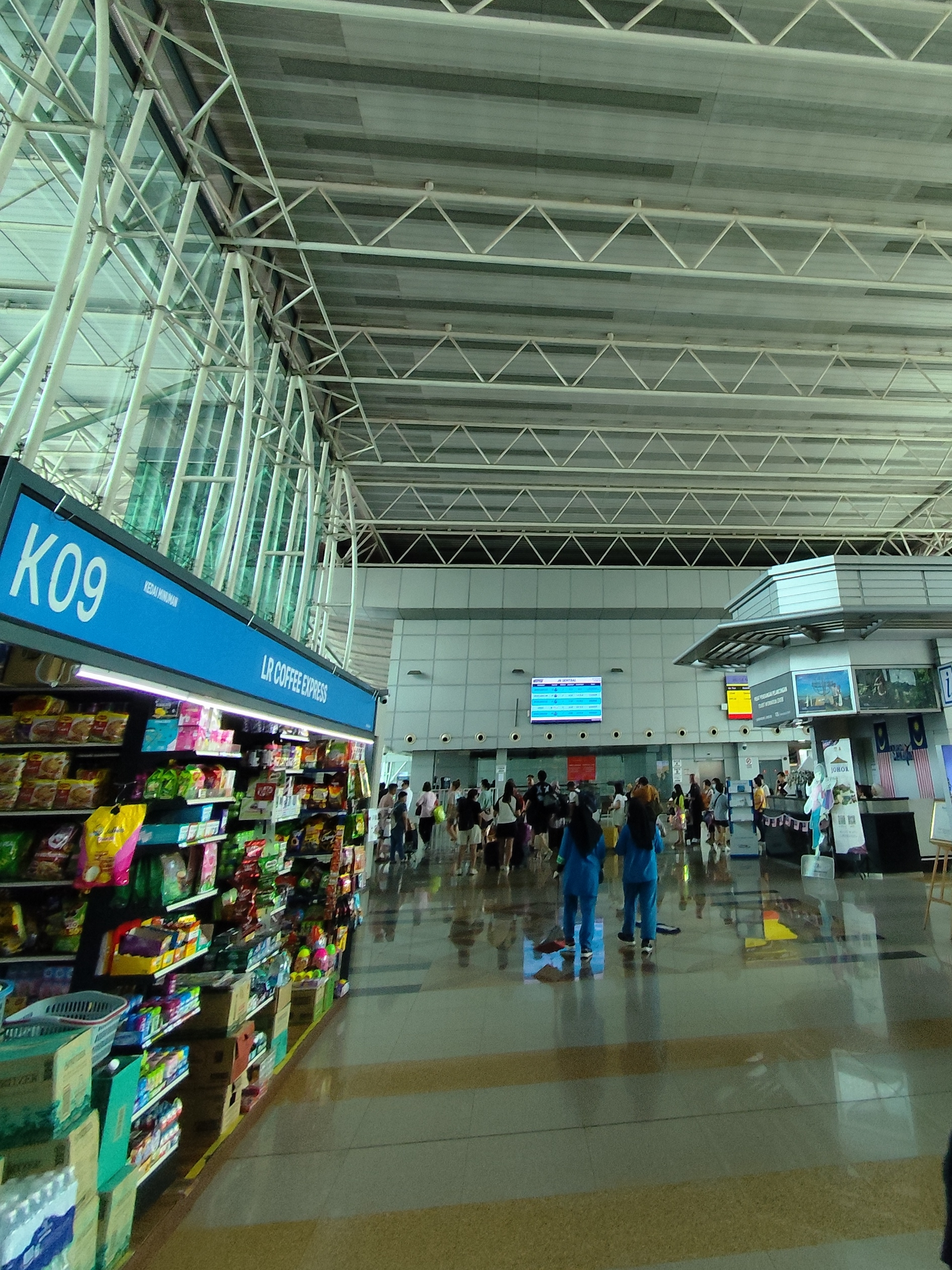
Concourse area of JB Sentral Station and retail shops siding the drop-off point and linkbridge to Sultan Iskandar Building and R&F Mall.

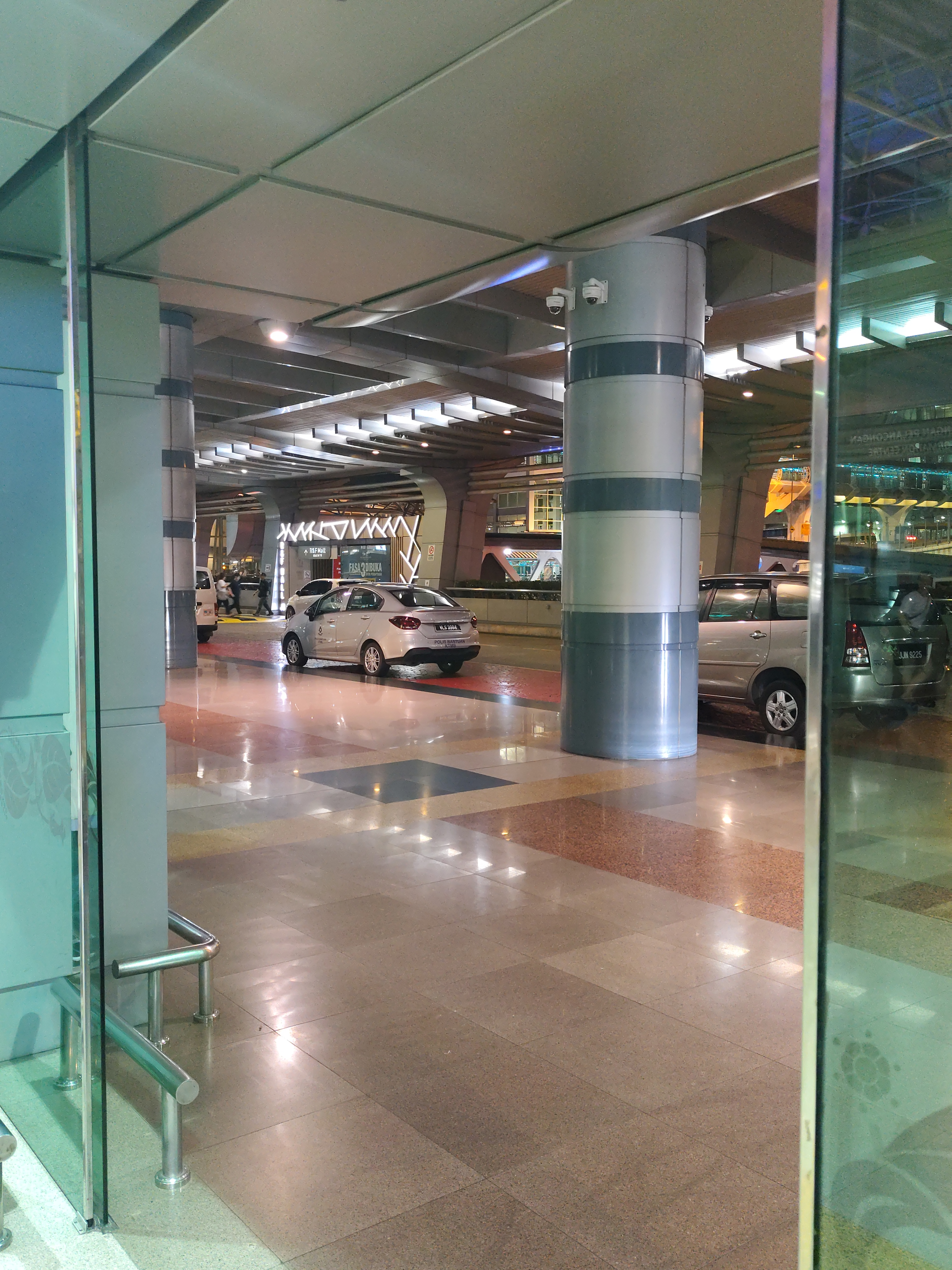
Drop-off point, with the entrance of Link bridge to R&F Mall in the background.

=== Passenger and platform areas (first and ground floor) ===
These two floors are for KTM passengers only; tickets are checked on the second floor before admittance. The first floor is split between a waiting area for KTM Intercity Ekspres Rakyat Timuran, KTM Komuter and KTM ETS passengers (entering from Gate B), and a Malaysian customs and immigration clearance area for Shuttle Tebrau passengers (entering from Gate A).

The station has 6 platforms in a 3 island-platform formation. Platforms 1 and 2 serve Ekspres Rakyat Timuran and KTM Komuter trains, Platform 3 and 4 serve ETS trains while Platforms 5 and 6 serve Shuttle Tebrau trains.

=== Bus and taxi hubs (ground floor, outside building) ===
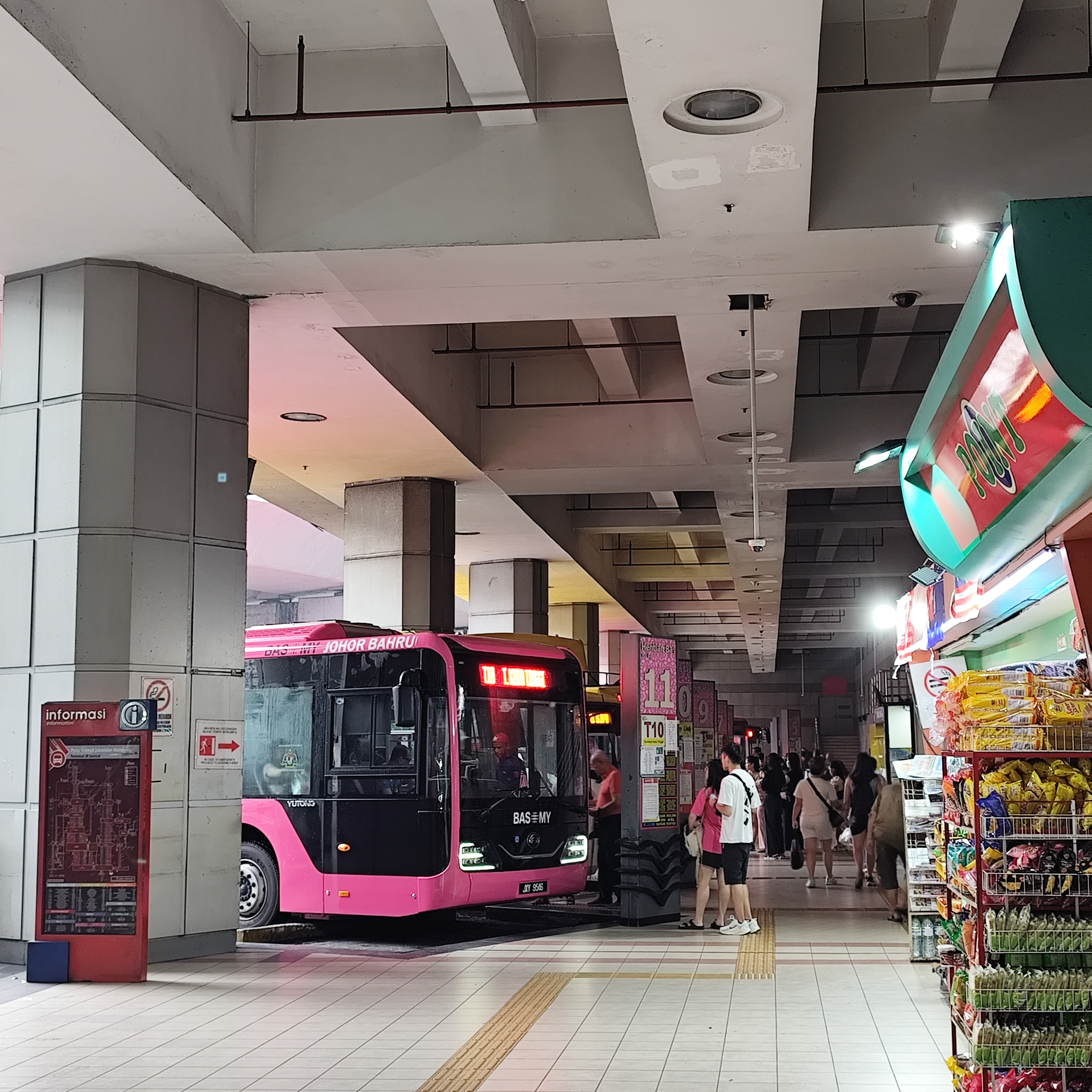
JB Sentral bus terminal

The Johor Bahru Sentral building features a local bus terminal located on the Jalan Jim Quee side. It serves the local city area, with connections to Kulai, Skudai, Permas Jaya, Pasir Gudang, Kota Tinggi and Larkin Sentral.

As of 2026, the BAS.MY (Pink Bus) service, an initiative by the federal Ministry of Transport, operates 13 routes departing from Johor Bahru Sentral. Previously known as myBAS, the service was rebranded on September 30, 2025, with an increased number of buses and new routes. The Bas Muafakat Johor service, managed by the Johor State Government, has two routes passing through JB Sentral. These bus services are operated by Handal Indah (Causeway Link). Additionally, three cross-border bus routes from Singapore (160, 170X, 950) stop at the Johor Bahru Checkpoint before returning to Singapore. Taxi stands are also available from both sides of the station entrances, but cross-border taxis are only limited to the Jalan Tun Razak side.

Route Type	Platform	Code	Origin	Destination
BAS.MY_Logo	11	J10	Johor Bahru Sentral	Kota Tinggi Bus Terminal
BAS.MY_Logo	10	J11	Johor Bahru Sentral	Bandar Dato' Onn AEON Mall
BAS.MY_Logo	9	J13	Johor Bahru Sentral	Larkin Sentral
BAS.MY_Logo	8	J20	Johor Bahru Sentral	Masai Bus Terminal
BAS.MY_Logo	7	J22	Johor Bahru Sentral	Pasir Gudang Taman Scientex
BAS.MY_Logo	6	J30	Johor Bahru Sentral	Kulai Bus Terminal
BAS.MY_Logo	5	J31	Johor Bahru Sentral	Taman Pulai Mutiara
BAS.MY_Logo	4	J32	Johor Bahru Sentral	Taman Selesa Jaya Flat
BAS.MY_Logo	3	J34	Johor Bahru Sentral	Skudai Sutera Mall
BAS.MY_Logo	2	J100	Johor Bahru Sentral	KSL City Mall
BAS.MY_Logo	1	J33	Johor Bahru Sentral	Taman Tan Sri Yaakob
BAS.MY_Logo	Roadside	J21	Johor Bahru Sentral	Permas Jaya Bus Hub
BAS.MY_Logo	Roadside	J15	Johor Bahru Sentral	Mid Valley Southkey
Bas_Muafakat_Johor_Logo	Roadside	P101	Larkin Sentral	Johor Bahru Sentral
Bas_Muafakat_Johor_Logo	Roadside	P102	PPR Sri Stulang	Johor Bahru Sentral
Bas_Muafakat_Johor_Logo	Roadside	P311	Pasir Gudang Bus Terminal	Johor Bahru Sentral
Other local buses	1	AA1	Johor Bahru Sentral	Senai International Airport
Other local buses	1	JPO1	Johor Bahru Sentral	Johor Premium Outlets
Other local buses	Roadside	CG1	Johor Bahru Sentral	Country Garden Danga Bay
Other local buses	Roadside	CT	Johor Bahru Sentral	Bayu Puteri
Other local buses	Roadside	RnF	Johor Bahru Sentral	R&F Mall
SG_Bus_Logo	Roadside	160	Jurong Town Hall Bus Interchange	Johor Bahru Sentral
SG_Bus_Logo	Roadside	170X	Kranji MRT station	Johor Bahru Sentral
SG_Bus_Logo	Roadside	950	Woodlands Temporary Bus Interchange	Johor Bahru Sentral

== Around the station ==
- Johor Bahru City Square
- R&F Mall (Johor Bahru)
- Komtar JBCC
- Persada Johor International Convention Centre
- Sultan Iskandar Building
- KTM Museum (formerly the Johor Bahru railway station)
- UTC Johor

== See also ==
- Kuala Lumpur Sentral station
- List of bus routes in Johor Bahru
