= Johor Bahru Conurbation =

Johor Bahru Conurbation Konurbasi Johor Bahru
- Metropolitan area
- Southern Conurbation; Konurbasi Selatan
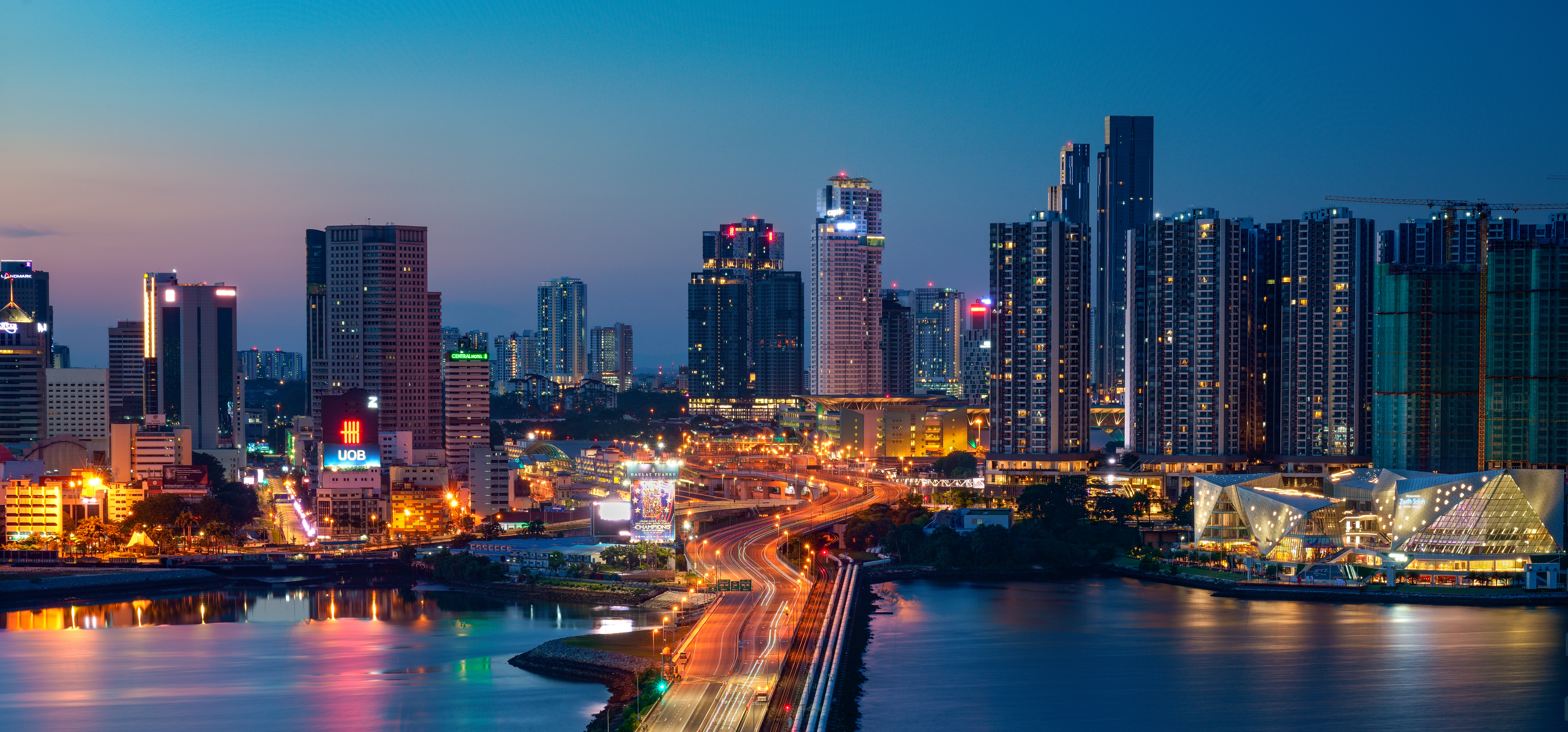
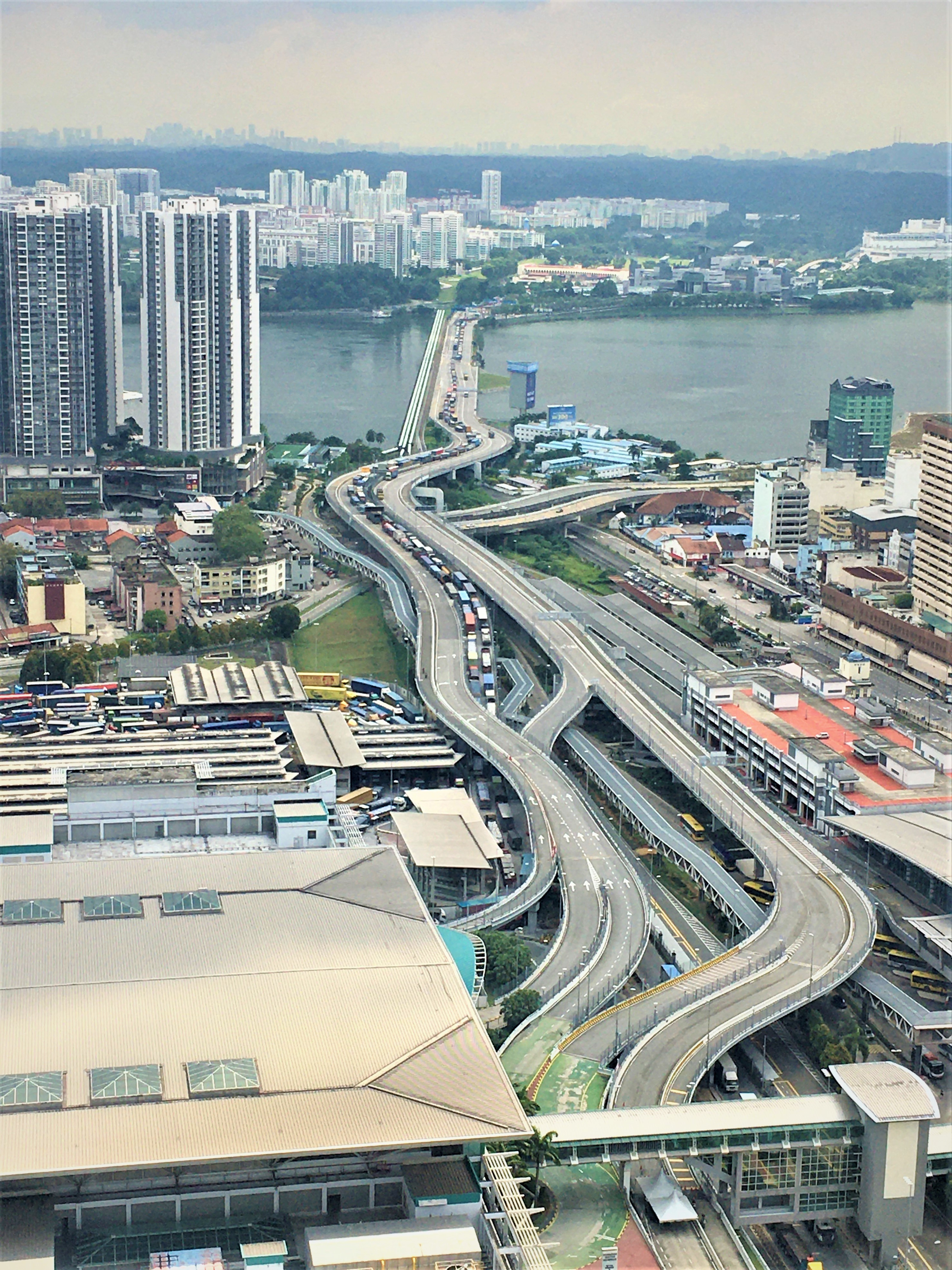
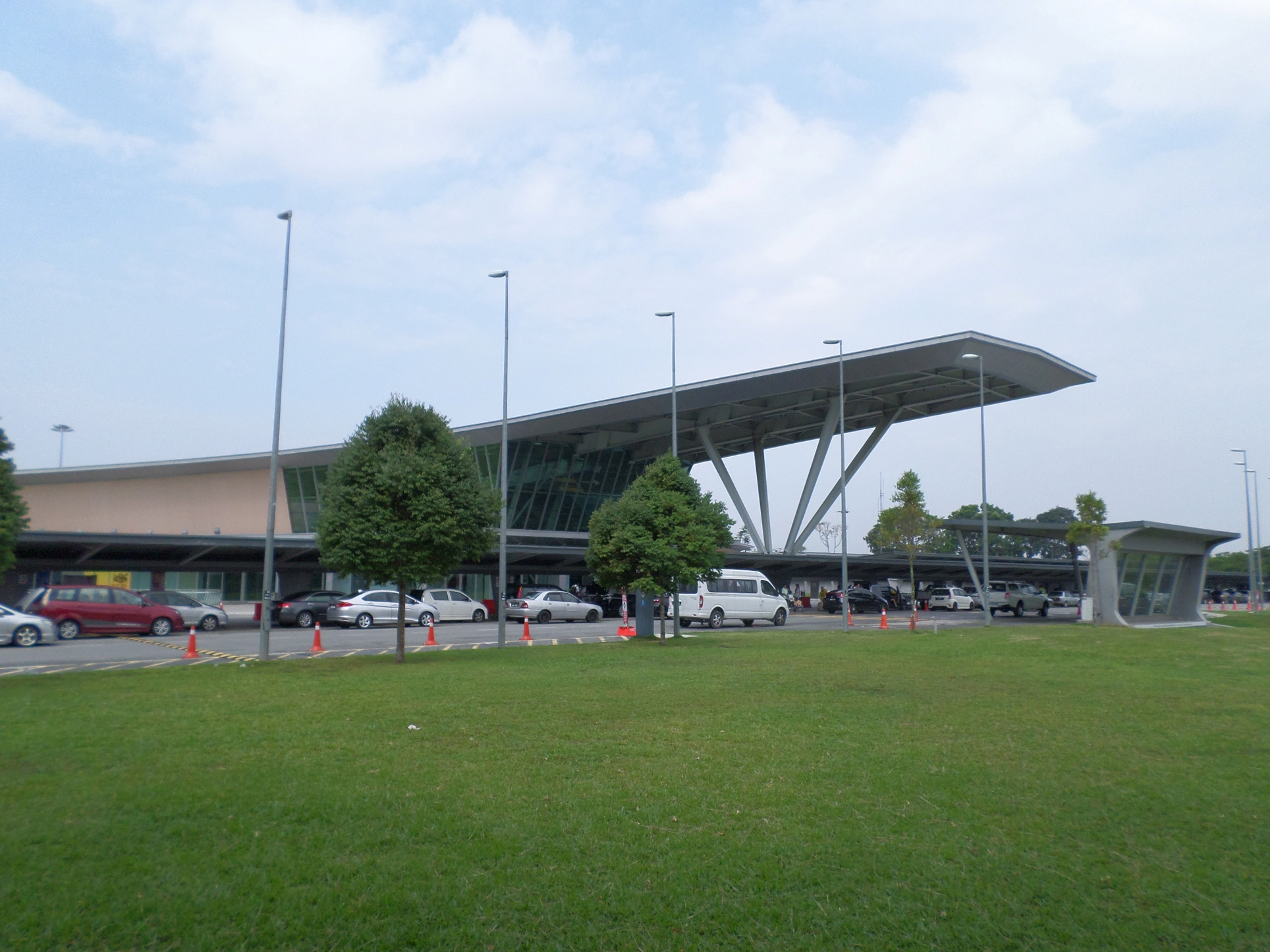
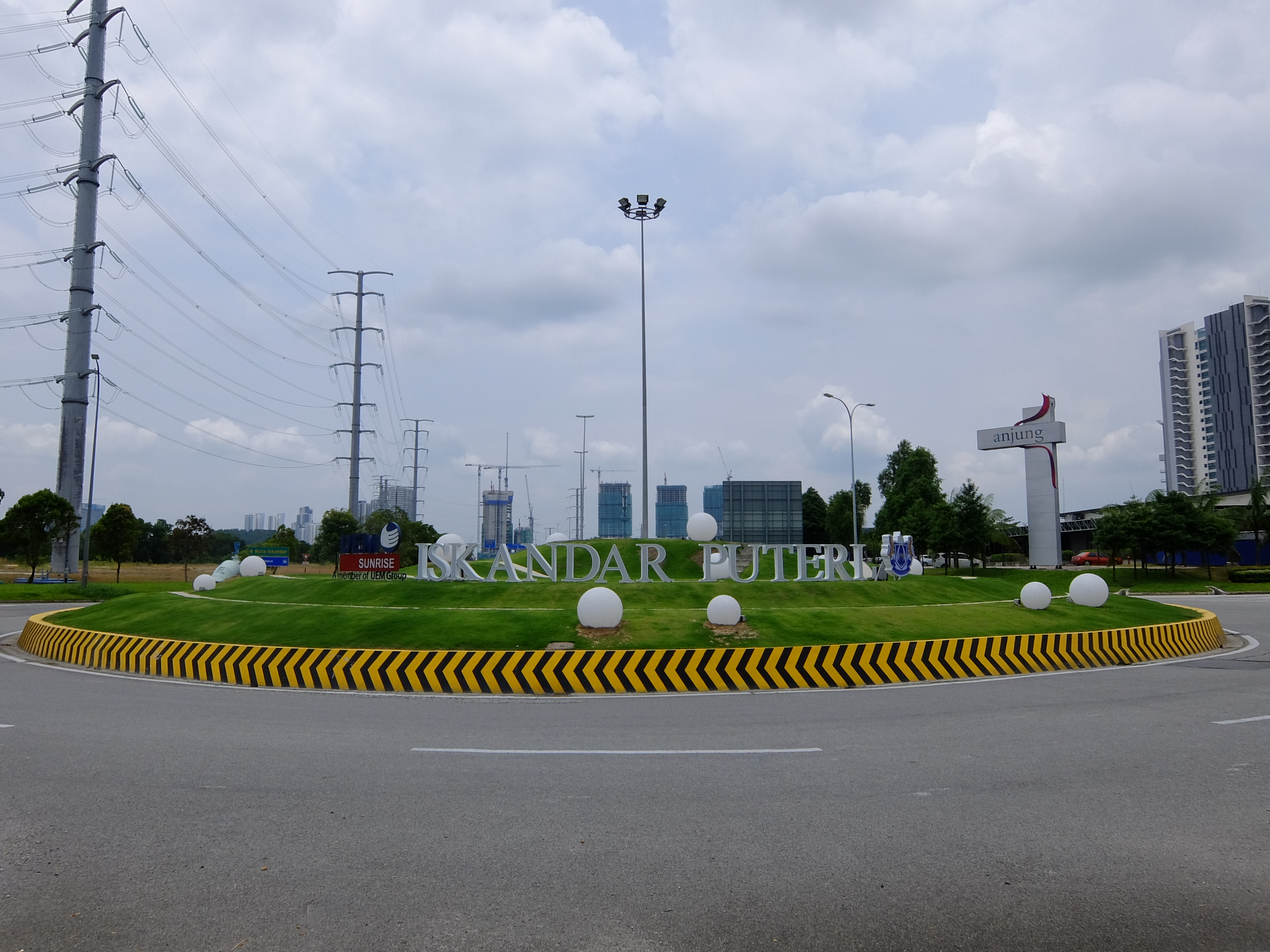
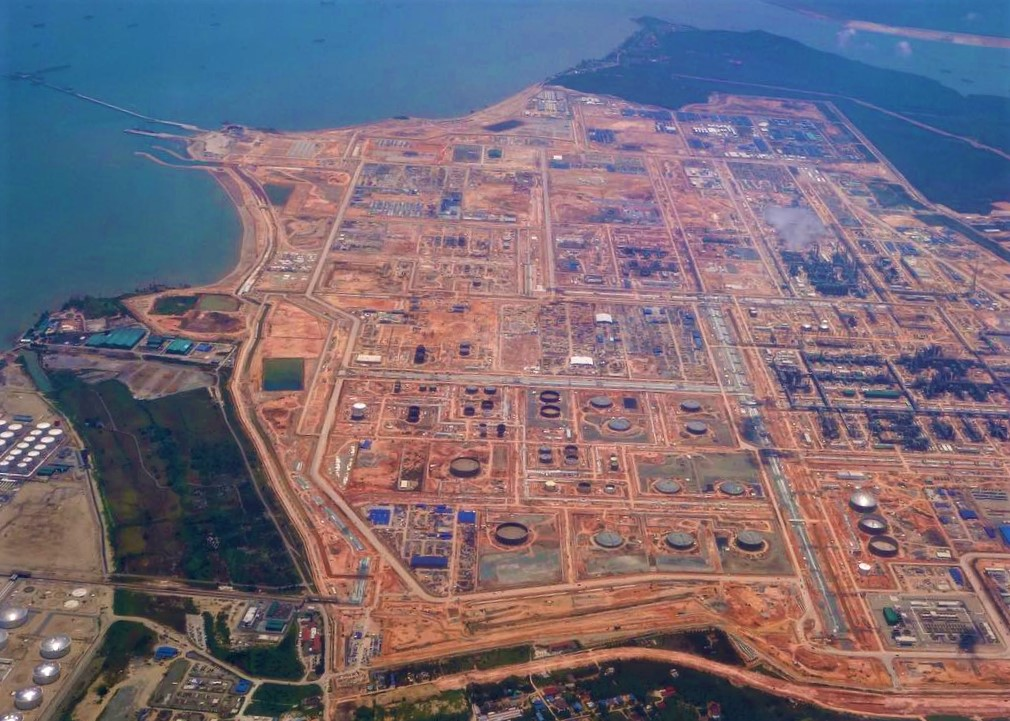
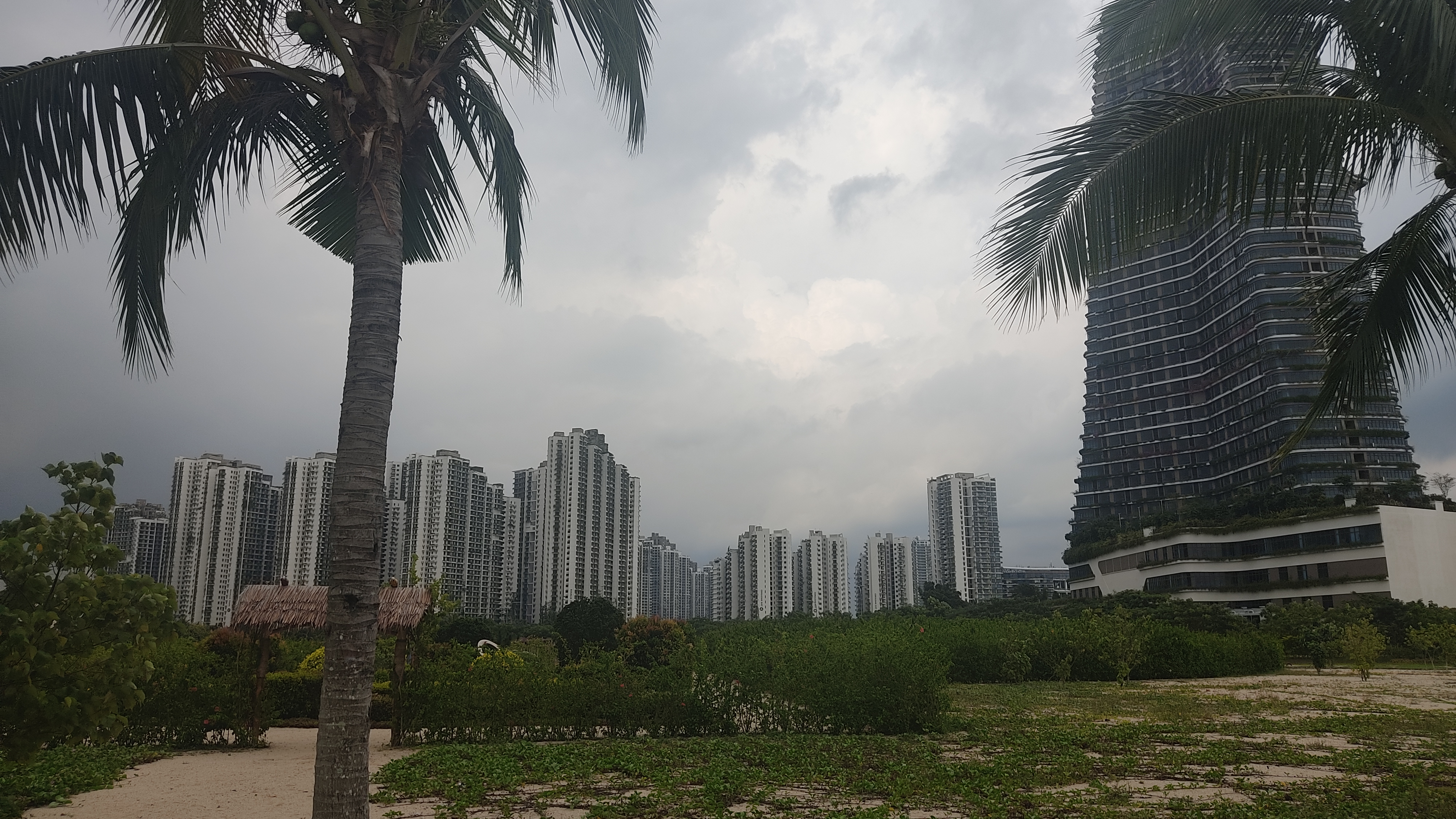
- Johor Bahru CBD Southern Integrated Gateway Senai International Airport Iskandar Puteri PIPC, Pengerang Forest City
- Country: Malaysia
- State: Johor
- Core city: Johor Bahru
- Other major towns: Kulai; Iskandar Puteri; Pasir Gudang

Area
  - Total: 4,954 km^{2} (1,913 sq mi)

Population (2020)
  - Total: 2,487,601
  - Density: 502.1/km^{2} (1,301/sq mi)
- Time zone: UTC+8 (Malaysian Standard Time)
- Postcode: 79xxx - 82xxx
- Area codes: +6-07-2, +6-07-3, +6-07-5

The Johor Bahru Conurbation (Malay: Konurbasi Johor Bahru, also known as the Southern Conurbation (Malay: Konurbasi Selatan) in the National Physical Plan, is the built-up urban or metropolitan area within and around Johor Bahru in the Malaysian state of Johor, and roughly corresponds to the Iskandar Malaysia corridor.

Encompassing all of Johor Bahru District, Kulai District, and parts of Pontian and Kota Tinggi Districts, where they are all located in Johor, it is home to over 2.4 million people as of 2020, one of the largest in the country, as well as the largest metropolitan area in Malaysia without spanning other states, federal territory or country.

== Definition ==
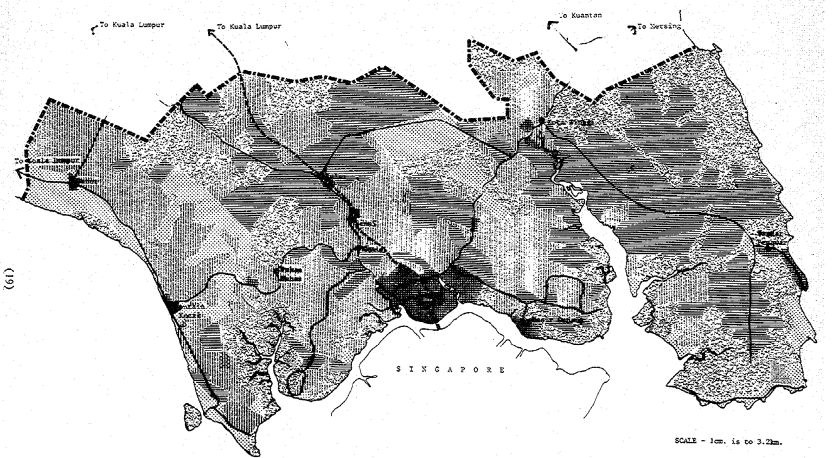
Local government areas within the Johor Bahru Conurbation

Introduced in the 4th edition of Malaysia's National Physical Plan, the conurbation encompasses Johor Bahru, Senai, Skudai, Kulai, Pasir Gudang, Tanjung Pelepas, Pontian, Kota Tinggi, Desaru, Pengerang and Bandar Tenggara.

== Population by local government area ==
The population table is based on the official census of 2020 for the local government areas within the Johor Bahru Conurbation.

Local government area	Local government body	Population
Johor Bahru	Johor Bahru City Council	858,118
Iskandar Puteri	Iskandar Puteri City Council	575,977
Pasir Gudang	Pasir Gudang City Council	312,437
Kulai	Kulai Municipal Council	329,497
Pontian	Pontian Municipal Council	173,318
Kota Tinggi	Kota Tinggi District Council	222,382
Johor Bahru Conurbation (Southern Conurbation)		2,487,601

== Transportation ==
=== Rail ===
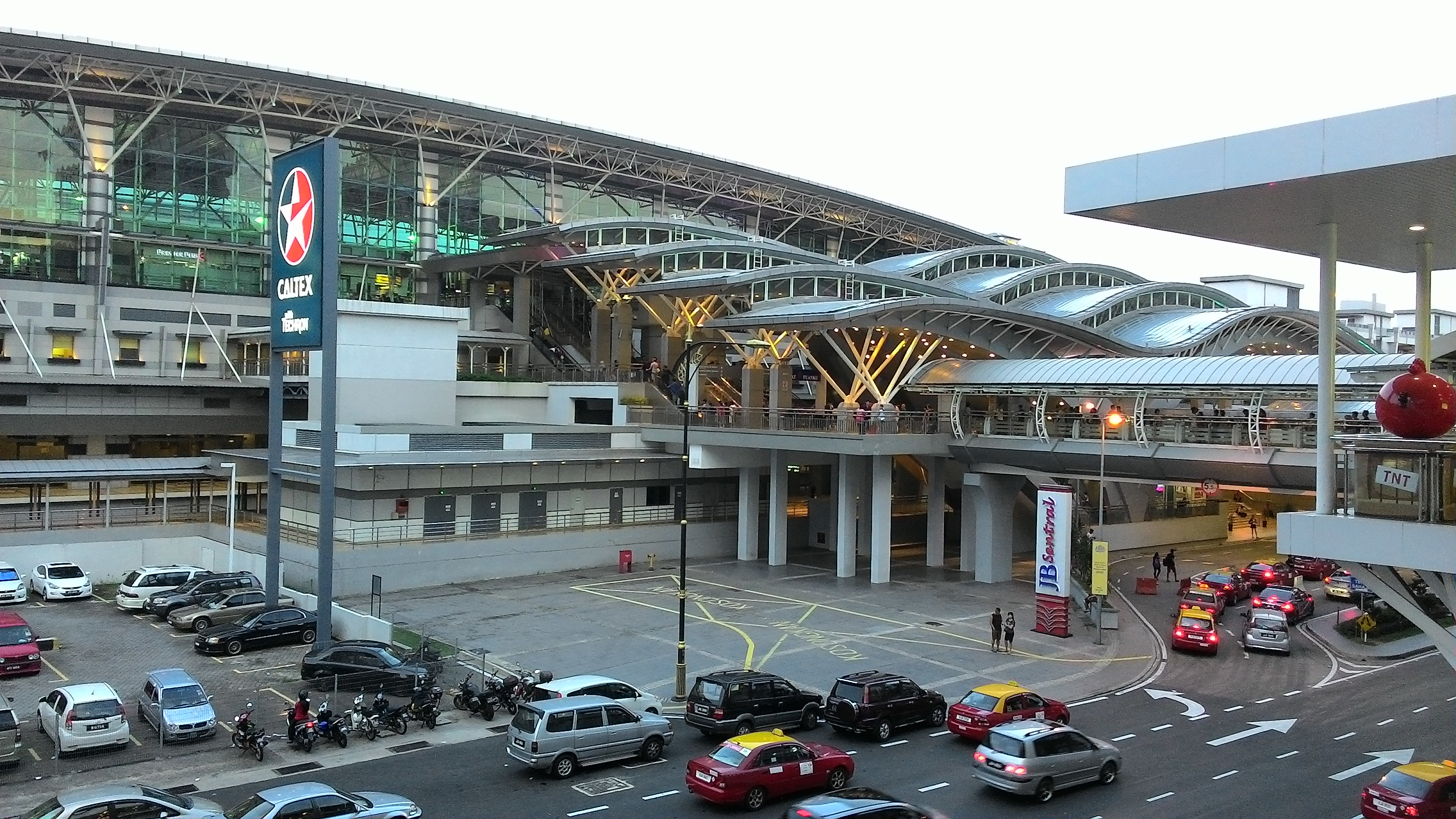
Johor Bahru Sentral railway station

The conurbation is served by three railway stations of the KTMB, which are Johor Bahru Sentral, Kempas Baru and Kulai. It is also linked to Woodlands, Singapore via the Shuttle Tebrau service, and it will be supplanted by the newer Johor Bahru-Singapore RTS.

=== Road ===
The Johor Bahru Eastern Dispersal Link Expressway, Pasir Gudang Highway, Johor Bahru East Coast Highway, Iskandar Coastal Highway, Skudai–Pontian Highway, Skudai Highway, Johor Bahru–Kota Tinggi Highway and Senai–Desaru Expressway links most of the cities and towns in Johor Bahru Conurbation. It is connected to other districts in Johor and other states in Peninsular Malaysia via the North–South Expressway, being the expressway's southern terminus. The conurbation is also linked to Singapore via Johor–Singapore Causeway and Malaysia–Singapore Second Link.

=== Sea ===
Ports in the conurbation includes Johor Port, Tanjung Langsat Port and Port of Tanjung Pelepas.

=== Airport ===
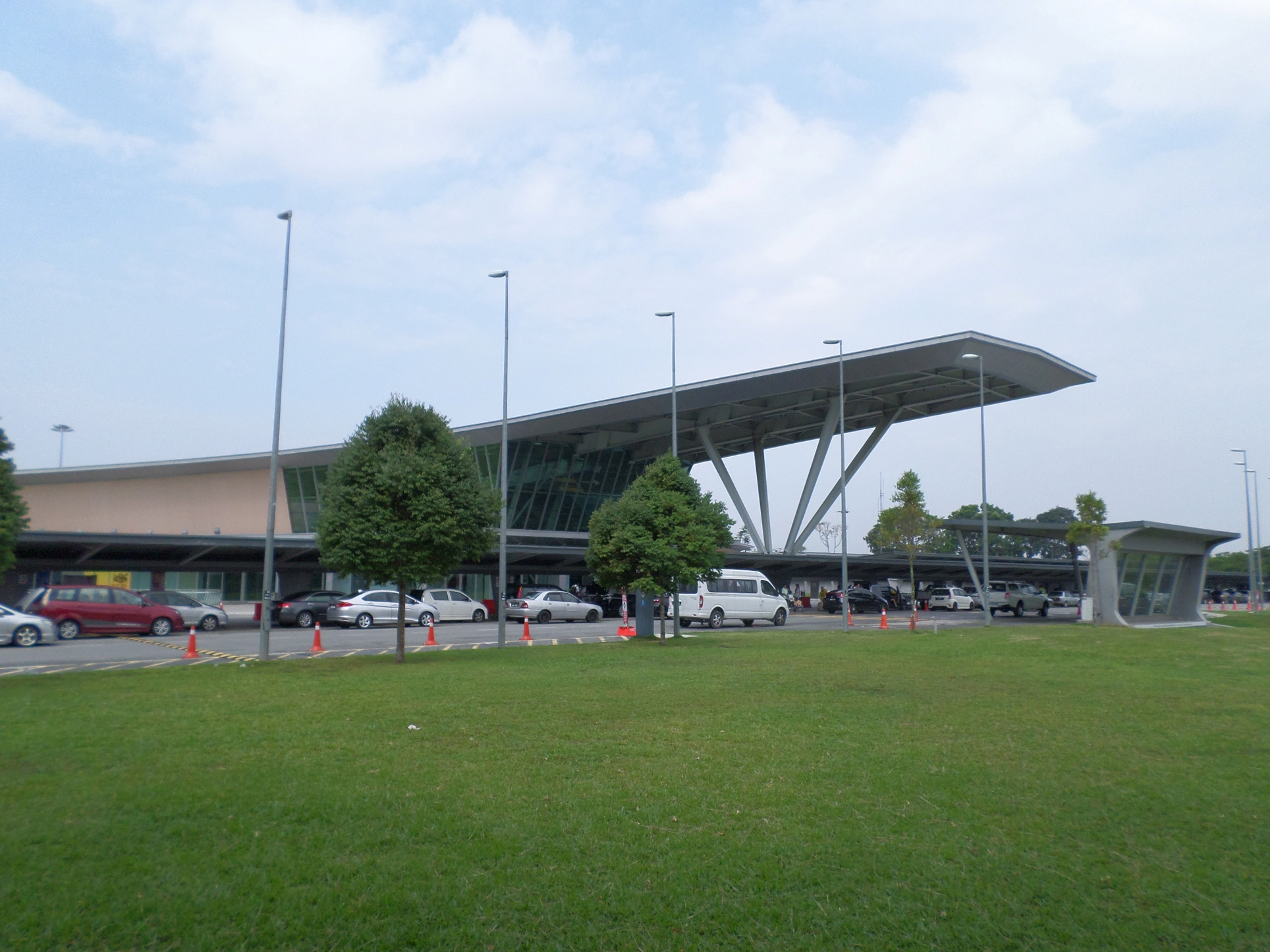
Senai International Airport

The conurbation houses the Senai International Airport which is located in Senai.

== See also ==
- Iskandar Malaysia

Metropolitan areas of Malaysia

- Greater Kuala Lumpur
  - Klang Valley
- Greater Kuching
- Greater Kota Kinabalu
- Greater Penang Conurbation
- Kinta Valley
