= Layang-Layang =

Layang-Layang may refer to:

- Layang-layang, traditional kites of the Indonesian island of Java
- Layang-Layang Airport, an airport in the Spartly islands administered by Malaysia
- Layang-Layang, Johor, a town in Johor, Malaysia
- Layang-Layang railway station, a railway station in Johor, Malaysia
- Layang-Layang (state constituency), a state constituency in Johor, Malaysia
- Swallow Reef, a disputed island in South China Sea
