= KTM Komuter Southern Sector =

Railway service in Malaysia

KTM Komuter Southern Shuttle
- 1 2
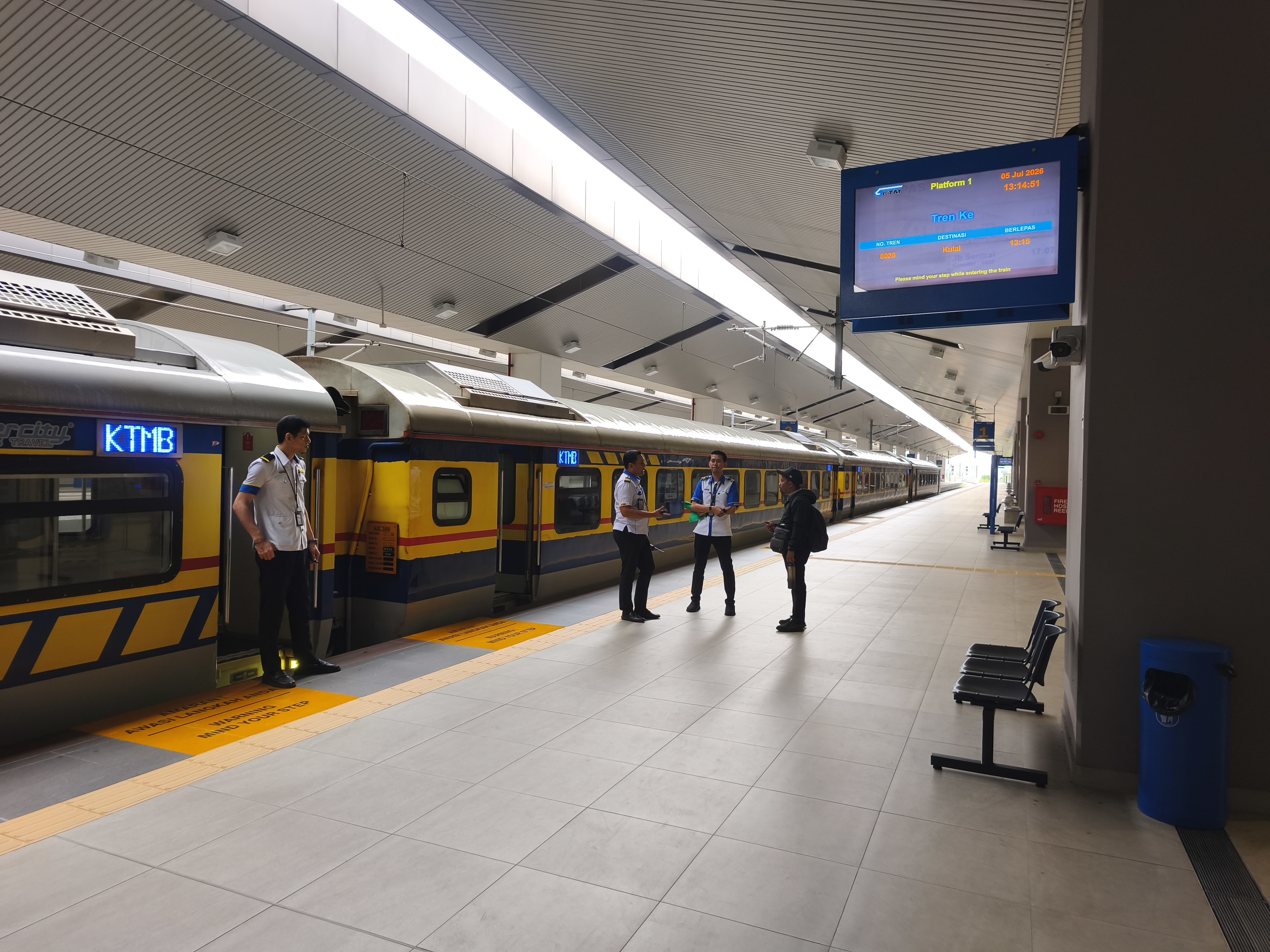
- Shuttle Selatan at Kempas Baru Station

Overview
- Native name: KTM Komuter Shuttle Selatan
- Status: Operational
- Owner: Keretapi Tanah Melayu
- Line number: 1 2
- Locale: Johor Bahru Conurbation
- Termini: Paloh Kempas Baru; Johor Bahru Sentral Pasir Gudang
- Stations: 8 (operational); 3 (proposed)
- Website: www.ktmb.com.my

Service
- Type: Commuter rail
- System: KTM Komuter
- Services: 1 Paloh–JB Sentral Line; 2 Kempas Baru–Pasir Gudang Line
- Operator: Keretapi Tanah Melayu (KTM)

History
- Opened: 16 June 2026; 5 months ago

The KTM Komuter Southern Sector, officially branded as the Southern Shuttle (Malay: Shuttle Selatan), is a commuter rail service operated by Keretapi Tanah Melayu (KTM) in the state of Johor in southern Peninsular Malaysia. The service operates primarily between Paloh and JB Sentral, with a branch to Pasir Gudang. It is the third KTM Komuter network in Peninsular Malaysia after the Central Sector in the Klang Valley and the Northern Sector in the northern states.

The service was officially launched on 16 June 2026 and primarily serves daily commuters within the Johor Bahru Conurbation, specifically the cities of Johor Bahru and Pasir Gudang, as well as the town of Kulai. The service was introduced in anticipation of the launch of the Johor Bahru–Singapore Rapid Transit System.

== History ==
=== Former Seremban–Gemas Shuttle (2015–2016) ===
The Southern Shuttle brand was originally used for an interim shuttle service from Seremban to Gemas following the completion of electrification and double-tracking works on that specific stretch. This initial shuttle operation was terminated on 11 July 2016 when it was fully absorbed into the extended Batu Caves-Pulau Sebang Line.

=== Southern Shuttle reintroduction (2024–present) ===
On 14 March 2024, it was announced that a southern commuter service would be introduced along the Gemas–Johor Bahru corridor after the tracks were electrified and double-tracked. Before this, passenger services on the Gemas–Johor Bahru Sentral (JB Sentral) corridor of the West Coast Line were primarily operated using diesel-hauled trains.

Between October 2023 and May 2024, the Kempas Baru–Pasir Gudang freight line received upgrades, including the replacement of its tracks and signalling system, raising maximum operational speeds from 30 km/h (19 mph) to 80 km/h (50 mph). On 22 July 2025, KTM announced plans to introduce passenger service on the line to serve the higher passenger traffic expected from the upcoming Johor Bahru–Singapore Rapid Transit System (RTS Link). On 11 December 2025, Transport Minister Anthony Loke formally confirmed the launch of commuter services on the Kulai–JB Sentral line to complement the KTM ETS service. Trial runs for the passenger service on the Kempas Baru–Pasir Gudang route began in March 2026.

On 13 June 2026, KTM formally announced that the Southern Shuttle would commence operations on 16 June. The network was officially inaugurated by Transport Minister Anthony Loke alongside Johor Menteri Besar Onn Hafiz Ghazi. On 8 August that same year, the line was extended northwards from Kulai to Paloh, with intermediate stations at Kluang, Rengam, and Layang-Layang.

== Network and operations ==
=== Routes ===
The Southern Shuttle operates along the West Coast Line in southern Peninsular Malaysia, consisting of two routes that intersect at Kempas Baru station:

- 1 Paloh–JB Sentral Line: Spans approximately 110.1 kilometres along the main electrified West Coast Line from Paloh to JB Sentral. At JB Sentral, passengers can connect to the Shuttle Tebrau service to Singapore.
- 2 Kempas Baru–Pasir Gudang Line: Spans 40 kilometres along a single-track, non-electrified branch line connecting the industrial city of Pasir Gudang to the main line network. This marks the first time regular passenger operations have been introduced on this corridor, which was previously exclusive to freight traffic serving Johor Port.

=== Stations ===
Legend
⇄ = cross-platform interchange
⇅ = out-of-station connecting transfer

Station name	1	2	Opening	Interchange station / Notes
Paloh	●		8 August 2026; 3 months ago	Northern terminus ⇄ ETS
Kluang	●		8 August 2026; 3 months ago	⇄ ETS
Rengam	●		8 August 2026; 3 months ago	⇄ ETS
Layang-Layang	●		8 August 2026; 3 months ago	⇄ ETS
Kulai	●		16 June 2026; 5 months ago	⇄ ETS
Kempas Baru	●	●	16 June 2026; 5 months ago	Interchange and central terminus ⇄ ETS
Taman Daya		●	TBA	Proposed stations
Bandar Seri Alam		●	TBA	Proposed stations
Kampung Pasir Putih		●	TBA	Proposed stations
Pasir Gudang		●	16 June 2026; 5 months ago	Eastern terminus
Johor Bahru Sentral (JB Sentral)	●		16 June 2026; 5 months ago	Southern terminus ⇄ ETS ⇅ RTS Bukit Chagar

=== Service pattern ===
The following table summarises the operating pattern of services on the KTM Komuter Southern Sector:

Line	Route	Service frequency	Approximate journey time	Notes
1	Paloh–Kempas Baru–JB Sentral	Regular intervals throughout the day	TBA	Double-track, fully electrified line
2	Kempas Baru–Pasir Gudang	Limited service frequency during initial phase	Approx. 40 minutes	Single-track, non-electrified line; requires interchange at Kempas Baru for through journeys

=== Fares and ticketing ===
The Southern Sector utilizes a distance-based fare system identical to the KTM Komuter Central and Northern sectors. Fares are determined by the number of stations travelled, with ticketing handled via station counters, automated ticket vending machines, and integrated stored-value smart cards.

However, the per-kilometer fare structure introduced for the Southern Sector has drawn public scrutiny for being relatively expensive compared to KTMB's older commuter services in northern and central Peninsular Malaysia. For example, a single-fare trip over a comparable ~30 to 40 minute journey timeframe costs RM4.00 in the Northern Sector (such as between Sungai Petani and Penang Sentral), whereas the base single-fare from Kulai to JB Sentral is set significantly higher at RM10.20. This variance has been attributed to the elevated operating expenses required for the region's localized rolling stock provisions, though the Ministry of Transport has cushioned regular users by distributing dedicated "Kad MADANI Shuttle Selatan" fare subsidies.

==== Fare matrix ====
The following table outlines the standard adult single-journey cash fares (in RM) between stations within the Southern Sector network:

KTM Komuter Southern Sector adult single fares
Stations	JB Sentral	Pasir Gudang	Kempas Baru	Kulai	Layang-Layang	Rengam	Kluang	Paloh
JB Sentral	—N/a	RM15.80	RM8.80	RM10.20	RM11.70	RM12.50	RM13.30	RM15.30
Pasir Gudang	RM15.80	—N/a	RM7.00	RM16.40	RM17.80	RM18.60	RM19.50	RM21.40
Kempas Baru	RM8.80	RM7.00	—N/a	RM9.40	RM10.80	RM11.60	RM12.50	RM14.40
Kulai	RM10.20	RM16.40	RM9.40	—N/a	RM9.40	RM10.20	RM11.10	RM13.00
Layang-Layang	RM11.70	RM17.80	RM10.80	RM9.40	—N/a	RM8.80	RM9.60	RM11.60
Rengam	RM12.50	RM18.60	RM11.60	RM10.20	RM8.80	—N/a	RM8.90	RM10.80
Kluang	RM13.30	RM19.50	RM12.50	RM11.10	RM9.60	RM8.90	—N/a	RM10.00
Paloh	RM15.30	RM21.40	RM14.40	RM13.00	RM11.60	RM10.80	RM10.00	—N/a

== Infrastructure and rolling stock ==
The infrastructure profiles of the two routes differ significantly. The Paloh–JB Sentral line corridor features a fully electrified 25 kV AC overhead catenary system (OCS) and double tracks, while the Kempas Baru–Pasir Gudang branch line remains a single-track, non-electrified layout.

To prevent implementation delays, the service was launched on 16 June 2026 using interim rolling stock configurations drawn from existing KTMB diesel fleets. The Paloh–JB Sentral route utilizes conventional locomotive-hauled passenger coaches adapted for commuter frequency. The non-electrified Pasir Gudang branch utilizes a hybrid formation: a conventional diesel locomotive providing mechanical propulsion for unpowered, repurposed KTM Class 83 Electric Multiple Unit (EMU) carriages, supported by a standalone Power Generating Car (PGC) to operate the on-board air conditioning and automated sliding doors. The service also uses KTM Class 81 units when the KTM Class 83 unit is faulty.

=== Current rolling stock formations ===
Route / Sector	Car No.	Type / Designation	Model / Class	Notes
Paloh–JB Sentral (Locomotive-Hauled)	—	M (Locomotive)	KTM Class 25	Diesel-electric primary mover.
Paloh–JB Sentral (Locomotive-Hauled)	1	ASC (Passenger Coach)	Air-Conditioned Second Class	Inter-city style; 2+2 fixed seating layout.
Paloh–JB Sentral (Locomotive-Hauled)	2	ASC (Passenger Coach)	Air-Conditioned Second Class	Inter-city style; 2+2 fixed seating layout.
Paloh–JB Sentral (Locomotive-Hauled)	3	ASC (Passenger Coach)	Air-Conditioned Second Class	Inter-city style; 2+2 fixed seating layout.
Paloh–JB Sentral (Locomotive-Hauled)	4	ASC (Passenger Coach)	Air-Conditioned Second Class	Inter-city style; 2+2 fixed seating layout.
Paloh–JB Sentral (Locomotive-Hauled)	—	PGC (Power Car)	Power Generating Car	Houses diesel generators for head-end power.
Kempas Baru–Pasir Gudang (Locomotive-EMU Hybrid)	—	M (Locomotive)	KTM Class 24; KTM Class 25	Diesel-electric locomotive for tractive propulsion.
Kempas Baru–Pasir Gudang (Locomotive-EMU Hybrid)	1	Mc (Motor Driving Car)	KTM Class 83; KTM Class 81	Longitudinal commuter seating; traction motors unpowered.
Kempas Baru–Pasir Gudang (Locomotive-EMU Hybrid)	2	T (Trailer Car)	KTM Class 83; KTM Class 81	Longitudinal commuter seating; pantograph isolated.
Kempas Baru–Pasir Gudang (Locomotive-EMU Hybrid)	3	Mc (Motor Driving Car)	KTM Class 83; KTM Class 81	Longitudinal commuter seating; traction motors unpowered.
Kempas Baru–Pasir Gudang (Locomotive-EMU Hybrid)	—	PGC (Power Car)	Power Generating Car	Supplies auxiliary power for climate control and sliding doors.

== Ridership ==
Ridership statistics published by the Ministry of Transport are for all KTM Komuter Southern Sector services. No separate statistics for the individual lines are published. (Note: KTM Komuter Selatan ridership data in the APAD report refers to southern segments of KTM Komuter Central Sector and hence is not counted towards the KTM Komuter Southern Sector's ridership.)

KTM Komuter Southern Sector Ridership
Year	Sector	Ridership	Annual Ridership	Change (%)	Note
2026	Q4		24,987	-	
2026	Q3	23,792	24,987	-	As of September 2026
2026	Q2	1,195	24,987	-	
2026	Q1	-	24,987	-	

== Future development ==
=== Service expansion ===
Along the Kempas Baru–Pasir Gudang Line, three sites were formally proposed in January 2026 for intermediate passenger stations at Taman Daya, Bandar Seri Alam, and Kampung Pasir Putih to serve high-density suburban residential zones.

=== Permanent rolling stock procurement ===
To replace the temporary locomotive-hauled fleets, the Malaysian government approved an allocation exceeding RM200 million for the procurement of 10 brand-new Electric Multiple Unit (EMU) trainsets, scheduled for delivery within two to three years. Because the regional infrastructure profile is divided, the long-term fleet deployment strategies differ completely by sector:

- Electrified sector (Paloh–JB Sentral): Once the 25 kV AC overhead lines stabilise, the route will transition to dedicated 3-car Electric Multiple Units (EMUs) drawn from the newly procured 10-trainset allocation. Shorter trainsets are being prioritised to build a high-frequency, agile timetable aimed at peak intervals of 15 minutes. The superior acceleration profile of native EMUs will make intermediate infill stations (such as Larkin, Saleng, Indahpura, and Senai) operationally viable.
- Non-electrified sector (Kempas Baru–Pasir Gudang): Because the 40-kilometre Pasir Gudang branch line continues to function exclusively as a single-track, non-electrified freight corridor with no active federal plans for electrification or double-tracking, services are slated to run via diesel-propulsion hybrid sets until further notice. To facilitate passenger operations alongside cargo traffic, the sector utilizes an interim hybrid configuration where a conventional KTMB diesel locomotive mechanically hauls unpowered, repurposed KTM commuter carriages, supported by a separate wagon-mounted Power Generating Car (PGC) for onboard electrical auxiliary needs. Long-term service frequency expansions remain bound to localized passenger demand and state-level Phase 2 proposals targeting three minor mid-route passenger halts at Taman Daya, Bandar Seri Alam, and Kampung Pasir Putih.

Line / Route	Traction type	Consist length	Future fleet allocation	Operational target
Paloh–JB Sentral	Pure electric (OCS)	3-car or 4-car EMU	10 new electric EMU Fleet	High-frequency timetabling (15-minute peak target); enables infill stations.
Kempas Baru–Pasir Gudang	Diesel locomotive / Rail cabin hybrid	Locomotive + 3-car EMU coaches	Existing fleet optimization	Operates on diesel hybrid sets until further notice; introduces passenger halts based on localized demand.

== See also ==
- Keretapi Tanah Melayu
  - KTM Intercity & KTM ETS
    - KTM West Coast Line
    - KTM East Coast Line
  - KTM Komuter
    - Batu Caves–Pulau Sebang Line
    - KL Sentral–Terminal Skypark Line
    - Northern Sector
- Railway electrification in Malaysia
- Johor Bahru–Singapore Rapid Transit System
