= Pasir Gudang railway station =

Railway station in Malaysia

Pasir Gudang

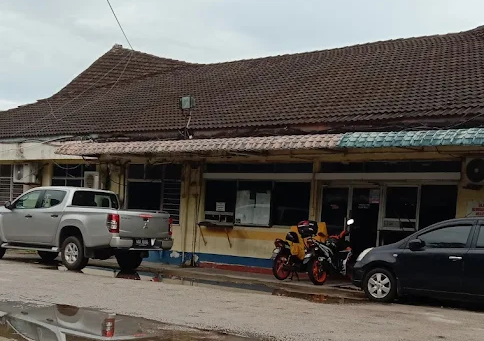

General information
- Other names: Malay: ڤاسير ݢودڠ (Jawi); Chinese: 巴西古当; Tamil: பாசிர் கூடாங்
- Location: Pasir Gudang; Johor; Malaysia
- Coordinates: 1.4481°N 103.9255°E
- Owner: Railway Assets Corporation
- Operator: Keretapi Tanah Melayu
- Line: Pasir Gudang branch line
- Platforms: 1 side platform

Construction
- Parking: Available

Key dates
- 2026: Opened for passenger service

Services
Preceding station	KTM Komuter	Following station
Kempas Baru Terminus	Kempas Baru–Pasir Gudang Line	Terminus
Location

The Pasir Gudang railway station is a Malaysian train station located at and named after the town of Pasir Gudang, in the Johor Bahru District of the state Johor. This station is the terminus for the Kempas Baru-Pasir Gudang line of the KTM Komuter Southern Sector.

== History ==
The station opened as an freight operations station in 1983 as part of the Pasir Gudang branch line intended to serve the Johor Port. Following proposals for a Kempas Bahru-Pasir Gudang commuter train service and trials for the new Shuttle Selatan service, the station was upgraded to a passenger station and commenced passenger services on 16 June 2026. The station is served by two daily trips to and from Kempas Baru station.
