= Rengam railway station =

Railway station in Malaysia

Rengam

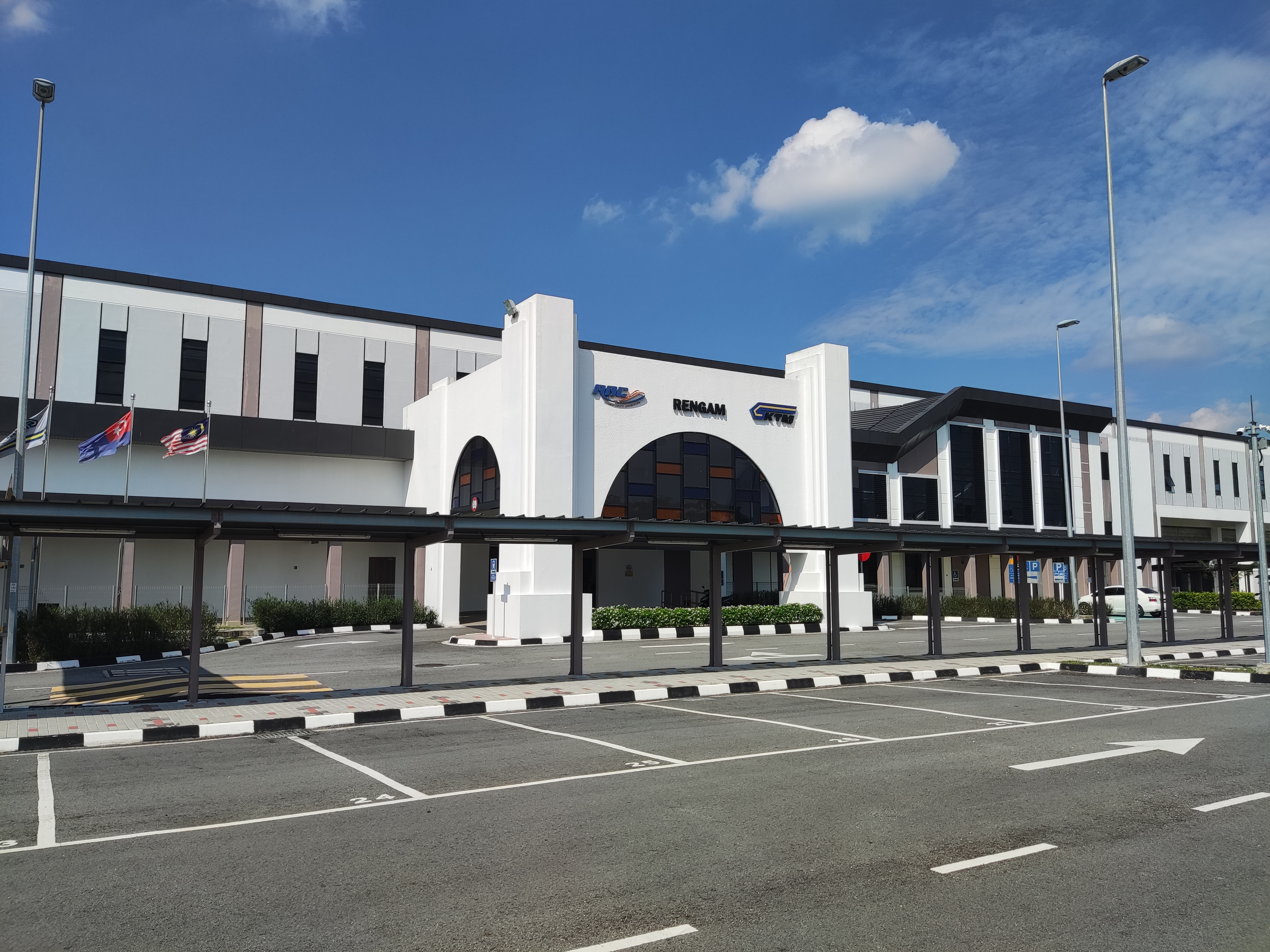

General information
- Other names: Malay: رڠݢم (Jawi); Chinese: 令金; Tamil: ரெங்கம்
- Location: Renggam, Kluang District; Johor; Malaysia
- Coordinates: 1°53′2.6″N 103°24′14.3″E
- Owner: Railway Assets Corporation
- Operator: Keretapi Tanah Melayu
- Line: West Coast Line
- Platforms: 2 side platforms
- Tracks: 2

Construction
- Structure type: Elevated
- Parking: Available
- Accessible: Yes

History
- Opened: 1909
- Rebuilt: 25 January 2025; 20 months ago
- Electrified: 2025

Services
Preceding station	KTM Komuter	Following station
Kluang towards Paloh	Paloh–JB Sentral Line	Layang-Layang towards Johor Bahru Sentral
Preceding station	ETS	Following station
Kluang towards KL Sentral	KL Sentral–JB Sentral (Platinum)	Layang-Layang towards JB Sentral
Kluang towards Padang Besar	Padang Besar–JB Sentral (Gold)	Layang-Layang towards JB Sentral
Location

The Rengam railway station is a Malaysian train station located at and named after the town of Renggam in the Kluang District of the state of Johor, Malaysia.

Similar to Kluang, passenger operations shifted to the Rengam Temporary Railway Station which is constructed on a viaduct some miles away from future Rengam Station to facilitate the Gemas-Johor Bahru electrification and double-tracking project (EDTP). This left the old Rengam Station open only for passenger facilities. It is still unknown whether the tracks within old Rengam Station have been removed.

Since 12 December 2025, Rengam station has been served by several KTM ETS services to Padang Besar, KL Sentral and JB Sentral, replaced the former KTM Intercity Ekspres Selatan service which was terminated on 1 January 2026.

== See also ==
- Rail transport in Malaysia
