= Kulai railway station =

Railway station in Kulai, Malaysia

Kulai

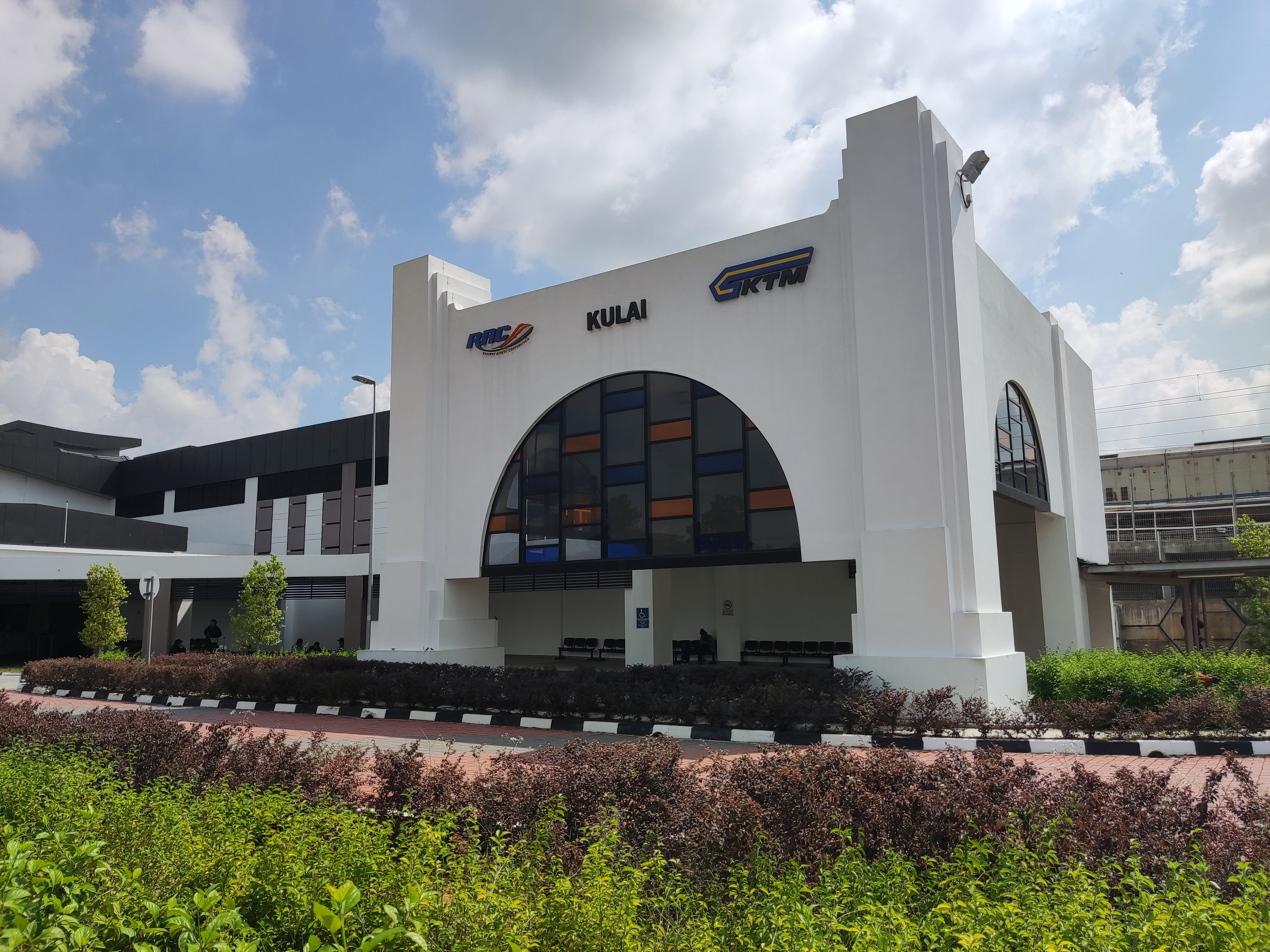

General information
- Other names: Malay: کولاي (Jawi); Chinese: 古来; Tamil: கூலாய்
- Location: Kulai; Johor; Malaysia
- Coordinates: 1°39′51.5″N 103°35′52.8″E
- Owner: Railway Assets Corporation
- Operator: Keretapi Tanah Melayu
- Line: West Coast Line
- Platforms: 2 side platforms and 2 island platforms
- Tracks: 4
- Connections: Kulai Bus Terminal

Construction
- Structure type: At-grade
- Parking: Available, free
- Accessible: Yes

History
- Opened: 1909; 117 years ago
- Rebuilt: 12 March 2025; 18 months ago
- Electrified: 2025

Services
Preceding station	KTM Komuter	Following station
Layang-Layang towards Paloh	Paloh–JB Sentral Line	Kempas Baru towards Johor Bahru Sentral
Preceding station	ETS	Following station
Layang-Layang towards KL Sentral	KL Sentral–JB Sentral (Platinum)	Kempas Baru towards JB Sentral
Kluang towards Padang Besar	Padang Besar–JB Sentral (Platinum)	Kempas Baru towards JB Sentral
Kluang towards Butterworth	Butterworth–JB Sentral (Platinum)	Kempas Baru towards JB Sentral
Layang-Layang towards Padang Besar	Padang Besar–JB Sentral (Gold)	Kempas Baru towards JB Sentral
Preceding station	Keretapi Tanah Melayu (Intercity)	Following station
Kluang towards Tumpat	Ekspres Rakyat Timuran	Kempas Baru towards Johor Bahru Sentral
Location

Kulai railway station is a train station located in the town of Kulai, Johor, Malaysia. The station is located in heart of Kulai town, and is accessible to every location in town within walking distance.

The station is within walking distance of the Kulai Bus Terminal. The station provides KTM Intercity train services, as well as KTM ETS and KTM Komuter services since 12 December 2025 and 16 June 2026 respectively.

On 2 September 2021, train services were moved to a temporary station for the Gemas–Johor Bahru electrification and double-tracking project (EDTP). The station reopened on 12 March 2025.

== See also ==
- Rail transport in Malaysia
- Kulai (town)
