= Layang-Layang railway station =

Railway station in Malaysia

Layang-Layang

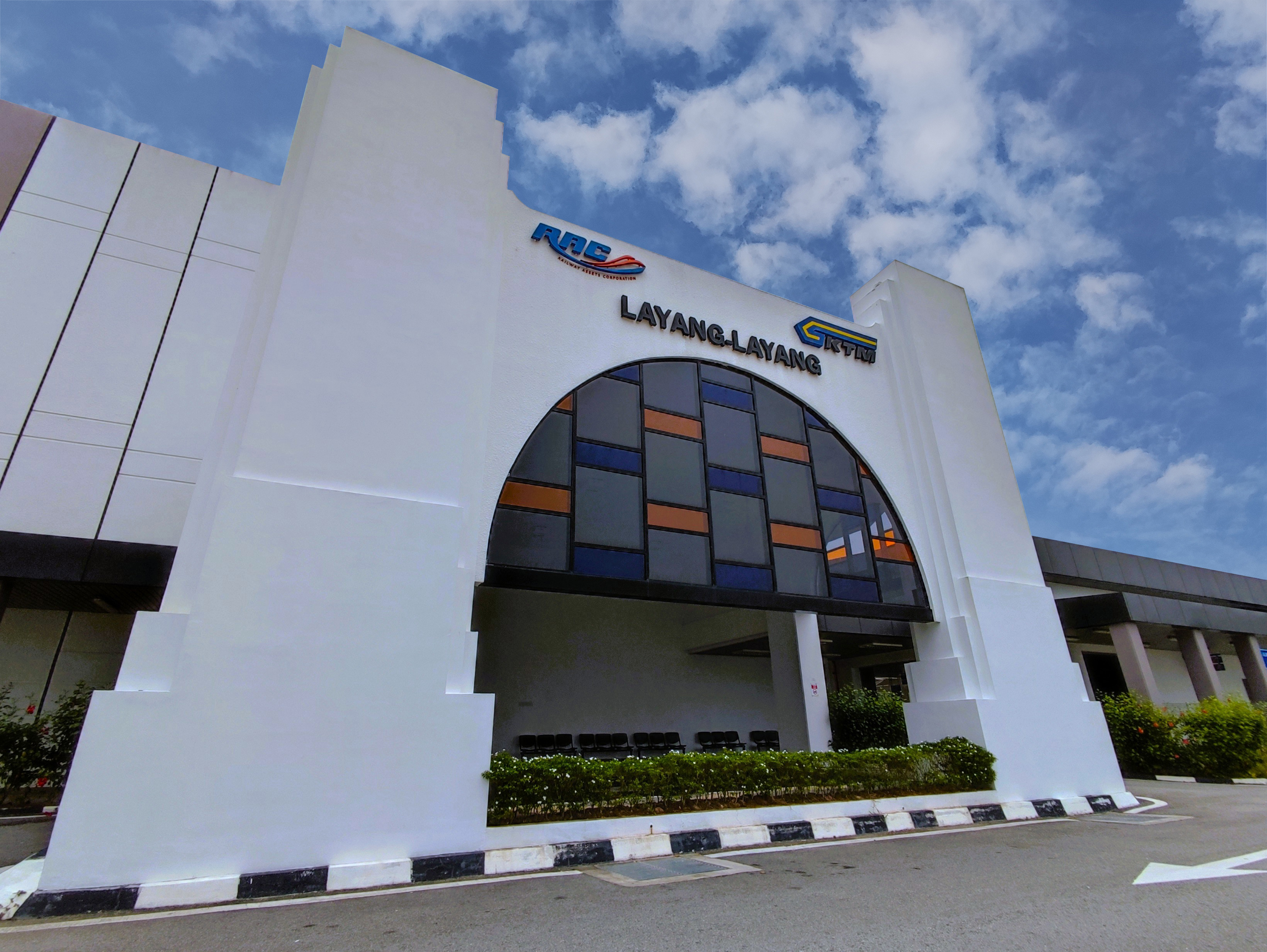

General information
- Other names: Malay: لايڠ لايڠ (Jawi); Chinese: 拉央拉央; Tamil: லாயாங் லாயாங்
- Location: Layang-Layang, Kluang District; Johor; Malaysia
- Coordinates: 1.812591°N 103.476779°E
- Owner: Keretapi Tanah Melayu
- Line: West Coast Line
- Platforms: 2 side platforms and 2 island platforms
- Tracks: 4

Construction
- Structure type: At-grade
- Parking: Available, free
- Accessible: Yes

History
- Opened: 1909
- Rebuilt: 21 January 2025; 20 months ago
- Electrified: 2025

Services
| Preceding station | KTM Komuter | Following station |
|---|---|---|
| Rengam towards Paloh | Paloh–JB Sentral Line | Kulai towards Johor Bahru Sentral |
| Preceding station | ETS | Following station |
| Rengam towards KL Sentral | KL Sentral–JB Sentral (Platinum) | Kulai towards JB Sentral |
| Rengam towards Padang Besar | Padang Besar–JB Sentral (Gold) | Kulai towards JB Sentral |
Location

The Layang-Layang railway station is a Malaysian train station located at Layang-Layang in the Kluang District of the state Johor, Malaysia.

As part of the Gemas-Johor Bahru electrification and double-tracking project (EDTP), the station was closed on 8 March 2022 and operations were moved to a temporary station at Kampung Kenangan. The new station was completed in 2025. Since 12 December 2025, Layang-Layang station has been served by several KTM ETS services to Padang Besar, KL Sentral and JB Sentral, replaced the former KTM Intercity Ekspres Selatan service which was terminated on 1 January 2026.

== See also ==
- Rail transport in Malaysia
