= Tanjung Langsat Port =

Port in Johor Bahru, Johor, Malaysia

Coordinates: 1°26′36″N 104°00′20″E

Tanjung Langsat Port Pelabuhan Tanjung Langsat
- Interactive map of Tanjung Langsat Port; Pelabuhan Tanjung Langsat

Location
- Location: Pasir Gudang, Johor Bahru, Johor, Malaysia

Details
- Opened: 2003
- Owned by: Johor Corporation
- No. of wharfs: 2

Statistics
- Annual cargo tonnage: 12 million

Tanjung Langsat Port (TLP; Malay: Pelabuhan Tanjung Langsat) is a port in Pasir Gudang, Johor Bahru District, Johor, Malaysia. Wholly owned by Johor Corporation, the port handles bulk cargo such as liquefied petroleum gas (LPG) and dangerous chemicals.

== History ==
Initiated in 1995 and commencing partial operation in 2003, it is the third port in the state after Port of Tanjung Pelepas and Johor Port.

== Architecture ==
The port is situated 12 nautical miles (22 km) from the international shipping lane. It has 3.09 km^{2} (763 acres) of land within the port area and a 4.5 km shoreline facing the Straits of Johor. The port has 5 jetties and 2 cargo wharfs.

== Facilities and services ==
When completed in 2012, Tanjung Langsat Port facilities will include:

- L-shaped twin-berth jetty capable of handling medium-range tankers of up to 30,000 tonnes deadweight (DWT);
- Marine support base;
- Deep sea fishing terminal/multi-purpose wharves;
- Liquid cargo terminal.

The main activities of the port are:

- Petrochemicals and liquid bulk handling;
- Marine support base;
- Deep-sea fishing and multipurpose/barter trade terminal;
- Processing and storage of petroleum based and liquid bulk cargo;
- International cruise center.

Petrochemical industries will account for 60% of the activities at the complex, with gas production, steel-making, and marine and marine-related industries making up the remaining 40%. Several chemical companies operating in the Pasir Gudang industrial area have opened new manufacturing facilities at TLP due to space constraints in Pasir Gudang.

TLP is targeting petroleum-based liquid bulk cargo from the industrial area around Pasir Gudang as well as the adjacent "Tanjung Langsat Industrial Estate" developed for petrochemical facilities. The 18.87 square kilometre industrial estate was developed by Johor Corporation, especially for heavy industries, including petroleum and gas. Johor Corporation, the investment arm of the Johor state government, holds 95% equity interest in the company, while the remaining 5% is held by its wholly owned subsidiary, TPM Technopark Sdn. Bhd.
