= Kempas Baru railway station =

Railway station in Malaysia

Kempas Baru

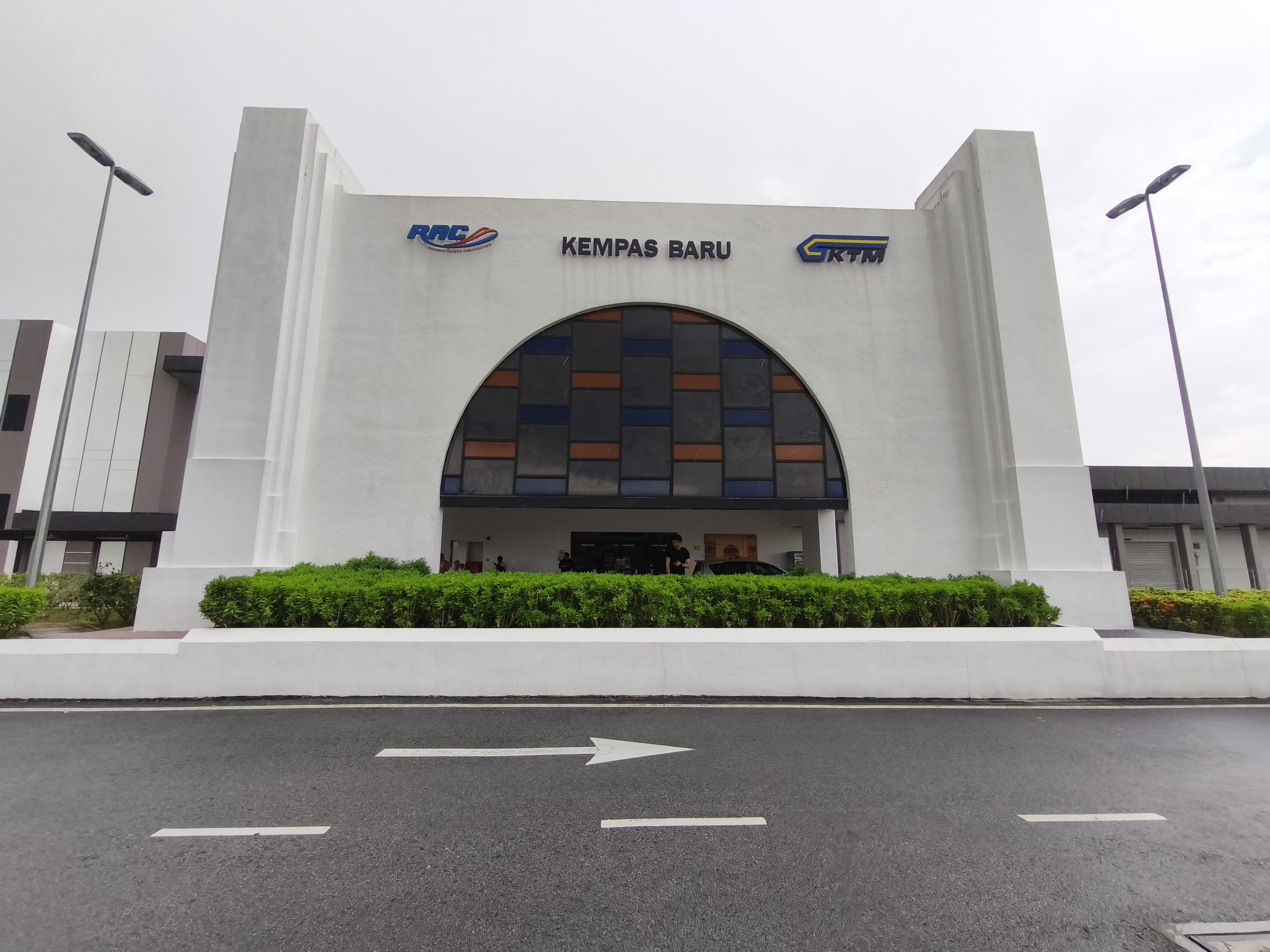

General information
- Other names: Malay: کمڤس بارو (Jawi); Chinese: 甘拔士峇鲁; Tamil: கெம்பாஸ் பாரு
- Location: Kempas, Johor Bahru District, Johor, Malaysia
- Coordinates: 1°32′07.3″N 103°43′23.8″E
- Owner: Railway Assets Corporation
- Operator: Keretapi Tanah Melayu
- Line: West Coast Line
- Platforms: 2 side platforms and 2 island platforms
- Tracks: 4

Construction
- Parking: Available

History
- Rebuilt: 6 February 2024
- Electrified: 12 December 2025
- Former names: Kempas Bahru

Services
Preceding station	KTM Komuter	Following station
Kulai towards Paloh	Paloh–JB Sentral Line	Johor Bahru Sentral Terminus
Terminus	Kempas Baru–Pasir Gudang Line	Pasir Gudang Terminus
Preceding station	ETS	Following station
Kulai towards KL Sentral	KL Sentral–JB Sentral (Platinum)	Johor Bahru Sentral towards JB Sentral
Kulai towards Padang Besar	Padang Besar–JB Sentral (Platinum)	Johor Bahru Sentral towards JB Sentral
Kulai towards Butterworth	Butterworth–JB Sentral (Platinum)	Johor Bahru Sentral towards JB Sentral
Kulai towards Padang Besar	Padang Besar–JB Sentral (Gold)	Johor Bahru Sentral towards JB Sentral
Preceding station	Keretapi Tanah Melayu (Intercity)	Following station
Kulai towards Tumpat	Ekspres Rakyat Timuran	Johor Bahru Sentral Terminus
Location

The Kempas Baru railway station (formerly Kempas Bahru railway station) is a Malaysian train station located in the Kempas district of Johor Bahru, Johor.

== History ==
The station's history dates back to the Federated Malay States Railway (FMSR). In February 2024, the station was relocated to a new facility as part of the Gemas–Johor Bahru Electrified Double Track Project (EDTP). Since 12 December 2025, the station has been integrated into the electrified rail network, serving both ETS and commuter services.

== Modernization and strategic role ==
Following its 2024 relocation, the station was reconfigured into a four-track, multi-platform facility designed to support high-density traffic in the Southern Corridor.

=== Operational significance ===
As of June 2026, Kempas Baru station functions as a critical railway interchange, operating on a hub-and-spoke model. It serves as the primary pivot point between the main Southern Corridor trunk line and the Pasir Gudang feeder branch. Due to track configuration constraints, the station acts as the mandatory transfer hub for passengers commuting from the Pasir Gudang line toward the JB Sentral and Kulai corridors.

The station serves as a pivotal interchange for the newly launched KTM Komuter Southern Sector service, which officially began operations on 16 June 2026, connecting the Kulai–JB Sentral route with the Kempas Baru–Pasir Gudang feeder line.

Due to the temporary suspension of train services at JB Sentral station on 11 June 2026 to facilitate construction works for the RTS Link, Kempas Baru station has been designated as the primary transit hub for affected passengers, with KTMB providing intermediary bus services to connect to Johor Bahru city centre.

=== Infrastructure layout ===
- Track and Platform Layout: The station features two side platforms and two island platforms, serving four tracks.
- Electrification: The facility utilizes 25 kV AC overhead catenary systems, supporting the modernized EMU fleet operational in the region.
