= KTM Class 81 =

Malaysian electric multiple unit train

Class 81
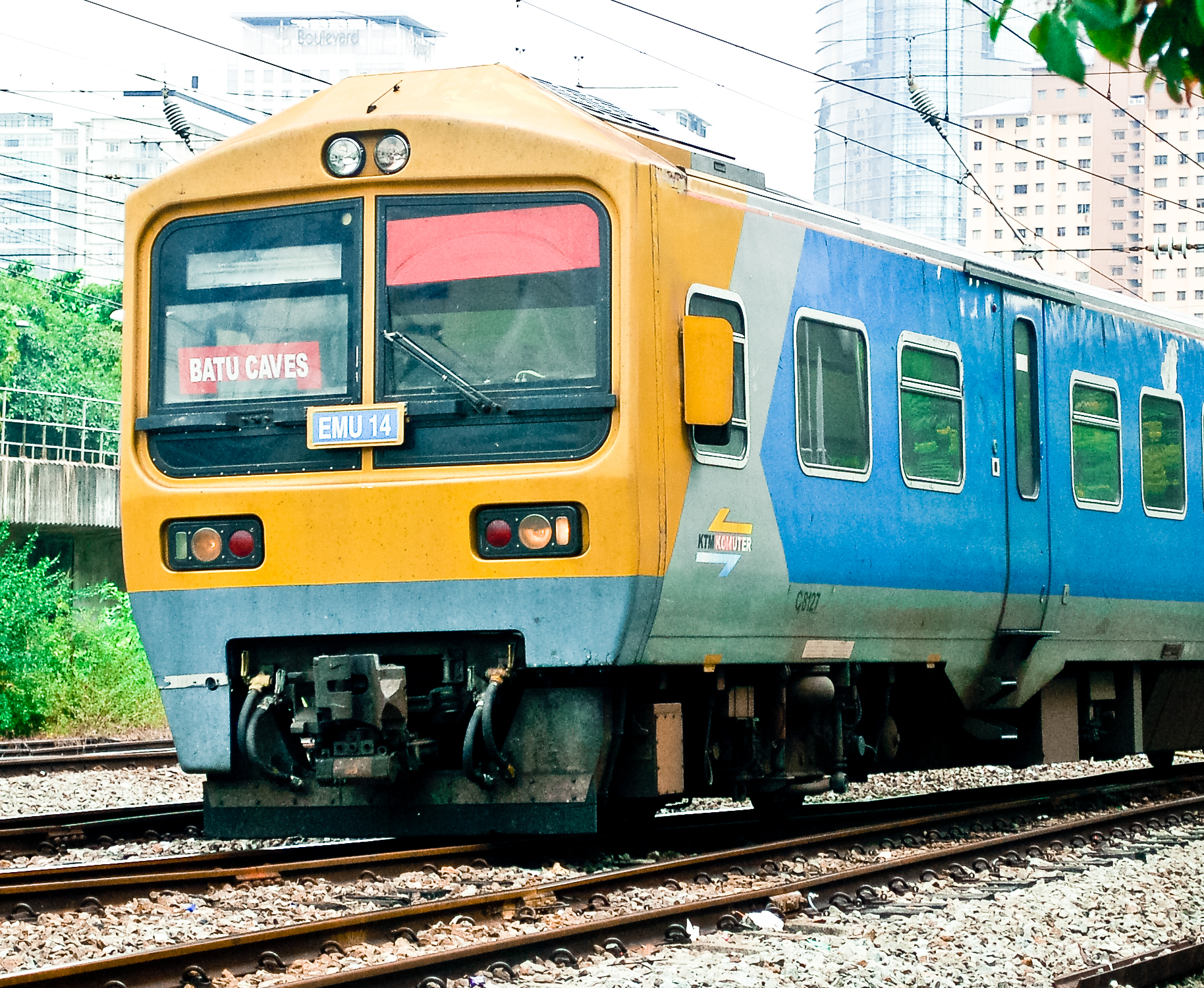
- A Class 81 EMU 14 Komuter train at Persimpangan Bangsar
- Stock type: Electrical Multiple Unit (EMU)
- In service: 1995–2012, 2018–present
- Manufacturer: Ganz-Hunslet
- Designer: Hunslet Transportation Projects
- Built at: Ganz Works (Jenbacher Transport)
- Refurbished: 2018 by Woojin Industrial Systems
- Number built: 18
- Formation: 3 cars per unit
- Capacity: 414 (224 seats)
- Operator: Keretapi Tanah Melayu
- Depots: Batu Gajah Rail Depot; Sentul Komuter Depot
- Lines served: Sentul-Batu Caves Shuttle; Batu Caves-Pulau Sebang/Tampin Line; Padang Besar-Butterworth Line; Kempas Baru-Pasir Gudang Line

Specifications
- Height: 3.65 m (12 ft 0 in)
- Maximum speed: 160 km/h (99 mph) (design); 125 km/h (78 mph) (service)
- Weight: 121 t (119 long tons; 133 short tons)
- Traction system: HOLEC HPD GTO–VVVF (original); Woojin IGBT–VVVF (refurbished)
- Traction motors: 8 × HOLEC DMKT55/18.5 161 kW (216 hp) 3-phase AC induction motor
- Power output: 1,288 kW (1,727 hp)
- Electric system: 25 kV 50 Hz AC overhead catenary
- Current collection: Pantograph
- UIC classification: Bo′Bo′+2′2′+Bo′Bo′
- Track gauge: 1,000 mm (3 ft 3 3/8 in) metre gauge

The Class 81 is the first and oldest type of electric multiple unit introduced by Keretapi Tanah Melayu for its KTM Komuter service. 18 sets were designed by Hunslet Transportation Projects and built by Ganz Works in 1993-1994.

The Class 81 currently operates in a fixed 3-car formation for its regular service. The middle coach is exclusively for women and children.

The KTM Class 81 design is derived from the British Rail Class 323, with the main alteration being that it has single leaf swing-plug doors instead of a double leaf type.

== Description ==
Having been ordered in 1991, the EMUs were built from 1993 to 1994 and entered service on 3 August 1995. The EMUs were the first electric trains of any kind in KTM's history. They operate in multiple-unit formation. The EMUs were state-of-the-art, with remote-controlled pneumatic doors, automatic train protection (ATP), a train data recorder, wheel-slip control, GTO/IGBT traction electronics, and regenerative braking, and ran from a 25 kV 50 Hz AC overhead catenary supply. Up to the point of their introduction, no other KTM motive power used these modern train control systems.

The trains run in a 3-car formation. They were once run in 3+3 formations during rush hour, but this configuration was discontinued.

The cessation of Jenbacher’s rail operations resulted in the loss of spare parts for these trains. Over the years, their maintenance lapsed, resulting in poor reliability and premature failure. As a result, some had to be used as dummy coaches in a hybrid service. A diesel locomotive pulled the coaches, and a power generator was attached at the end. The hybrid service started in 2009 and ended in 2012, when new trains rendered this stopgap measure unnecessary.

Many trains were rendered surplus after the introduction of the Class 92 in 2012. Some were brought down to be converted to intercity sets, while others were scrapped. The refurbished sets could not be used as intercity sets in the end as regulations mandate that long distance trains have a toilet, which this class lacks.

The class disappeared from passenger service from 2012 to 2018. However, in 2018, many of the refurbished EMUs were brought back into service. They currently operate on the Batu Caves shuttle, the Northern Sector, the Southern Sector and occasionally the Central Sector.

Car No.	1	2	3
Seating capacity	72	80	72
Designation	Mc	Tp	Mc

Set Designation	1	2	3	Status
EMU 01	C8101	T8101	C8102	Scrapped
EMU 02	C8103	T8102	C8104	Abandoned
EMU 03	C8105	T8103	C8106	Abandoned
EMU 04	C8107	T8104	C8108	Abandoned
EMU 05	C8109	T8105	C8110	Refurbished
EMU 06	C8111	T8106	C8112	Refurbished
EMU 07	C8113	T8107	C8114	Abandoned
EMU 08	C8115	T8108	C8116	Abandoned
EMU 09	C8117	T8109	C8118	Refurbished, used on Southern Sector
EMU 10	C8119	T8110	C8120	Abandoned
EMU 11	C8121	T8111	C8122	Abandoned
EMU 12	C8123	T8112	C8124	Abandoned
EMU 13	C8125	T8113	C8126	Refurbished
EMU 14	C8127	T8114	C8128	Refurbished
EMU 15	C8129	T8115	C8130	Abandoned
EMU 16	C8131	T8116	C8132	Abandoned at Rawang
EMU 17	C8133	T8117	C8134	Abandoned at Rawang
EMU 18	C8135	T8118	C8136	Abandoned

== Gallery ==
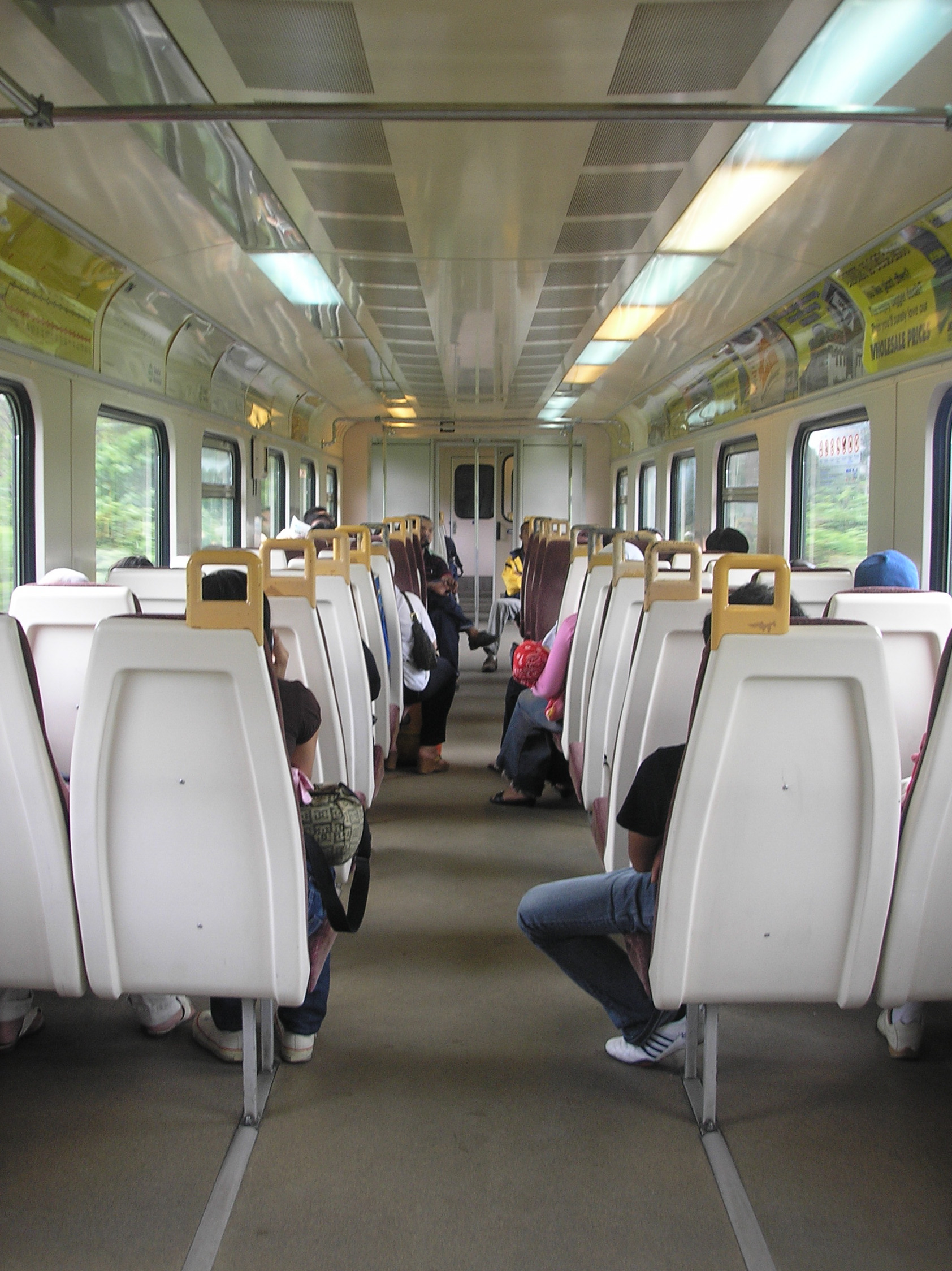
The (modified—with walls cut open and additional handle bars) interior of a Class 81 EMU train

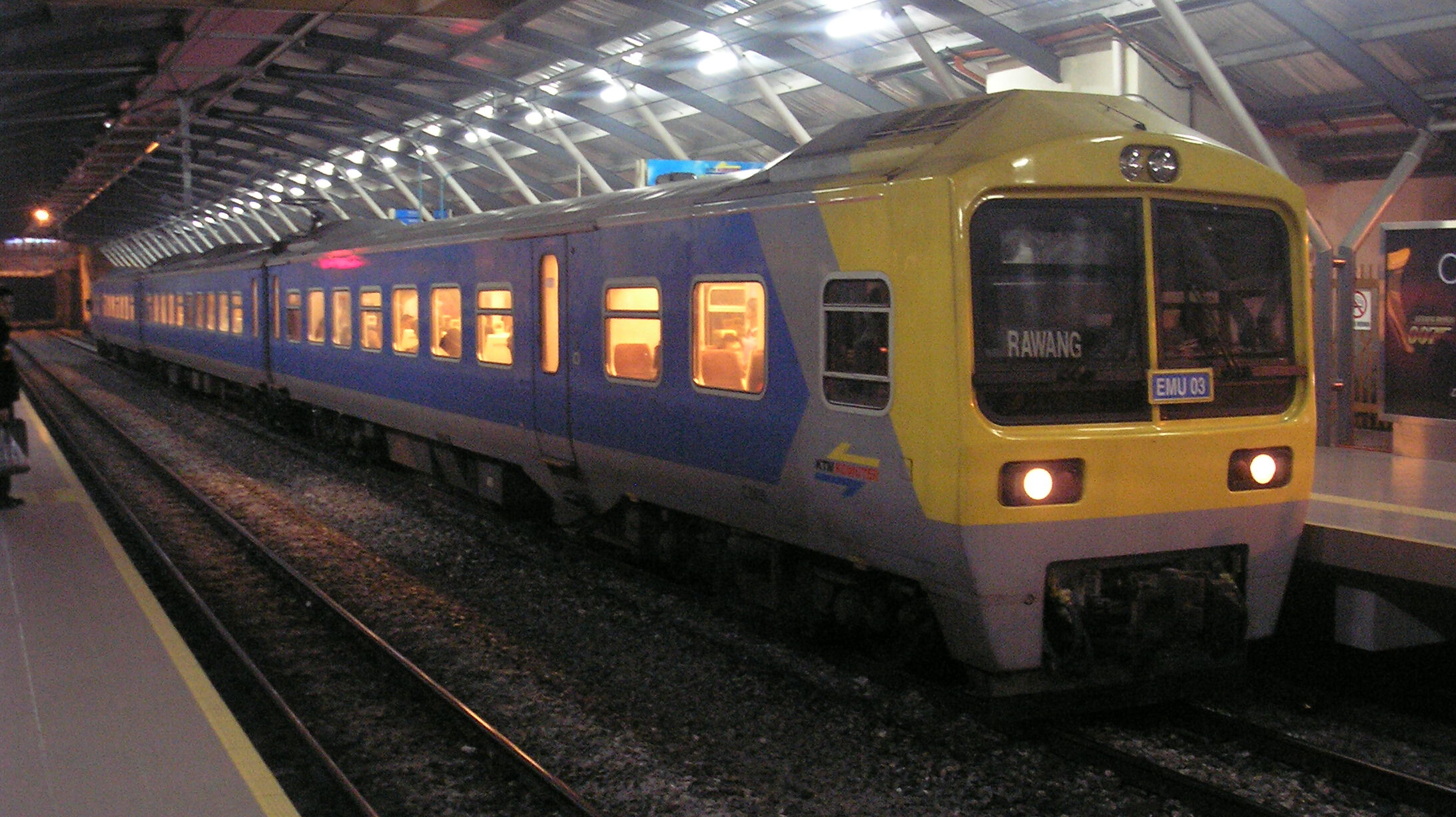
A Class 81 EMU 03 commuter train

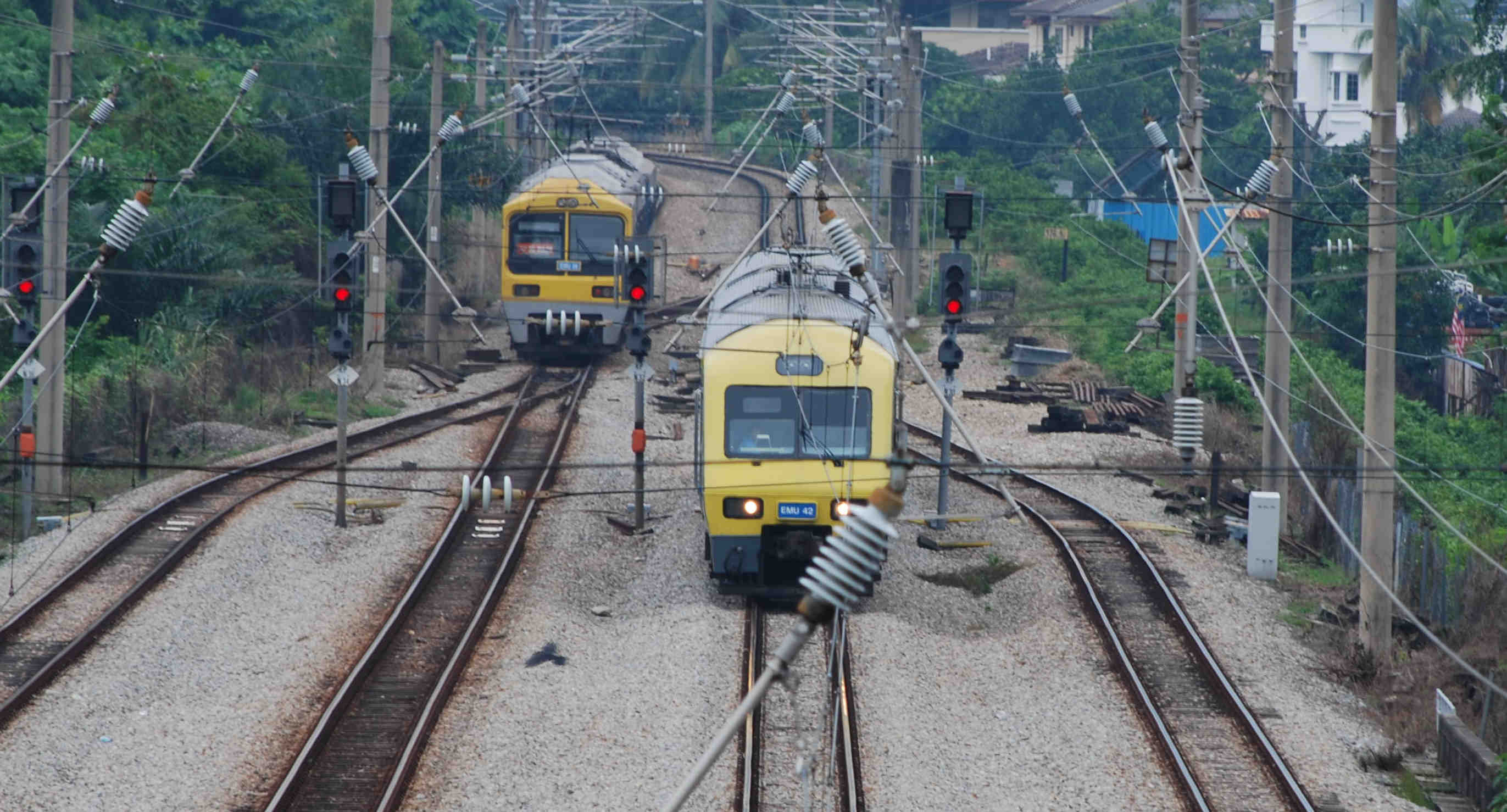
Class 81 EMU 14 (left)

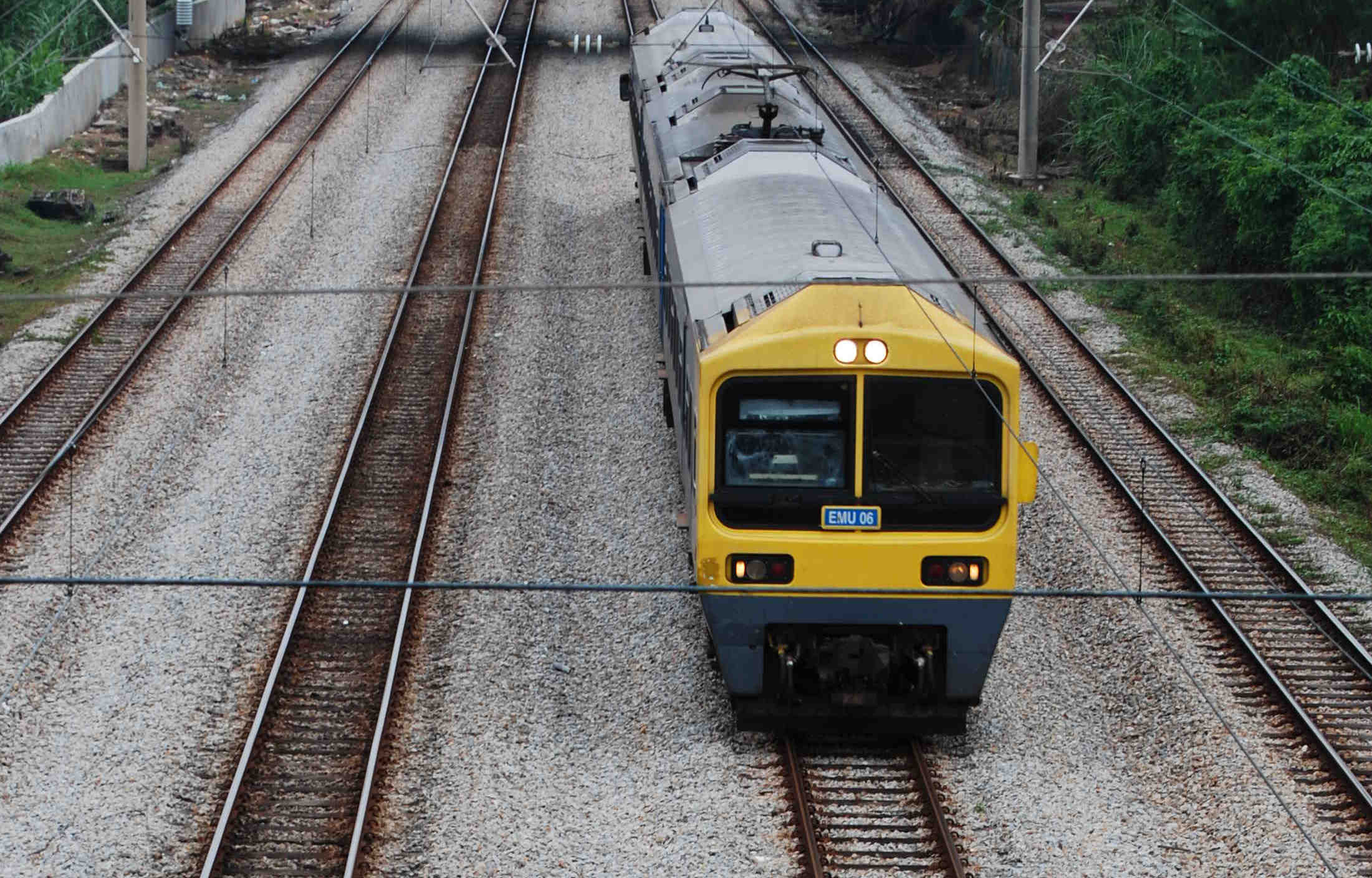
Class 81 EMU 06

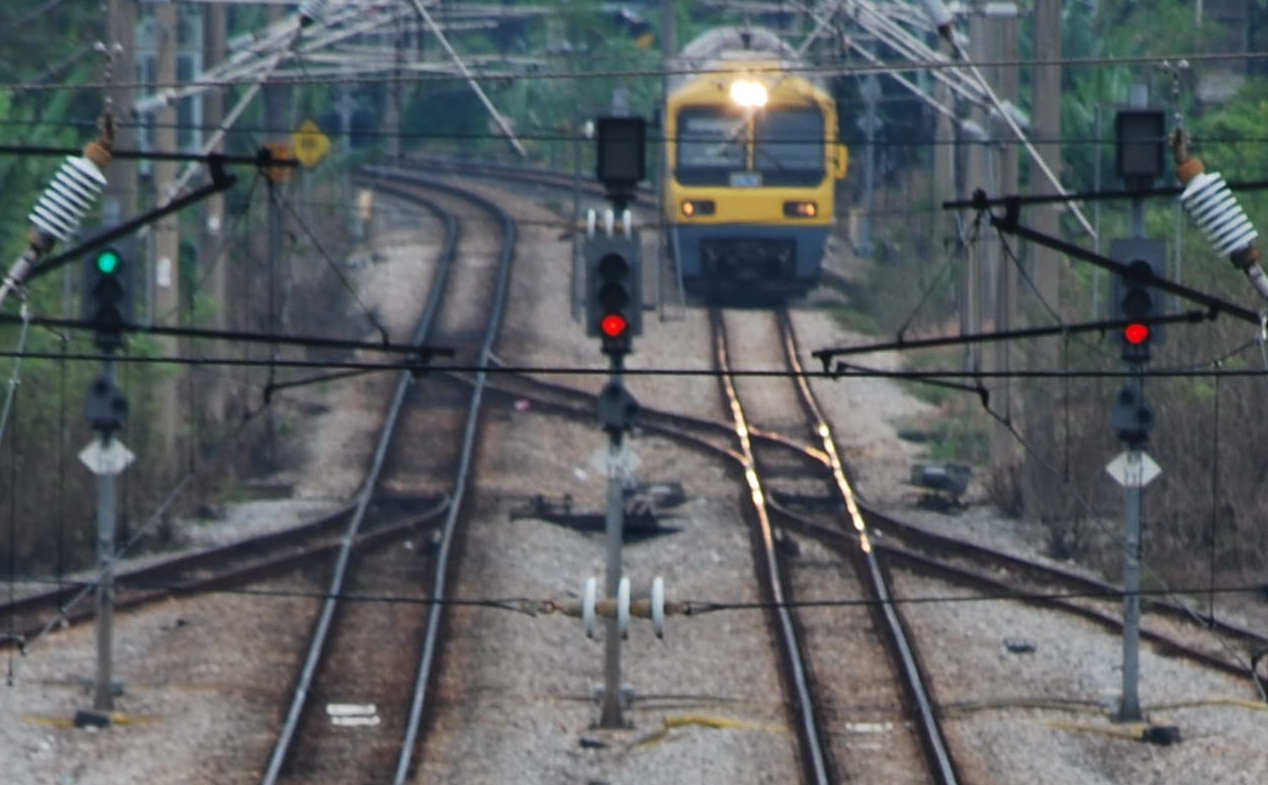
Class 81 EMU 06

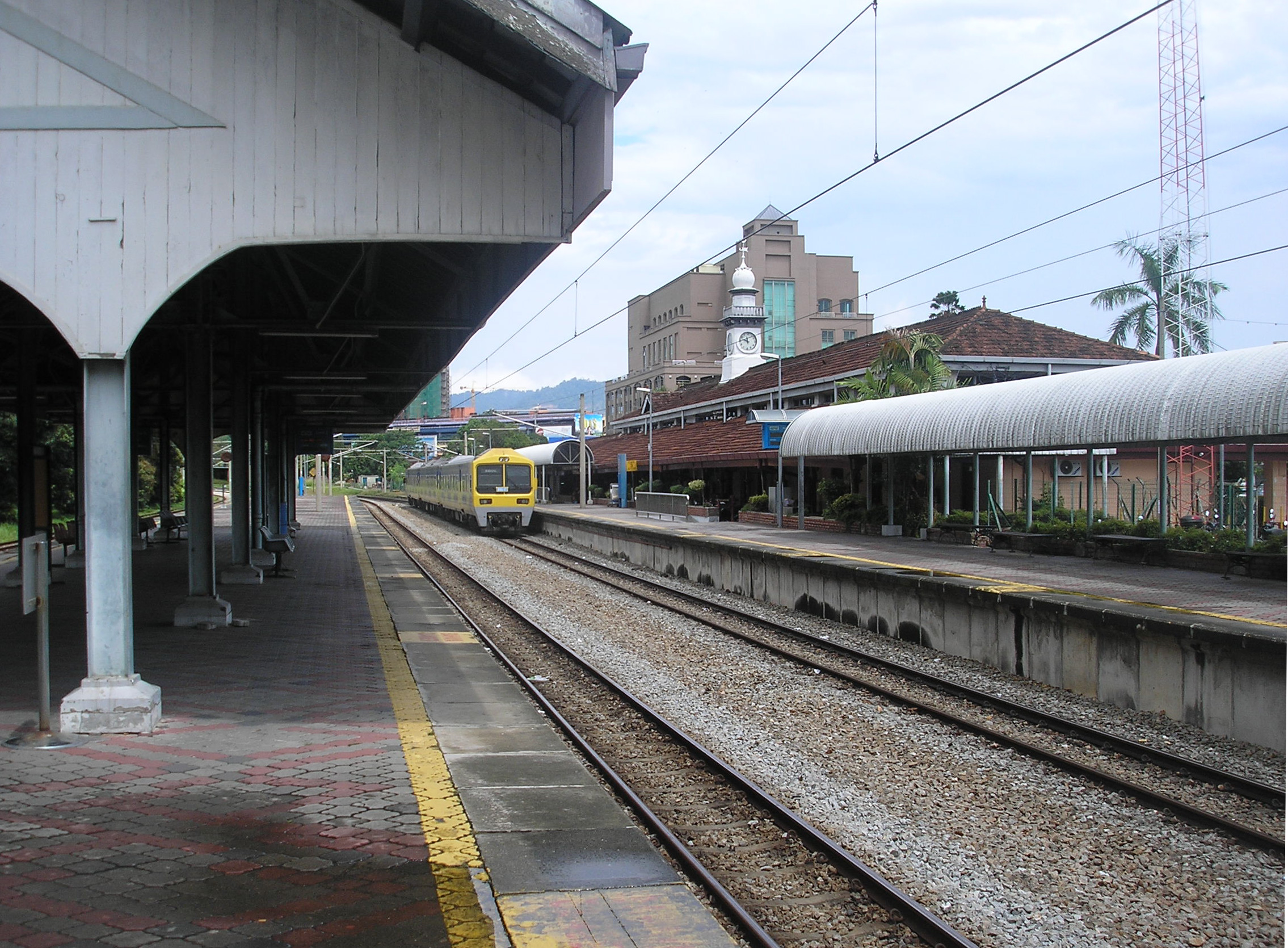
Class 81 EMU at Seremban railway station
