= Greater Kuching =

Local authorities comprising Greater Kuching with a total metropolitan area of 2030.94 square kilometres: Kuching North City Hall (DBKU) Kuching South City Council (MBKS) Padawan Municipal Council (MPP) Kota Samarahan Municipal Council (MPKS)

Greater Kuching refers to the urbanised areas surrounding the metropolitan city of Kuching in Malaysia. Kuching is the capital of the state of Sarawak and is the largest city in the state. The area comprising a total area of 2030.94 square kilometres.

Greater Kuching was fully inspired from Greater Kuala Lumpur, but only in Sarawak. The economic centre and focus point of Kuching is a small area by the coast known as the Kuching Central Business District (also known as Kuching CBD) or Kuching City Centre.

In June 2022, Premier of Sarawak, Abang Abdul Rahman Johari Abang Openg announced the plan to set up the Greater Kuching Coordinated Development Agency (GKCDA) to coordinate all development projects in the area, including Kuching, Samarahan, Serian, and the upcoming two new district area (Bau and Balai Ringin).

== Greater Kuching administrative area ==
Basically there are four (4) major local authorities that fully managed to improvising, stabilize, and modernizing Greater Kuching:

- Dewan Bandaraya Kuching Utara (DBKU)
- Majlis Bandaraya Kuching Selatan (MBKS)
- Majlis Perbandaran Padawan (MPP)
- Majlis Perbandaran Kota Samarahan (MPKS)

Not only that, there is also another thirteen (13) new additional sub areas which is also as the parts of Greater Kuching Coordinated Development Agency (GKCDA). This including:

- Asajaya (Tambirat, Semera, Sadong Jaya, and Terasi)
- Padawan (Kota Padawan, Landeh, Semenggok, Punau, and Semadang)
- Batu Kawah
- Siburan (Bandar Siburan, Beratok, Tapah, and Tarat)
- Serian (Bandar Serian, Batang Sadong, Gedong, and Tebakang)
- Bau (Bandar Bau, Opar, Sibuluh, Jugan, and Stenggang)
- Lundu
- Tanjung Embang
- Sebuyau & Triso
- Balai Ringin
- Simunjan
- Pantu
- Lachau

== See also ==
Metropolitan areas of Malaysia

- Greater Kuala Lumpur
  - Klang Valley
- Greater Kota Kinabalu
- George Town Conurbation
- Johor Bahru Conurbation
- Kinta Valley
