= Kluang railway station =

Railway station in Kluang, Malaysia

Kluang

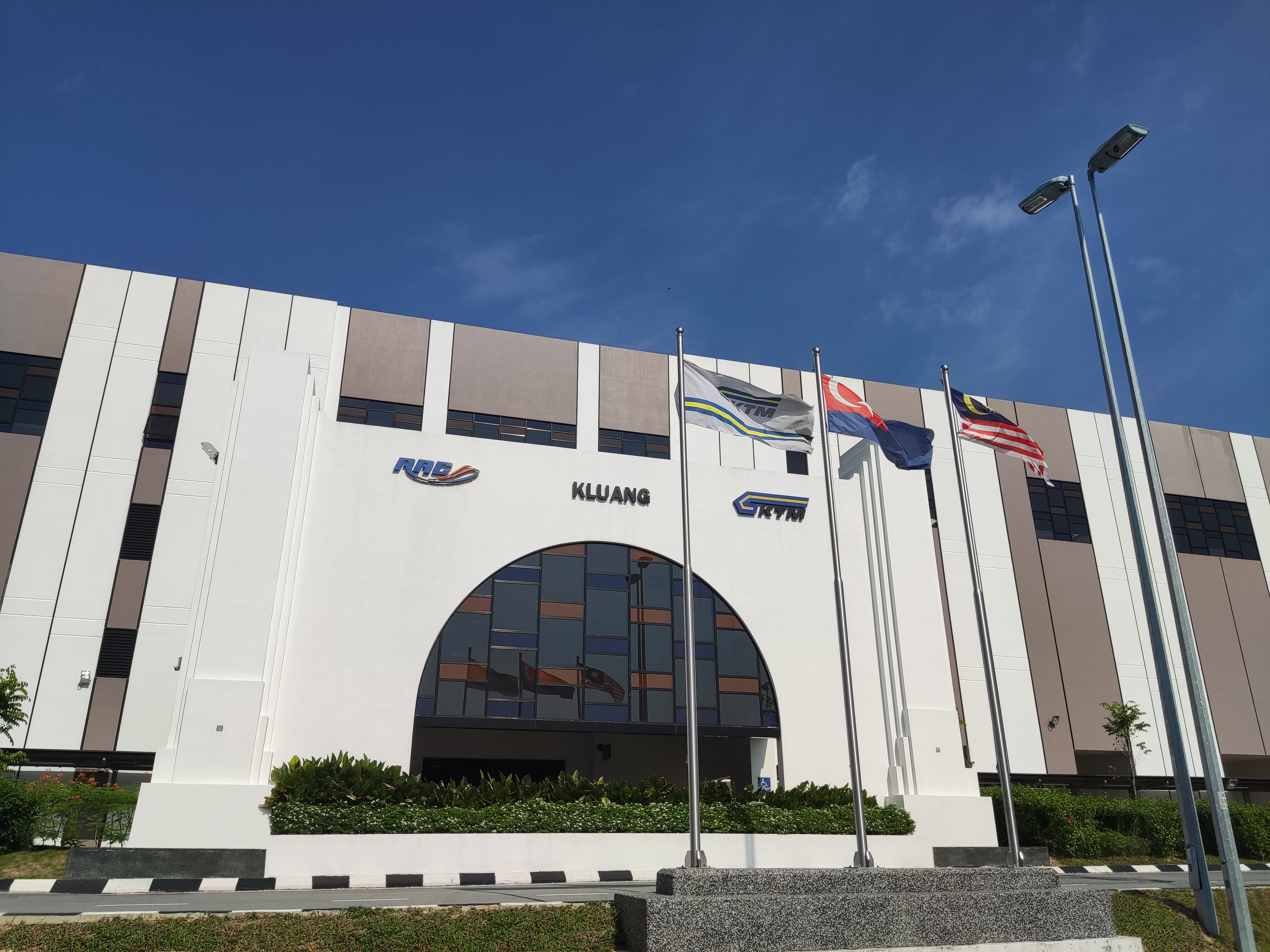

General information
- Other names: Malay: کلواڠ (Jawi); Chinese: 居銮; Tamil: குளுவாங்
- Location: Kluang, Kluang District; Johor; Malaysia
- Coordinates: 2°2′7.2″N 103°19′0″E
- Owner: Railway Assets Corporation
- Operator: Keretapi Tanah Melayu
- Line: West Coast Line
- Platforms: 2 side platforms
- Tracks: 2

Construction
- Structure type: Elevated
- Parking: Available
- Accessible: Yes

History
- Opened: 1909
- Rebuilt: 3 December 2024; 22 months ago
- Electrified: 23 August 2025; 13 months ago

Services
Preceding station	KTM Komuter	Following station
Paloh Terminus	Paloh–JB Sentral Line	Rengam towards Johor Bahru Sentral
Preceding station	ETS	Following station
Paloh towards KL Sentral	KL Sentral–JB Sentral (Platinum)	Rengam towards JB Sentral
Labis towards Padang Besar	Padang Besar–JB Sentral (Platinum)	Kulai towards JB Sentral
Labis towards Butterworth	Butterworth–JB Sentral (Platinum)	Kulai towards JB Sentral
Paloh towards Padang Besar	Padang Besar–JB Sentral (Gold)	Rengam towards JB Sentral
Preceding station	Keretapi Tanah Melayu (Intercity)	Following station
Segamat towards Tumpat	Ekspres Rakyat Timuran	Kulai towards Johor Bahru Sentral
Former services
Preceding station	Keretapi Tanah Melayu	Following station
Chamek Closed 2020 towards Padang Besar	West Coast Line	Rengam towards Woodlands
Location

Kluang railway station is a railway station located in the town of Kluang, within the Kluang District of Johor. It is centrally situated, with many key locations within walking distance. The station features elevated tracks with high-level platforms, retail spaces, and connections to the old station and a nearby bus stop, along with a network of sheltered walkways for passenger convenience.

The station is served by KTM Intercity’s Ekspres Rakyat Timuran service, which operates between JB Sentral and Tumpat along the East Coast Line, as well as by KTM ETS services since 2025.

== History ==
Since its opening, the station has provided intercity railway services connecting to various parts of the state and country. Prior to 2011, international services were available from Kluang to Tanjong Pagar in Singapore.

From late 2021 to 2023, passenger operations were shifted to a temporary station named 'Kluang Temporary Railway Station', utilising a makeshift platform south of the new station, to facilitate the Gemas–Johor Bahru electrification and double-tracking project (EDTP). The temporary station continued to use the old station building for passenger facilities, staff offices and ticket counters. The old station has since been named a heritage building, and houses a well known coffee shop within its premises named Kluang Rail Coffee. On 3 August 2022, the coffee shop received a Malaysia Book of Records (MBOR) recognition as the Oldest Railway Coffee Shop in Malaysia.

In August 2023, the station was double tracked, rebuilt and electrified, with new KTM ETS services connecting Kluang with Kuala Lumpur at KL Sentral and the respective stations in between. The service has since been extended to include services to Padang Besar, Butterworth and JB Sentral. The new ETS services replaced the former KTM Intercity Ekspres Selatan service between Gemas and JB Sentral, which was terminated on 1 January 2026.

== Gallery ==
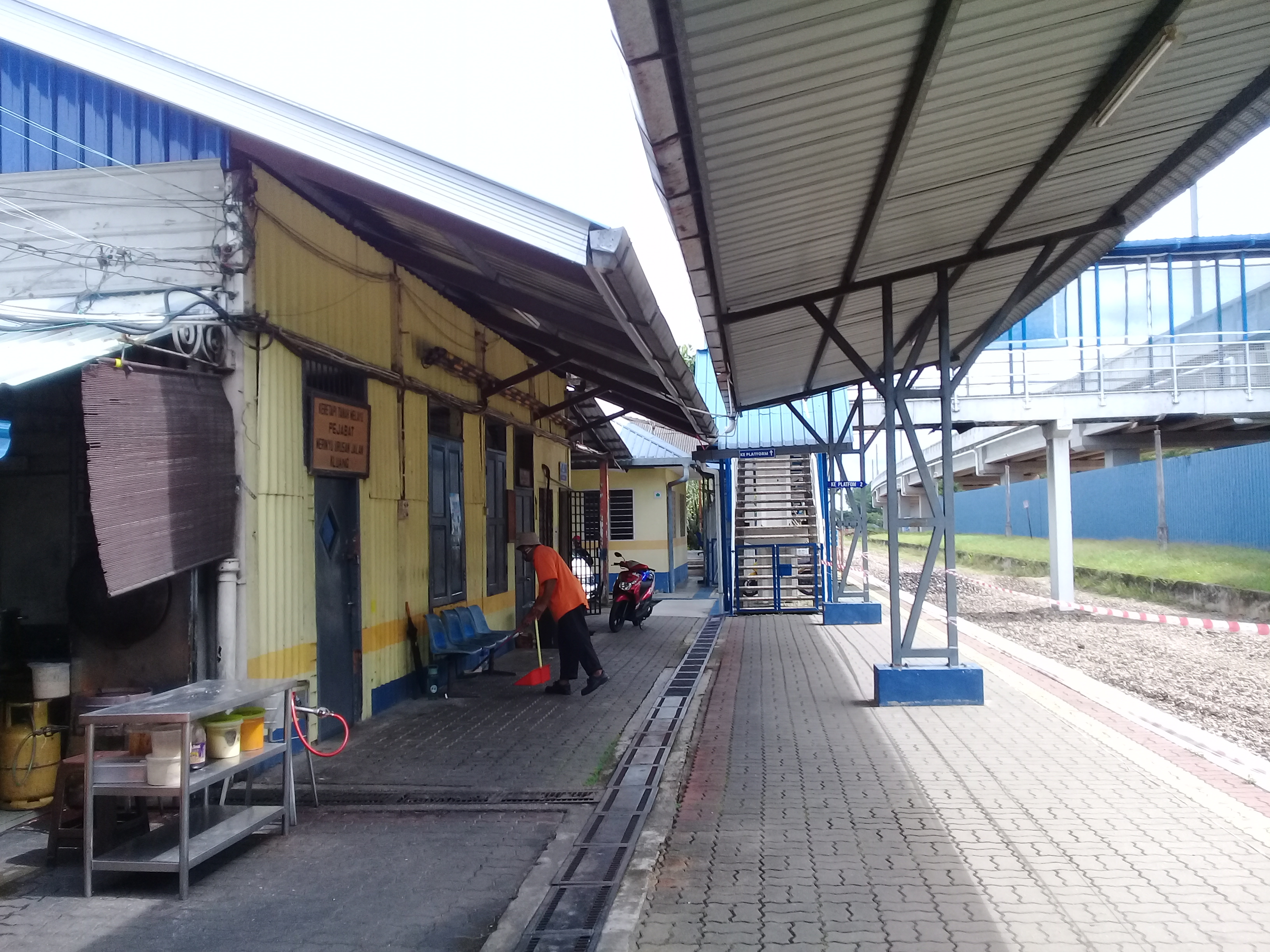
The old building of station.

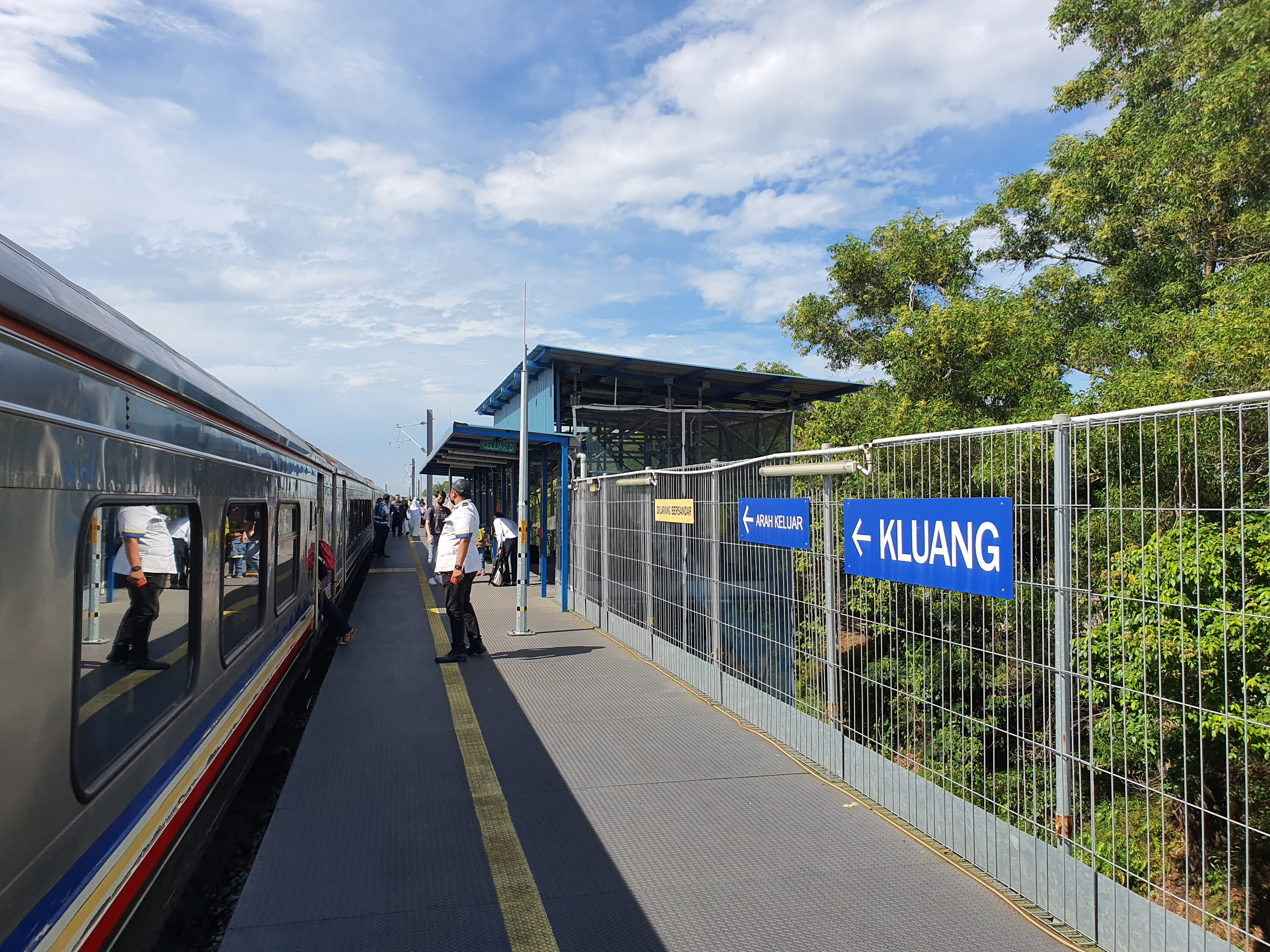
Temporary platform on June 6, 2023

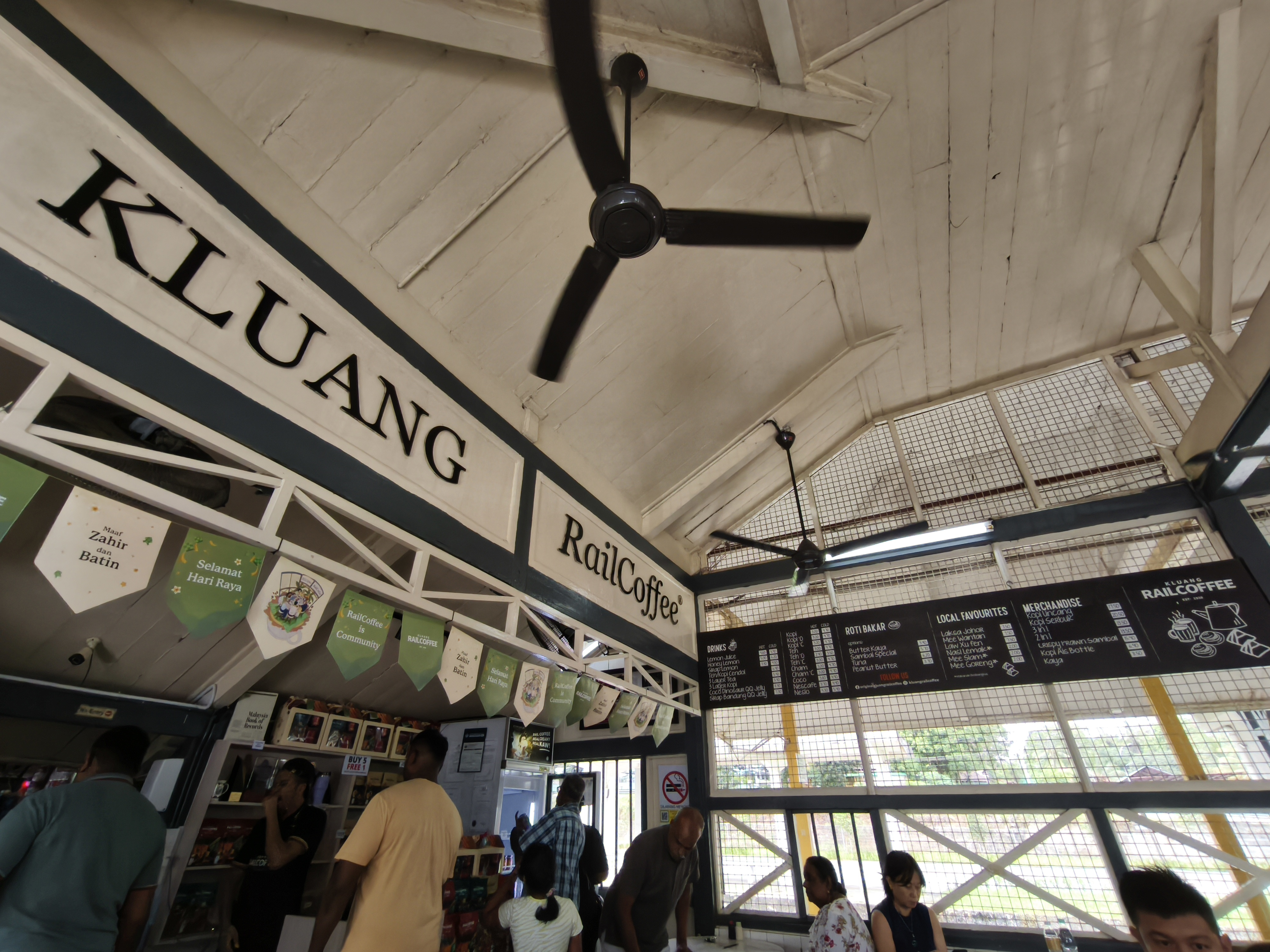
Kluang RailCoffee
