= Layang-Layang, Johor =

Town in Malaysia

Coordinates: 1°49′N 103°29′E

Layang-Layang is a town in Kluang District, Johor, Malaysia. It is situated within the parliamentary constituency of Simpang Renggam.

It is located approximately 72 km north of Johor Bahru and 32 km south of Kluang.

It was developed in the early 20th century and became one of the Chinese new villages during the military conflict between Malayan Communists and the Britain colonial government.

== Etymology ==
Layang-layang is the Malay word for "kite".

== Transportation ==
Layang-Layang is served by the Layang-Layang railway station.
