= Johor Port =

- Interactive map of Johor Port
- Native name: Pelabuhan Johor (Malay)

Location
- Country: Malaysia
- Location: Pasir Gudang, Johor Bahru District, Johor, Malaysia
- Coordinates: 1.438975°N 103.890297°E

Details
- Built: 1975
- Owned by: Johor Port Berhad
- No. of berths: 26

Statistics
- Website www.johorport.com.my

Johor Port (Malay: Pelabuhan Johor) is a port in Pasir Gudang, Johor, Malaysia, built in 1977. It is an integrated multi-purpose port facility providing bulk cargo, container and general cargo services. It is the world's largest palm oil terminal and ranks third globally in terms of LME cargo volume. It is the second busiest port in Johor, after Port of Tanjung Pelepas, which is located in the western part of the state and is the 15th busiest container port in the world.

== History ==
The Johor Port Authority was established in 1978, with the port being constructed the following year in 1979. The Johor Port Authority was incorporated in 1993, and in 1995 the port was privatized to Johor Port Berhad, which is now a wholly owned subsidiary of MMC Corporation Berhad.

== Facilities and services ==
With 5,500 ground slots and an annual capacity of 1,500,000 twenty-foot equivalent units (TEU), the terminal's equipment and facilities include:

- 8 container cranes, 5 of which are Post-Panamax
- 26 transfer cranes
- 6 reach stackers
- 46 prime movers
- Dedicated rail depot, connecting to the national rail network, Singapore and Thailand
- 70,000 sq. meters of warehouse space for containerized cargo

Since its inception, Johor Port has been handling liquid bulk cargo. Specifically, it provides facilities for edible oils - primarily palm and soybean oils - and petroleum products. The port has a freshwater capacity of 1.9 million liters to supply ships, which is done through hydrants on the wharves and the breasting island of the oil jetty.

For its bulk and break bulk operations, Johor Port has berths with an overall length of almost 2.4 km and nearly 200,000 sq. meters of storage facilities. The port's depth of 13.8 meters means it can accommodate dry bulk carriers up to 60,000 tonnes deadweight (DWT). Its gantry crane and the Impsamade level-stuffing crane can handle 800 tons per hour; the two wharf-side cranes can handle 400 tons per hour. Johor Port's terminal has 72,000 tons of covered storage space for edible cargo and 87,000 tons of covered space for non-edible products. A conveyor system allows cargo to be transported directly from ships to nearby warehouses.

Johor Port's 2008 activities were as follows:

- Liquid bulk: 40%
- Dry bulk: 14%
- General cargo (breakbulk): 8%
- Container: 38%

== Logistics subsidiaries ==
Johor Port Berhad operates two logistics subsidiaries at the port:

=== JP Logistics SDN BHD ===
JP Logistics (JPL) was established in 1996 as a wholly owned subsidiary, designed to handle the port's internal haulage and storage needs and provide logistics services across Malaysia and into neighboring Singapore. It also has operations in the Port of Tanjung Pelepas (PTP). JPL handles both full container loads (FCL) and less-than-container loads (LCL) shipments.

=== Bernas Logistics Sdn Bhd ===
Bernas Logistics (BLSB) is the logistics arm of Bernas, the national rice distributor, with a majority stake owned by Johor Port Berhad.

== See also ==
- Transport in Malaysia
