= Paloh railway station =

Railway station in Paloh, Malaysia

Paloh

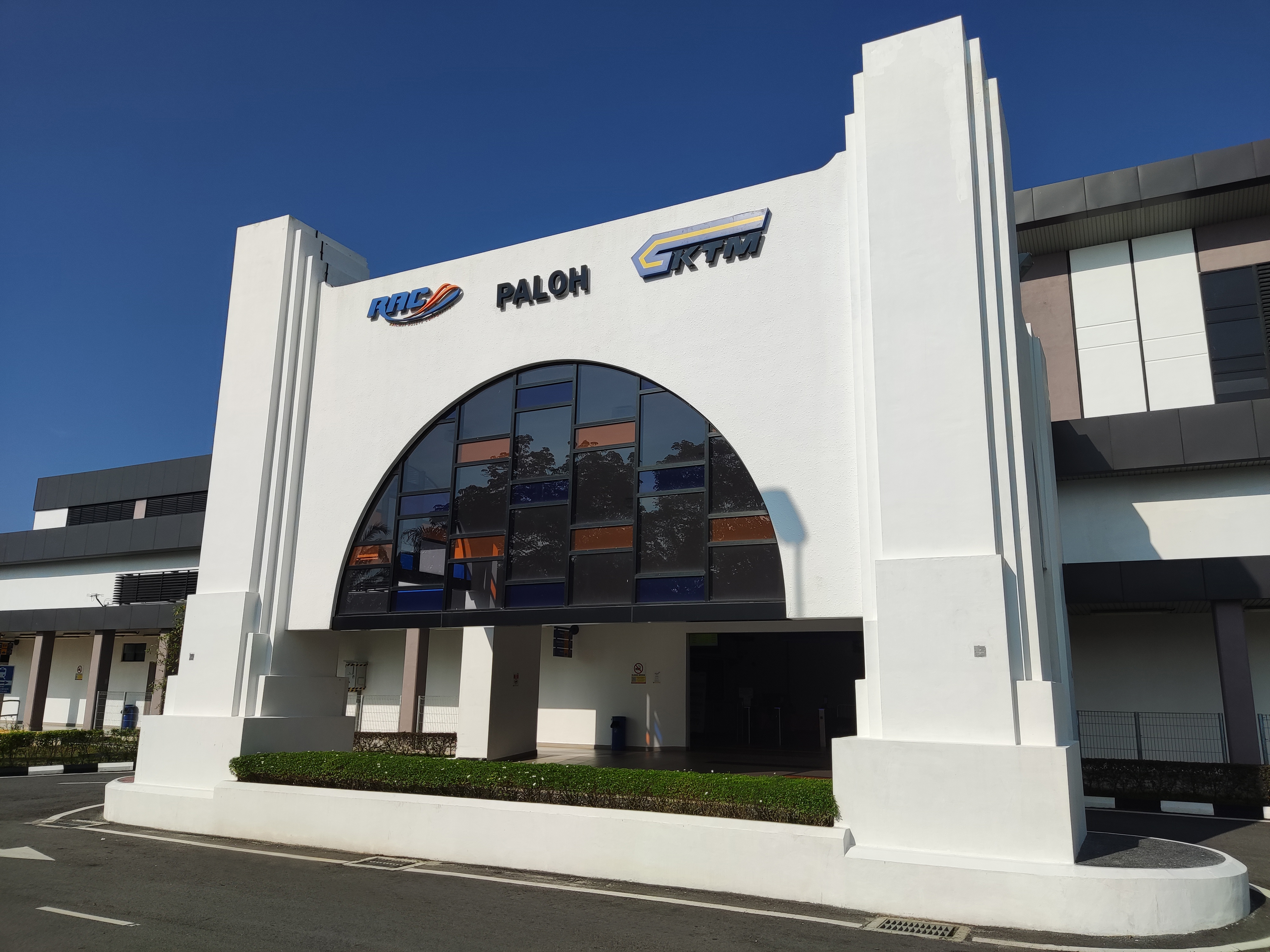

General information
- Other names: Malay: ڤالوه (Jawi); Chinese: 巴罗; Tamil: பாலோ
- Location: Paloh, Johor; Malaysia
- Coordinates: 2°11′26.8″N 103°11′24″E
- Owner: Railway Assets Corporation
- Operator: Keretapi Tanah Melayu
- Line: West Coast Line
- Platforms: 2 side platforms and 2 island platforms
- Tracks: 4
- Connections: Local transportation

Construction
- Structure type: At-grade
- Parking: Available, free
- Accessible: Yes

History
- Opened: 1909
- Rebuilt: 23 October 2024; 23 months ago
- Electrified: 2025

Services
Preceding station	KTM Komuter	Following station
Terminus	Paloh–JB Sentral Line	Kluang towards Johor Bahru Sentral
Preceding station	ETS	Following station
Bekok towards KL Sentral	KL Sentral–JB Sentral (Platinum)	Kluang towards JB Sentral
Bekok towards Padang Besar	Padang Besar–JB Sentral (Gold)	Kluang towards JB Sentral
Location

Paloh railway station is a railway station located at and named after the town of Paloh in the Kluang District of the state of Johor. The current station is a new station that is double-tracked, electrified and opened in 2025. It has capacity for both commuter and intercity services, the latter of which is currently running. The former Paloh station was demolished for the new elevated station as part of the Gemas-Johor Bahru electrification and double-tracking project (EDTP). During its construction, Paloh was served by a temporary station located nearby the current station.

The station currently provides higher speed electric train service towards Padang Besar, KL Sentral and JB Sentral. It was previously served by KTM Intercity's Ekspres Selatan service to JB Sentral and JB Sentral, which was terminated on 1 January 2026 to make way more KTM ETS services.

== See also ==
- Rail transport in Malaysia
