= Teluk Pulai =

Coordinates: 2°58′36.4″N 101°46′17.3″E

- Township
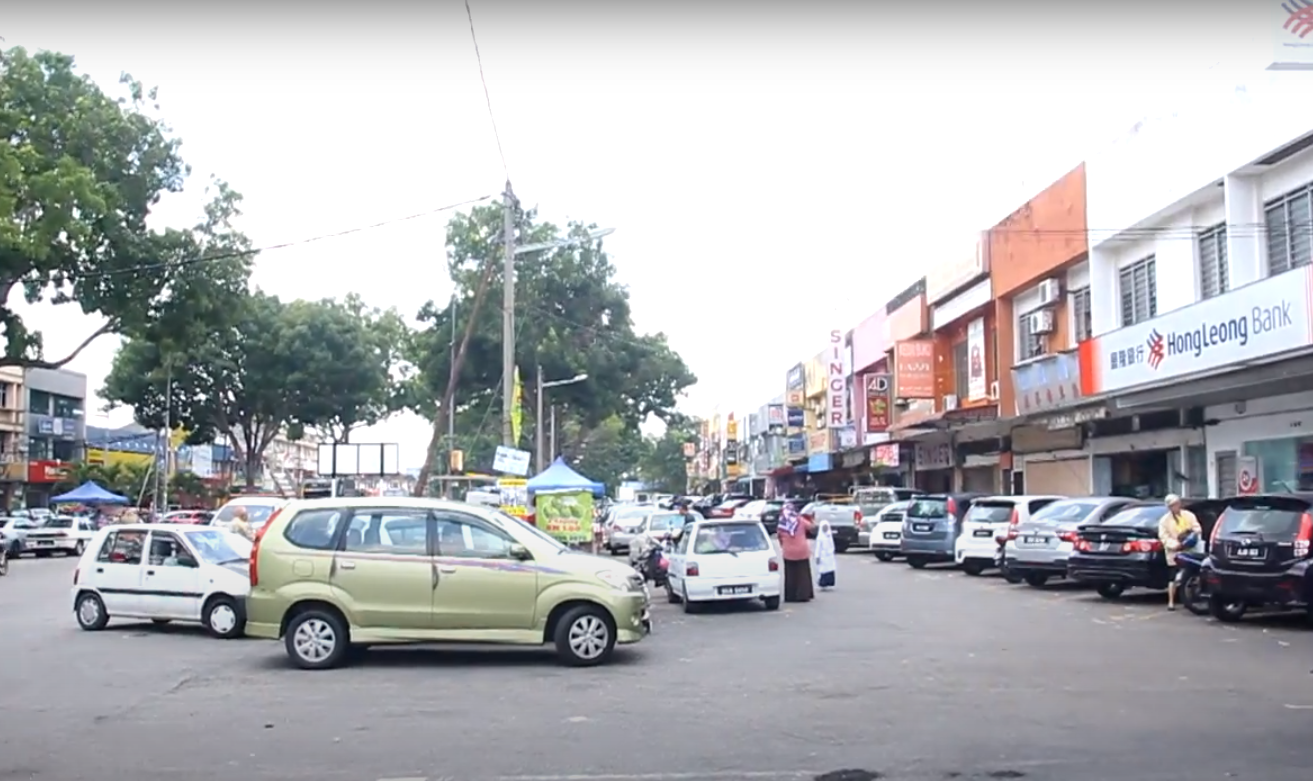
- Teluk Pulai Klang commercial area
- Nickname: TTP
- Location within Malaysia
- Country: Malaysia
- State: Selangor
- District: Klang

Government
  - Local Authority: Majlis Perbandaran Klang
  - Yang Dipertua: Noraini Roslan
- Time zone: UTC+8 (MST)
- Postcode: 41100
- Dialling code: +60 33

Teluk Pulai is a modern residential and township located within the Klang town center in the state of Selangor, Malaysia. Teluk Pulai falls under the jurisdiction of the Klang Municipal Council (MPK) and divided by two DUN state assembly jurisdiction which is Bandar Baru Klang and Selat Klang.

== Connectivity ==
Teluk Pulai is well connected to the Federal Highway through Jalan Raya Barat and the North Klang Straits Bypass as well North Klang Valley Expressway through Klang Third Bridge. Station KTM KD15 Teluk Pulai Komuter station is the rail public transportation serving the areas going directly to KL Sentral/Tanjong Malim or Port Klang. By 2023, Teluk Pulai will be connected with Shah Alam line LRT at BUK20 Klang which is about 1.2 km (0.75 mi) away from the areas heading towards Bandar Utama, Petaling Jaya and Johan Setia, Klang.

== Nearby residentials ==
- Taman Melawis
- Taman Teluk Pulai Indah
- Taman Teluk Pulai
- Taman Kota Jaya
- Taman Wangi
- Taman Aneka
- Kampung Sungai Udang
- Apartment Amazing Height
- Pangsapuri Anggerik
- Pangsapuri Saujana Damai

== Nearby landmarks and attractions ==
- Kota Raja Mahadi
  - Situated just next to Klang City Council MPK building, erected as a memorial of Klang War between Raja Abdullah and Raja Mahadi overlooking the Klang River.
- Pengkalan Batu Park
  - Used to be trading port for antique Klang, Pengkalan Batu now a public park to enjoy the scenery of Klang river it can be easily accessed by LRT BUK20 Klang by 2023.
- Hong Shan Si Temple (凤山寺)
  - A Taoism temple worshiping Nine Emperor Gods (九皇爷). Situated opposite commuter station. The Nine Emperor Gods Festival will be held from 1 to 9 September every year according to Lunar calendar. It is very crowded with worshipers.
- Teluk Pulai Local Night Market (Pasar Malam)
  - Situated at Jalan Teluk Pulai, 1 km (0.62 mi) away from the commuter station. It operates every Friday and Sunday night.
- Famous Bak Kut Teh Restaurants
  - Well-known Bak Kut Teh restaurants such as Teluk Pulai Bak Kut Teh and Klang Lek Bak Kut Teh are just five minutes' walking distance from Teluk Pulai commuter station.
- Tian Hock Kung Temple (天福宫)
  - Situated at Jalan Tepi Sungai. Famous for its snake theme temple architecture. Also known as Klang Snake Temple.
- Raja Muda Nala Bridge (Jambatan Raja Muda Nala)
  - Also known as Klang Third Bridge, connecting the northern and southern parts of Klang.

== Facilities ==
=== Shopping ===
- Econmart Jalan Sungai Bertik
- Pasaraya Matahari Jalan Teluk Pulai
- EcoShop Teluk Pulai
- Pasaraya MU
- Pasaraya MM
- Convenient store such as 99 Speedmart, 7-Eleven, KK Mart and Familymart.

=== Education ===
Primary schools

- Sekolah Jenis Kebangsaan (Cina) Chuen Min 循民华小
- Sekolah Kebangsaan Teluk Pulai
- Sekolah Kebangsaan Taman Gembira
- Sekolah Kebangsaan (Lelaki) Methodist ACS
- Sekolah Rendah Agama Jalan Hassan
- Sekolah Kebangsaan Telok Gadong
- Sekolah Kebangsaan Sungai Udang

Secondary schools

- Sekolah Menengah Kebangsaan Telok Gadong
- Sekolah Menengah Kebangsaan Methodist ACS
- Sekolah Menengah Kebangsaan Perempuan Methodist
- Sekolah Agama Menengah Sultan Hisamuddin

=== Government Department ===
- The Klang Municipal Council (MPK) building
- Civil Defense Department (JPA), Klang district office
- Department of Civil Works (JKR), Klang district office
- Sungai Bertik Health Clinic (Klinik Kesihatan)
