= Klang Komuter station =

Railway station in Klang, Malaysia

Coordinates: 3°02′35″N 101°27′00″E

Klang

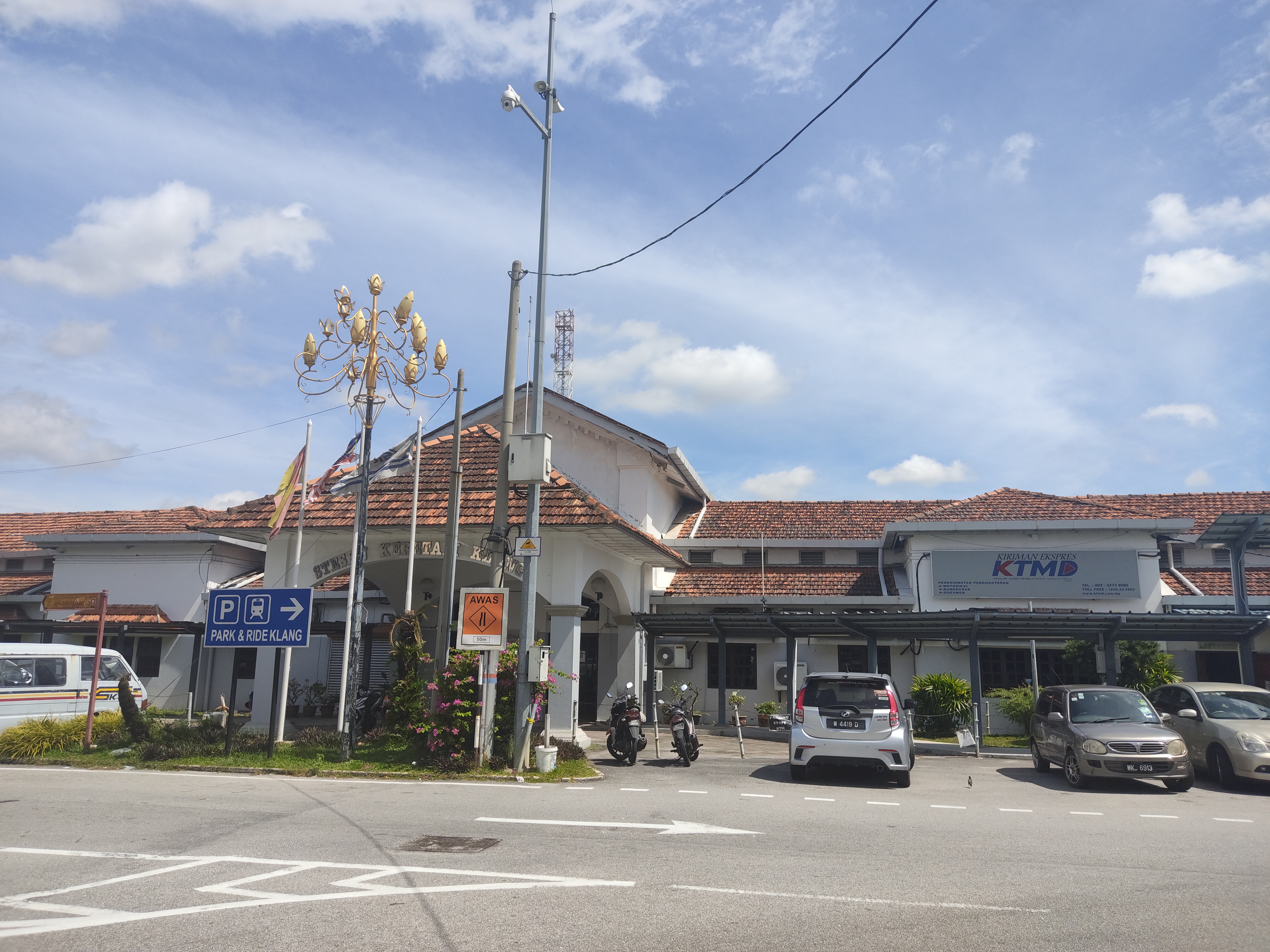

General information
- Other names: Malay: کلڠ (Jawi); Chinese: 巴生; Tamil: கிள்ளான்
- Location: Jalan Besar, Klang; Selangor; Malaysia
- System: KTM Komuter
- Owner: Railway Assets Corporation
- Operator: Keretapi Tanah Melayu
- Line: Port Klang Branch (West Coast Line)
- Platforms: 1 side platform; 1 island platform
- Tracks: 4
- Connections: 700-metre walking distance to SA20 Jambatan Kota for the Shah Alam Line

Construction
- Parking: Available

Other information
- Station code: KD14

History
- Opened: 1890
- Electrified: 1995

Services
Preceding station	Keretapi Tanah Melayu (Komuter)	Following station
Bukit Badak towards Tanjung Malim	Tanjung Malim–Port Klang Line	Teluk Pulai towards Port Klang
Location

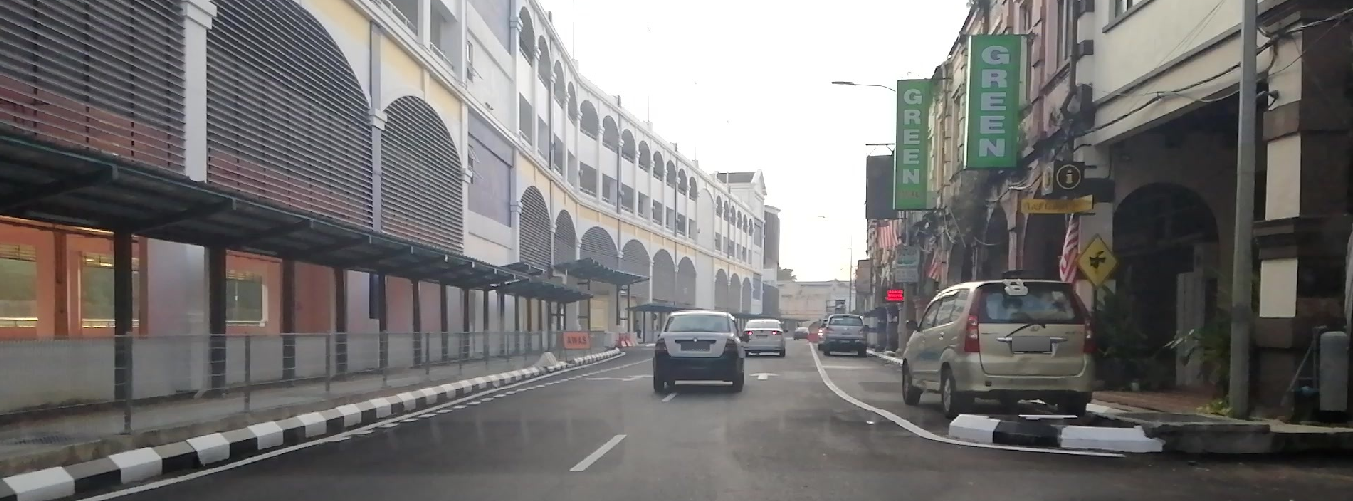
Jalan Raya Timur and multi storey carpark

The Klang Komuter station (formerly known as the Klang railway station) is a train station served by the KTM Komuter's Tanjung Malim–Port Klang Line train service in Malaysia. It is located on Jalan Besar, in the southern area of Klang. Parallel to this station is a KTM depot for locomotive and for repairing of freight wagons.

The station is located close to the central part of Klang city. It is served by a dedicated taxi and mini bus service. Klang Komuter Station is within walking distance of Klang's Central Bus Hub, which provides connectivity to the whole of Klang and the surrounding areas.

The main station building is a small single storied tiled roofed building that was originally built in 1890 but has undergone numerous renovation works; however, the Western colonial architecture of the station remains. Klang station has a side platform part of the main station building and an island platform reachable by a pedestrian bridge.

Recently Klang station has undergone upgrades where taller, and wider canopies have been erected on its island platform to replace its narrower outdated versions. However, the main station building nor its facilities have yet to see any major upgrades. There is a new multi storey carpark, opened since 2019.

== Service ==
Klang station's east-bound (Kuala Lumpur) platform. Part of the pedestrian bridge that links the island platform to the main building is visible.

Klang station's west-bound platform

Klang station is served by the KTM Komuter service via the Tanjung Malim–Port Klang Line, with intervals of 20-40 minutes. Services run between Port Klang and Tanjung Malim stations.

Although not designated as an official interchange, commuters may walk up to the Pasar Jawa LRT station on the Shah Alam Line which is a 700-metre walk from the Komuter station, taking approximately 5 to 10 minutes.

== Around the station ==
Klang station is situated in the middle of Klang old town, surrounded by historical sites within walking distance from the station. Known as one of the oldest towns in Malaysia, Klang is rich in history, tradition and customs.

- Church of Our Lady of Lourdes Klang
- Gedung Raja Abdullah (Museum)
- Istana Alam Shah (Royal Palace)
- Klang Magistrate Court Complex
- Little India (Along Jalan Tengku Kelana)
- Sri Nagara Thandayuthapani Temple
- Sultan Abdul Aziz Royal Gallery
- Sultan Sulaiman Royal Mosque
- Sultan Sulaiman Stadium (Klang Sport Center)
- Tengku Kelana Indian Muslim Mosque

The Royal Klang Town Heritage Walk on every Saturday and Sunday morning is a free guided tour.
