= Kampung Raja Uda Komuter station =

Railway station in Klang, Malaysia

Coordinates: 3°1′13″N 101°24′37″E

Kg. Raja Uda

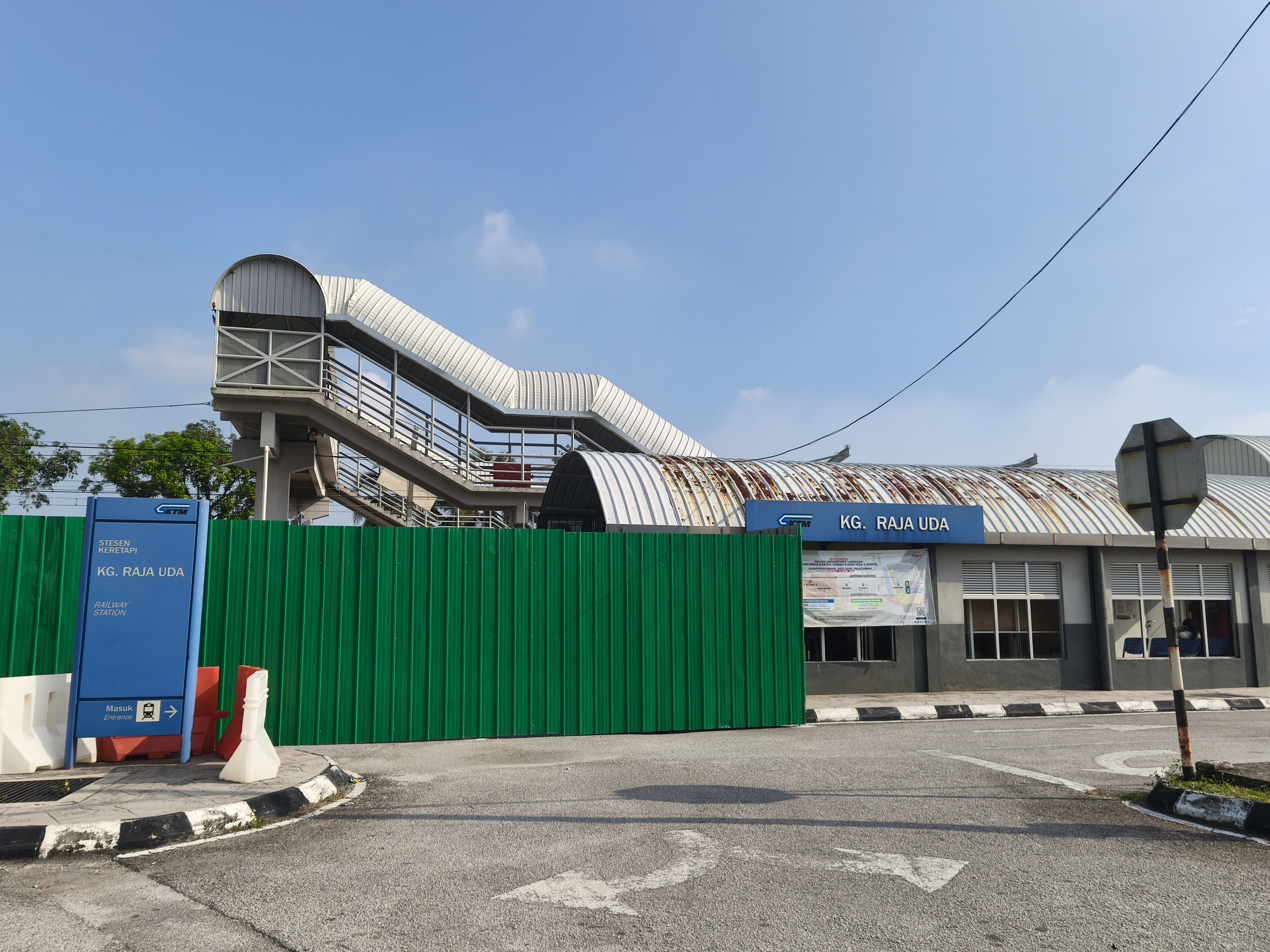

General information
- Other names: Malay: کامڤوڠ راج اودا (Jawi); Chinese: 甘榜拉惹乌达; Tamil: கம்போங் ராஜா ஊடா
- Location: Kampung Raja Uda, Klang, Selangor, Malaysia.
- System: KD17 | Commuter rail station
- Owner: Keretapi Tanah Melayu
- Line: Port Klang Branch
- Platforms: 2 side platforms
- Tracks: 2

Construction
- Parking: Available

Other information
- Station code: KD17

History
- Opened: 1995

Services
Preceding station	KTM Komuter	Following station
Teluk Gadong towards Tanjung Malim	Tanjung Malim–Port Klang Line	Jalan Kastam towards Port Klang
Location

The Kampung Raja Uda Komuter station is a commuter train stop located in Kampung Raja Uda, Klang, Selangor and served by the Port Klang Line of the KTM Komuter railway system.

The Kampung Raja Uda Komuter station was built in a suburban area and named after the village, Kampung Raja Uda, located northeast from Port Klang.

Kampung Raja Uda is located in a very accesible area, it only takes 10 minutes to Federal Highway, Kesas Highway, and the NKVE Highway.
