= Teluk Pulai Komuter station =

Railway station in Klang, Malaysia

Coordinates: 3°02′27″N 101°25′56″E

Teluk Pulai

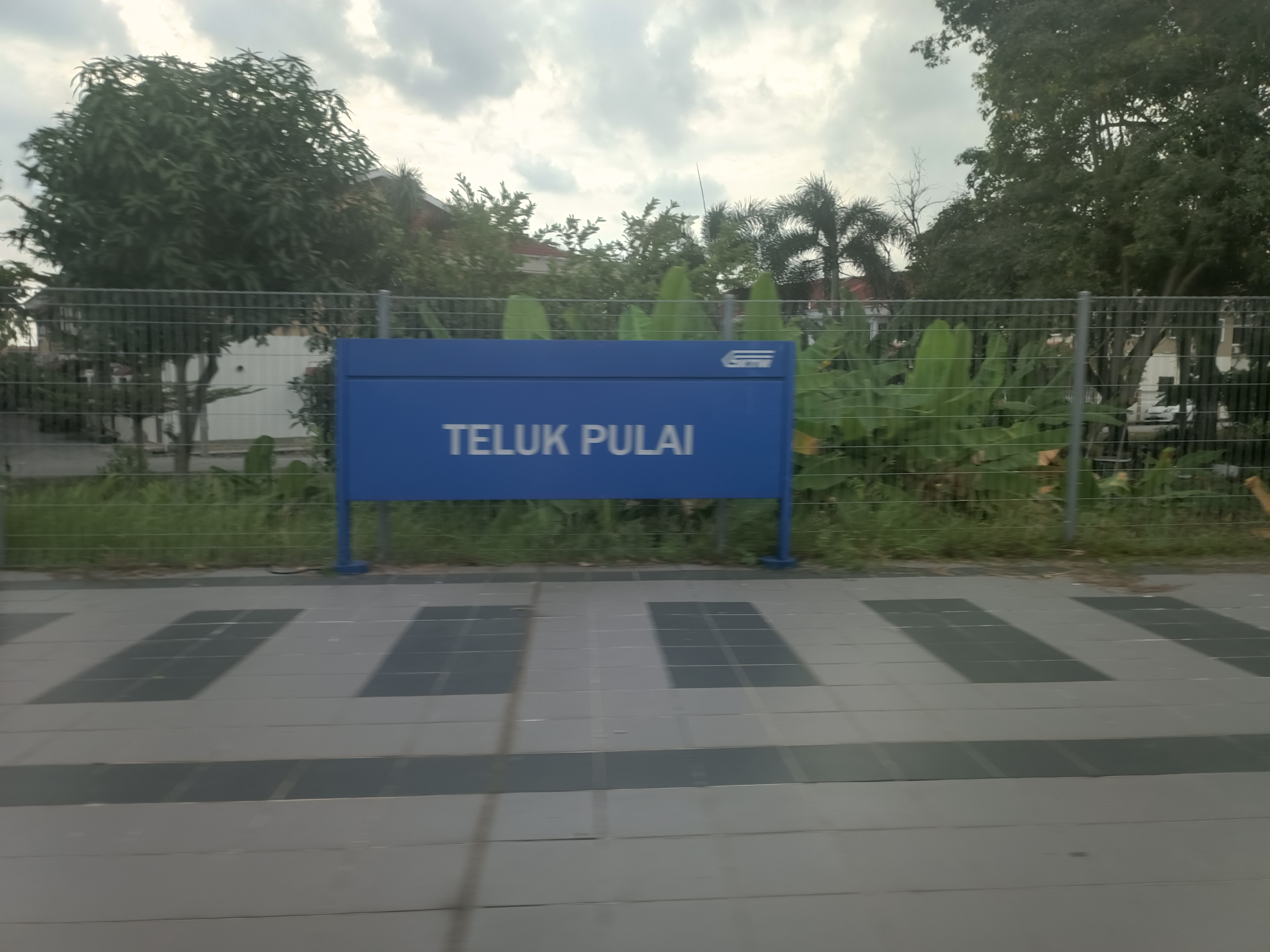

General information
- Other names: Malay: تلوق ڤولاي (Jawi); Chinese: 直落玻璃; Tamil: தெலுக் பூலாய்
- Location: Teluk Pulai, 41000 Klang, Selangor
- System: KD15 | Commuter rail station
- Owner: Keretapi Tanah Melayu
- Line: Port Klang Branch
- Platforms: 2 side platform
- Tracks: 2

Construction
- Parking: Available

Other information
- Station code: KD15

History
- Opened: 1995

Services
Preceding station	Keretapi Tanah Melayu (Komuter)	Following station
Klang towards Tanjung Malim	Tanjung Malim–Port Klang Line	Teluk Gadong towards Port Klang
Location

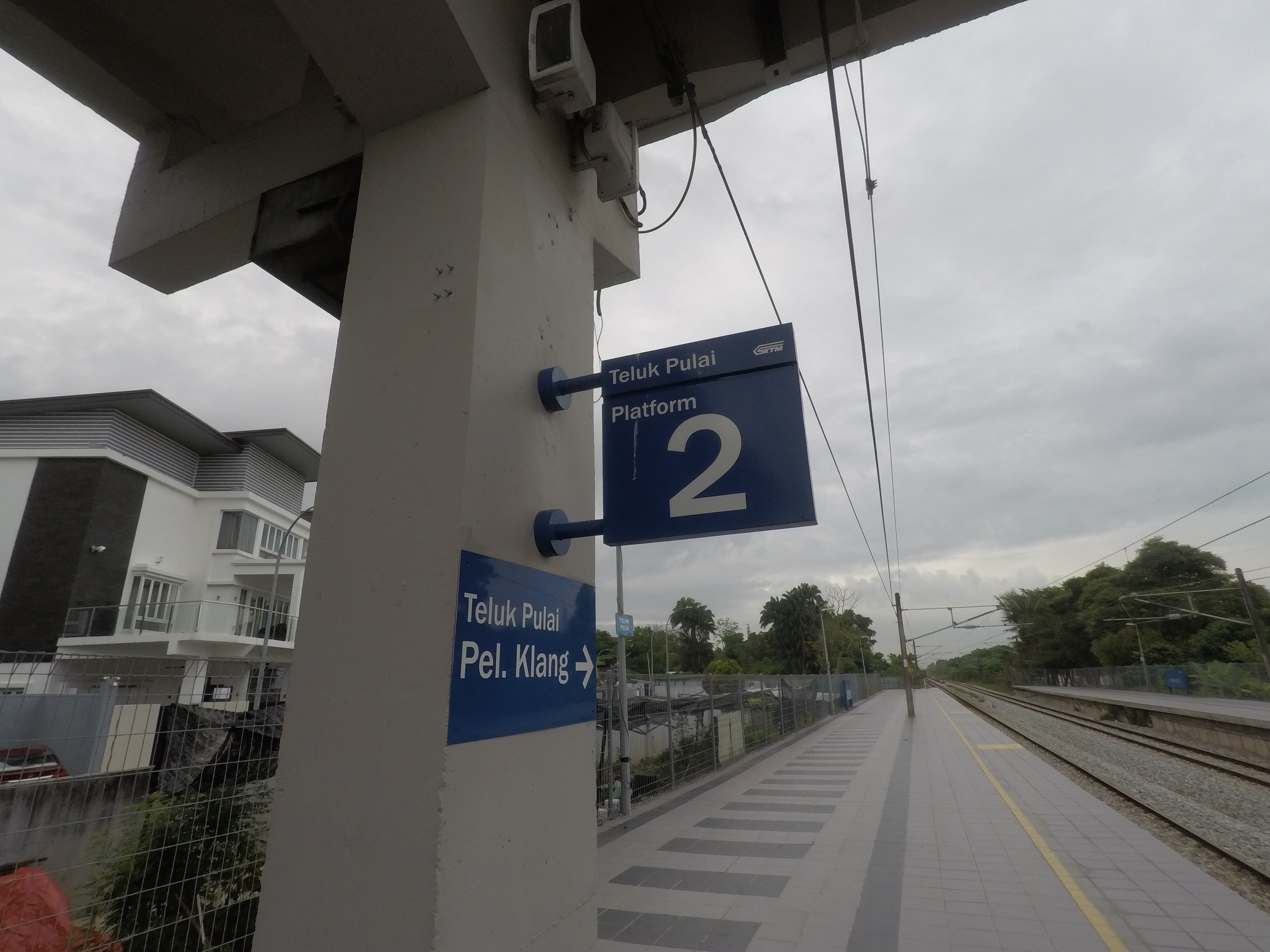
Platform signage at Teluk Pulai

The Teluk Pulai Komuter Station is a commuter train station operated by KTM Komuter and served by the Port Klang Line. This station is built to cater the traffic in Teluk Pulai a suburb in South Klang. The Klang Komuter Station, which also serves the same locality, is located 1 km away.

The Teluk Pulai Komuter Station is one of the earliest commuter station in Malaysia since commuter service is introduced in 1995. Teluk Pulai Station has undergone upgrades in 2020 to replace the old building built since 1995.

== Station Facilities and Services ==
The following facilities and services are available at this station.

- Touch N Go Lane
- Ticket Counter
- Ticket Vending Machine
- Wheelchair Ramp

== Nearby Landmarks and Attractions ==
- Hong Shan Si Temple (凤山寺)
  - A Taoism temple worshiping Nine Emperor Gods (九皇爷). Situated opposite commuter station. The Nine Emperor Gods Festival will be held from 1 to 9 September every year according to Lunar calendar. It is very crowded with worshipers.
- Teluk Pulai Local Night Market (Pasar Malam)
  - Situated at Jalan Teluk Pulai, 1 km away from commuter station. It operates every Friday and Sunday night.
- Famous Bak Kut Teh Restaurants
  - Well-known Bak Kut Teh restaurants such as Teluk Pulai Bak Kut Teh and Klang Lek Bak Kut Teh is just 5 minutes walking distance from the station.
- Tian Hock Kung Temple (天福宫)
  - Situated at Jalan Tepi Sungai. Famous for its snake theme temple architecture. Also known as Klang Snake Temple.
- Raja Muda Nala Bridge (Jambatan Raja Muda Nala)
  - Also known as Klang Third Bridge, connecting the northern and southern parts of Klang.
- Klinik Kesihatan Sungai Bertik
  - Government owned health center for residents staying in Teluk Pulai area.
- Sree Selva Vinayagar Temple
