= Bukit Badak Komuter station =

Railway station in Klang, Malaysia

Bukit Badak

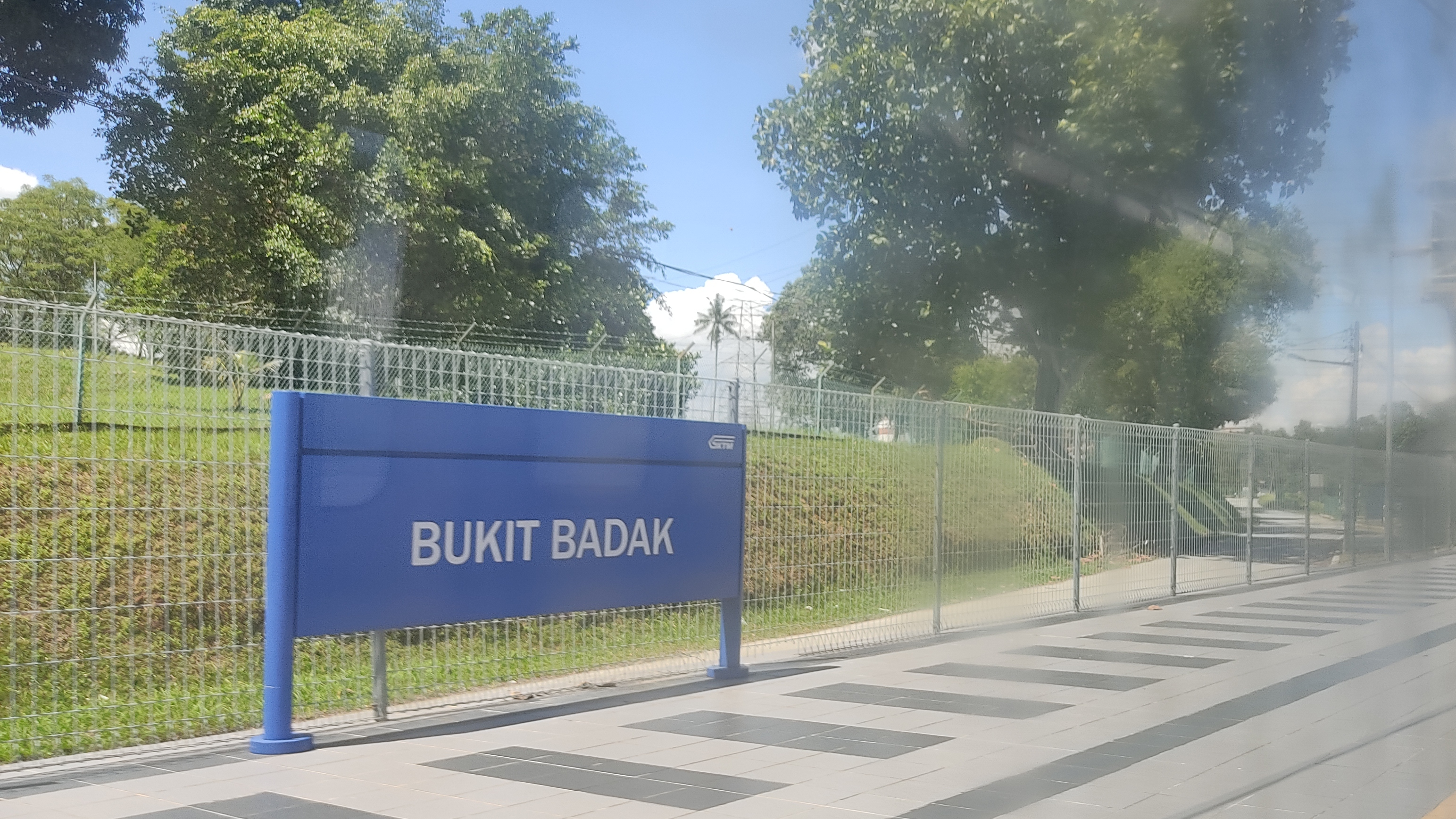

General information
- Other names: Malay: بوکيت بادق (Jawi); Chinese: 武吉巴达; Tamil: புக்கிட் பாடாக்
- Location: Jalan Bukit Badak, 41000 Klang, Selangor
- Coordinates: 3.0362°N 101.47036°E
- System: KD13 | Commuter rail station
- Owner: Keretapi Tanah Melayu
- Line: Port Klang Branch
- Platforms: 2
- Tracks: 2

Construction
- Parking: Available

Other information
- Station code: KD13

History
- Opened: 1995

Services
Preceding station	Keretapi Tanah Melayu (Komuter)	Following station
Padang Jawa towards Tanjung Malim	Tanjung Malim–Port Klang Line	Klang towards Port Klang
Location

The Bukit Badak Komuter station is a commuter train halt located in the eastern outskirts of Klang, Selangor, Malaysia which is served by the Port Klang Line of the KTM Komuter railway system. In the 1980s this station was known as Stesen Janatenaga LLN Station, (lit. LLN Electric Power Plant Station) named after an electricity generating plant nearby before assuming its current name.

== Location ==
This station is located in an isolated neighbourhood (Malay villages) with very few shoplots or facilities nearby. There is an electricity generating plant nearby by Tenaga Nasional Berhad (TNB), as well as some second-hand car dealerships.
