= Teluk Gadong Komuter station =

Train station in Klang, Malaysia

Teluk Gadong

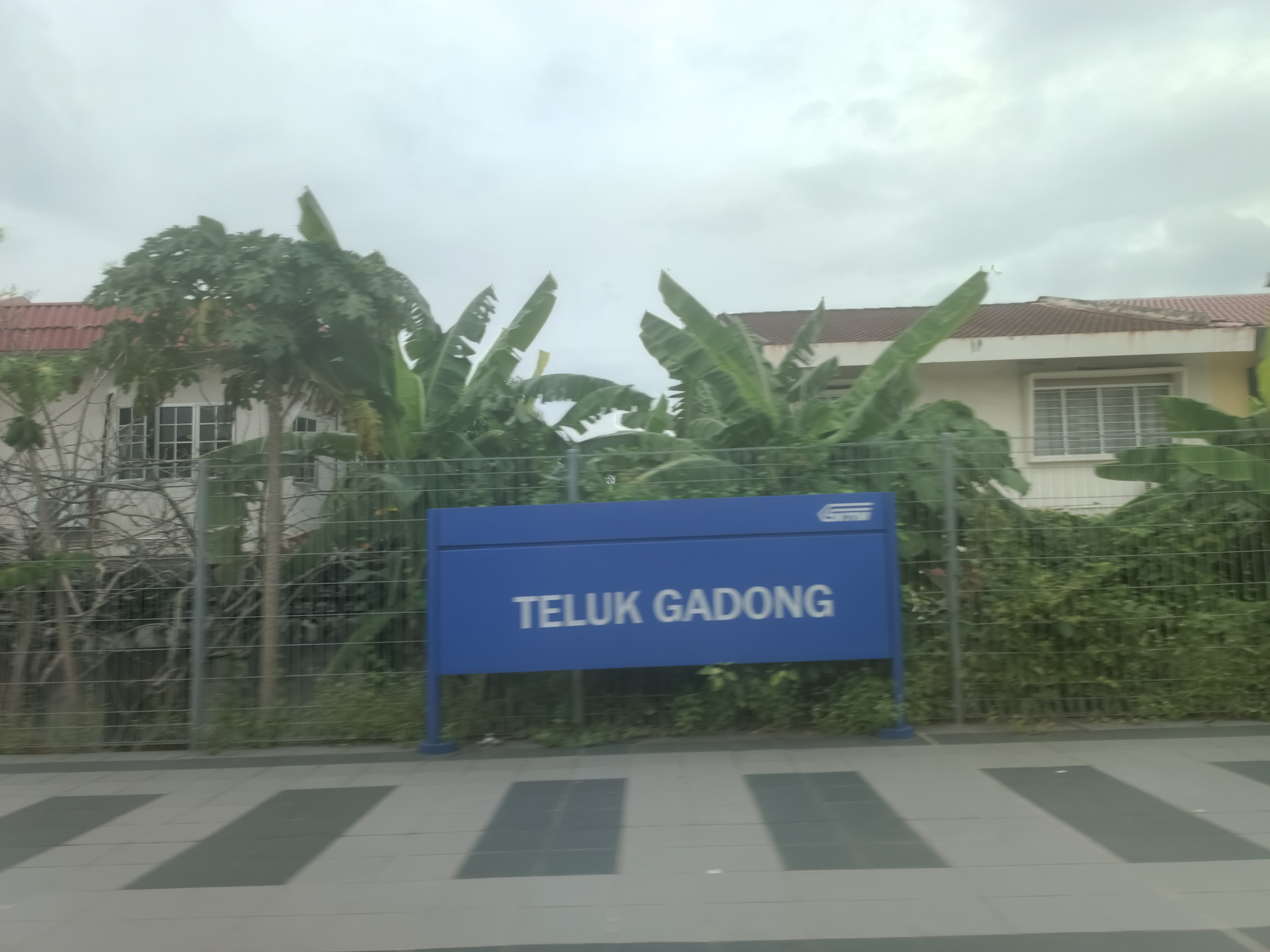

General information
- Other names: Malay: تلوق ݢادوڠ (Jawi); Chinese: 直落牙弄; Tamil: தெலுக் காடோங்
- Location: Teluk Gadong, Klang, Selangor, Malaysia.
- System: KD16 | Commuter rail station
- Owner: Keretapi Tanah Melayu
- Line: Port Klang Branch
- Platforms: 2 side platforms
- Tracks: 2

Construction
- Parking: Available in the vicinity

Other information
- Station code: KD16

History
- Opened: ~1995

Services
Preceding station	Keretapi Tanah Melayu (Komuter)	Following station
Teluk Pulai towards Tanjung Malim	Tanjung Malim–Port Klang Line	Kampung Raja Uda towards Port Klang
Location

The Teluk Gadong Komuter station is a commuter train halt located in Klang and served by the Port Klang Line of the KTM Komuter railway system.

The Teluk Gadong Komuter station was built to cater traffic in suburban area with the similar name called Teluk Gadong, located south-west from township of Klang. The station is located close to residential area and is within walking distance. The station usually busy during rush hours as it is used by residents there to reach their workplaces.

Taman Gembira is the nearest residential properties to this station.
