= Klang Bell =

Ancient bell found in Selangor, Malaysia

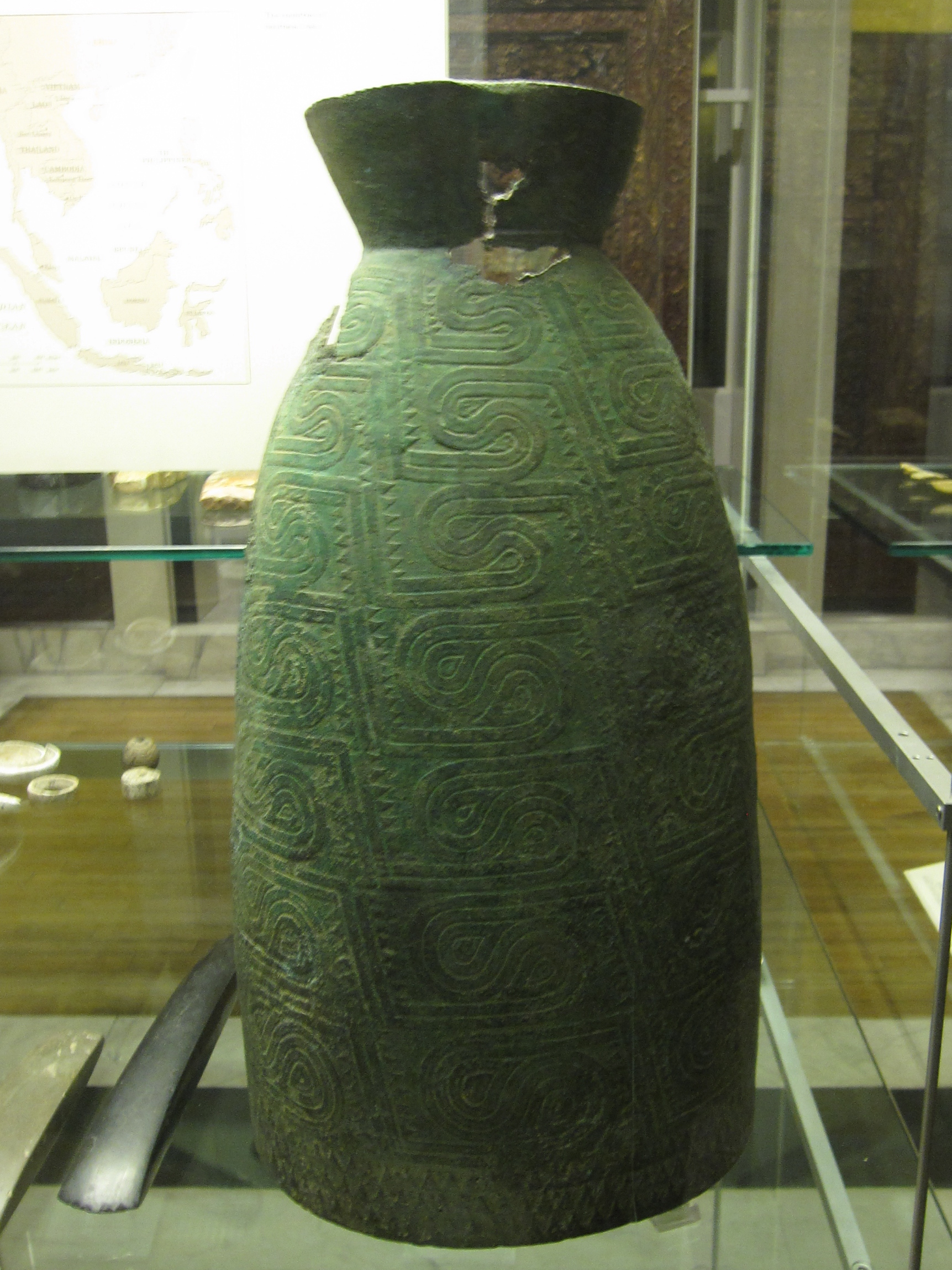
- Bronze bell from Klang, Malaysia on display at the British Museum
- Material: Bronze
- Size: 58 cm High, 31 cm Diameter
- Weight: 7.4 kg
- Created: 200 BC
- Present location: British Museum, London
- Registration: 1949,0715.1

The Klang Bell is an ancient bronze bell found in the city of Klang, Selangor state, western Malaysia. Estimated to date from the late Iron Age, the bell is a rare object of its genre and since 1949 has been part of the British Museum's Asian Collections.

== Discovery ==
Found with a number of iron tools in the city of Klang, the cast bronze artefact was one of three unearthed there; it is very similar to other bells that have been found in Battambang in Cambodia. One bell has been dated to AD 150.

== Description ==
The Klang Bell has a high, narrow body crowned by a cup-like lid and was designed to be worn by an elephant. The entire bell is decorated with vertical bands of rectangles composed of double spirals with central eyes motifs. In the lower part of the bell, three irregularly fashioned rows lie above a plain band. The bell is decorated in a similar way to the Dong Son drums that were produced in large quantities in Vietnam and elsewhere in southeast Asia between 600 BC and the third century AD, and are some of the region's finest examples of metalworking from this period.

== Gallery ==
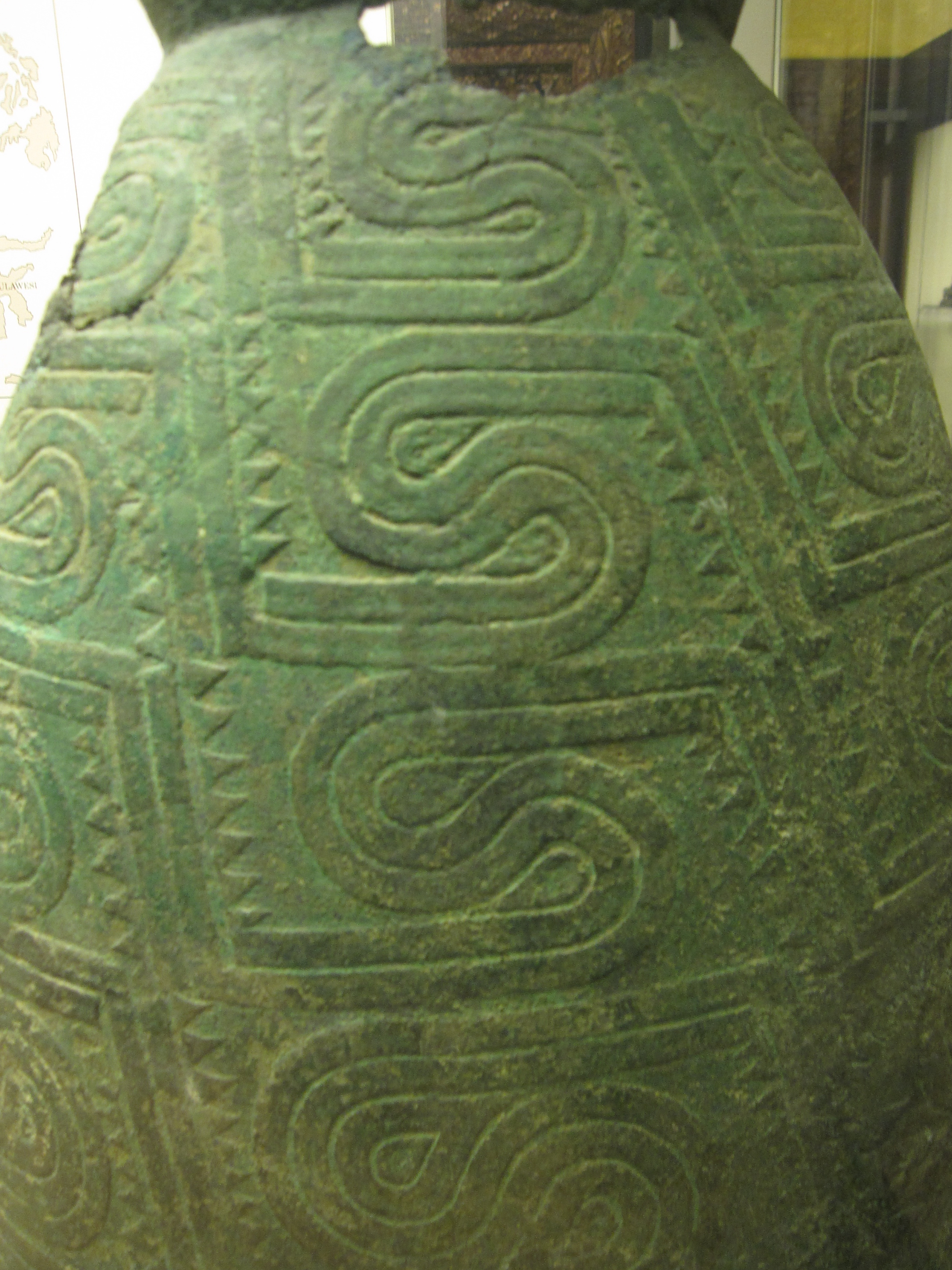
Detail of the bell from Klang
