= Tanjung Malim–Port Klang Line =

Railway line in Malaysia

KTM Tanjung Malim–Port Klang Line

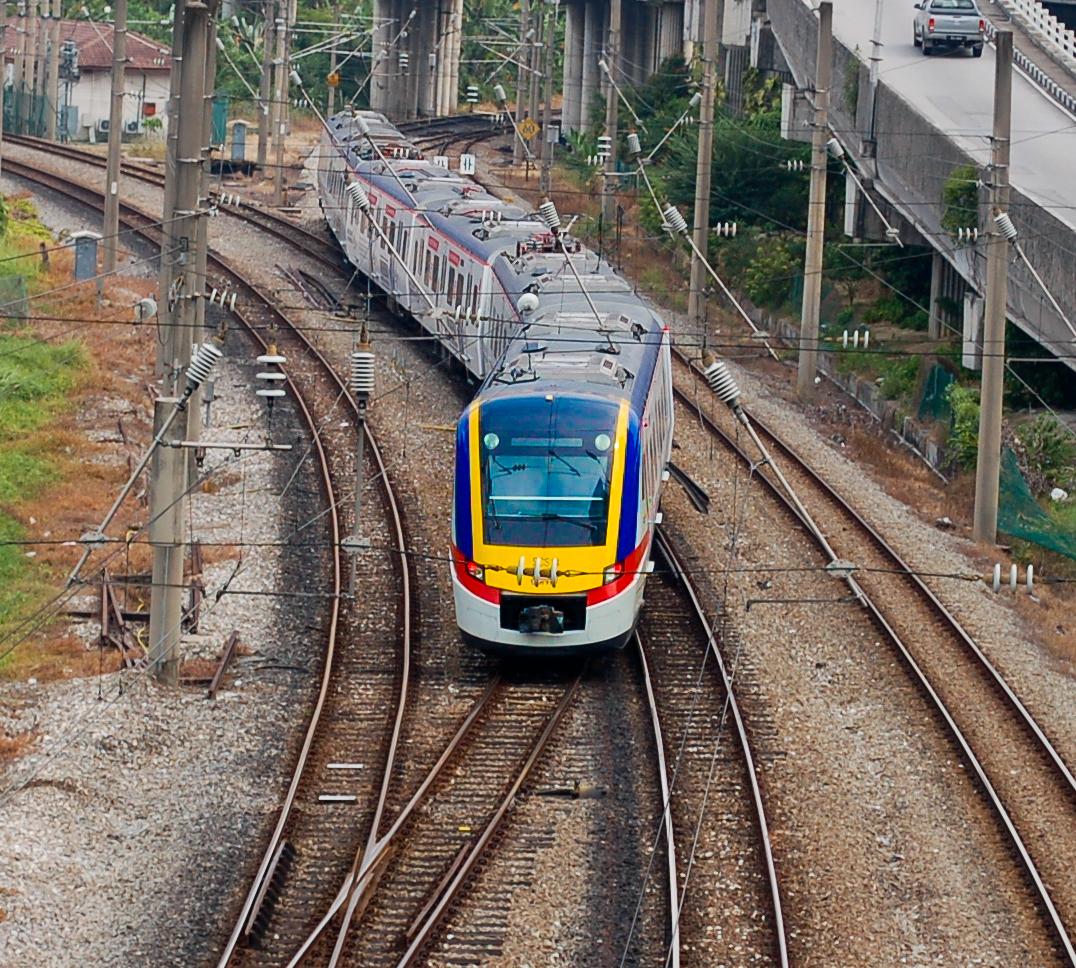
- KTM Class 92 trainset at KL Sentral/Bangsar Junction towards Port Klang

Overview
- Native name: KTM Laluan Tanjung Malim–Pelabuhan Klang
- Status: Operational
- Owner: Keretapi Tanah Melayu
- Line number: 2 (red)
- Locale: Perak; Selangor; Kuala Lumpur
- Termini: KA15 Tanjung Malim; KD19 Port Klang
- Stations: 35
- Website: www.ktmb.com.my

Service
- Type: Commuter rail (S-train)
- System: KTM Komuter; Klang Valley Integrated Transit System
- Operator: Keretapi Tanah Melayu
- Depot: Seremban
- Rolling stock: KTM Class 92 Komuter CSR EMU; 37 six-car trains

History
- Opened: 14 August 1995; 30 years ago

Technical
- Line length: 126 km (78 mi)
- Character: At grade
- Track gauge: 1,000 mm (3 ft 3 3/8 in) metre gauge
- Electrification: 25 kV 50 Hz AC Overhead line
- Operating speed: 125 km/h (78 mph)

Location of Port Klang Line

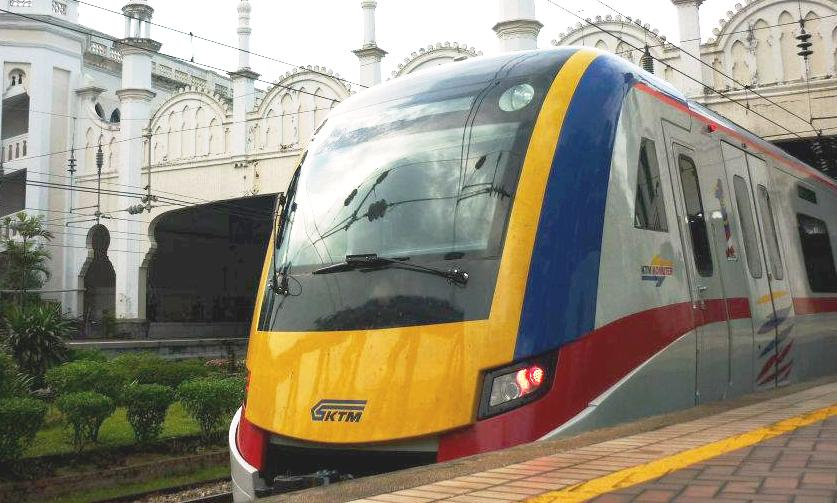
A KTM Class 92 EMU at Kuala Lumpur station

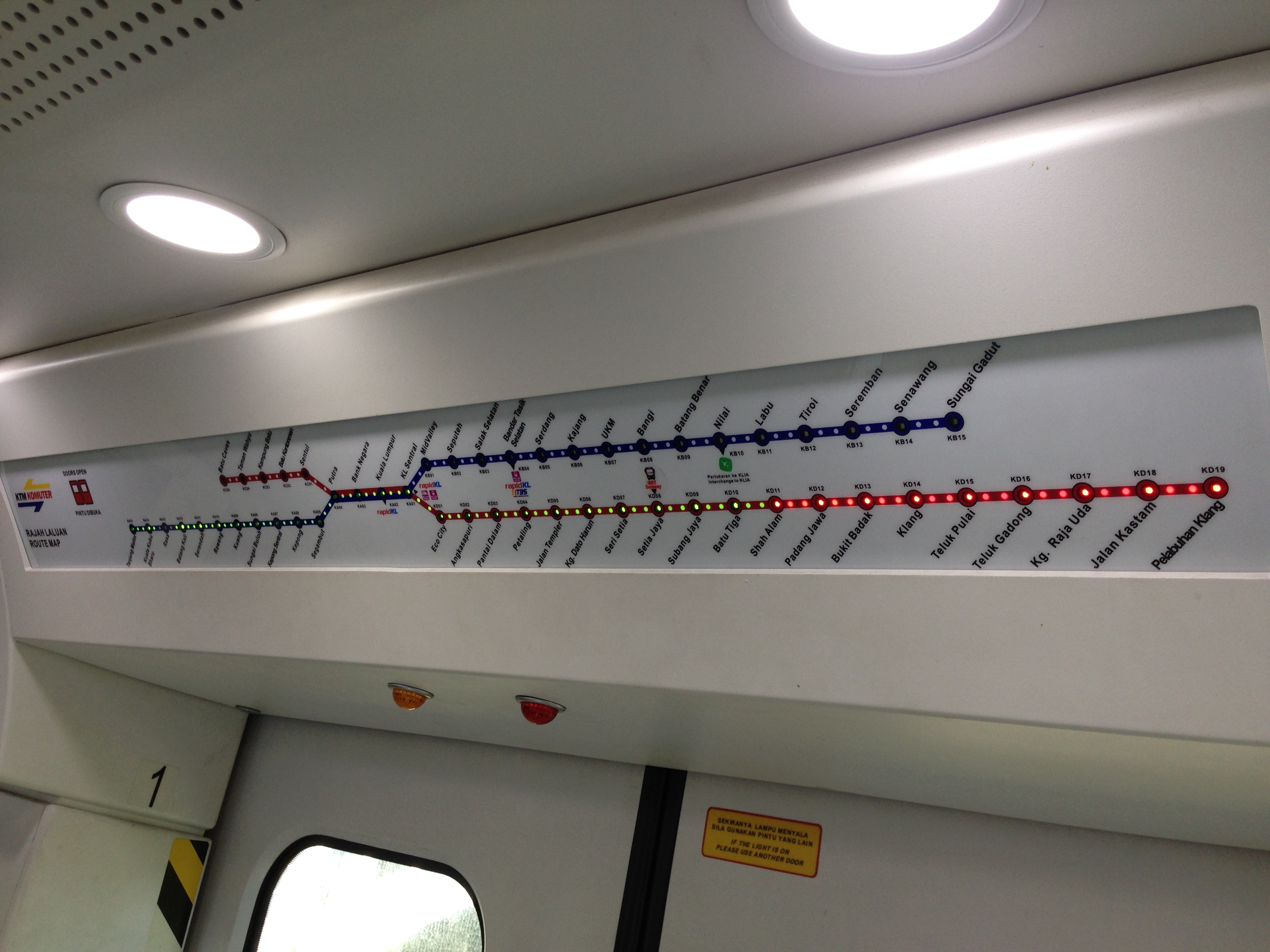
KTM Komuter dynamic route map display

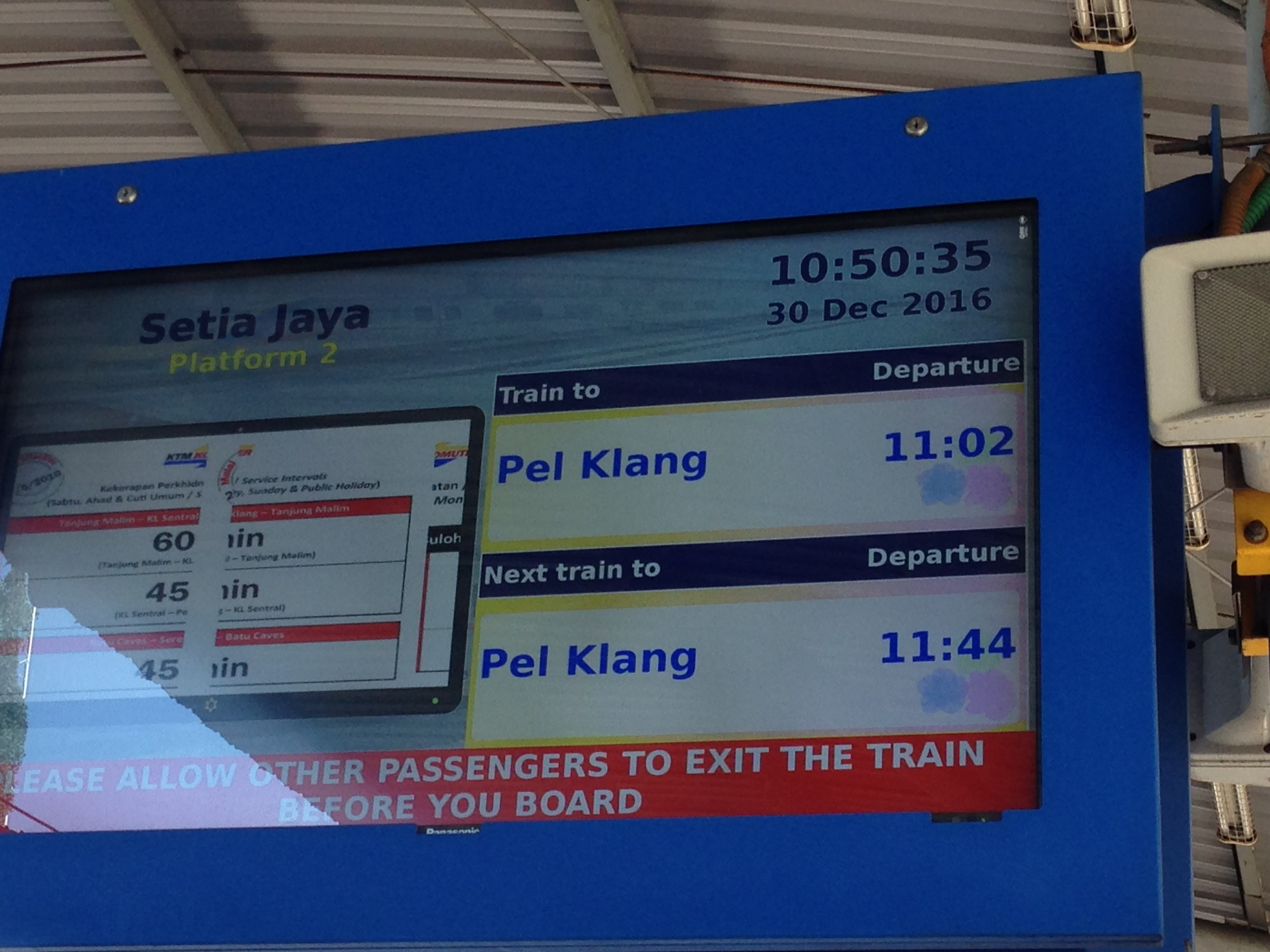
KTM Komuter passenger information display system (PIDS) at Setia Jaya station

The KTM Tanjung Malim–Port Klang Line (Malay: KTM Laluan Tanjung Malim–Pelabuhan Klang), formerly known as the Port Klang Line (Malay: Laluan Pelabuhan Klang) is one of the three KTM Komuter Central Sector lines provided by Keretapi Tanah Melayu. The electric trains run between Tanjung Malim and Port Klang. Prior to 15 December 2015, the northern terminus of this line was Batu Caves.

KTM Komuter is an electrified commuter train service first introduced in 1995, catering especially to commuters in Kuala Lumpur and the surrounding suburban areas. It is a popular mode of transportation for commuters working in Kuala Lumpur, as they can travel to the city without the hassle of traffic congestion. Coaches are modern and air-conditioned. For those who drive to the stations/halts, 'Park & Ride' facility is provided at a nominal charge.

The line is one of the components of the Klang Valley Integrated Transit System. The line is numbered 2 and coloured red on official transit maps. It was initially named after its current terminus, Port Klang station.

== Line information ==
=== History ===
The line began as the Selangor Government Railway which connected Bukit Kuda just outside Klang to Kuala Lumpur, opened in September 1886. In 1890 a bridge across the Klang River was constructed, allowing the railway to be re-routed to Bukit Badak and henceforth towards downtown Klang. The line was extended towards Segambut and Rawang in 1892, as a branch line from the Resident station. The railway reached Kuala Kubu Bharu in 1894 and finally Port Klang in 1899.

In 1989 railbus services were offered on the Sentul–Port Klang stretch. The same stretch, along with the Rawang–Seremban stretch, were electrified in the 1990s. Electrification was later extended to Batu Caves in 2009.

During colonial rule, there used to be a branch line from Padang Jawa to Kuala Selangor; the branch line was dismantled between 1931 and 1934.

At present, the Tanjung Malim–Port Klang Line is the oldest existing (and still operational) railway line in the country, taking the title after the Taiping–Port Weld line was dismantled in 1987.

=== Stations ===
⇄ = cross-platform interchange

Station code	Station name	Platform type	Interchange station/Notes
KA15	Tanjung Malim	Island & side	Northern terminus. ⇄ KTM ETS
KA14	Kuala Kubu Bharu	Side	
KA13	Rasa	Side	
KA12	Batang Kali	Side	⇄ KTM ETS
KA11	Serendah	Side	
KA10	Rawang	Island & side	⇄ KTM ETS
KA09	Kuang	Side	
KA08	Sungai Buloh	Side	Connecting station to PY04 MRT Putrajaya Line. ⇄ KTM ETS
KA07	Kepong Sentral	Side	Connecting station to PY08 Sri Damansara Timur on the MRT Putrajaya Line. ⇄ KTM ETS
KA06	Kepong	Side	Feeder bus T112 to PY09 Metro Prima for the MRT Putrajaya Line.
KA05A	Segambut Utara	Side	
KA05	Segambut	Side	Rapid KL bus route 190 to Mont Kiara and Sri Hartamas.
KA04	Putra	Side	Connecting station to AG4 SP4 PWTC on the LRT Ampang & Sri Petaling Lines via a 600-meter pedestrian bridge. ⇄ KTM Batu Caves-Pulau Sebang Line
KA03	Bank Negara	Side	Connecting station to AG6 SP6 Bandaraya on the LRT Ampang & Sri Petaling Lines via a 250-meter pedestrian bridge crossing the Gombak River and Jalan Kuching. ⇄ KTM Batu Caves-Pulau Sebang Line
KA02	Kuala Lumpur	Island & side	Connecting station to KJ14 KG16 Pasar Seni on the LRT Kelana Jaya Line and MRT Kajang Line via a 200-meter pedestrian walkway crossing the Klang River. ⇄ KTM Batu Caves-Pulau Sebang Line & KTM ETS
KA01	KL Sentral	Island	Connecting station to: KJ15 LRT Kelana Jaya Line; KE1 KT1 ERL KLIA Ekspres and ERL KLIA Transit; Linkbridge access to MR1 KL Sentral Monorail on the KL Monorail Line via NU Sentral; Linkbridge access to KG15 Muzium Negara on the MRT Kajang Line.; Feeder bus T819 to KG13 Pusat Bandar Damansara on the MRT Kajang Line. ⇄ KTM Batu Caves-Pulau Sebang Line, KS01 KTM KL Sentral-Terminal Skypark Line & KTM ETS
KD01	Abdullah Hukum	Side	Connecting station to KJ17 LRT Kelana Jaya Line. Link-bridge access to KB01 Mid Valley on the KTM Batu Caves-Pulau Sebang Line via KL Eco City, The Gardens Mall and Mid Valley Megamall.
KD02	Angkasapuri	Side	Half-hourly shuttle buses to the University of Malaya (UM) are available
KD03	Pantai Dalam	Side	Proposed connecting station with CC30 MRT Circle Line
KD04	Petaling	Island & side	
KD05	Jalan Templer	Side	
KD06	Kampung Dato Harun	Side	
KD07	Seri Setia	Side	
KD08	Setia Jaya	Island & side	Connecting station to SB1 Sunway-Setia Jaya on the BRT Sunway Line.
KD09	Subang Jaya	Side	Connecting station to KJ28 LRT Kelana Jaya Line. ⇄ KS02 KTM KL Sentral-Terminal Skypark Line
KD10	Batu Tiga	Side	
KD11	Shah Alam	Island & side	
KD12	Padang Jawa	Side	
KD13	Bukit Badak	Side	
KD14	Klang	Island & side	700-metre walking distance to SA20 Jambatan Kota on the LRT Shah Alam Line.
KD15	Teluk Pulai	Side	
KD16	Teluk Gadong	Side	
KD17	Kampung Raja Uda	Side	
KD18	Jalan Kastam	Island & side	
KD19	Port Klang	Island	Western terminus. Exit to Port Klang International Passenger Terminal to Pulau Ketam, Selangor, Malaysia & Dumai, Indonesia

=== KTM Komuter Trial Route ===
A new route for KTM Komuter services was introduced in preparation of the infrastructure upgrading works in the Klang Valley Double Tracking project in April 2016. It aimed to increase the frequency and the smooth running of the KTM ETS, KTM Komuter, KTM Intercity & Freight at the Central Sector.

The original Port Klang Line from Batu Caves-Port Klang route was changed to Rawang-Port Klang effective 15 December 2015.

=== Former Rawang–Tanjung Malim shuttle service ===
The KTM Komuter service was expanded to include three new stations beyond Rawang on 21 April 2007, under what was then known as the Rawang-Rasa shuttle service. The stations were Serendah, Batang Kali, and Rasa.

This 22 km stretch was the first portion of the Rawang-Ipoh double tracking and electrification project to become operational. The service was extended to Kuala Kubu Bharu on 5 January 2008. It was further extended to Tanjung Malim on 1 June 2009, and the service was renamed as the Rawang-Tanjung Malim shuttle service.

Until 11 July 2016, passengers had to disembark at Rawang and transfer to the Rawang-Tanjung Malim shuttle service for stations north of Rawang. Service ran at 30 minutes interval. The first and last trains to leave Rawang are at 05:42 and 21:24 while the first and last trains leaving Tanjung Malim are at 05:42 and 21:54. Journey time between Rawang and Tanjung Malim is 45 minutes.

Beginning 12 July 2016, the Rawang-Tanjung Malim shuttle was terminated and was fully integrated into the Port Klang Line as a through service, with trains running all the way to Tanjung Malim. The line was effectively named the Tanjung Malim–Port Klang Line.

=== KL Sentral–Terminal Skypark Line (Skypark Link) ===
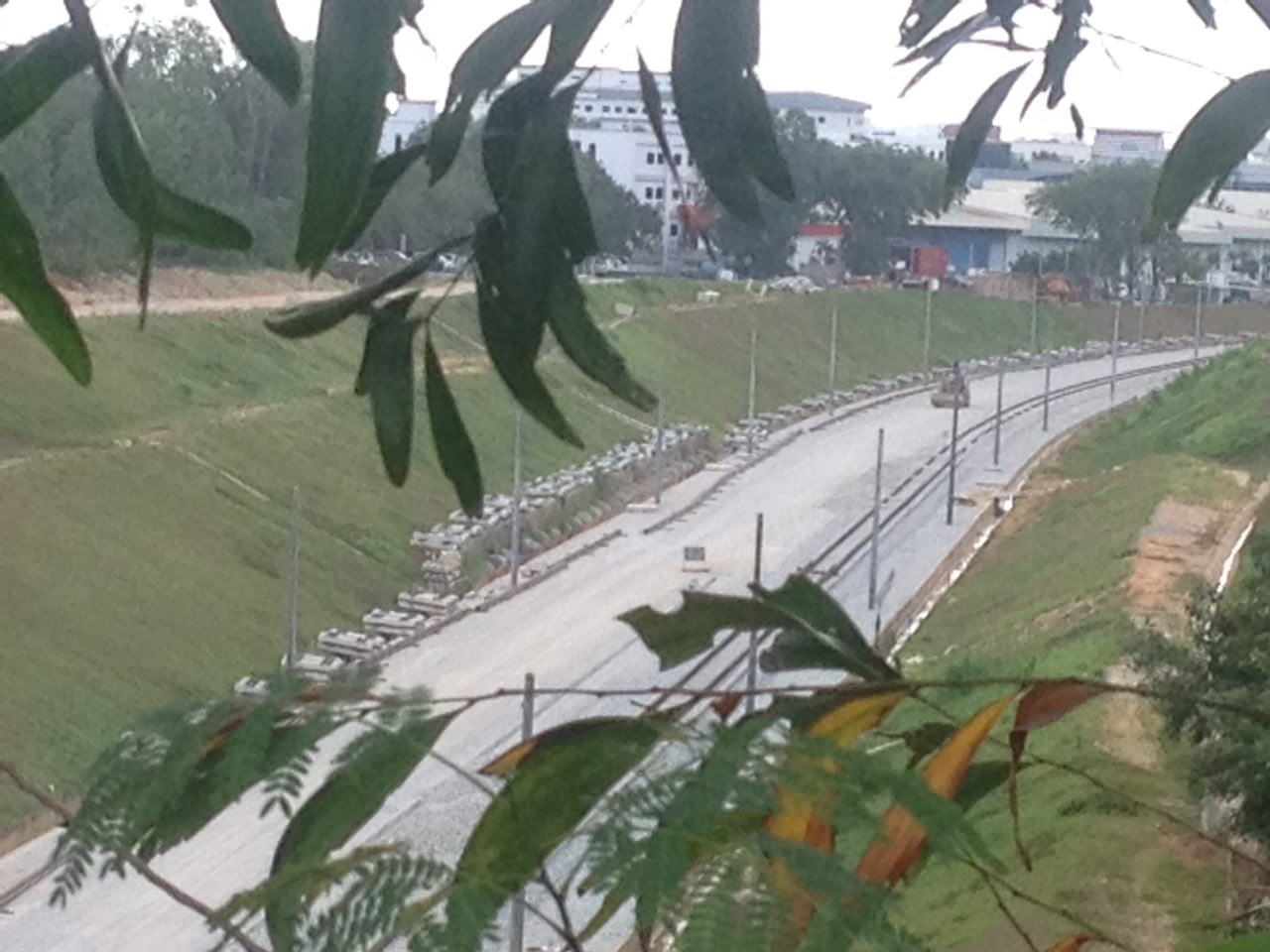
The construction of KL Sentral–Terminal Skypark Line taken from Persiaran Kerjaya

Since May 2018, a branch line of the Tanjung Malim–Port Klang Line was opened and extended to Terminal Skypark that serves the Sultan Abdul Aziz Shah Airport (Subang Airport). The line branches off to Subang Airport after Subang Jaya. The line is served by KTM Komuter's KL Sentral–Terminal Skypark Line (formerly known as Skypark Link), which runs an express Komuter service between KL Sentral and Terminal Skypark, only stopping at Subang Jaya station in between.

The service is currently suspended due to low ridership.

=== Service suspension at city centre and Segambut stations ===
From 3 June 2018 until early 2019, Tanjung Malim–Port Klang Line services at three stations in downtown Kuala Lumpur – Putra, Bank Negara and Kuala Lumpur, as well as Segambut were unavailable during off-peak hours, i.e. between 8 am and 6 pm, to facilitate track upgrading services (KVDT).

For the three city-centre stations - Putra, Bank Negara and Kuala Lumpur, Port Klang-bound trains served the stations between 06:30 and 07:50, while Tanjong Malim-bound trains called at the stations between 17:45 and 19:45.

For Segambut station, only six trains served the station everyday: three towards Tanjong Malim in the morning, and three towards Port Klang in the evening. Free shuttle buses on the route KTM3, provided by Rapid KL, provided a link between Segambut station and KL Sentral.

During off-peak hours, trains only shuttled between KL Sentral and Port Klang, and between Tanjung Malim and Kepong stations only. An hourly shuttle service between Klang and Setia Jaya was also introduced. Passengers could still travel to the Kuala Lumpur city centre on the MRT Kajang Line at Muzium Negara, or on the LRT Kelana Jaya Line at Subang Jaya and Abdullah Hukum.

=== Peak hour limited service between KL Sentral–Port Klang ===
From 20 January 2025 to 31 December 2025, Tanjung Malim–Port Klang Line services at stations between KL Sentral and Port Klang operated with an improved peak hour-only schedule, from Port Klang to KL Sentral with 6 trains in the morning from 6.03 am to 8.33 am (6.33 am - 9.03 am on weekends) with 30 minutes interval and from KL Sentral to Port Klang with 6 trains in the evening from 5.41 pm to 9.11 pm with 30- to 60 minutes interval, to facilitate the KVDT Phase 2 track upgrading project.

During off-peak hours, trains will only shuttle between KL Sentral and Tanjung Malim. For trips to Port Klang, passengers can use the LRT Kelana Jaya line service from KL Sentral to Subang Jaya station (or any available bus services from the stations between the KL Sentral-Subang Jaya alignment, such as RapidKL routes 641 or 782), then ride the free shuttle bus services provided at Subang Jaya station to selected Komuter stations with 30 minutes interval, operates from 7.00 am to 11.00 pm. The first route provides a link between Subang Jaya station and Batu Tiga, Shah Alam and Padang Jawa; the second route links Subang Jaya with Teluk Gadong; the third route links Subang Jaya with Klang; the fourth links Subang Jaya with Bukit Badak; and the fifth route links Subang Jaya with Port Klang.

== Future infill stations ==
An infill station between the Kuala Lumpur station and Bank Negara, planned to serve the Royal Malaysian Police (PDRM) headquarters at Bukit Aman, is currently being studied.

== Rolling stock ==
The line uses KTM Class 92 trains in 6 car formations.

== Gallery ==
Tanjung Malim
Current northern terminus of the Tanjung Malim–Port Klang line since December 2015

Abdullah Hukum
The latest KTM station addition to the Tanjung Malim–Port Klang line, which was built after the completion of KL Eco City

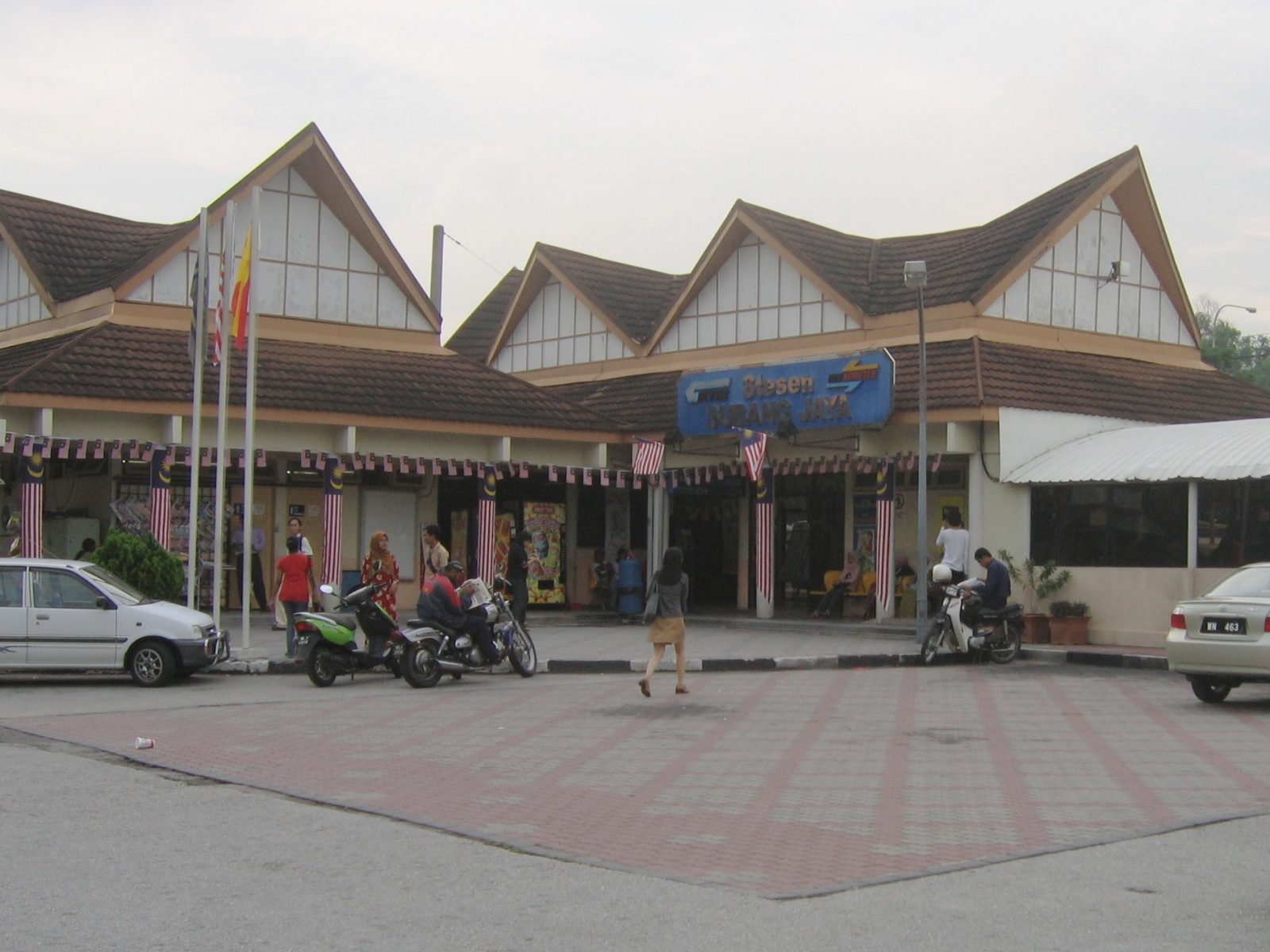
Subang Jaya
Before redevelopment in 2015

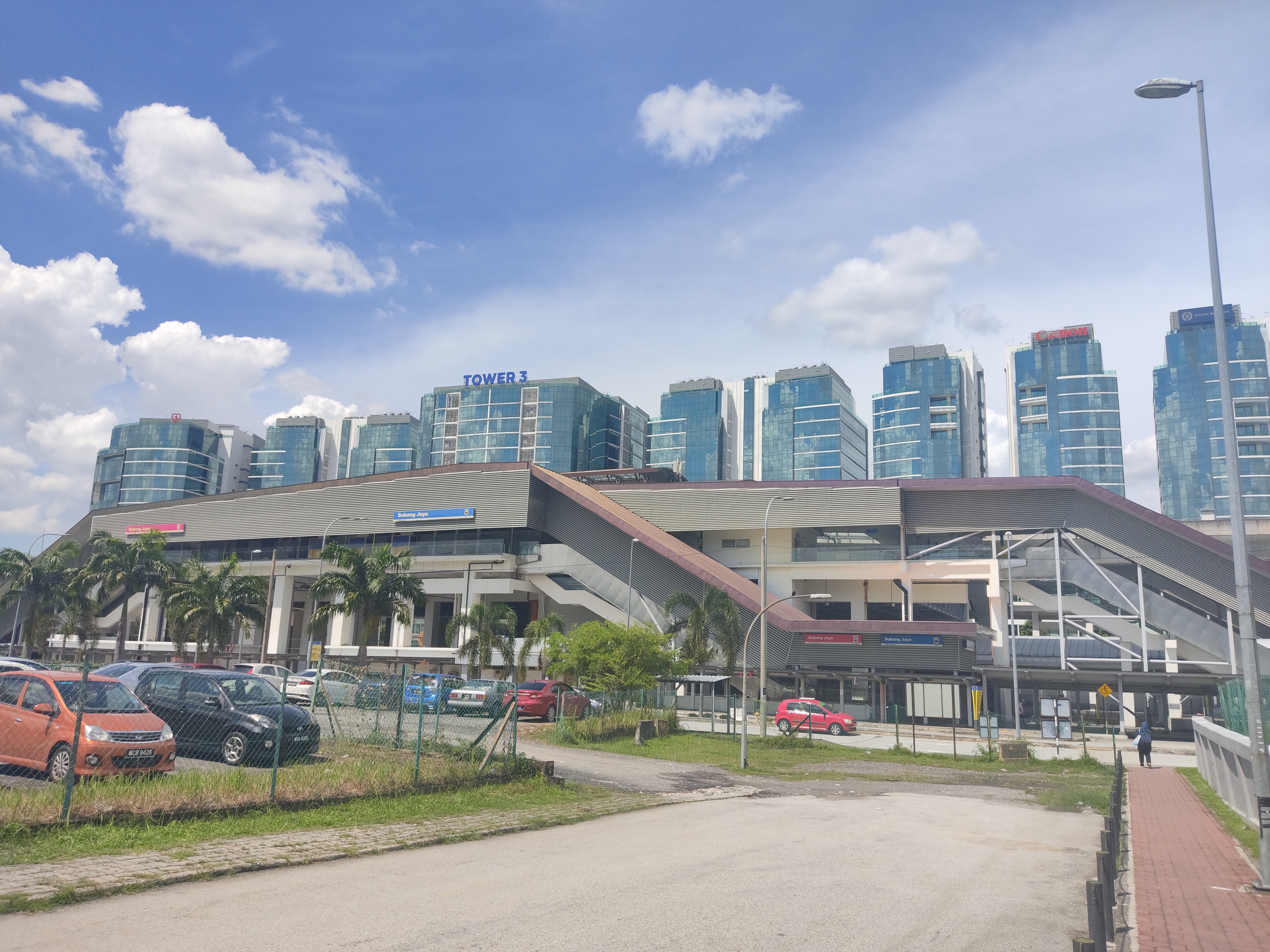
Subang Jaya
After redevelopment that was completed in June 2016

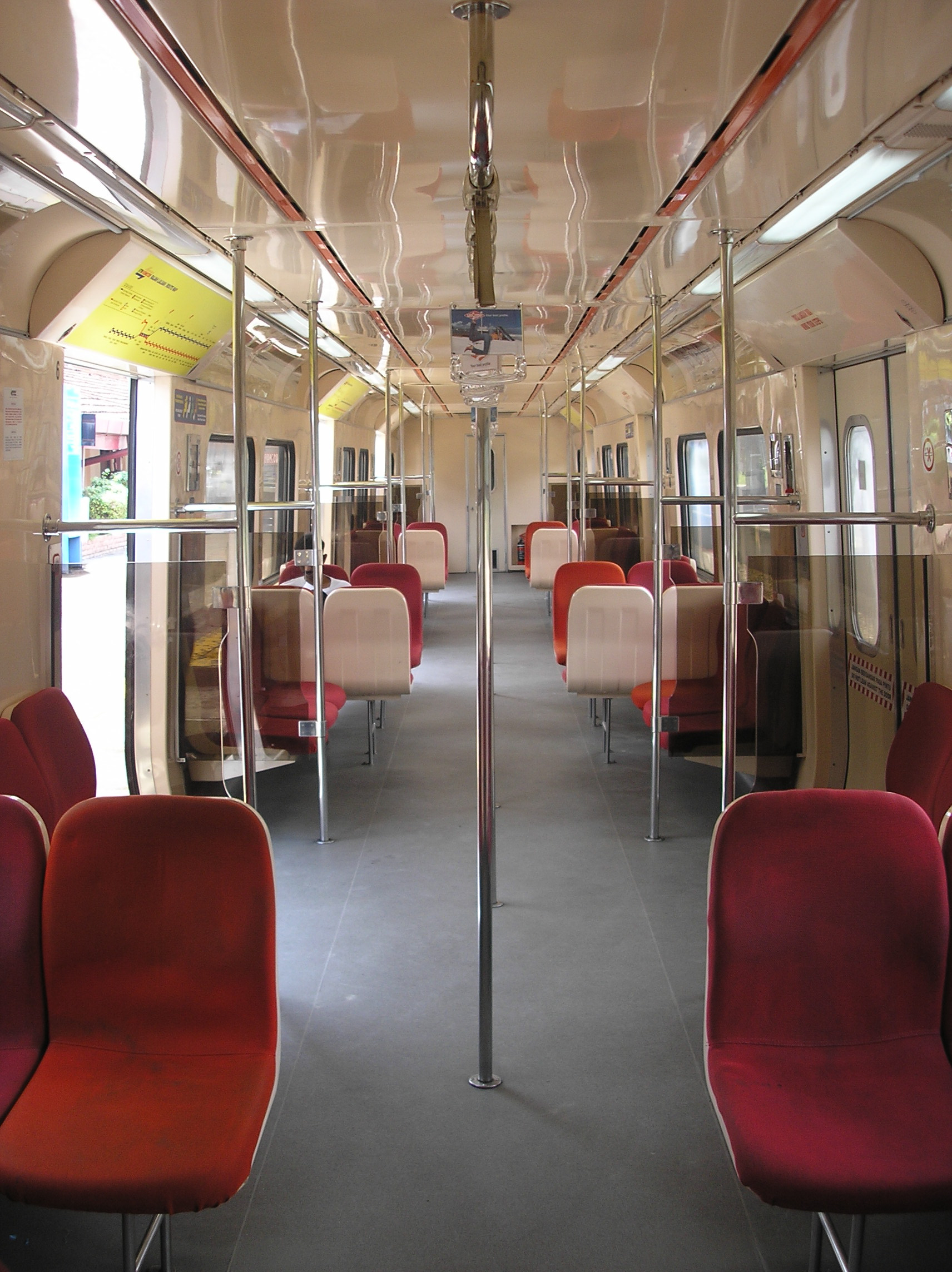
The (modified—with additional handle bars) interior of a Class 83 EMU train

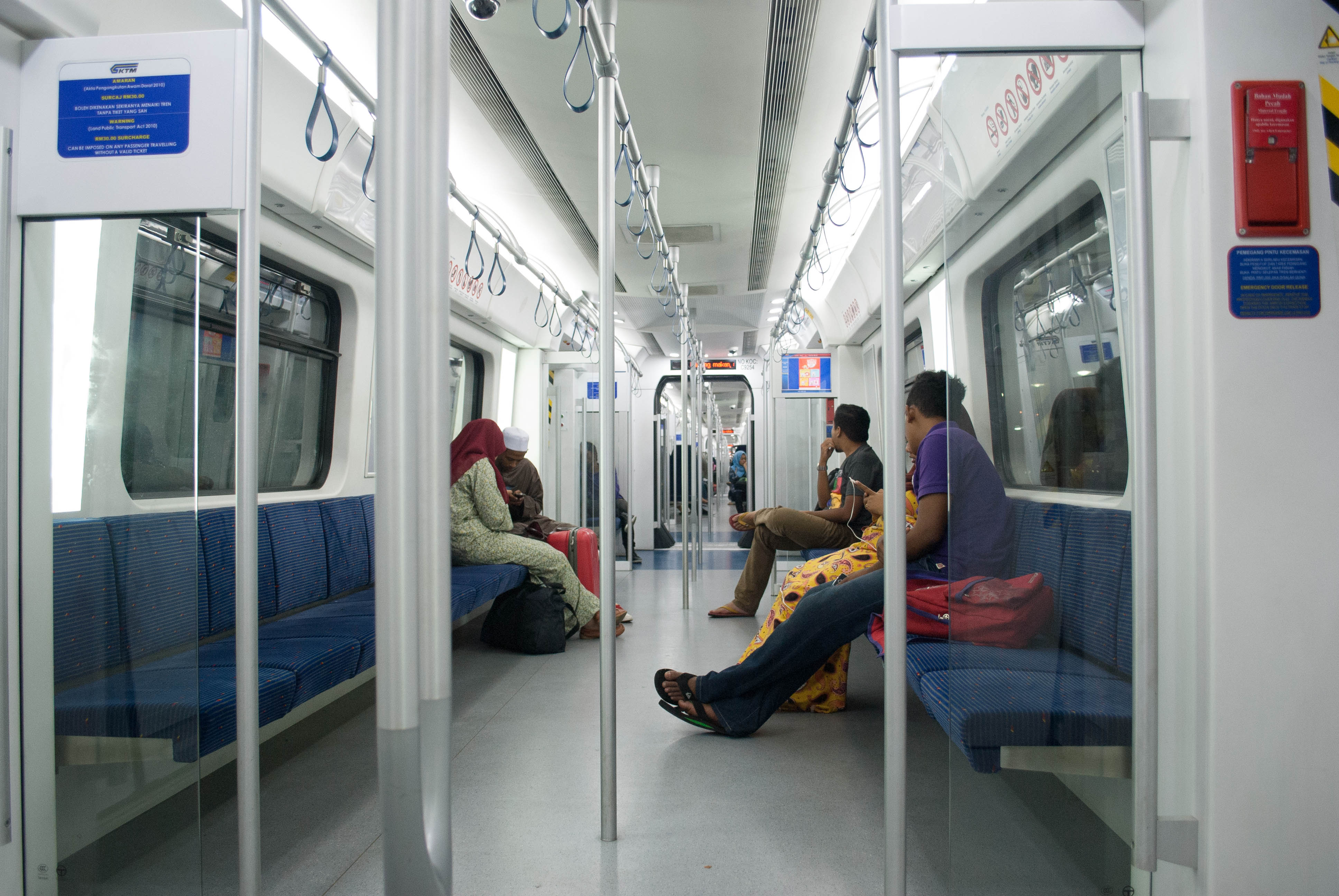
Interior of the KTM Class 92 EMU, end coaches feature longitudinal seating

== See also ==
- Keretapi Tanah Melayu
  - KTM Intercity & KTM ETS
    - KTM West Coast Line
    - KTM East Coast Line
  - KTM Komuter
    - Batu Caves–Pulau Sebang Line
    - KL Sentral–Terminal Skypark Line
    - Northern Sector
    - Southern Sector
- Malaysian Railway System
