= Jalan Kastam Komuter station =

Railway station in Port Klang, Malaysia

Coordinates: 3°0′46″N 101°24′9″E

Jalan Kastam

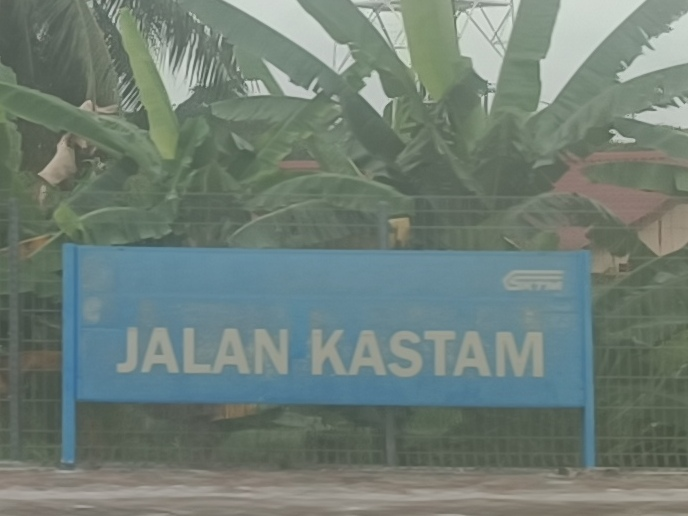

General information
- Other names: Malay: جالن کستم (Jawi); Chinese: 关税路; Tamil: ஜாலான் கஸ்தாம்
- Location: Jalan Kastam, Port Klang; Selangor; Malaysia
- System: KD18 | Commuter rail station
- Operator: Keretapi Tanah Melayu
- Line: Port Klang Branch
- Platforms: 1 side platform; 1 island platform
- Tracks: 2

Construction
- Parking: Available

Other information
- Station code: KD18

History
- Opened: 1995

Services
Preceding station	Keretapi Tanah Melayu (Komuter)	Following station
Kampung Raja Uda towards Tanjung Malim	Tanjung Malim–Port Klang Line	Port Klang Terminus
Future development
Preceding station	Malaysia Rail Link	Following station
Westport Terminus	East Coast Rail Link	KTM Serendah towards Kota Bharu
Location

The Jalan Kastam Komuter station is a commuter train halt located in Port Klang, Selangor and served by the Port Klang Line of the KTM Komuter railway system. It was named as Pelabuhan Klang Pusat at the beginning.

The Jalan Kastam Komuter station was built to cater traffic in suburban area with the similar name called Jalan Kastam, located north-east from South point of Port Klang.

The KTM scrapyard and depot located beside the station is currently used to house old, broken down locomotives that will be sent for scrapping.

Now, the station will also interchange with future MRL East Coast Rail Link Phase 2 and would be the terminal station for passenger service.
