= Klang (city) =

City and royal capital in Selangor, Malaysia

- City, royal capital and district capital
- Royal City of Klang Bandaraya Diraja Klang (Malay)
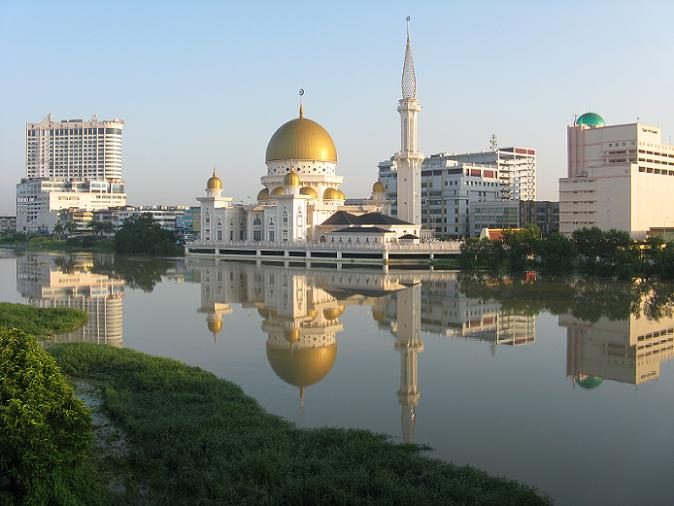
- Klang skyline along the Klang River

- Seal
- Motto(s): Perpaduan Asas Kemakmuran "Unity is the Foundation of Prosperity"
- Area administered by the Klang Royal City Council (red) within Klang District (orange) and Selangor (yellow)

- Location of Klang in Selangor Klang (Malaysia) Klang (Southeast Asia)
- Coordinates: 3°02′N 101°27′E
- Country: Malaysia
- State: Selangor
- District: Klang
- Local government established: May 1890
- Town Board: 1945
- Town Council: 1954
- District Council: 1971
- Municipality status: 1 January 1977
- City status: 23 November 2023
- Proclaimed Royal City: 5 February 2024

Government
  - Type: City council
  - Body: Klang Royal City Council
  - Mayor: Abd Hamid Hussain

Area
  - City, royal capital and district capital: 573 km^{2} (221 sq mi)
- Elevation: 6 m (20 ft)

Population (2010)
  - City, royal capital and district capital: 240,016
  - Density: 1,298/km^{2} (3,360/sq mi)
  - Urban: 744,062
  - Metro: 842,146
- Time zone: UTC+8 (MST)
- Postcode: 41xxx
- Area code: 03
- Vehicle registration: B
- Website: www.mbdk.gov.my

Klang or Kelang, officially the Royal City of Klang (Malay: Bandaraya Diraja Klang), is a city and the royal capital of the state of Selangor, Malaysia. It is the administrative centre of Klang District and lies on the Klang River, approximately 32 kilometres (20 mi) west of central Kuala Lumpur and east of Port Klang.

Klang served at various times as the administrative capital of Selangor before the state capital was ultimately transferred to Shah Alam in 1977. It remains closely associated with the Selangor royal household, whose principal palace, Istana Alam Shah, is located in the city.

The former Klang Municipal Council was granted city status with effect from 23 November 2023. On 5 February 2024, Sultan Sharafuddin Idris Shah formally proclaimed Klang a royal city and the local authority became the Klang Royal City Council (MBDK).

The wider Klang area forms an important industrial, manufacturing and logistics centre within the Klang Valley. Nearby Port Klang, historically developed as the maritime outlet for Selangor, is one of Malaysia's principal container ports.

== Etymology ==
Klang is generally believed to take its name from the Klang River, which flows through the city before reaching the Strait of Malacca at Port Klang. The river and surrounding urban region subsequently gave their name to the wider Klang Valley.

One proposed origin derives the name from the Mon–Khmer word klong, referring to a canal or waterway. Another interpretation has associated it with the Malay word kilang, although its modern meaning is "factory".

The settlement was also historically known as Pengkalan Batu, meaning "stone jetty".

The Chinese name for Klang, Chinese: 巴生, is not a direct transliteration of the present Malay name. It has been suggested that it originated from the Malay word pasang, referring to the tides in the Klang area.

== History ==
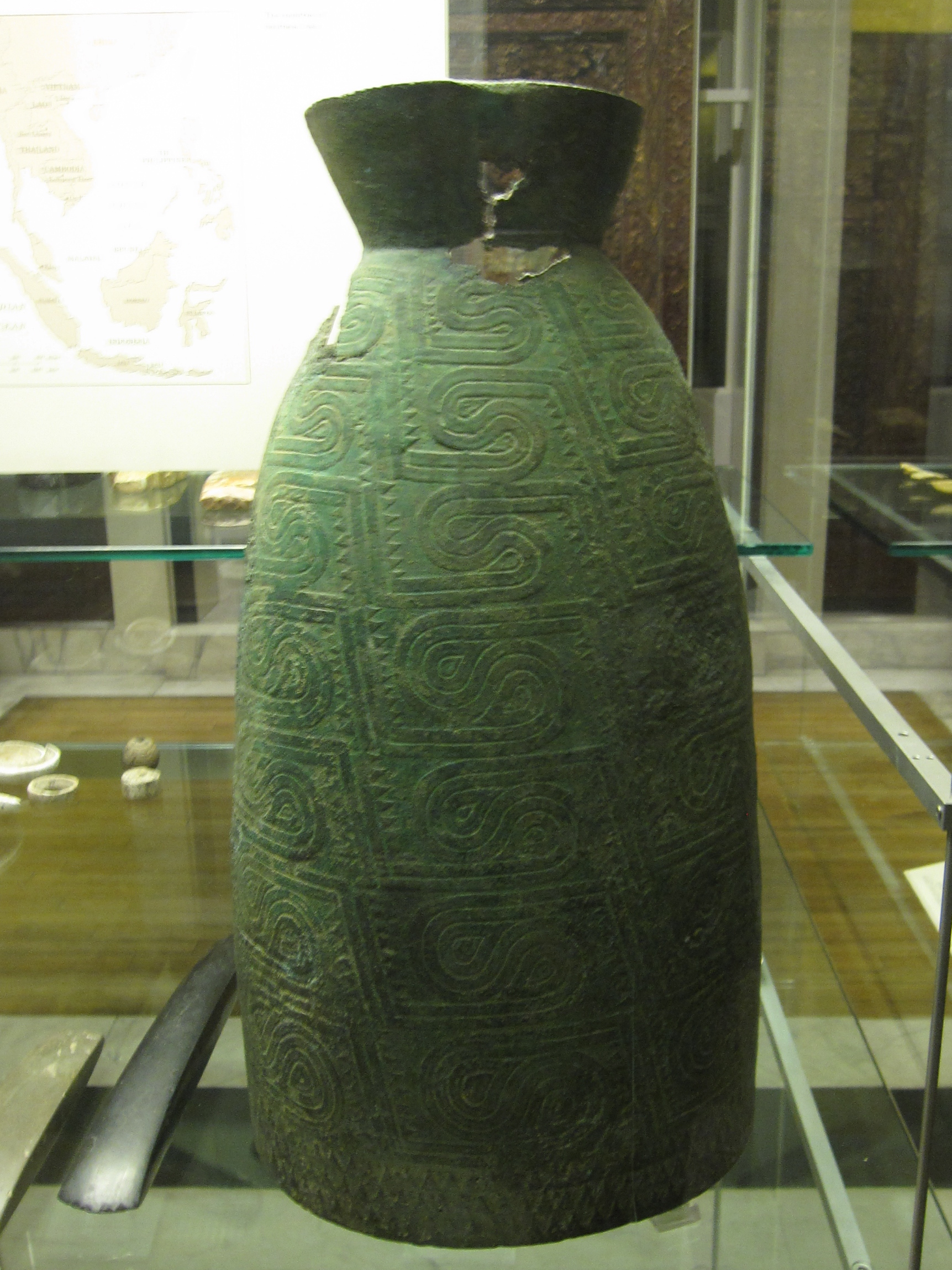
The Klang Bell, dated to approximately 200 BC–AD 200

=== Early history ===
The Klang area has been inhabited since prehistoric times. Archaeological finds from the region include bronze drums, axes and iron implements. The Klang Bell, a bronze bell dated to approximately the 2nd century BC to the 2nd century AD, was discovered in the area and is now held by the British Museum.

Klang's position near the mouth of a river leading into the tin-rich interior gave the settlement strategic importance. The name was recorded in the 14th-century Javanese poem Nagarakretagama, while the Klang River estuary also appeared on maps associated with the voyages of Zheng He.

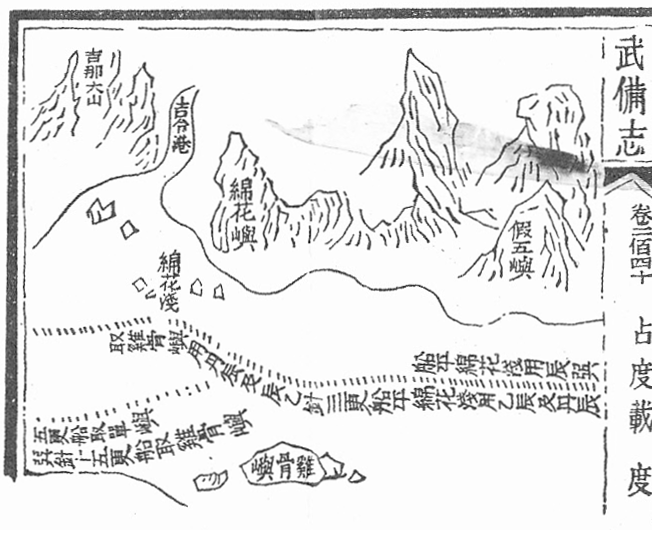
The Klang River estuary (吉令港) on the Mao Kun map

=== Malacca, Johor and Selangor ===
During the 15th century, Klang was under the Malacca Sultanate. Tun Perak, one of Malacca's most prominent Bendahara, was associated with Klang before his appointment to senior office in Malacca.

Following the Portuguese conquest of Malacca in 1511, Klang remained under Malay control and was subsequently associated with the Johor Sultanate. Bugis migration into the western coast of the Malay Peninsula during the 17th and 18th centuries contributed to the formation of the Selangor Sultanate, which came to control Klang.

=== Klang War and colonial period ===
During the 19th century, expanding tin mining in the Klang Valley increased the economic and political importance of Klang. Rivalry over control of the district was a major factor in the Klang War, or Selangor Civil War, between 1867 and 1874.

After Selangor accepted a British Resident in 1874, Klang became the centre of the colonial administration. The administrative capital was moved to Kuala Lumpur in 1880 as the latter grew into the principal tin-mining settlement of the interior.

Klang nevertheless remained Selangor's main outlet for tin until the development of Port Swettenham, now Port Klang, at the river mouth. A railway from Kuala Lumpur reached Bukit Kuda in 1886 and Klang in 1890, strengthening the town's role as a commercial centre.

Local administration began with the Klang Health Board in May 1890. Klang's official local-government boundary was defined in 1895.

The first road bridge connecting both sides of the Klang River, Belfield Bridge, was constructed in 1908.

=== 20th and 21st centuries ===
In 1926, the Klang and Port Swettenham health boards were merged. The authority became Klang Town Board in 1945 and Klang Town Council in 1954. Port Klang, Kapar and Meru were incorporated into the Klang District Council in the 1970s, and the authority was upgraded to Klang Municipal Council on 1 January 1977.

Klang briefly served again as Selangor's state capital from 1974 until Shah Alam formally assumed the role in 1977.

On 26 July 2023, the federal government announced approval for Klang Municipal Council to be upgraded to a city council. The grant of city status received royal consent in November 2023 and took effect on 23 November 2023. On 5 February 2024, Sultan Sharafuddin proclaimed the city the Royal City of Klang, and the local authority adopted the name Klang Royal City Council.

== Geography and urban structure ==
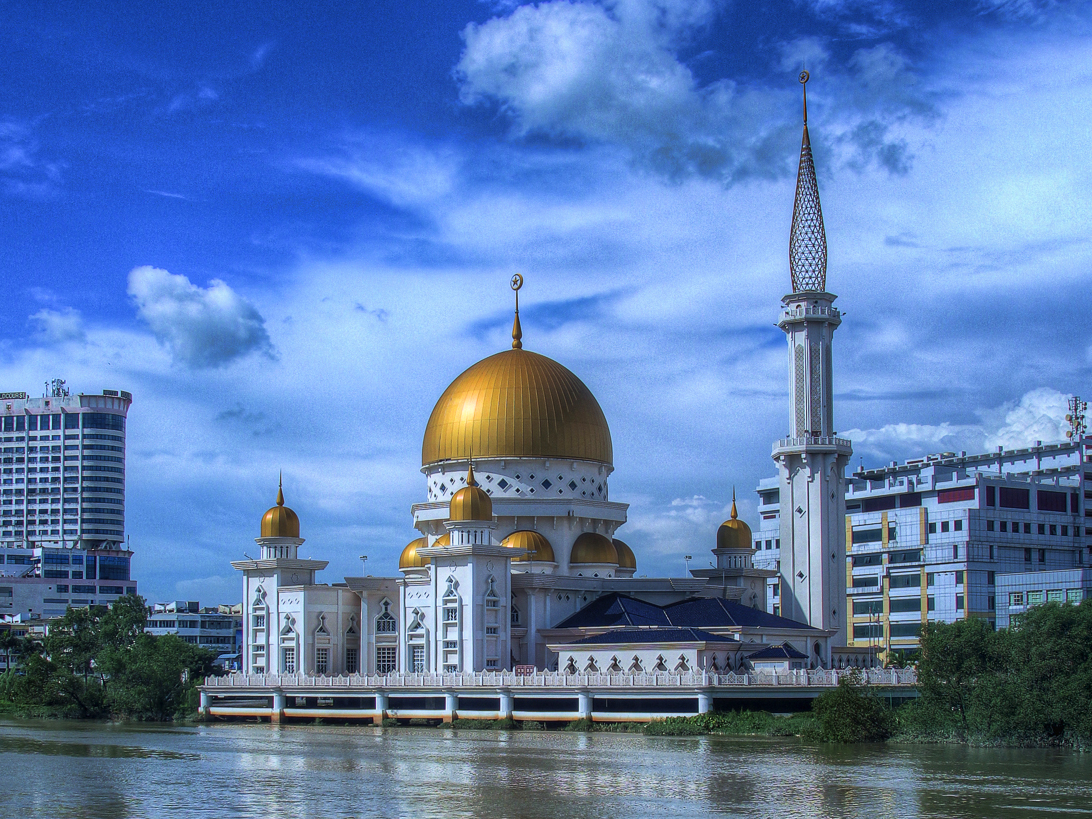
Pasar Jawa Mosque beside the Klang River

The Klang River divides the traditional urban area into North Klang and South Klang. Development has subsequently expanded beyond the old town into a large urbanised area that includes established and newer residential, commercial and industrial townships.

North Klang includes areas such as Bandar Baru Klang, Berkeley Garden, Meru, Rantau Panjang, Klang Utama, Bandar Bukit Raja, Aman Perdana and Klang Sentral. South Klang includes the historic town centre south of the river together with Bandar Bukit Tinggi, Bandar Botanic, Taman Sri Andalas, Taman Sentosa, Bayu Perdana, Kota Bayuemas and surrounding developments.

The Klang Royal City Council administers most of western Klang District, while some eastern areas of the district fall under the jurisdiction of Shah Alam City Council.

== Government ==
Local government is provided by the Klang Royal City Council (MBDK). The council traces its institutional history to the Klang Health Board established in 1890.

City status took effect on 23 November 2023, while the royal-city proclamation was made on 5 February 2024. The council is responsible for areas including planning control, local roads, drainage, public health, waste management, markets, parks, licensing and municipal facilities.

Klang and its surrounding urban area overlap the federal constituencies of Klang, Kapar and Kota Raja.

== Economy ==
Klang developed historically as a trading and industrial settlement serving the agricultural and mining economy of western Selangor. Its location between Kuala Lumpur and Port Klang subsequently helped establish the area as a major manufacturing, warehousing and logistics centre.

Industrial areas are distributed across Bukit Raja, Meru, Kapar, Klang Utama, Pulau Indah, Teluk Gong and other parts of the wider city and district.

The city's economy is closely linked to Port Klang, which developed from the former Port Swettenham and serves as one of Malaysia's principal maritime gateways. Port-related industries in the wider Klang area include container handling, freight forwarding, warehousing, shipping agencies, customs services and manufacturing.

The Port Klang Free Zone, developed on Pulau Indah, was established as a regional logistics, trade and distribution centre.

Klang has also developed a significant retail and services economy, particularly around Bandar Bukit Tinggi, Bandar Baru Klang, Meru and the historic town centre.

=== Tourism ===
Tourism became an increasingly visible component of the local economy following Klang's elevation to royal-city status and the promotion of Visit Selangor Year 2025. Klang recorded 642,557 visitors between January and September 2025, exceeding the 629,218 visitors recorded during the whole of 2024.

Of the January–September 2025 total, 465,315 were domestic visitors and 177,242 were international visitors. China was the largest source of international visitors with 63,655, followed by Singapore with 15,725 and Indonesia with 12,642.

The city's heritage buildings, royal institutions, traditional commercial streets, food culture and Klang Heritage Walk are among its principal tourism attractions.

== Demographics ==
Population figures for "Klang" vary according to whether they refer to the historic town, the local-authority area or the wider Klang District.

The 2010 census recorded 568,707 residents within the then Klang Municipal Council area, while the wider urban population administered by the council was reported separately in earlier municipal statistics.

Klang has substantial Malay, Chinese and Indian communities, reflecting its long history as a trading, port and industrial centre.

Ethnic Group	Population							
Ethnic Group	1957		1970		2010		2020	
Malay	37,003	24.68%	72,734	31.13%	234,293	41.18%		
Other Bumiputras					9,107	1.60%		
Bumiputra total					243,400	42.78%	541,913	49.76%
Chinese	65,454	43.65%	100,524	43.02%	152,582	26.83%	251,530	23.01%
Indian	44,393	29.60%	59,333	25.39%	121,533	21.37%	189,552	17.41%
Others	3,105	2.07%	1,079	0.46%	2,994	0.53%	7,701	0.71%
Malaysian total					520,509	91.53%	990,696	90.98%
Non-Malaysian					98,246	8.47%	98,246	9.02%
Total	149,955	100.00%	233,670	100.00%	568,707	100.00%	1,088,942	100.00%

== Transportation ==
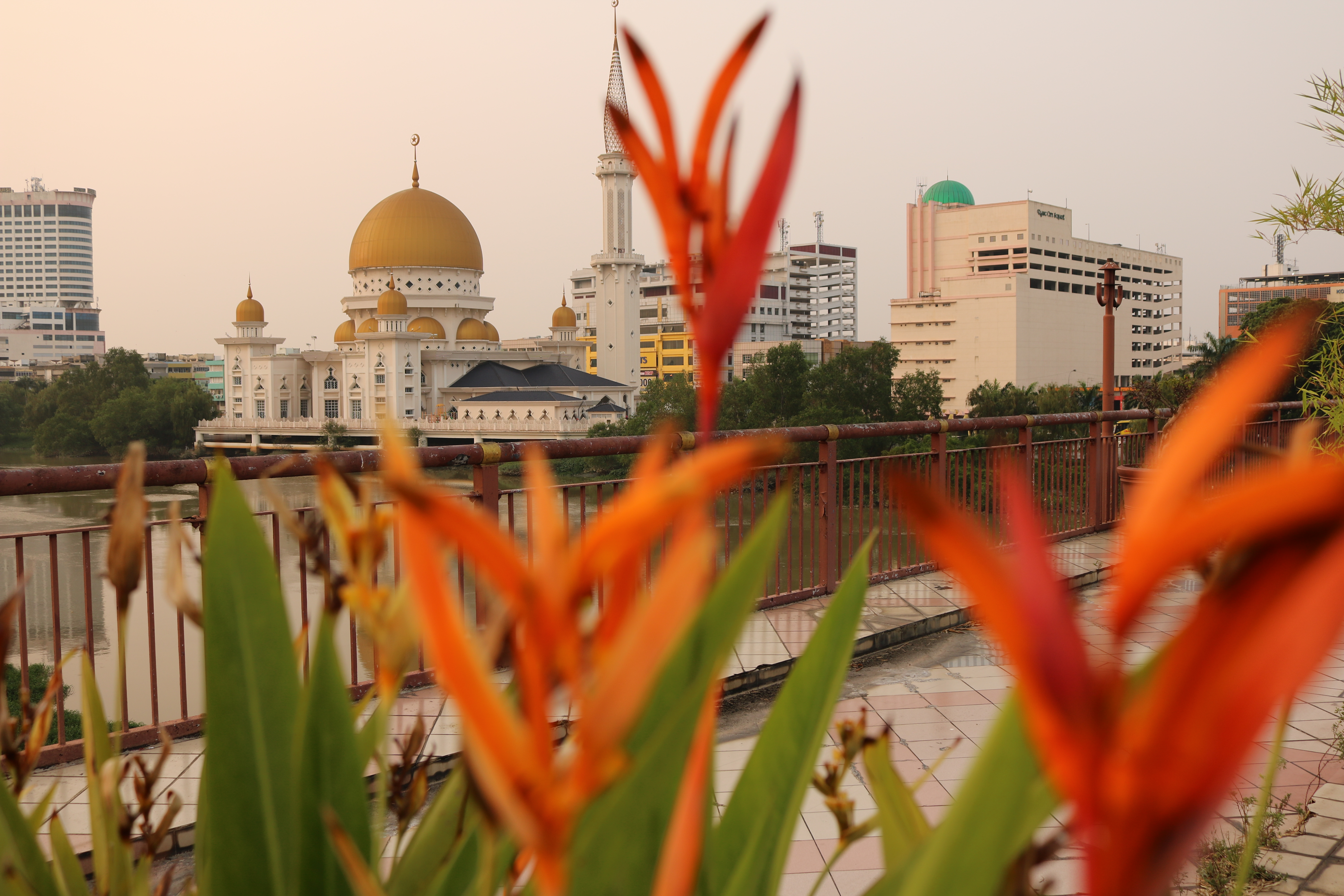
Central Klang and the Kota Bridge

=== Rail ===
Klang is served by the 2 Port Klang Line of the KTM Komuter network. Stations serving the Klang urban area include:

- Bukit Badak
- Kampung Raja Uda
- Klang
- Teluk Pulai
- Teluk Gadong
- Port Klang

The 11 Shah Alam Line, also known as LRT3, began passenger operations on 29 June 2026. The 37.8-kilometre (23.5 mi) line links Bandar Utama with Johan Setia and provides rail service through central Klang.

Stations on the Shah Alam Line in and around Klang include Bandar Baru Klang, Pasar Klang, Jalan Meru, Jambatan Kota, Taman Selatan, Sri Andalas, Klang Jaya, Bandar Bukit Tinggi and Johan Setia.

The line recorded more than 60,000 journeys across its rail and supporting first- and last-mile network on its first day of operation.

=== Roads ===
Klang is linked to the wider Klang Valley by several major highways, including:

- Federal Highway
- New Klang Valley Expressway (NKVE)
- Shah Alam Expressway (KESAS)
- South Klang Valley Expressway (SKVE)
- New North Klang Straits Bypass
- West Coast Expressway (WCE)

The WCE connects the western coastal corridor of Selangor and Perak. The Banting–SKVE section opened on 30 August 2024 and the SKVE–Shah Alam Expressway section opened on 22 January 2025. Other sections remained under construction in 2026.

=== Bridges ===
The Kota Bridge is one of the best-known transport landmarks in central Klang. Its older double-deck structure was constructed between 1957 and 1960 and opened in 1961. The lower deck remains available to pedestrians, bicycles and motorcycles.

The Musaeddin Bridge, also known as Tengku Kelana Bridge, was later built near the Kota Bridge. The Klang Third Bridge, costing approximately RM199 million, opened in May 2017 and provides another road connection between North and South Klang.

=== Bus services ===
Klang is served by Rapid KL and other stage-bus services, while Klang Sentral functions as a bus and taxi terminal in northern Klang.

The Smart Selangor Bus programme also operates within the city. In 2025, MBDK's network consisted of 7 routes served by 10 buses. By 11 December 2025, the service had carried 297,446 passengers.

The service is subsidised for eligible local users. Foreign passengers were charged RM0.90 per trip in 2025, and 14,540 foreign nationals had used the service by 11 December.

As of 2026, scheduled bus services in Klang are operated by Rapid KL, Smart Selangor, Wawasan Sutera and Causeway Link. Following the opening of the Shah Alam Line in June 2026, Rapid KL also introduced feeder bus routes connecting several LRT stations in Klang with surrounding residential and commercial areas.

Bus routes serving Klang
Route	Route / destination	Operator	Service type
Stage and trunk bus services
704	Meru ⇌ Klang	Wawasan Sutera	Stage bus
707	Klang ⇌ Westport	Wawasan Sutera	Stage bus
710	Klang ⇌ Pasar Seni	Wawasan Sutera	Express / trunk bus
730	Banting ⇌ Klang	Wawasan Sutera	Stage bus
734	Banting ⇌ Pasar Seni	Wawasan Sutera	Through service via Klang
740	Klang ⇌ Kuala Selangor	Wawasan Sutera	Stage bus
T703	Klang Utara ⇌ Taman Sri Sentosa / Taman Sentosa	Wawasan Sutera	Local bus
P701	Port Klang ⇌ Kota Raya / Central Market, Kuala Lumpur	Causeway Link	Intercity trunk bus
Smart Selangor Bus services
KLG1	Bandar Klang ↺ LRT Seri Andalas	Smart Selangor (MBDK)	Free municipal bus
KLG2A	Bandar Klang ↺ Taman Sri Pekan via Taman Eng Ann	Smart Selangor (MBDK)	Free municipal bus
KLG2B	Bandar Klang ↺ LRT Bandar Baru Klang via Taman Intan and AEON Bukit Raja	Smart Selangor (MBDK)	Free municipal bus
KLG3A	Taman Rakyat ↺ Bandar Klang	Smart Selangor (MBDK)	Free municipal bus
KLG3B	Bandar Putera ↺ Bandar Klang via Jalan Raja Nong	Smart Selangor (MBDK)	Free municipal bus
KLG3C	Bandar Putera ⇌ Bandar Klang via Jalan Kebun	Smart Selangor (MBDK)	Free municipal bus
KLG4	Klang Sentral ↺ Taman Seri Kerayong via Meru and Kapar	Smart Selangor (MBDK)	Free municipal bus
Shah Alam Line feeder buses
T719	LRT Klang Jaya ↺ Taman Kota Pendamar	Rapid KL	LRT feeder bus
T721	LRT Taman Selatan ↺ Pandamaran	Rapid KL	LRT feeder bus
T722	LRT Jambatan Kota ↺ Kampung Sungai Kandis	Rapid KL	LRT feeder bus
T725	LRT Jambatan Kota ↺ Kampung Sungai Udang	Rapid KL	LRT feeder bus
T728	LRT Pasar Klang ↺ Setia City Mall	Rapid KL	LRT feeder bus
T729	LRT Pasar Klang ↺ Bandar Bukit Raja	Rapid KL	LRT feeder bus

== Shopping ==
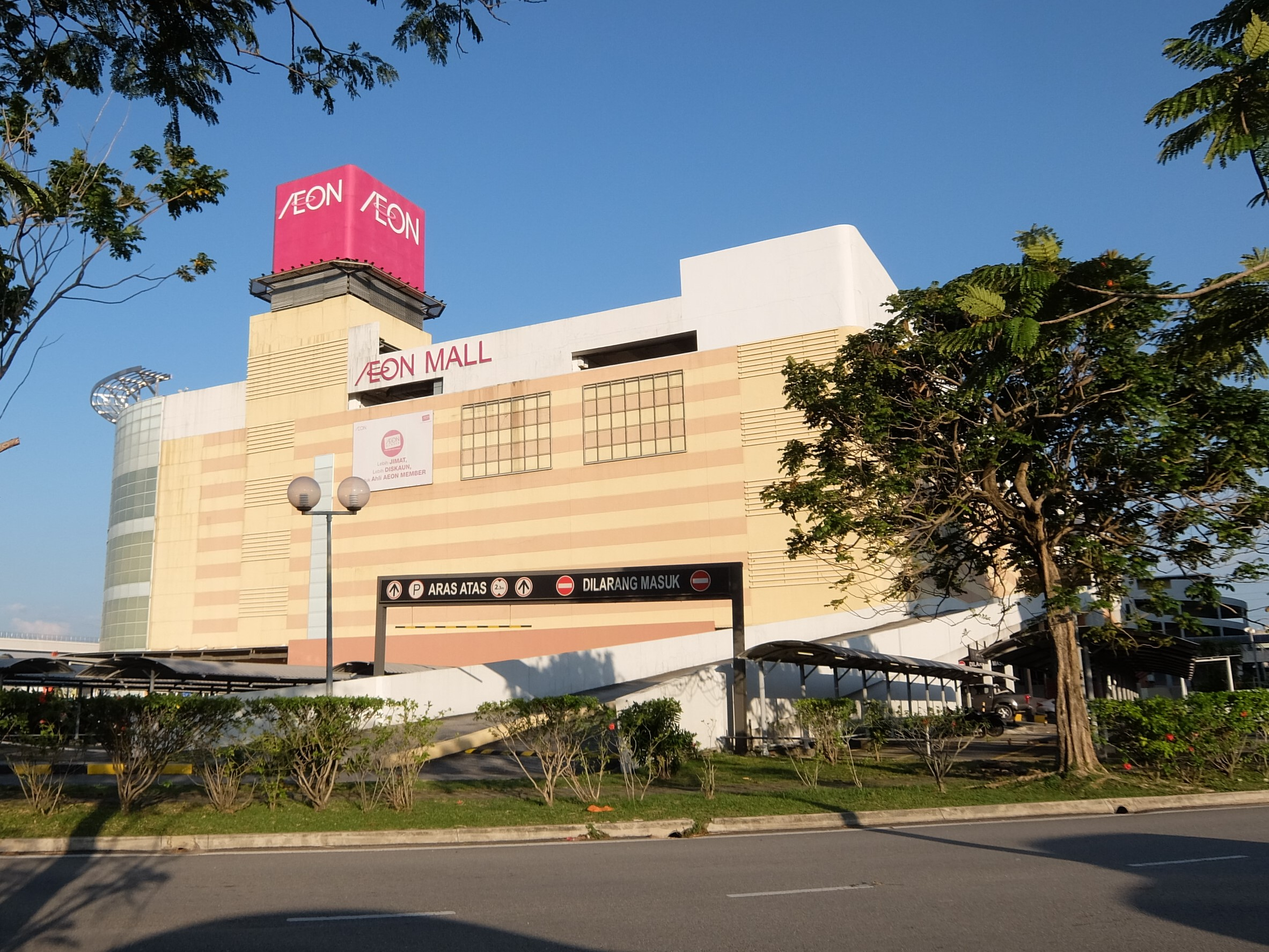
AEON Bukit Tinggi Shopping Centre

Major shopping centres and retail areas in Klang include:

- AEON Bukit Tinggi Shopping Centre, Bandar Bukit Tinggi
- AEON Bukit Raja, Bandar Baru Klang
- Centro Mall
- GM Klang Wholesale City, Bandar Botanic
- Klang Parade, Jalan Meru
- KSL Esplanade Mall, Bandar Bestari
- Lotus's Klang, Bandar Bukit Tinggi
- NSK Trade City
- Mydin Klang
- retail districts in the historic town centre and Little India.

== Health ==
The principal public hospital serving Klang is Hospital Tengku Ampuan Rahimah, commonly known as Klang General Hospital.

Other government healthcare facilities include health clinics at Bandar Botanic, Bukit Kuda, Bukit Naga, Kapar, Meru, Pandamaran, Port Klang, Pulau Indah, Pulau Ketam and Rantau Panjang.

Private medical facilities in the Klang area include:

- Bukit Tinggi Medical Centre
- Columbia Asia Hospital Klang
- KPJ Klang Specialist Hospital
- Pantai Hospital Klang
- Sri Kota Specialist Medical Centre
- Sentosa Specialist Hospital Klang

== Education ==
Klang has a large network of government, vernacular, religious, private and international schools.

Among its better-known secondary schools are:

- Klang High School
- Anglo Chinese School, Klang
- La Salle School, Klang
- SMJK Kwang Hua, Klang
- SMJK Chung Hwa
- Sultan Alam Shah Islamic College
- SMK Tengku Ampuan Rahimah
- SMK Raja Mahadi
- SMK Tengku Idris Shah

Chinese independent secondary schools include:

- Hin Hua High School
- Chung Hua Independent High School
- Kwang Hua Private High School
- Pin Hwa High School

Private and international institutions operating in Klang include Acmar International School, Beaconhouse Sri Lethia, Regent International School, Sri KDU International School Klang and Wesley Methodist School.

Post-secondary institutions include Klang Community College and several private colleges.

== Culture and tourism ==
=== Heritage and royal city ===
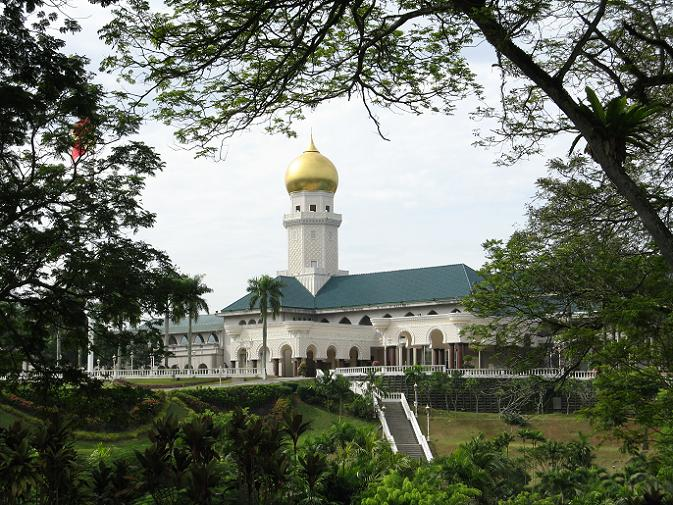
Istana Alam Shah

Klang's historic centre contains a concentration of royal, religious, civic and commercial buildings associated with the development of Selangor.

The city's heritage tourism received additional attention after Klang was formally proclaimed a royal city in 2024. During Visit Selangor Year 2025, MBDK promoted its heritage trail, food culture and royal-city identity as part of efforts to increase tourism.

=== Landmarks ===
Major landmarks include:

Istana Alam Shah

The official palace of the Sultan of Selangor in Klang. The present palace was built in the mid-20th century to replace the former Mahkota Puri Palace.

Sultan Sulaiman Royal Mosque

The royal mosque of Selangor in Klang. Completed in 1932, its architecture combines Moorish, Art Deco and classical influences.

Sultan Abdul Aziz Royal Gallery

A royal museum housed in the former Sultan Suleiman Building. Its collections document the life and reign of Sultan Salahuddin Abdul Aziz Shah.

Kota Raja Mahadi

The surviving gateway associated with Raja Mahadi's fort and the 19th-century Klang War.

Kota Bridge

A historic double-deck bridge spanning the Klang River and one of the most recognisable structures in central Klang.

Klang South Fire and Rescue Station

A historic fire-station building in the old town. A small heritage gallery has also operated within the station.

Little India

The commercial district around Jalan Tengku Kelana is known for Indian textile, jewellery, food and religious businesses and becomes especially active during Deepavali.

Kuan Im Teng

A Chinese temple founded in 1892 and dedicated to Guanyin.

Church of Our Lady of Lourdes

A Catholic church completed in 1928 and designed with Gothic architectural influences.

Sri Sunderaraja Perumal Temple

A major Vaishnavite Hindu temple founded in Klang in 1896.

Tanjung Harapan

A waterfront recreation and seafood area facing the Strait of Malacca near Port Klang.

=== Tourism growth ===
Visitor numbers rose during 2025. MBDK reported 642,557 visitors between January and September, already exceeding the city's total for the whole of 2024. The increase was associated with Visit Selangor Year 2025, Klang's royal-city status, its heritage trail and stronger international visitor arrivals.

== Cuisine ==
=== Bak kut teh ===
Klang is particularly associated with bak kut teh (Chinese: 肉骨茶; Pe̍h-ōe-jī: Bah-kut-tê), a pork-based herbal soup widely regarded as one of the city's signature dishes.

Long-established concentrations of bak kut teh restaurants can be found in the old town, Teluk Pulai, Taman Intan, Pandamaran and other parts of Klang.

=== Other food ===
Klang's multi-ethnic population has produced a varied local food culture. Chinese hawker dishes, Indian food centred on Little India, Malay cuisine and seafood from the Port Klang coastal area are widely available.

Seafood restaurants are concentrated around Tanjung Harapan, Teluk Gong, Pandamaran and the fishing settlements and islands near Port Klang, including Pulau Ketam.

== Environment and urban development ==
=== Klang River rehabilitation ===
The condition of the Klang River has long influenced planning and environmental policy in the city. Rehabilitation projects have included river cleaning, landscape improvements and redevelopment of selected riverfront areas.

The Selangor Maritime Gateway programme proposed a series of environmental and urban-regeneration projects along the river, including public parks, mangrove areas and riverfront development.

=== Waste management and recycling ===
MBDK expanded its waste-reduction and recycling programmes in 2025. Between January and April, the council's Environmental Services Department collected an estimated 524 tonnes of plastic waste for recycling.

In July 2025, The Ocean Cleanup, Landasan Lumayan Sdn Bhd, J&K Wonderland Foundation and Coca-Cola Malaysia opened a waste-sorting facility along the Klang River. The facility separates recyclable materials recovered from the river.

MBDK also expanded surveillance of illegal-dumping hotspots. During the first quarter of 2025, 100 additional closed-circuit television cameras were added to an existing network of 407 cameras.

=== Flood mitigation ===
Flooding is a recurrent urban-management issue in parts of Klang.

In December 2025, MBDK announced preparation of a comprehensive flood-prevention framework intended to coordinate future flood-mitigation projects across the city. Proposed interventions included drainage upgrades, retention ponds, pump installations and river-cleaning programmes under the Cintai Sungai Klang initiative.

In 2025, RM27.5 million was allocated for 18 high-priority drainage projects intended to address recurring flood problems in the city.

=== Parks and biophilic design ===
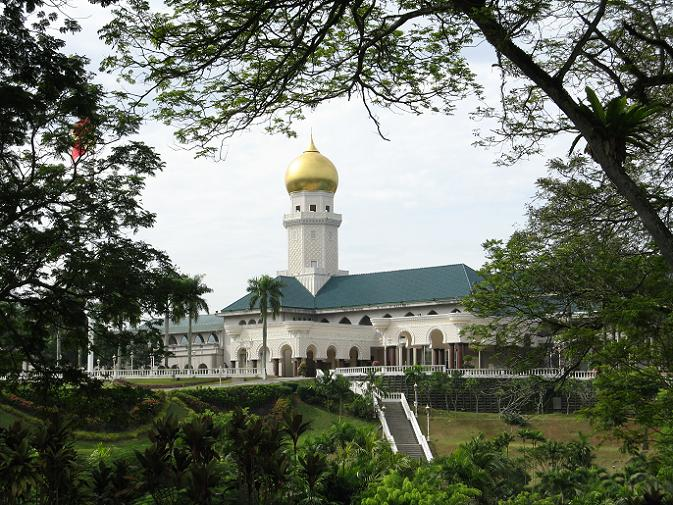
The royal-city precinct includes public open spaces around Istana Alam Shah

In 2025, MBDK redeveloped Taman Bandar Diraja Klang as a biophilic garden with an allocation of RM800,000. The project was intended to introduce nature-based elements into the urban environment and improve resilience to climate and population pressures.

The council's planners, landscape architects and engineers also proposed improving a 4.5-hectare (11-acre) elevated site between Jalan Tengku Kelana and Jalan Istana as a more pedestrian- and community-oriented public space.

MBDK received a Sustainable City Award under the Malaysian Urban-Rural National Indicators Network for Sustainable Development (MURNInets) at Selangor's World Town Planning Day celebration in November 2025.

== Climate ==
Klang has a tropical rainforest climate with high temperatures, humidity and substantial rainfall throughout the year.

Climate data for Klang
Month	Jan	Feb	Mar	Apr	May	Jun	Jul	Aug	Sep	Oct	Nov	Dec	Year
Mean daily maximum °C (°F)	31.0 (87.8)	31.7 (89.1)	32.3 (90.1)	32.0 (89.6)	31.9 (89.4)	31.8 (89.2)	31.4 (88.5)	31.3 (88.3)	31.2 (88.2)	31.1 (88.0)	30.8 (87.4)	30.7 (87.3)	31.4 (88.6)
Daily mean °C (°F)	26.3 (79.3)	26.7 (80.1)	27.2 (81.0)	27.3 (81.1)	27.4 (81.3)	27.3 (81.1)	26.8 (80.2)	26.7 (80.1)	26.8 (80.2)	26.7 (80.1)	26.5 (79.7)	26.3 (79.3)	26.8 (80.3)
Mean daily minimum °C (°F)	21.6 (70.9)	21.7 (71.1)	22.1 (71.8)	22.7 (72.9)	23.0 (73.4)	22.8 (73.0)	22.3 (72.1)	22.2 (72.0)	22.4 (72.3)	22.4 (72.3)	22.3 (72.1)	22.0 (71.6)	22.3 (72.1)
Average rainfall mm (inches)	179 (7.0)	139 (5.5)	207 (8.1)	222 (8.7)	173 (6.8)	108 (4.3)	107 (4.2)	150 (5.9)	179 (7.0)	246 (9.7)	265 (10.4)	233 (9.2)	2,208 (86.8)
Source: Climate-Data.org

== Notable people ==
- Guy Sebastian, Malaysian-born Australian singer-songwriter
- Tin Song Sheng, child whose 1996 disappearance became a widely reported Malaysian missing-person case

== Sister cities ==
Klang has established sister-city or friendship-city relationships with:

- Ürümqi, Xinjiang, China
- Yongzhou, Hunan, China
- Depok, West Java, Indonesia

== See also ==
- Klang District
- Klang River
- Klang Valley
- Port Klang
- Klang Royal City Council
- Klang War
- List of cities in Malaysia
- Selangor

Preceded by first	Capital of Selangor (1875–1880)	Succeeded by Kuala Lumpur

Preceded by Kuala Lumpur	Capital of Selangor (1974–1977)	Succeeded by Shah Alam
