= Jambatan Kota LRT station =

Metro station in Selangor, Malaysia

SA20 Jambatan Kota
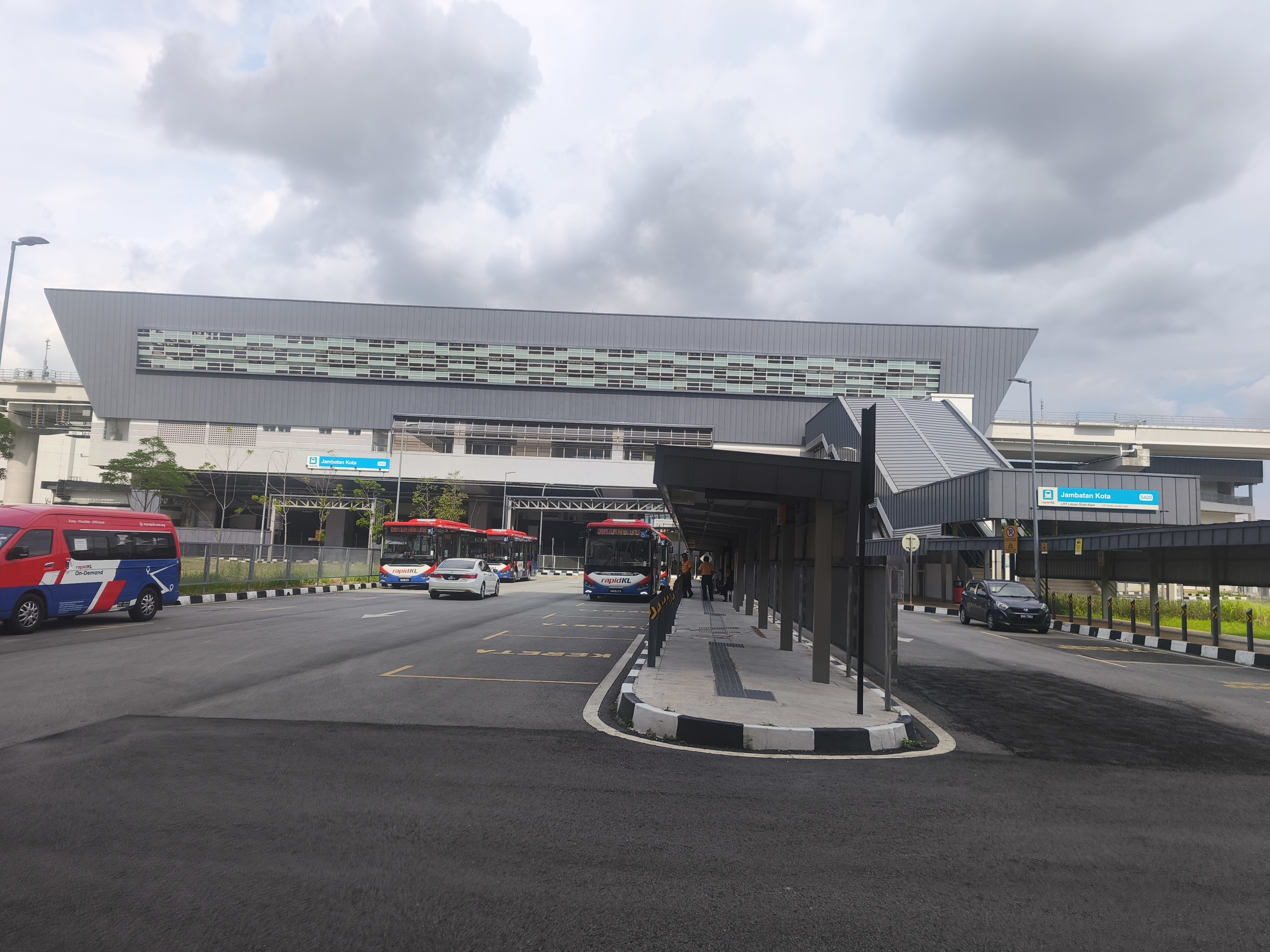

General information
- Other names: Malay: جمبتن کوتا (Jawi); Chinese: 哥打桥; Tamil: கோத்தா பாலம்
- Location: Klang; Selangor; Malaysia
- System: Rapid KL
- Owner: Prasarana Malaysia
- Operator: Rapid Rail
- Line: 11 Shah Alam Line
- Platforms: 2 side platforms
- Tracks: 2

Construction
- Structure type: Elevated
- Parking: Not available
- Accessible: Yes

Other information
- Station code: SA20

History
- Opened: 29 June 2026; 4 months ago
- Former names: Pasar Jawa

Services
Preceding station		Following station
Jalan Meru towards Bandar Utama	Shah Alam Line	Taman Selatan towards Johan Setia
Location

Jambatan Kota LRT station, formerly Pasar Jawa LRT station is an elevated light rapid transit (LRT) station and serves as one of the stations for the Shah Alam line. The station is located in the city of Klang, Selangor one of the world's major international port cities and the global transshipment hub of Malaysia. The station is surrounded by most of the major landmarks in the area, which are the business and commercial districts of north Klang as compared to south Klang, which is mostly government departments. This station mainly serves urban localities that use the Federal Highway, Jalan Meru, Jalan Kapar, and Jalan Langat, which are the four major roads servicing the area.

The area surrounding the LRT station draws tourist attention because it serves as the historic heart of Klang, anchored by the Kota Bridge (after which the station is named), Malaysia’s first double-decker bridge. Visitors are attracted to its unique architecture and the upper deck, which offers scenic river views and a vibrant space for photography and community events. The station sits adjacent to the modern Klang Royal City Council building and the historic Kota Raja Mahadi Fort, overlooking the scenic Klang River view and the lush Pangkalan Batu Urban Park. The station is located near various shopping destinations such as the Pasar Jawa Traditional Market and Shaw Centre Point, and is within walking distance to other attractions in south Klang, such as Little India, the Sultan Abdul Aziz Royal Gallery, the Sultan Sulaiman Mosque and the Royal Klang Heritage walk.

The station is an elevated rapid transit station forming part of the Klang Valley Integrated Transit System. Although not designated as an official interchange, commuters may walk up to the Klang Komuter station on the Tanjung Malim–Port Klang Line from the LRT station, taking approximately 5 to 10 minutes. The KTM line leads to Port Klang, the first port of ancient and medieval Klang, whose initial purpose was to transport tin ore from tin miners. It is now the largest port in the country, having been nicknamed the "National Load Centre".

== History & Initial Planning ==
This is the twentieth station along the line, with the line's maintenance depot located in Johan Setia, Klang. It has facilities such as kiosks, restrooms, elevators, taxi stands, and feeder buses.

During its construction, this station was known as Pasar Jawa.

The station was initially planned to be built near to and to be an interchange with the current Klang Komuter station at south Klang near to Jalan Tengku Kelana, Little India. The LRT station was initially also called Klang LRT station. However, since the planned location was in a busy district, residents opposed the location mainly for historical importance since it required demolishing parts of pre-war shoplots and some other businesses along the narrow roads. The location of the station was then changed to a new location in north Klang near to Jalan Pasar where the major business district in Klang is located. The new location is next to Klang infamous Emporium Makan, which due to construction difficulties, necessitated the building to be demolished in order for the station to be built. The LRT station at the new location was initially given the name Pasar Jawa, and no longer designated as an interchange or connection with the Komuter station. The stations however, are within 700 metres walking distance via Jambatan Musaeddin. In June 2026, the station was renamed to Jambatan Kota.

== Station features ==
Like all the other stations on the Shah Alam line, this is an elevated station. There are three floors, with two side platforms on the second floor, the concourse on the first floor, and two entrances/exits on the ground floor. There are also facilities designed for the disabled, including tactile floor blocks, disabled toilets, braille on elevator buttons, and low-height elevator buttons and customer service centre counters for wheelchair users.

=== Station layout ===
L2
Platform

Level

Side platform, doors will open on the left
→ Platform 1: 11 Shah Alam Line towards SA01 Bandar Utama (Jalan Meru)
← Platform 2: 11 Shah Alam Line towards SA26 Johan Setia (Taman Selatan)
Side platform, doors will open on the left
L1
Concourse
Faregates to paid area, escalators, lifts, ticketing machines, kiosks, customer service counter
G
Ground Level
Feeder Bus Stop, Taxi Lay-By

=== Exits and entrances ===
Jambatan Kota station has a total of 2 entrances. Entrance A leads to Jalan Raja Hassan and the Klang Bus Hub close to Plaza MPK. Entrance B leads to the Kota Bridge, Pasar Jawa, and the Klang Royal City Council.

Shah Alam Line station
Entrance	Location	Destination	Picture
A	Jalan Raja Hassan	Feeder bus stop, taxi and private vehicle lay-by Perhentian Teksi Klang; Pasar Jawa; Masjid Bandar Diraja Klang Plaza MPK; Klang Bus Hub	
B	Jambatan Kota	Pasar Jawa Masjid Bandar Diraja Klang Kota Raja Mahadi; Klang Royal City Council	

== Surrounding Area ==
The station is located along Jalan Pasar and Jalan Raja Hassan, and is parallel to its namesake, the Kota Bridge, which connects the north and south of Klang over the Klang River, and is part of Federal Routes 2 and 5. The station serves Kawasan 1 Klang, Kawasan 6 Klang, Kampung Attap, Kampung Kuantan, Taman Bukit Kuda, Taman Kampung Kuantan, Taman Seng Chai, Kampung Bukit Kuda, Kampung Sungai Bertek, Kampung Sungai Pinang and the Klang city centre. Major landmarks around the station include:

- Plaza MPK (Mydin Klang Utara)
- Hentian Bas Klang
- Masjid Diraja Klang
- Kolej Hafiz
- Arked Mara
- Klang City Square
- Klang Digital Mall
- Aliya Hotel
- GOCOS Hotel
- First Tower (LHDN Klang)
- Hospital Wanita IVF Metro
- Klang Commercial Convention Center (KCCC)
- KO Skin Specialist
- Confort Hotel
- B Hotel
- Family Hotel
- GFG Tower Co-Working
- Klang High School
- Pin Hwa High School
- Sri KDU International School
- Berkeley Uptown Residence
- Kg Bukit Kuda
- Pasar Jawa

== Bus Services ==
=== Feeder buses ===
	Origin	Destination	Via	Connecting to	Notes
T722	SA20 Jambatan Kota	KD14 Klang Komuter station ST Rosyam Mall; Kampung Sungai Kandis	Jalan Raya Timur; Jalan Kebun; Persiaran Nagasari		
T725	SA20 Jambatan Kota	Kampung Sungai Udang	Jalan Tepi Sungai; Jalan Sungai Bertih; Teluk Pulai		

There are two feeder bus routes available serving from this station: T722 serving KTM Klang, Taman Bijaya and ST Rosyam Mall Jalan Kebun. T725 serving Kampung Sungai Udang.

Nearby the station is the Klang Bus Hub near Plaza MPK, which houses city bus routes operated by Wawasan Sutera (routes 710 (to Kuala Lumpur), 704 (to Meru), 707 (to West Port), 730 (to Banting), and 740 (to Kapar & Kuala Selangor)) and Causeway Link (route P701 to Port Klang).

In addition, Rapid On-Demand (ROD) demand-responsive transit services are also available, serving Taman Summit and Taman Batu Belah.
