= Port Klang Komuter station =

Railway station in Port Klang, Malaysia

Coordinates: 2°59′57″N 101°23′30″E

Pelabuhan Klang

General information
- Other names: Malay: ڤلابوهن کلڠ (Jawi); Chinese: 巴生港口; Tamil: கிள்ளான் துறைமுகம்
- Location: Port Klang, Selangor, Malaysia.
- System: KD19 | Commuter rail station
- Owner: Keretapi Tanah Melayu
- Line: Port Klang Branch
- Platforms: 1 side platform; 1 island platform
- Tracks: 3

Construction
- Parking: Not available in close proximity of the station, but ample parking space is available outside of the station
- Cycle facilities: No

Other information
- Station code: KD19

History
- Opened: 1899
- Rebuilt: 1995

Services
Preceding station	Keretapi Tanah Melayu (Komuter)	Following station
Jalan Kastam towards Tanjung Malim	Tanjung Malim–Port Klang Line	Terminus
Location

The Port Klang Komuter station (Malay: Stesen Komuter Pelabuhan Klang) is a train station in Port Klang, Selangor, Malaysia, operated by KTM Komuter. It is the western terminus, and name sake, of the Port Klang Line.

This station is within walking distance of the South Port cruise ship terminal, Port Klang Immigration Centre, and the Pulau Ketam ferry terminal.

Many primary and secondary schools are located in the proximity, and because of that, this station can get packed during the mornings and evenings.

The station is connected to an 11.2 km single line track which terminates at Westport. The railway track – which uses block trains to carry logistics – began operations on 9 December 1998.
