= Rasa Komuter station =

Railway station in Rasa, Malaysia

Coordinates: 3°30′00″N 101°38′03″E

Rasa

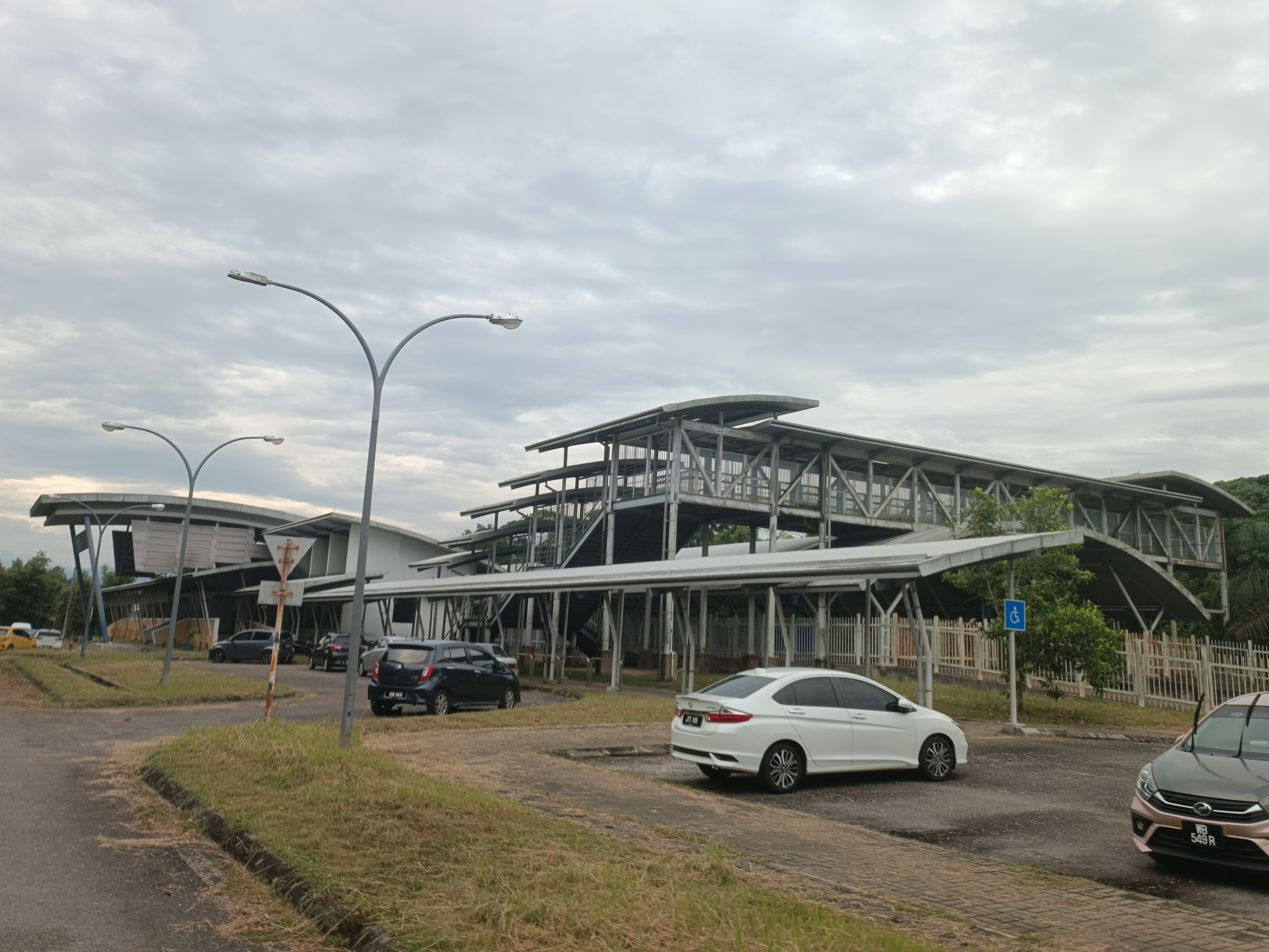
- The overall view of the Rasa station.

General information
- Other names: Malay: راس (Jawi); Chinese: 叻思; Tamil: ராசா
- Location: Rasa, Hulu Selangor, Selangor, Malaysia.
- System: KA13 | Commuter rail station
- Owner: Keretapi Tanah Melayu
- Line: West Coast Line
- Platforms: 2 side platforms.
- Tracks: 2

Construction
- Parking: Available, free.
- Accessible: Y

Other information
- Station code: KA13

History
- Opened: 21 April 2007
- Electrified: 21 April 2007

Services
Preceding station	Keretapi Tanah Melayu (Komuter)	Following station
Kuala Kubu Bharu towards Tanjung Malim	Tanjung Malim–Port Klang Line	Batang Kali towards Port Klang
Location

The Rasa Komuter station is a Malaysian commuter rail train station located at the northern side of and named after the town of Rasa, Hulu Selangor, Selangor. The station was opened on 21 April 2007, alongside Batang Kali and Serendah stations. It was the third stop on KTM Komuter's Rawang–Tanjung Malim shuttle service (formerly known as the Rawang–Kuala Kubu Bharu shuttle service) until direct services to Port Klang were introduced in 2016, as part of the Tanjung Malim–Port Klang Line.

The station, as are all the other stations along the shuttle route (except Tanjung Malim), is situated along two tracks with two platforms like most station halts along the KTM Komuter netwokr, but contains facilities normally reserved for medium-to-large stations with three or more tracks. In addition to ticketing facilities and basic amenities, the station contains spaces for administrative occupants, as well as a kiosk and an additional footbridge (fused with a footbridge exclusively for Komuter users) for pedestrians that simply intend to cross the railway lines. The station also includes low-tech support for disabled passengers. The station exits southwest towards a branch road that leads into the town centre of Rasa.

The station's two side platforms are designated as Platform 1 (adjoining the main station building at the west, intended for northbound trains) and Platform 2 (at the east, intended for southbound trains).

== Gallery ==
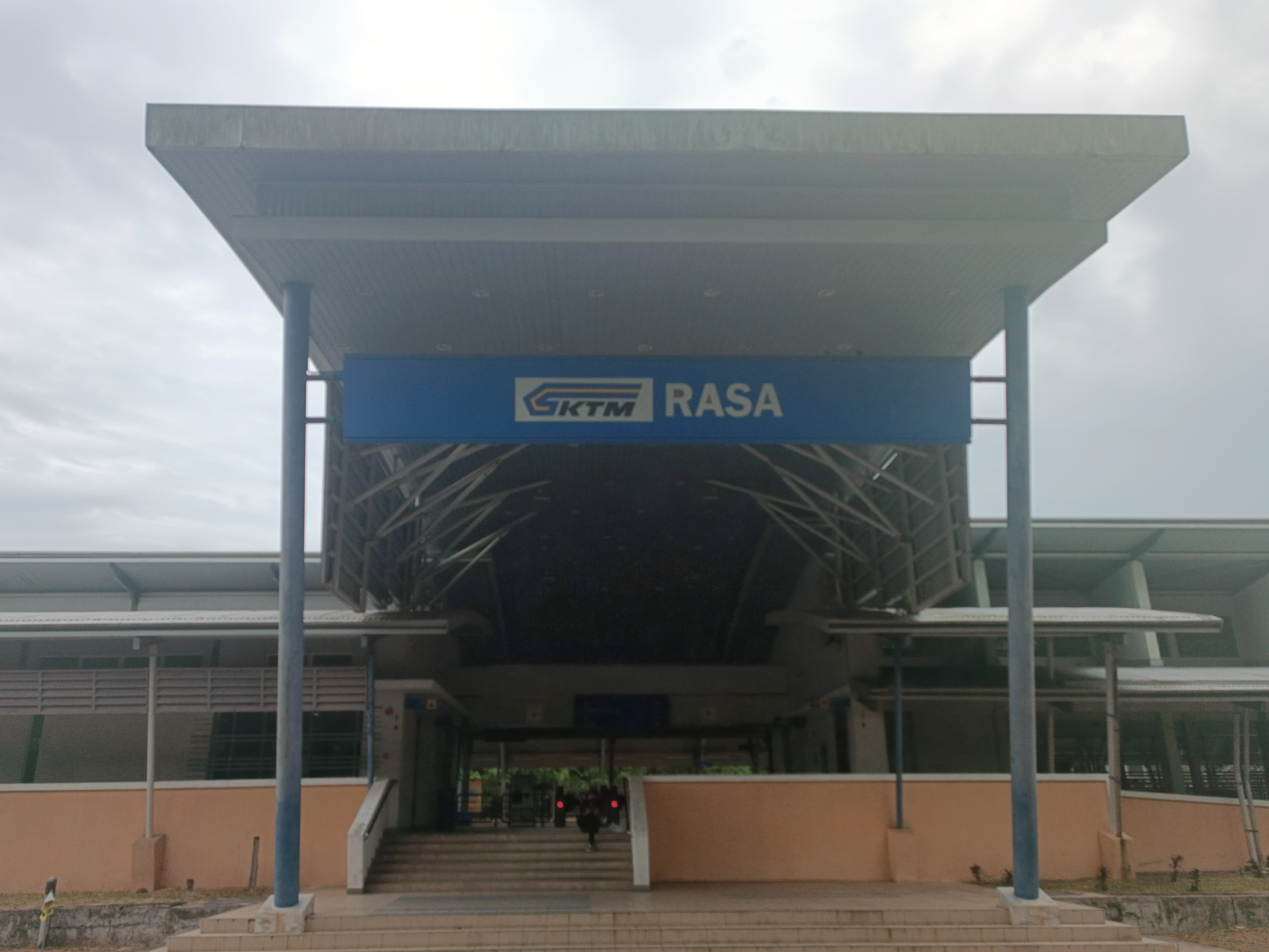
Main entrance of the Rasa station.

A platform view of the Rasa station.
