= Serendah Komuter station =

Railway station in Serendah, Malaysia

Coordinates: 3°22′33″N 101°36′53″E

Serendah

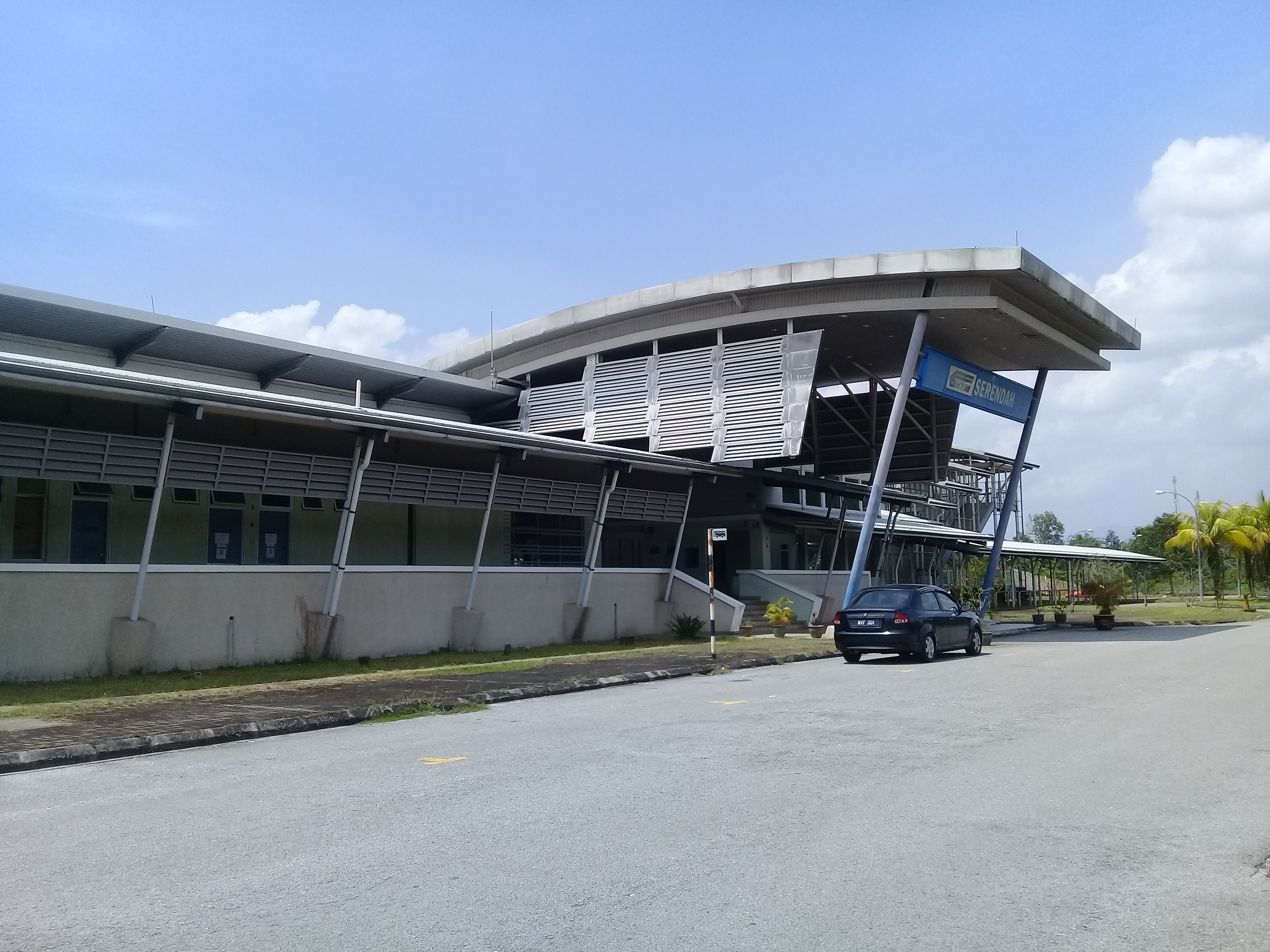
- The main entrance of the Serendah station.

General information
- Other names: Malay: سرنده (Jawi); Chinese: 双文丹; Tamil: செரண்டா
- Location: Serendah, Selangor, Malaysia.
- System: KA11 | Commuter rail station
- Owner: Keretapi Tanah Melayu
- Line: West Coast Line
- Platforms: 2 side platforms
- Tracks: 2

Construction
- Parking: Available, free.
- Accessible: Y

Other information
- Station code: KA11

History
- Opened: 10 July 1893
- Rebuilt: 21 April 2007
- Electrified: 21 April 2007

Services
Preceding station	KTM Komuter	Following station
Batang Kali towards Tanjung Malim	Tanjung Malim–Port Klang Line	Rawang towards Port Klang
Future development
Preceding station	Malaysia Rail Link	Following station
KTM Jalan Kastam towards Westport	East Coast Rail Link	Bentong towards Kota Bharu
Location

The Serendah Komuter station is a Malaysian commuter train station stationed roughly two kilometres northwest from the town of Serendah, Selangor. The station is located on the KTM West Coast Line.

The station is served by the KTM Komuter's Tanjung Malim–Port Klang Line since 2016. Before that, it was served by the Rawang–Tanjung Malim shuttle service until this service was merged with the Port Klang Line (now Tanjung Malim–Port Klang Line), resulting in the northern terminus of the line moving from the Rawang railway station to the Tanjung Malim railway station.

== Facilities ==
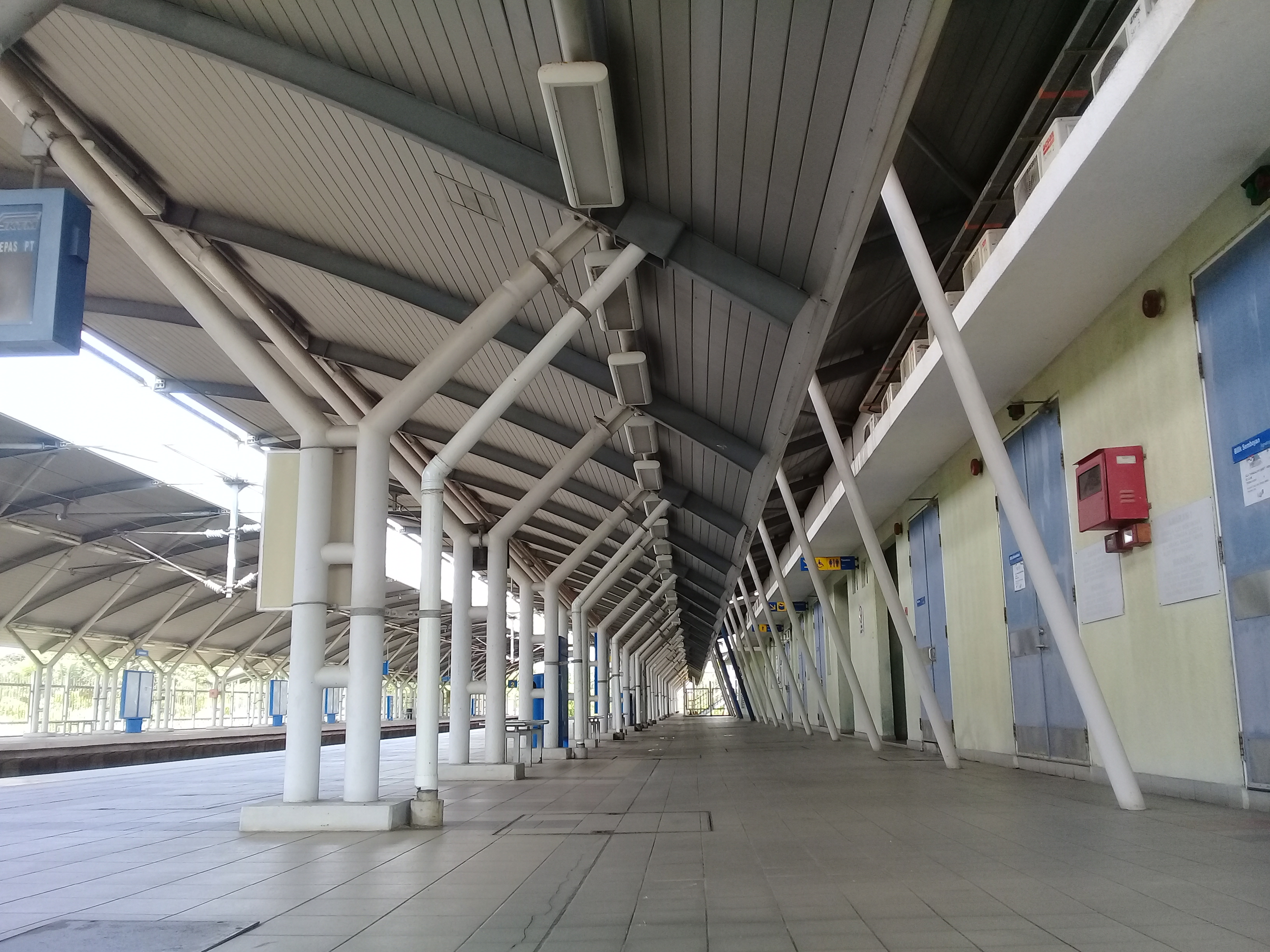
A platform view of the Serendah station.

The station is situated along two tracks but contains facilities normally reserved for medium-to-large stations along three or more lines. In addition to ticketing facilities and basic amenities, the station contains spaces for administrative occupants, as well as a "kiosk" and an additional foot bridge (fused with a foot bridge exclusively for Komuter users) for pedestrians that simply intend to cross the railway lines. The station also includes low-tech support for disabled passengers. The station exits northeast towards a road, which reaches the town of Serendah an estimated two kilometres south.

The Serendah station's two side platforms are designated as platform 1 (adjoining the main station building at the east, intended for southbound trains) and platform 2 (at the west, intended for northbound trains).

== History ==
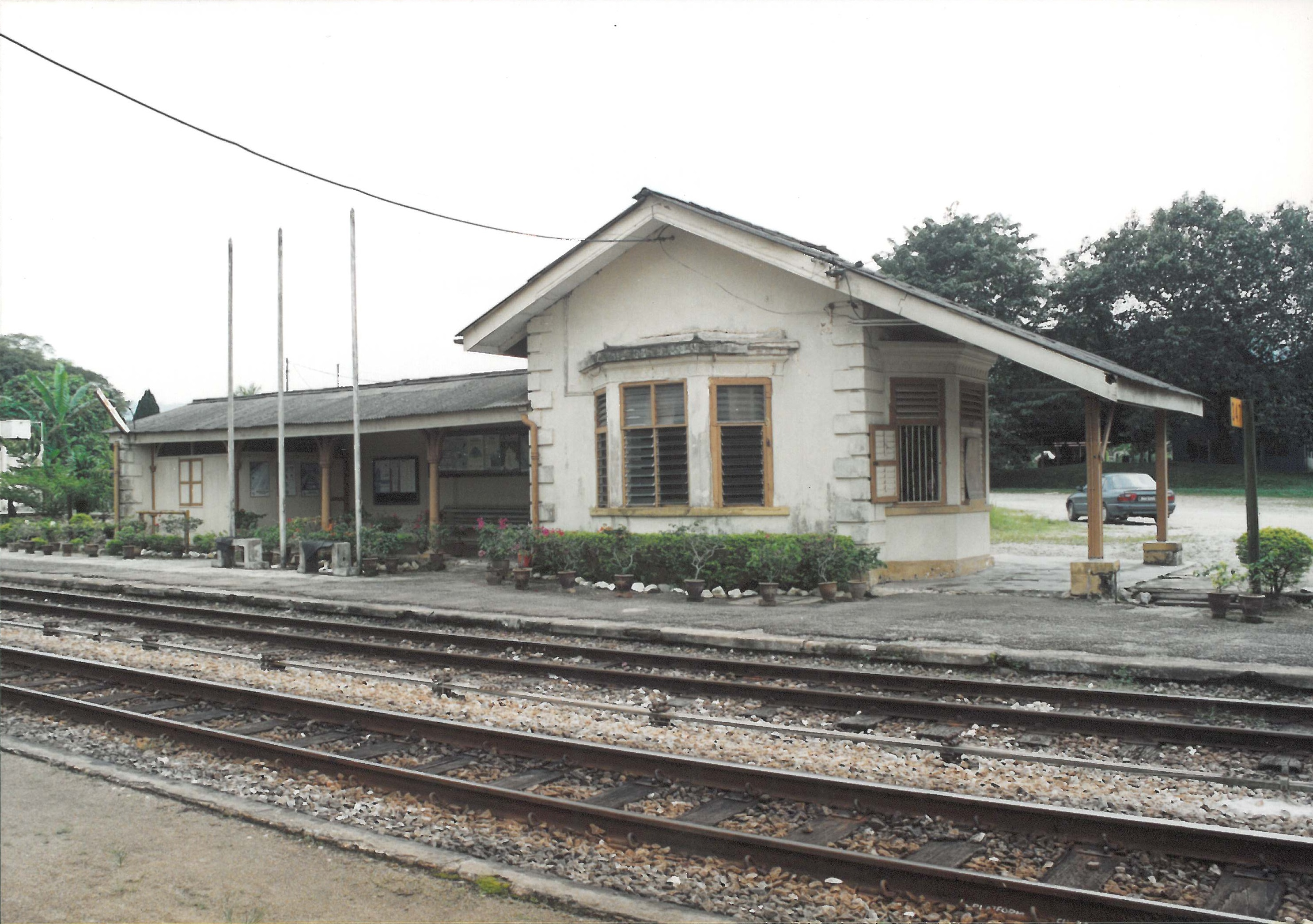
The old Serendah railway station.

The West Coast Line reached Serendah in 1893 when the stretch between the town and Rawang to the south was completed and opened to traffic.

Prior to the Rawang–Ipoh Electrification and Double-Tracking Project, the old Serendah railway station was located in town, accessed by a side road running westwards from the main road at the police station. There are no records as to whether this station, a masonry building, was the first station at Serendah, and whether the station was built and completed together with the opening of the railway line in 1893.

The old masonry station had one main track and a loop for trains to pass along the single track. There were also sidings for stabling of freight wagons to the south of the station. One unique feature was that the station was located on the first loop track and not the main line, resulting in trains which are channelled into the loop stopping at the station platform.

The old station was not a stop for passenger trains and was used mostly for trains to pass.

The old station was demolished under the Rawang–Ipoh electrification and double-tracking project between 2002 and 2007, as the location was required for the future double tracks.

The current new station was built at a new location two kilometres north of Serendah and opened on 21 April 2007 together with the Rasa and Batang Kali stations. It was the first stop in the Rawang–Tanjung Malim shuttle service until the service was merged with the Port Klang Line in 2016.
