= Sungai Buloh station =

Train station in Selangor, Malaysia

KA08 PY04 Sungai Buloh
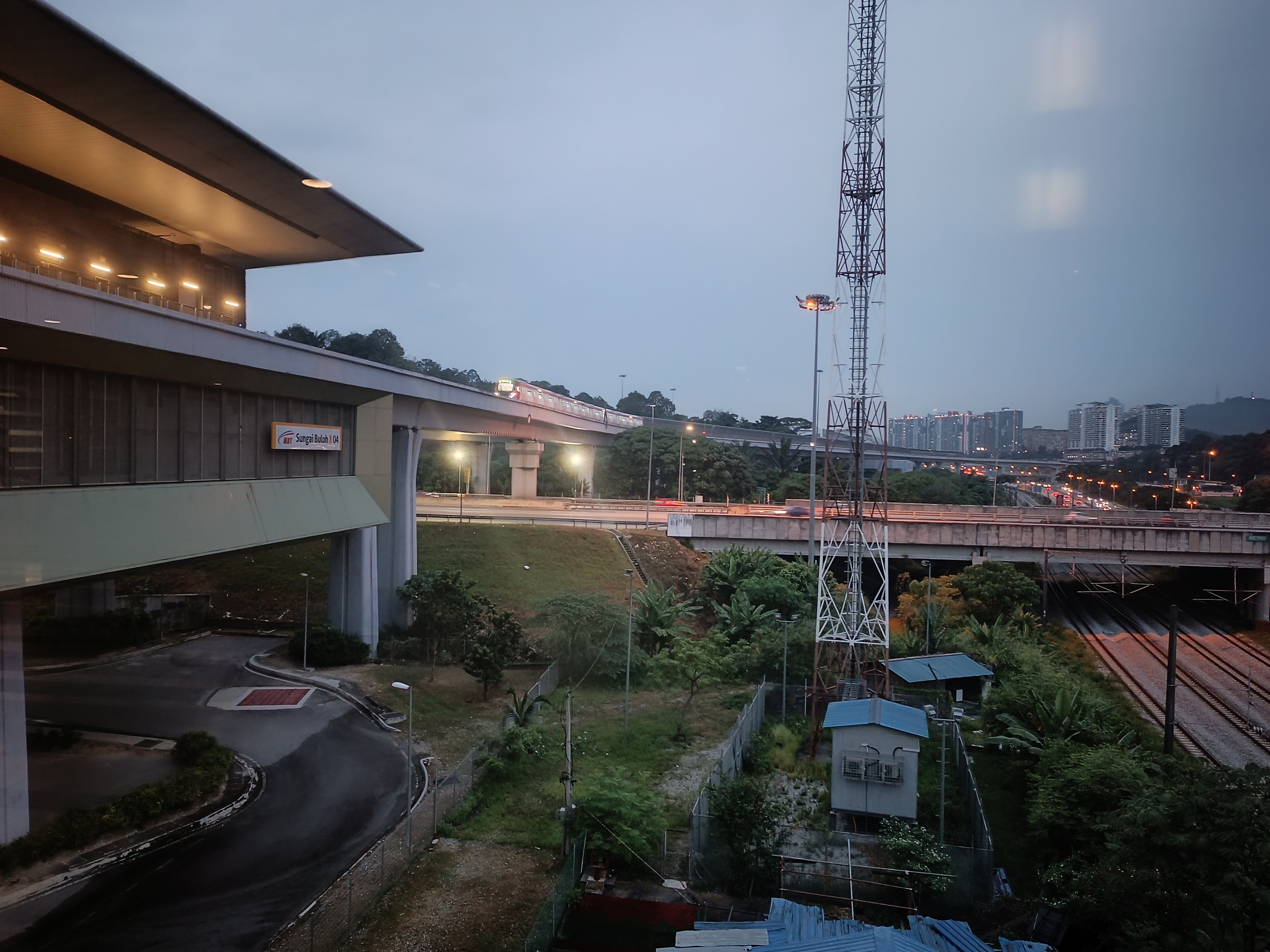
- The station's signboard after being transferred to the Putrajaya Line, with a trainset entering the station from Kampung Batu.

General information
- Other names: Malay: سوڠاي بولوه (Jawi); Chinese: 双溪毛糯; Tamil: சுங்கை பூலோ
- Location: Sungai Buloh; Selangor; Malaysia
- Coordinates: 3°12′22″N 101°34′49″E
- System: Rapid KL (MRT)
- Owner: Railway Assets Corporation (KTM); MRT Corp (MRT)
- Operator: Keretapi Tanah Melayu (KTM); Rapid Rail (MRT)
- Lines: West Coast Line; 12 Putrajaya Line
- Platforms: 2 side platforms (KTM); 1 island platform (MRT)
- Tracks: 4 (KTM); 2 (MRT)

Construction
- Structure type: KA08 At-grade; PY04 Elevated
- Parking: Available with payment (1,236 parking bays, 258 motorcycle bays)
- Cycle facilities: Available (16 bicycle bays)
- Accessible: Yes

Other information
- Station code: KA08 PY04 (from 16 June 2022); SBK01 (until 15 June 2022)

History
- Opened: 1892; 134 years ago (KTM); 16 December 2016; 9 years ago (Kajang Line); 16 June 2022; 4 years ago (Putrajaya Line)
- Rebuilt: 2016; 10 years ago (KTM)
- Electrified: 1995; 31 years ago (KTM)

Services
Preceding station	KTM Komuter	Following station
Kuang towards Tanjung Malim	Tanjung Malim–Port Klang Line	Kepong Sentral towards Port Klang
Preceding station	ETS	Following station
Ipoh towards Padang Besar	KL Sentral–Padang Besar (Express)	Kuala Lumpur towards KL Sentral
Tanjung Malim towards Padang Besar	KL Sentral–Padang Besar (Platinum)	Kuala Lumpur towards KL Sentral
Tanjung Malim towards Butterworth	KL Sentral–Butterworth (Platinum)	Kuala Lumpur towards KL Sentral
Tanjung Malim towards Padang Besar	Padang Besar–JB Sentral (Platinum)	Kuala Lumpur towards JB Sentral
Tanjung Malim towards Butterworth	Butterworth–JB Sentral (Platinum)	Kuala Lumpur towards JB Sentral
Rawang towards Padang Besar	Padang Besar–JB Sentral (Gold)	Kuala Lumpur towards JB Sentral
Batang Kali towards Butterworth	Butterworth–Segamat (Gold)	Kuala Lumpur towards Segamat
Rawang towards Ipoh	KL Sentral–Ipoh (Gold)	Kepong Sentral towards KL Sentral
Preceding station		Following station
Kampung Selamat towards Kwasa Damansara	Putrajaya Line	Damansara Damai towards Putrajaya Sentral
Location

The Sungai Buloh station is an integrated train station serving the suburb of Sungai Buloh in Selangor, Malaysia. It is located to the northwest of Malaysia's capital city, Kuala Lumpur.

It is an interchange station, with one section catering to KTM Komuter's Tanjung Malim–Port Klang Line and KTM ETS services, and another section for the Putrajaya Line (formerly the Kajang Line). However, there is no paid-area integration between the two sections as the two services use different ticketing systems and are operated by two different companies. The newly built integrated station was opened on 16 December 2016 together with the opening of the first phase of the MRT Sungai Buloh - Kajang Line (now known as the MRT Kajang Line).

The station was the northern terminus of the MRT Kajang Line until October 8, 2021 after which the MRT portion of the station was closed along with Kampung Selamat and Kwasa Damansara until the opening of the MRT Putrajaya Line.

The station was temporarily closed for migration work for the MRT SSP Line / MRT Putrajaya Line from November 17-18, 2018 for early track and system connection works, March 9-10, 2019 for track switch installation for depot access, June 27-28 & November 14-15, 2020 for further migration works. The station was closed on October 9, 2021 till the official opening of MRT Putrajaya Line Phase 1 on 16 June 2022.

== Location ==
The station is situated north of Jalan Kuala Selangor, near its intersection with Jalan Sungai Buloh and Jalan Hospital. Notably, the integrated station complex sits across two different local government and district boundaries. The KTM portion of the station and its tracks are located within the jurisdiction of the Shah Alam City Council (MBSA) in the Petaling District, whereas the MRT portion and its elevated structures fall under the jurisdiction of the Selayang Municipal Council (MPS) in the Gombak District. The current complex was built on the site of the former Sungai Buloh railway station, integrating parts of the original structure into the new development.

== History ==
=== First station ===
The first Sungai Buloh railway station opened in 1892 when the section of the main railway line (now the KTM West Coast railway line) between Batu Junction and Rawang was completed and opened for service.

=== Old KTM Komuter station ===
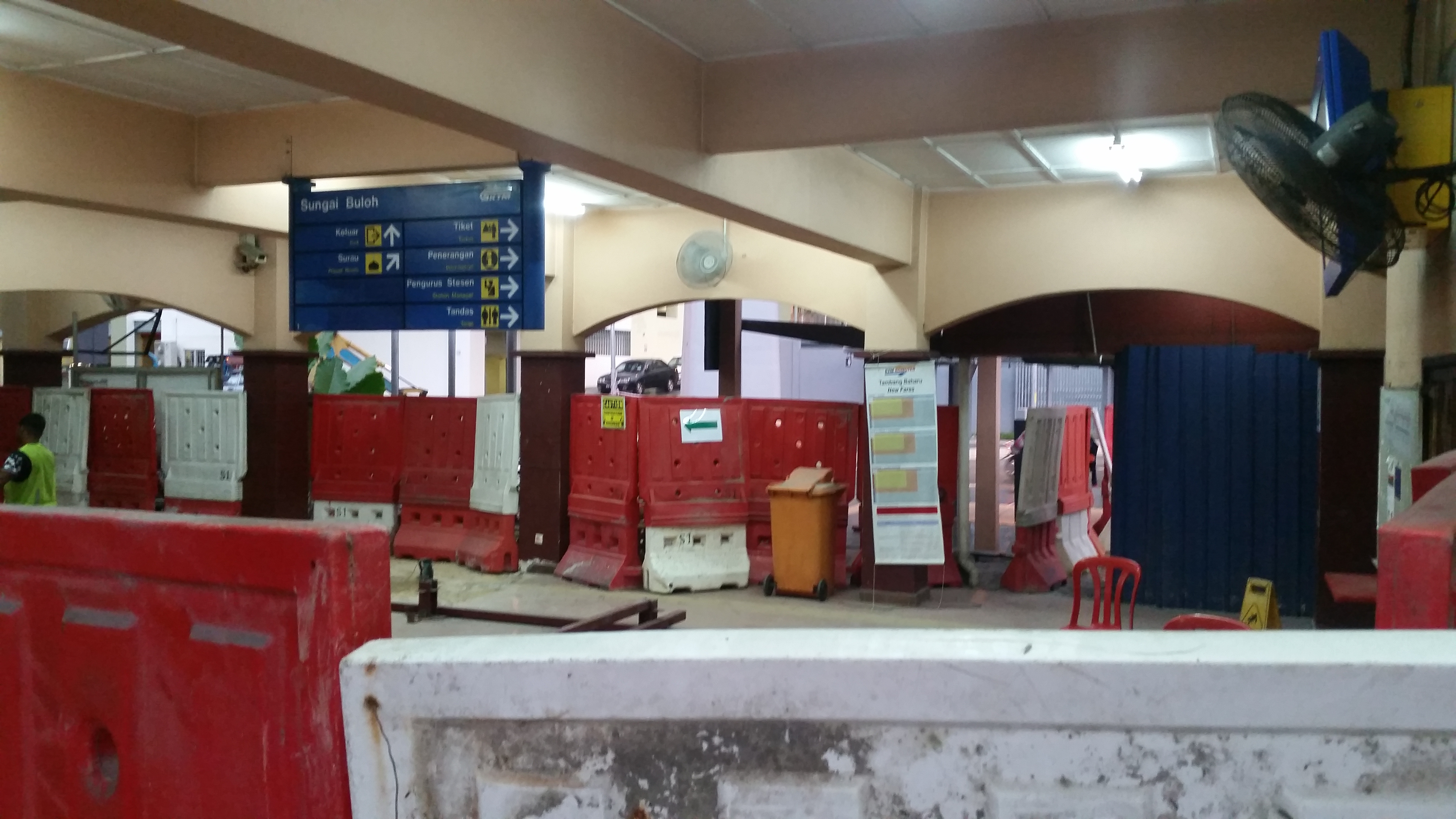
The old railway station being dismantled

The station underwent massive refurbishment as part of the Klang Valley electrification and double-tracking project, which saw the station becoming one of the stops for the new KTM Komuter service in 1995. The station was originally on the Rawang-Seremban line until 2016, when a revamp of the KTM Komuter service network saw the station serving the Tanjung Malim–Port Klang Line, with trains running between Tanjung Malim and Port Klang.

The station was built with four tracks, comprising two side platforms serving the two outer tracks, and two inner tracks serving as bypass routes for freight trains that did not stop at the station. A pedestrian overhead bridge, which was later retrofitted with lifts to make it disabled-friendly, linked the two platforms. The main entrance, along with the main station building, was located on the southbound platform. In 2010, KTM ETS intercity services were introduced to the station and have been serving it ever since.

=== Integrated interchange station ===
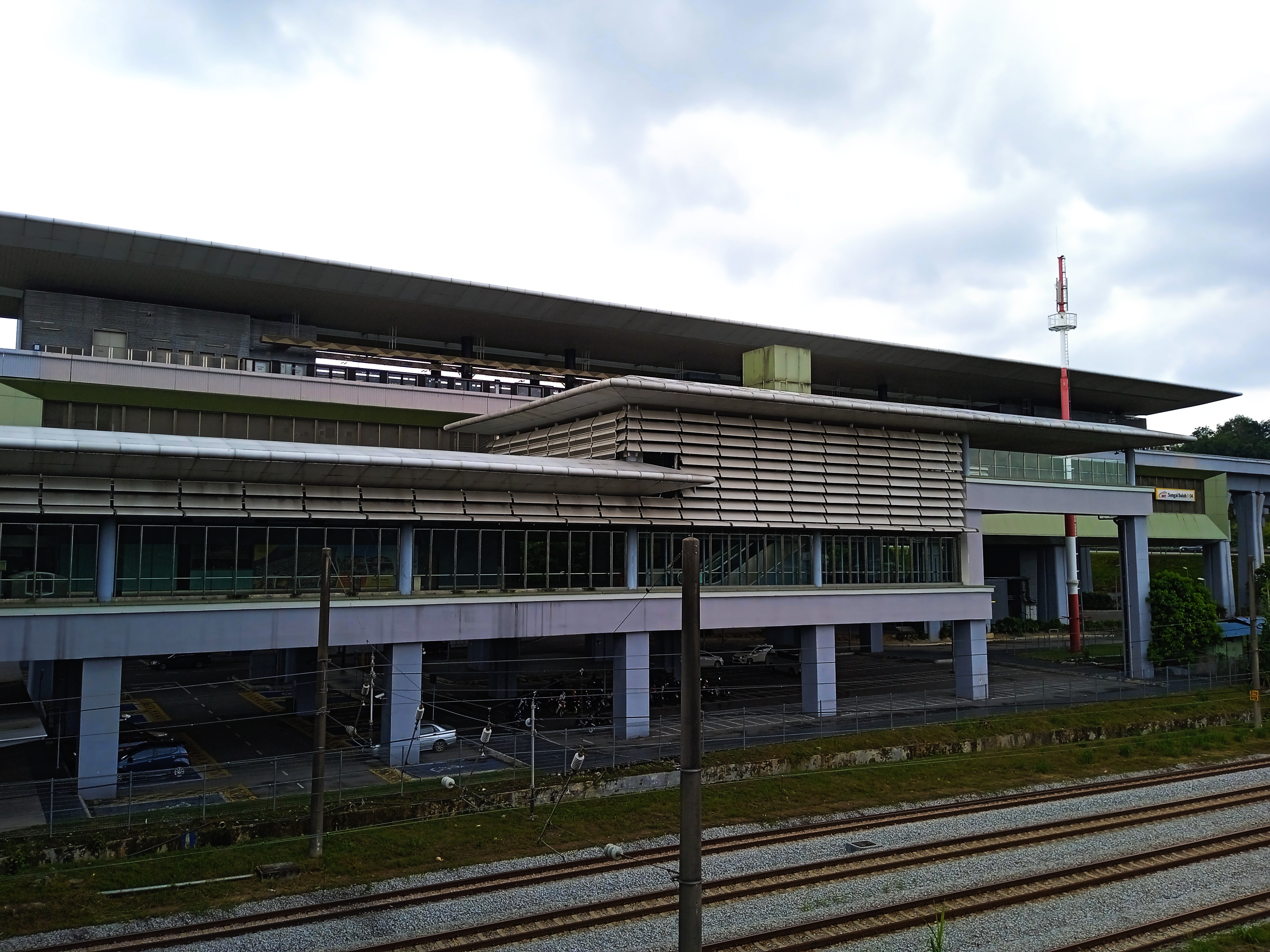
Exterior view of the Sungai Buloh MRT station

When construction of the Klang Valley Mass Rapid Transit (KVMRT) project began in 2010, the MRT station was designed to be one of four interchange stations between the MRT Kajang Line (prior to its switch to the MRT Putrajaya Line) and the KTM Komuter railway network. The other interchange stations are Muzium Negara (connecting to KL Sentral), Pasar Seni (connecting to Kuala Lumpur), and Kajang.

The new station was constructed next to the then-existing KTM station building, occupying what was previously an at-grade open-air car park. The MRT section and the common concourse of the station, which partially spans over the KTM tracks, were built while the KTM station remained fully operational throughout the construction period. The integrated station was officially opened as part of the Phase One launch of the MRT Kajang Line on 16 December 2016.

With the completion and opening of the new integrated station, the old KTM station structure was dismantled. The KTM ticketing office and other administrative offices were relocated to the common concourse of the new station building. Only the original KTM station platforms were retained, while the old entrance at the southbound platform was permanently sealed off. The platforms were renovated to enable direct access to the new KTM concourse.

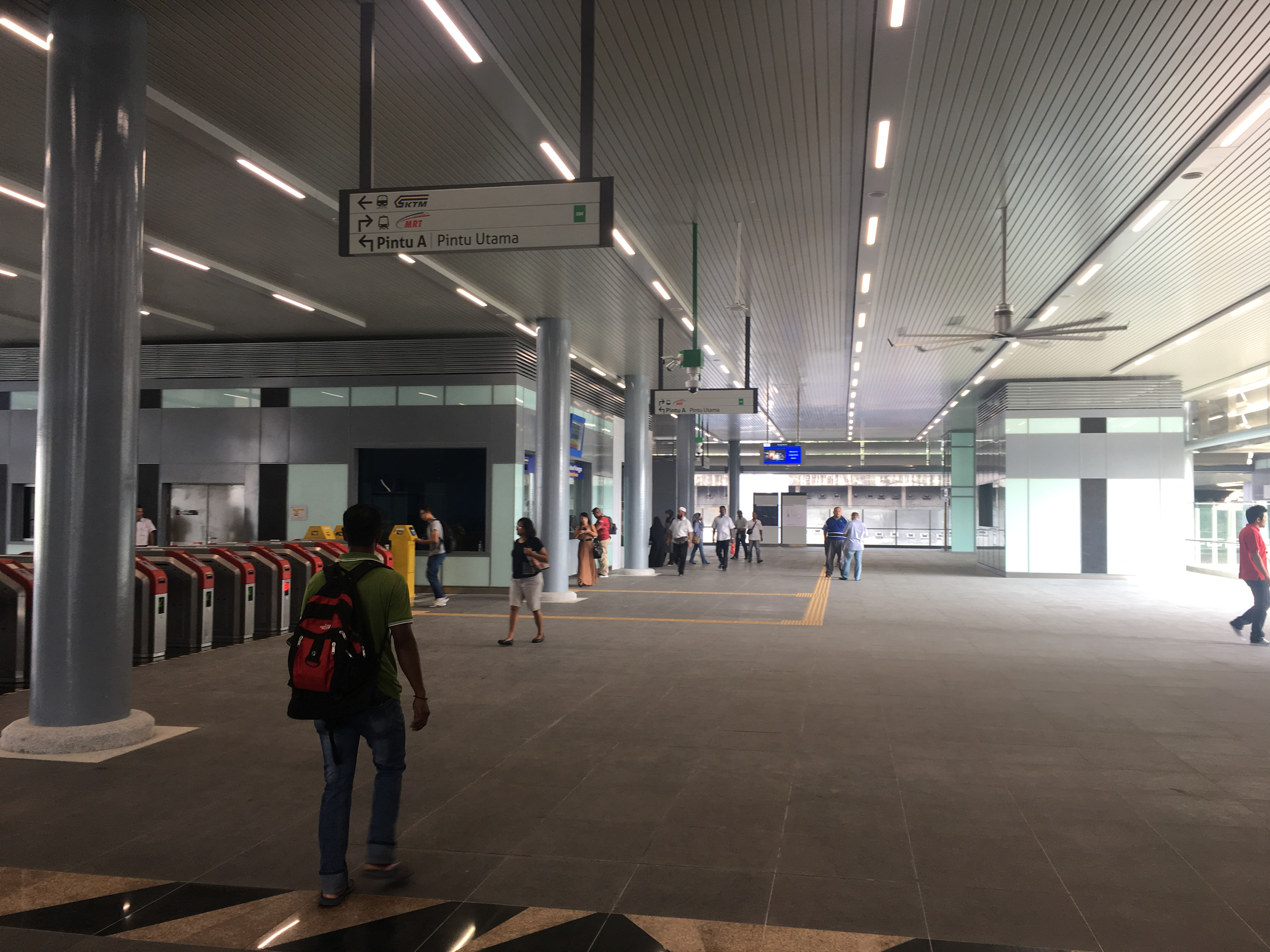
The common concourse of the Sungai Buloh KTM and MRT Station, with the fare gates to the KTM section on the left and the MRT gates on the right.

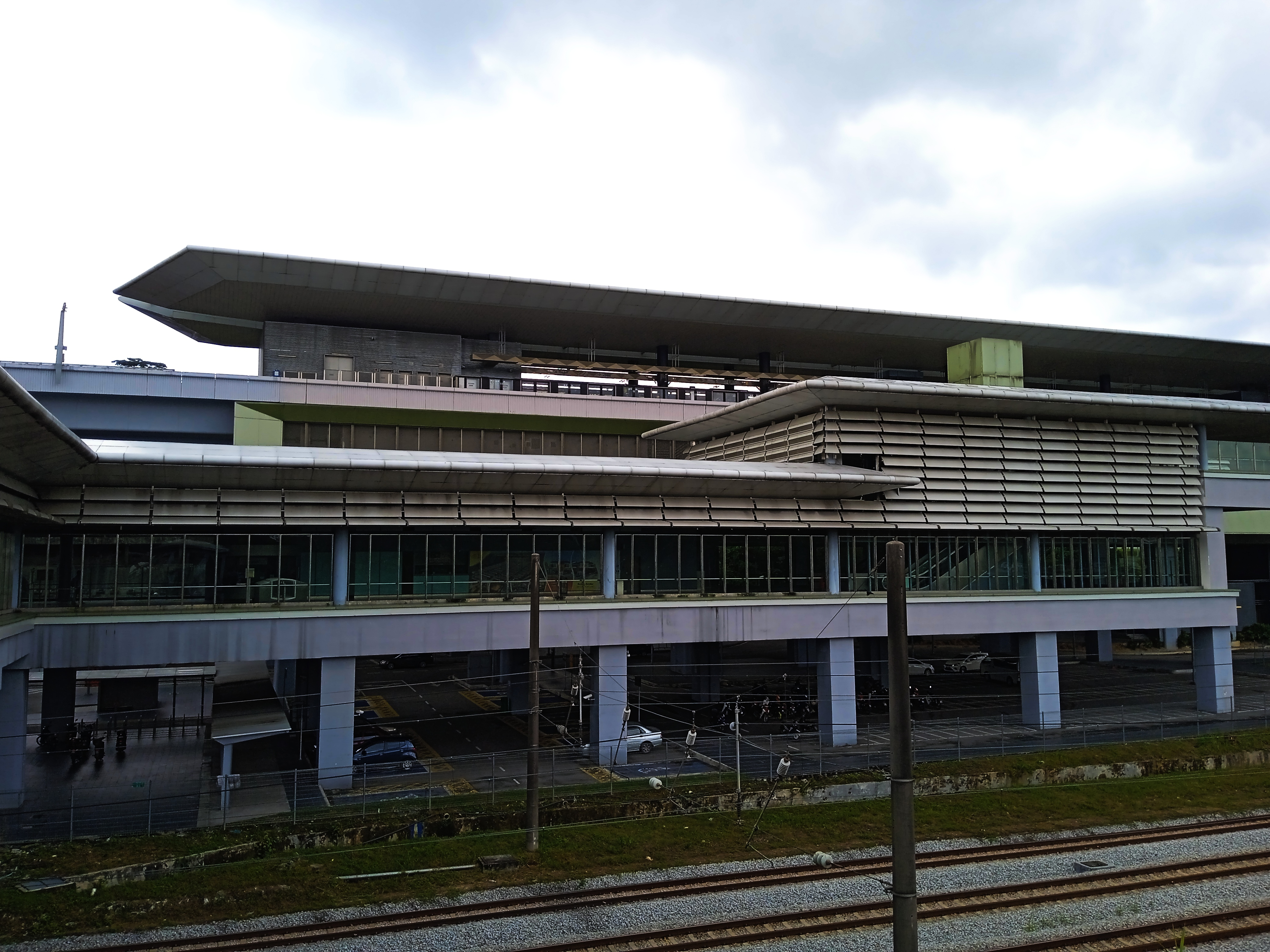
Exterior view of the MRT concourse and the upper concourse structure from Entrance B.

=== Park and ride facility ===
As part of the construction of the MRT Kajang Line, a six-storey multi-storey park and ride facility was also constructed at this station. The facility provides 1,236 parking bays for cars and 258 for motorcycles. The parking charge is RM4.30 per day for cars and RM1.10 for motorcycles. Parking fees can only be paid using Touch 'n Go cards.

== Train services ==
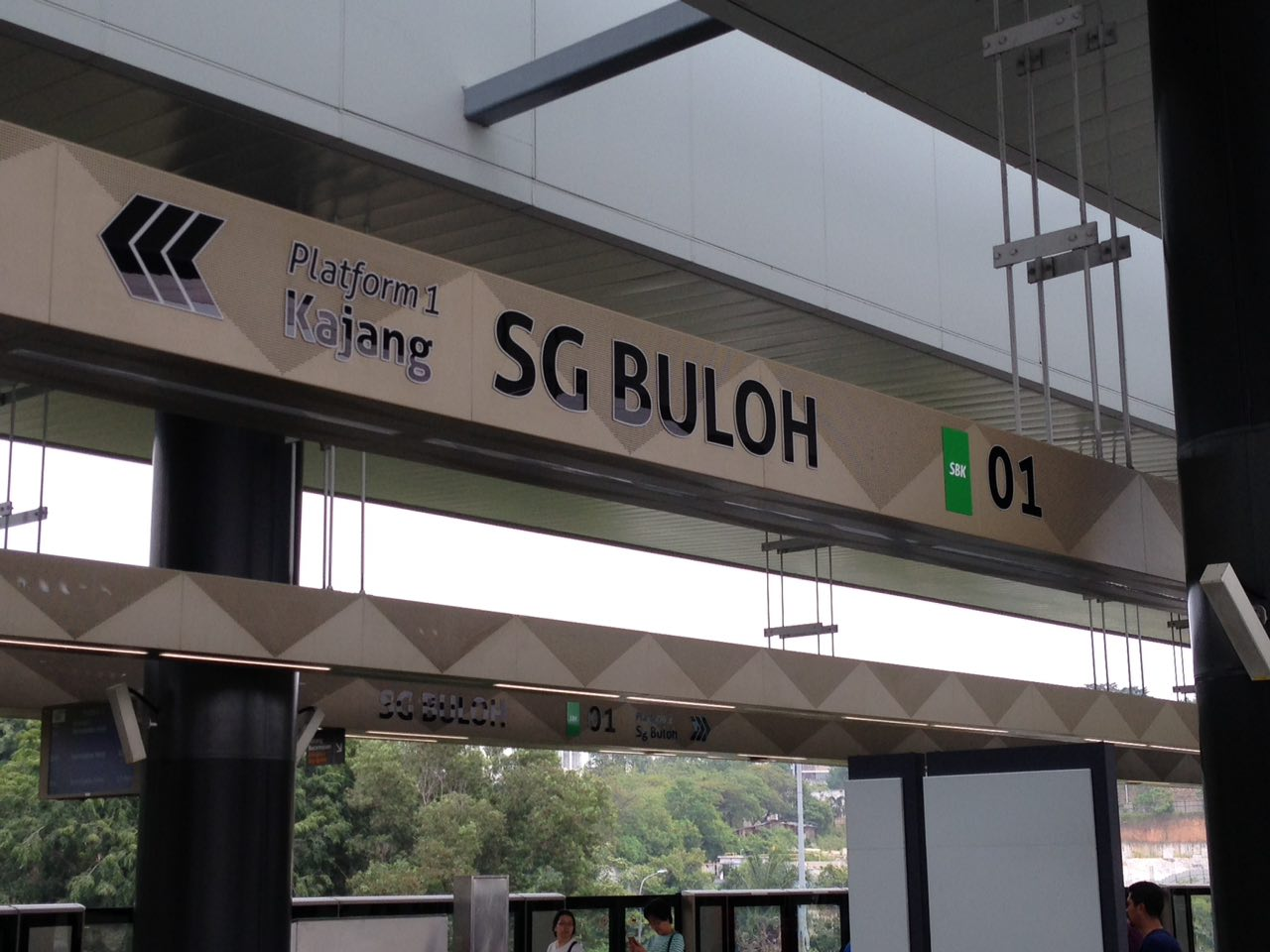
The MRT Sungai Buloh station platform prior to its transfer to the Putrajaya Line.

A KTM Class 83 train at the KTM Komuter platform operating the Tanjung Malim-Sungai Buloh route shuttle service.

The Sungai Buloh station is served by the following train services:

- Keretapi Tanah Melayu (KTM)
  - KTM Komuter Tanjung Malim–Port Klang Line
  - KTM ETS Express, Platinum, and Gold trains
- Rapid KL
  - Putrajaya Line

When Phase One operations for the MRT Putrajaya Line began on 16 June 2022, this station became a part of this new line and ceased to be part of the MRT Kajang Line. The portion of the alignment between this station and Kwasa Damansara was transferred to the MRT Putrajaya Line, effectively making Kwasa Damansara the new northern terminus and the interchange point for both the MRT Kajang Line and the MRT Putrajaya Line.

== Bus services ==
=== Feeder bus services ===
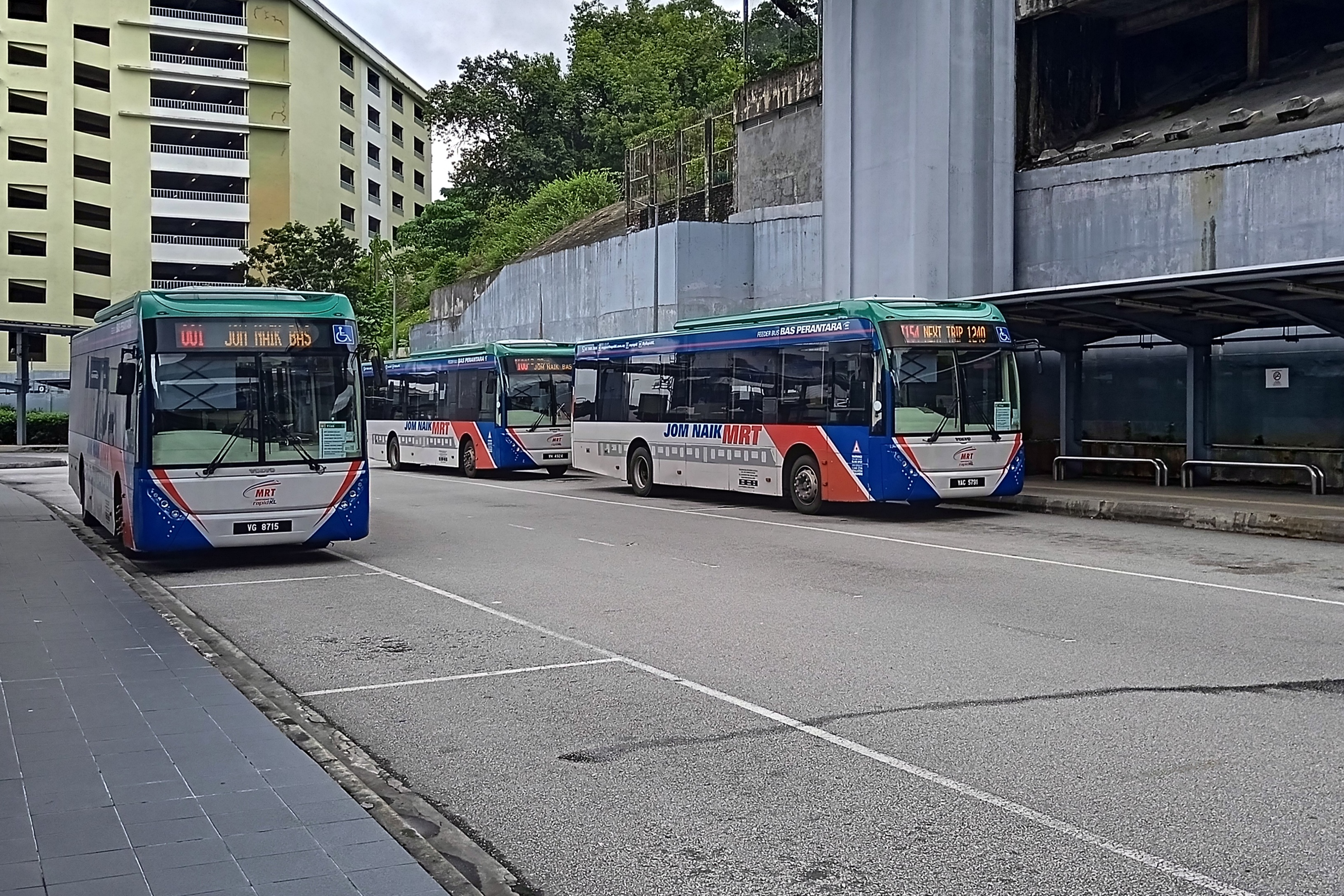
MRT feeder buses waiting at the Sungai Buloh station lay-by.

During the opening of the MRT Kajang Line, feeder buses also began operating, linking the station with several housing areas and villages in and around Sungai Buloh. The feeder buses operate from the station's feeder bus hub, which is accessed via Entrance A. Four initial feeder bus routes (T100, T101, T102, and T103) were introduced during the opening of the MRT station in 2016, though route T103 was later relocated to Damansara Damai station in June 2022. Feeder bus route T105 was introduced on 1 December 2017. Two additional feeder bus routes, T154 and T155, were introduced in December 2023 and ran on a trial period until September 2024.

Route No.	Origin	Destination	Via
T100	KA08 PY04 Sungai Buloh	Hospital Sungai Buloh, UiTM Sungai Buloh	Jalan Hospital
T101	KA08 PY04 Sungai Buloh	Bukit Rahman Putra	Jalan Hospital, Jalan Kusta, Kampung Melayu Sungai Buloh, Persiaran Bukit Rahman 3, Persiaran Bukit Rahman Putra 1, Jalan Besar Bandar Baru Sungai Buloh, Jalan Kuala Selangor
T102	KA08 PY04 Sungai Buloh	Kampung Paya Jaras, Kubu Gajah, Aman Suria	Jalan Kuala Selangor, Jalan Paya Jaras Tengah, Jalan Kubu Gajah
T105	KA08 PY04 Sungai Buloh	Matang Pagar	Jalan Kusta, Jalan Kampung Melayu Sungai Buloh, Jalan Matang Pagar, Jalan SP 4, Jalan SP 17
T154	KA08 PY04 Sungai Buloh	Kuang	Kundang, Gamuda Gardens, Gamuda Luge, Kampung Setia
T155	KA08 PY04 Sungai Buloh	Kota Puteri	Batu Arang, Bandar Seri Coalfields, Taman Desa Coalfields, Sungai Pelong, Paya Jaras

=== Trunk bus services ===
Trunk bus services do not enter the station's bus hub area but stop at designated bus stops along Jalan Kuala Selangor. From these bus stops, access to the station is provided via the overhead pedestrian bridge connecting to Entrance B of the station.

Route No.	Origin	Destination	Via
Selangor Omnibus Service
100	Hab Lebuh Pudu (near AG7 SP7 KJ13 Masjid Jamek)	Kuala Selangor	Ijok
KS02	Bandar Saujana Utama / Puncak Alam	KA08 PY04 Sungai Buloh	
107	Hab Lebuh Pudu	Bestari Jaya (Batang Berjuntai)	Ijok

== See also ==
- Subang Jaya and Kajang stations, which are designed in a similar fashion.
