= Kuala Kubu Bharu railway station =

Railway station in Kuala Kubu Bharu, Malaysia

Coordinates: 3.553007°N 101.640006°E

Kuala Kubu Bharu

General information
- Other names: Malay: کوالا کوبو بارو (Jawi); Chinese: 新古毛; Tamil: கோலா குபு பாரு
- Location: Kuala Kubu Bharu, Selangor, Malaysia.
- System: KA14 | Commuter rail station
- Owner: Keretapi Tanah Melayu
- Line: West Coast Line
- Platforms: 2 side platforms
- Tracks: 2
- Connections: Selangor Smart Bus MPHS (HS01)

Construction
- Parking: Available, free.
- Accessible: Y

Other information
- Station code: KA14

History
- Opened: January 5, 2008

Services
Preceding station	KTM Komuter	Following station
Tanjung Malim Terminus	Tanjung Malim–Port Klang Line	Rasa towards Port Klang

Other services
Preceding station	ETS	Following station
Former ETS service terminated on 1 January 2026
Tanjung Malim towards Ipoh	KL Sentral–Ipoh (Silver)	Batang Kali towards Kuala Lumpur Sentral
Location

The Kuala Kubu Bharu railway station is a Malaysian train station located at the northern side of and named after the town of Kuala Kubu Bharu, Selangor. The station is served by KTM Komuter's Tanjung Malim–Port Klang Line service. The station was opened on 5 January 2008. The station replaced the former Kuala Kubu Road station approximately 2.5 km northwest. In the last station on the KTM West Coast railway line in the state of Selangor before the railway line crosses the state border into Perak

It was the fourth stop on KTM Komuter's Rawang–Tanjung Malim shuttle service (formerly known as the Rawang–Kuala Kubu Bharu shuttle service) until direct services to Port Klang were introduced in 2016.

The station, as are all the other stations along the shuttle route (except Tanjung Malim), is situated along two tracks with two platforms like most station halts along the KTM Komuter network, but contains facilities normally reserved for medium-to-large stations with three or more tracks. In addition to ticketing facilities and basic amenities, the station contains spaces for administrative occupants, as well as a kiosk and an additional footbridge (fused with a footbridge exclusively for Komuter users) for pedestrians that simply intend to cross the railway lines. The station also includes low-tech support for disabled passengers. The station exits northeast into a branch road that leads east into the town centre of Kuala Kubu Bharu.

The Kuala Kubu Bharu station's two side platforms are designated as Platform 1 (adjoining the main station building at the east, intended for southbound trains) and Platform 2 (at the west, intended for northbound trains).

On 1st January 2026, the KTM ETS Silver service between KL Sentral and Ipoh was terminated. Therefore, this station, which was previously part of the service, is no longer served by the ETS.
