= KTM Komuter =

Commuter rail system in Malaysia

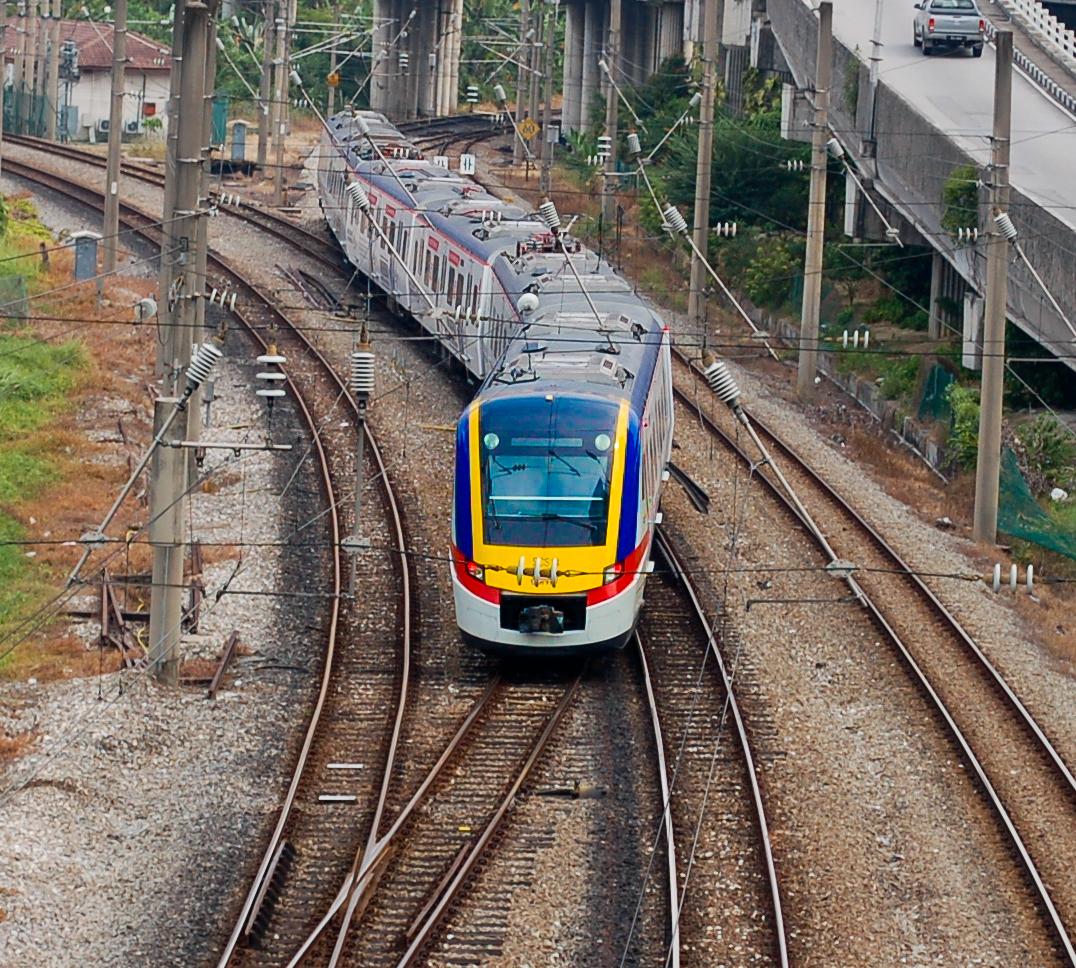
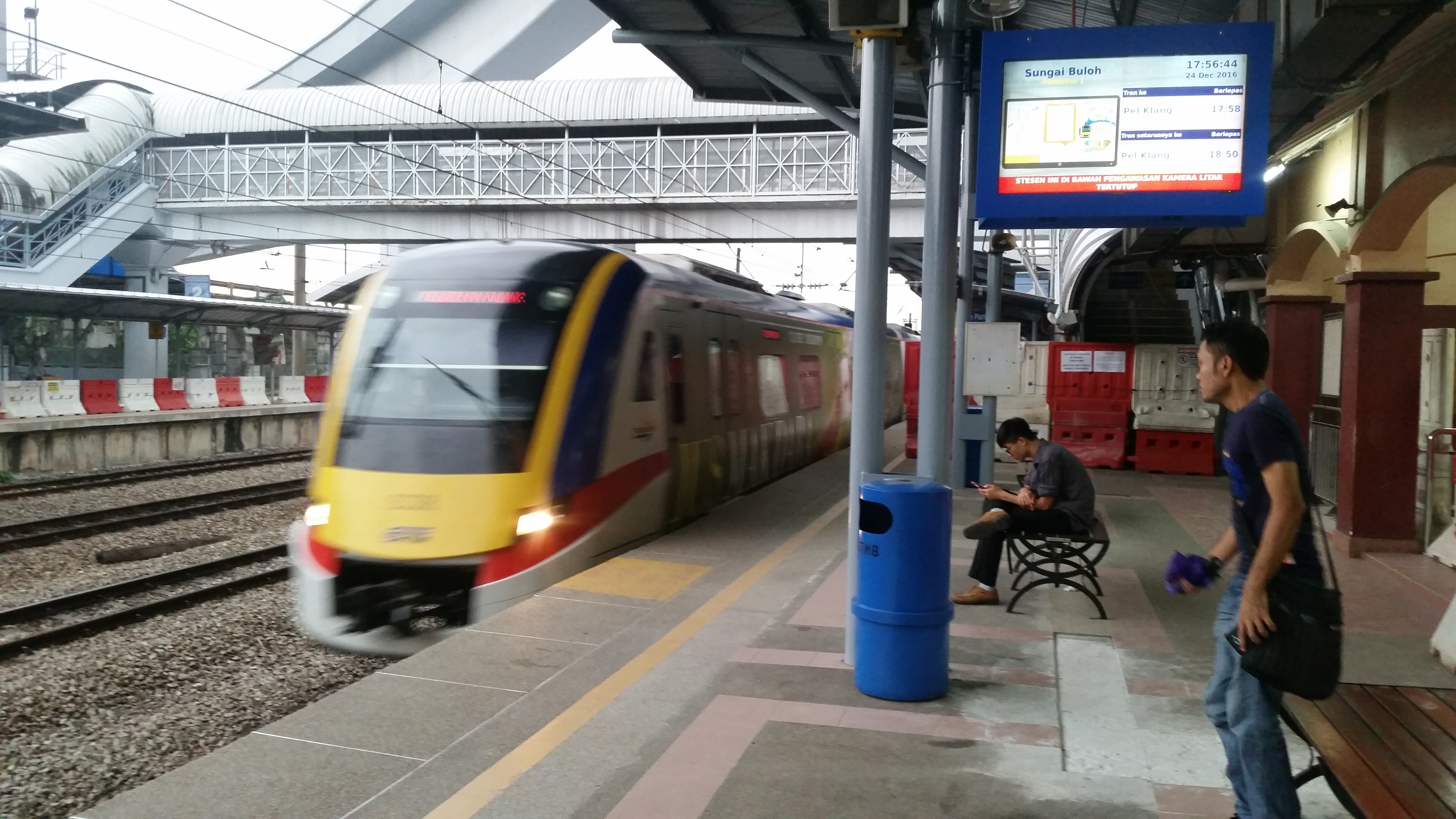
- Clockwise from top: A Class 92 set at KL Sentral/Bangsar Junction, A Class 92 set arriving at Sungai Buloh station, Interior of a KL Sentral-Terminal Skypark train.

Overview
- Owner: Railway Assets Corporation
- Locale: Central Sector Klang Valley, northern Selangor, Tanjong Malim (Perak), Negeri Sembilan, Malacca; Northern Sector Central and northern Perak, Seberang Perai, Kedah, Perlis; Southern Sector Kluang, Kulai, Johor Bahru, Pasir Gudang
- Stations: 86 (Note: Counting interchange stations only once.)
- Colour on map: 1 2 10 (Central Sector); 1 2 (Northern Sector); 1 2 (Southern Sector)
- Website: www.ktmb.com.my

Service
- Type: Commuter rail
- Operator: Keretapi Tanah Melayu (Komuter Division)
- Rolling stock: KTM Class 24 Locomotive (temporary); KTM Class 25 Locomotive (temporary); KTM Class 26 Locomotive (temporary); KTM Class 81 3-car formation; KTM Class 83 3-car formation; KTM Class 92 6-car formation
- Daily ridership: 30,721 (Total, Q4 2026); 12,119 (Central Sector, Q4 2026); 18,602 (Northern Sector, Q4 2026)
- Ridership: 16.84 million (Total, 2025); 10.45 million (Central Sector, 2025); 6.39 million (Northern Sector, 2025)

History
- Opened: 14 August 1995; 31 years ago

Technical
- Line length: 633 km (393 mi)
- Track gauge: 1,000 mm (3 ft 3 3/8 in) metre gauge
- Electrification: 25 kV 50 Hz AC overhead line
- Conduction system: With driver

KTM Komuter is a commuter rail system in Malaysia operated by Keretapi Tanah Melayu (KTM). It was introduced in 1995 to provide local rail services in Kuala Lumpur and the surrounding Klang Valley suburban areas. Services were later expanded to other parts of Malaysia with the introduction of the Northern and Southern sectors.

The service uses air-conditioned electric multiple units in 3 and 6-car formations.

KTM Komuter contributed RM146.2 million to group revenue in 2017, carrying a total of 37.235 million passengers. The total number of passengers travelling with KTM Komuter in 2017 shows a decrease of 10.2%. This can be attributed to reduced service frequency due to the ongoing Klang Valley Double Tracking (KVDT) rehabilitation project.

== Network ==
=== Current network ===
Sector	Line	First operated	Stations	Length	Terminal	
Central	1 Batu Caves–Pulau Sebang Line	14 August 1995	27	135 km	Batu Caves	Pulau Sebang/Tampin
Central	2 Tanjung Malim–Port Klang Line	14 August 1995	35	126 km	Tanjung Malim	Port Klang
Central	10 KL Sentral–Terminal Skypark Line	1 May 2018	3	26 km	KL Sentral	Terminal Skypark
Northern	1 Ipoh–Butterworth Line	11 September 2015	13	104 km	Butterworth	Ipoh
Northern	2 Padang Besar–Butterworth Line	1 January 2016	13	169.8 km	Padang Besar	Butterworth
Southern	1 Paloh–JB Sentral Line	16 June 2026	7	110.1 km	Paloh	JB Sentral
Southern	2 Kempas Baru–Pasir Gudang Line	16 June 2026	2	40 km	Kempas Baru	Pasir Gudang
TOTAL			90 (Note: Counting interchange stations only once.)	710.9 km		

==== Central Sector ====
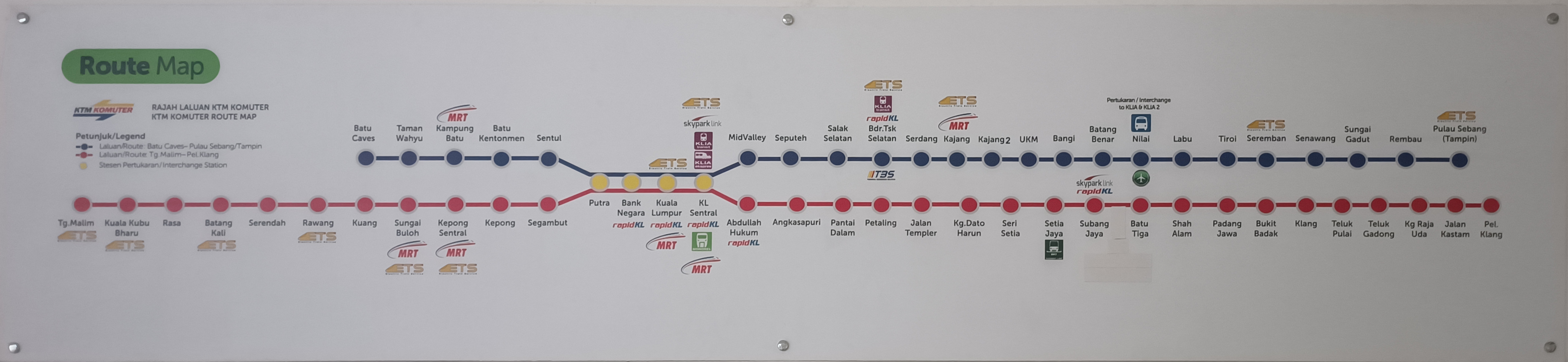
KTM Komuter route map at Kajang 2

KTM Komuter's 287 km (179 mi) network in the Central Sector mainly covers the Klang Valley. It has a total 58 stations. It consists of two cross-city routes, namely the Batu Caves–Pulau Sebang Line and the Tanjung Malim–Port Klang Line, and the airport rail link KL Sentral–Terminal Skypark Line.

Transfers between the two city lines can be made at any of the four stations on the central core: KL Sentral, Kuala Lumpur, Bank Negara and Putra. Each line and direction has a dedicated platform at KL Sentral, while the lines share the same platforms at the other three stations.

The KL Sentral–Terminal Skypark Line is a limited-express airport rail link service for passengers heading towards the Sultan Abdul Aziz Shah Airport (Subang Airport). Running between KL Sentral and Terminal Skypark, it makes one intermediate stop at Subang Jaya, before branching off to the airport. The service is the second airport rail link in Malaysia after the Express Rail Link. However, it is temporarily suspended due to low ridership.

The routes have been modified over the years. Previously, the Batu Caves-Pulau Sebang line (formerly, Seremban Line) trains would head towards Tanjung Malim while the Tanjung Malim-Port Klang line (formerly, Port Klang Line) trains would head to Batu Caves. Following a successful trial, the routes were swapped. Trains from Seremban began heading towards Batu Caves, while trains from Port Klang headed towards Tanjung Malim. The train service from Seremban was extended permanently to Pulau Sebang/Tampin, hence the current name of the line.

The service is subject to overcrowding during rush hours. Several steps were taken to alleviate this. Firstly, the operator introduced a new queuing system, in which the lines are painted on the floor with three colour codes representing each of the train set. Trains were also run in 3+3 formations, although this has been discontinued with the introduction of six-car sets.

==== Northern Sector ====
The KTM Komuter Northern Sector (Malay: KTM Komuter Utara) service initially operated between Gurun in Kedah, Butterworth in Penang and Kamunting in Perak. This followed the completion of electrification works on that stretch.

The route has been modified multiple times since. Today, there are two lines, namely the Padang Besar–Butterworth Line and the Ipoh–Butterworth Line. Butterworth, Bukit Tengah and Bukit Mertajam are interchange stations between the two lines.

==== Southern Sector ====
The KTM Komuter Southern Shuttle (Malay: KTM Komuter Shuttle Selatan) is the third and latest KTM Komuter serving the cities of Johor Bahru and Pasir Gudang, as well as the districts of Kulai and Kluang in the state of Johor. Launched on 16 June 2026, the service currently has two routes, namely the Paloh–JB Sentral Line and the Kempas Baru–Pasir Gudang Line. Kempas Baru is the only interchange station between the two lines. The service was introduced to complement the future Johor Bahru-Singapore Rapid Transit System.

== History ==
=== Central Sector ===
The first double-tracking and electrification project in Malaysia, which costed RM 1.5 billion, began in 1990. The project covered over a 150 km route stretching as far as Rawang, Port Klang and Seremban. Overhead electric cables between Rawang and Sungai Buloh were activated in December 1994. The first phase of the electric train service was planned to be from Sentul to Shah Alam via Kuala Lumpur.

Despite being planned to start operations in July 1995, the completion was delayed as of January 1995, causing the service to not launch on time.

As part of KTM's efforts to get the public to "think commuter", KTM offered free rides of the service from 2 to 11 August 1995.

The project was finally completed and service started on 12 August 1995 from Kuala Lumpur to Rawang, on what was the original Seremban Line. The commercial run of the service began two days later. KTM Komuter initially had 18 EMU trains and additional 62 trains purchased at RM 180 million. Each train carries about 240 passengers and would run at the speed of 100 kmh.

The line was extended to Salak Selatan on 29 September 1995. Operations between Sentul and Shah Alam began on 28 August 1995, on what was the original Port Klang Line. This line was extended to Klang on 29 September 1995. The Seremban Line was extended to Kajang on 20 November 1995 and to Seremban itself on 18 December 1995. This formed the Komuter network that will operate for more than a decade.

In the early 2000s, more stations were added along the existing route as in-fill stations. KL Sentral was added on 16 April 2001 and served as the new transport hub of Kuala Lumpur. Mid Valley was added on 23 August 2004, serving the Mid Valley Megamall. Kepong Sentral was added on 1 July 2006.

A Seremban-KL Sentral express service was introduced on 9 December 2004. The service was discontinued later before being reintroduced again on 25 July 2018. These services run only during the rush hour.

The Seremban Line was modified for the first time since 1995 when a shuttle train service from Rawang was introduce to Rasa with two stations Batang Kali and Serendah in between, in 2007. The shuttle was extended to Kuala Kubu Bharu in January 2008, and finally to Tanjung Malim on 1 June 2009.

Women-only coaches were introduced on 28 April 2010.

The Port Klang Line was extended to Batu Caves from Sentul on 29 July 2010. Three intermediate new stations, Batu Kentonmen, Kampung Batu and Taman Wahyu were opened with this extension.

The Seremban Line was extended from Seremban to Sungai Gadut on 14 May 2011 with an intermediate station at Senawang, and to Rembau in 2013.

Similar to the Rawang-Tanjung Malim shuttle, a Southern Sector shuttle service was introduced on 10 October 2015 following the completion of the Seremban-Gemas electrification and double-tracking project previously on 30 October 2013. This service is the second KTM Komuter service outside the Klang Valley after its northern counterpart, and ran from Seremban to Gemas.

From 15 December 2015, the routes of the Seremban Line and Port Klang Line were switched as part of a six-month trial. Trains from Seremban began heading towards Batu Caves, while trains from Port Klang headed towards Rawang, and vice versa. Transfers could be done at the four shared stations.

The Gemas and Batang Melaka stops on the Southern Sector shuttle were removed starting 20 June 2016 with the train terminating at Pulau Sebang/Tampin instead. Not long after, both the Rawang-Tanjung Malim shuttle and the Seremban-Pulau Sebang/Tampin shuttles were terminated in 11 July 2016, with the former routes being absorbed into the main Port Klang Line and Seremban Line respectively.

Following a successful trial of the swapped routes, the changes were made permanent. The names of the lines were changes from Seremban Line and Port Klang Line to Batu Caves-Pulau Sebang Line and Tanjung Malim-Port Klang Line respectively, reflecting the current termini of both lines.

No further changes were made to the Central Sector Komuter lines until 1 May 2018, when the KL Sentral-Terminal Skypark Line (then known as Skypark Link) to Subang Airport was launched. The line starts at KL Sentral, and shares a common route with the Tanjung Malim-Port Klang line from KL Sentral to Subang Jaya but skipping all stations in between. It will make a stop at Subang Jaya, before branching off and making its way to Terminal Skypark, a standalone station of the line located opposite the Subang Airport terminal building. However, since 15 February 2023, the KL Sentral-Terminal Skypark Line has been temporarily suspended due to poor ridership and the COVID-19 pandemic.

Twelve years after the last in-fill station was added to the system, the new Abdullah Hukum station was opened between KL Sentral and Angkasapuri on the Tanjung Malim-Port Klang Line on 28 October 2018. Roughly five years later, on 13 March 2023, the Kajang 2 station was added between Kajang and UKM on the Batu Caves-Pulau Sebang Line. The latest in-fill station added is Segambut Utara between Segambut and Kepong, officially opening on 11 May 2026.

=== Northern Sector ===
Northern Sector services were introduced on 11 September 2015 between Gurun in Kedah, Butterworth in Penang and Kamunting in Perak. This followed the completion of the Ipoh-Padang Besar electrification and double-tracking project in December 2014. On 1 January 2016, a second line was introduced between Butterworth and Padang Besar in Perlis, while on 17 January 2016, the Gurun-Butterworth-Kamunting route was split into two separate routes: Butterworth-Gurun and Butterworth-Kamunting. The three-line service operated until 1 July 2016 when the Butterworth-Gurun service was dropped. The Butterworth-Kamunting line was further modified on 1 September 2016, with the line starting two stations before Butterworth at Bukit Mertajam, and extended two stations beyond Kamunting to Taiping and Padang Rengas. The only common station and thus, the only interchange between the Padang Besar-Butterworth Line and Padang Rengas-Bukit Mertajam Line was Bukit Mertajam station.

The service continued to operate in this configuration until 4 November 2021, when trains on the Padang Rengas-Bukit Mertajam Line were made to terminate at Butterworth again, thereby making Butterworth, Bukit Tengah and Bukit Mertajam interchange stations between the two lines.

The Northern Sector took on its current form with the extension of the Padang Rengas-Bukit Mertajam Line beyond Padang Rengas to Ipoh, with two intermediate stations Kuala Kangsar and Sungai Siput on 16 September 2023.

=== Southern Sector ===
==== Former Seremban–Gemas Shuttle ====
On 1 October 2015, KTM announced the introduction of the Seremban–Gemas shuttle service for the Seremban–Gemas stretch, following the completion of the electrification and double-tracking of the route on 30 October 2013. The route was operated by KTM Class 83 and served the intermediate stations of Senawang, Sungai Gadut, Rembau, Pulau Sebang/Tampin and Batang Melaka. At Seremban station, passenger would continue their journey on the then Seremban Line towards Kuala Lumpur and Tanjung Malim.

On 20 June 2016, the shuttle service was cut short and made to terminate at Pulau Sebang/Tampin station instead, no longer serving Gemas and Batang Melaka stations. On 11 July 2016, the shuttle service was fully absorbed into the Seremban Line, which was subsequently modified and renamed into the Batu Caves-Pulau Sebang Line.

==== Southern Shuttle ====
On 14 March 2024, it was announced that the Southern Sector line will be reintroduced as a commuter service from Gemas to Paloh, and Paloh to JB Sentral, once the electrification and double tracking project along that route is completed.

On 22 July 2025, KTM announced plans to introduce Komuter services on the Kempas Baru–Pasir Gudang branch line, which is currently a freight-only route serving the Johor Port in anticipation of the higher passenger traffic expected from the upcoming Johor Bahru–Singapore Rapid Transit System. The service is expected to begin in 2026. By January 2026, three sites were proposed for the line's intermediate stations — Taman Daya, Bandar Seri Alam, and Kampung Pasir Putih.

On 16 June 2026, the new Southern Shuttle officially commenced serving two routes; between Kulai and JB Sentral with an intermediate stop at Kempas Baru, and between Kempas Baru and Pasir Gudang. Kempas Baru serves as an interchange between the two lines as well as providing a connection KTM ETS and KTM Intercity services.

== Stations ==
The Komuter service was largely built from existing lines, with minor alterations (i.e. removal or abandonment of lines and replacement of wooden sleepers with concrete ones). Relevant station platforms were added and heightened to allow easier access to Komuter trains travelling in both directions.

Major pre-independence stations, including Kuala Lumpur, Klang, Port Klang and Seremban were retained and upgraded to support the Komuter services. Smaller, wood-based stations and halts along the line that were built at around the same time were either demolished and replaced by modern brick-and-concrete counterparts, or simply abandoned if not preserved (Taiping and Alor Setar stations of the Northern Sector were among the wood-based stations that were preserved and repurposed). The only exception to the rule is the old Sentul station, which remained in service years after KTM Komuter's launch, albeit with a replacement platform.

The layouts and sizes of the new station buildings, since the launch of the service in 1995, vary by location but are generally divided into two classes:

- Railway halts, consisting of a small single-storey structure with only ticket counters (a ticket booth, ticket machines and faregates). The stations are usually placed along straightforward dual tracks.
- Medium-sized and single-storey stations, housing both the ticket counters and station offices, and typically stationed along three or more tracks. Such stations are typically intended to support additional responsibilities, such as managing railway signals, controlling railroad switches and handling goods services. The stations themselves are similar in design to the original wood-based stations along the line with slight hints of Western colonial designs (arches, wooden-and-glass windows and wooden doors), but are larger and modernised.

Some stations also have parking facilities.

The platforms of the 1995 stations are virtually standardised, down to the design of the passenger semicircle-crossed shelters, the use of similarly styled foot crossings to link all platforms, and the diamonds-based brickwork of the platforms.

Depending on the number of patrons through the years, each station has undergone upgrades or expansions that consist of either increasing the number of ticket counters or opening new facilities for use by passengers or railway staff. Taller, wider canopies were erected on the platforms of most stations to replace narrower, original versions in 2006 and 2007. The pace of the upgrades varies by location.

During the 2000s, new stations such as the Mid Valley appeared with more modern designs, consisting primarily of high, curved canopies above the entire platforms. Certain new stations along dual tracks are also included with facilities typically reserved for medium-sized stations, such as the Rasa. The KL Sentral station, however, is housed under the concrete base of the Stesen Sentral transport hub, and is stark and utilitarian in design.

== Rolling stock ==
The original Komuter rolling stock consisted of three versions of three-car Electric multiple units (EMU) added over the course of three years, beginning in 1994. The EMUs were the first in KTM's history. All Komuter EMUs operated in multiple-unit formation, drawing power from an overhead single-phase 25 kV AC 50 Hz catenary supply, with two driving cars and 1 trailer car in between. The EMUs were state-of-the-art, with remote-controlled pneumatic doors, Automatic Train Protection (ATP), train data recorder, wheel-slip control, GTO/IGBT traction electronics and regenerative braking. Up to the point of their introduction, no other KTM motive power used these modern train control systems.

Designated by KTM as "Class 8x"s, the EMUs wore yellow, blue and grey livery, a departure from the predominantly grey livery that KTM adopted on other locomotives and passenger coaches at the time. A handful of EMUs included full advertisements on the sides of their cars.

The original Komuter fleet consisted of the following models:

Class	Image	In service	Cars per Set	On order	Manufacturer	Remarks
Class 81 EMUs		4	3	N/A	(Austria) - (Hungary) Jenbacher Transport in (1994/1995)	Designations EMU 01 to EMU 18. The trains were taken out of service in 2012, but four have returned to service after many years of refurbishment. EMU 09 has been spotted running on the Southern Sector.
Class 82 EMUs		0	3	N/A	(South Africa) Union Carriage & Wagon in (1996/1997)	Designations EMU 41 to EMU 62. All of the trainset are retired from service due to lack of spare parts and closure of the company's international division.
Class 83 EMUs		14	3	N/A	(South Korea) Hyundai Precision (now Hyundai Rotem) in (1996/1997)	Designations EMU 19 to EMU 40. 14 sets remain in service, most of them currently serve the KTM Komuter Northern Sector. Several sets were repainted with new livery for the KL Sentral–Terminal Skypark Line. EMU 25 serves all KTM Komuter sectors (Klang Valley, Skypark Link, and Northern, currently serving in Southern Sector) for now, using hybrid locomotive-hauled systems.

The Class 81-83 suffered from more mechanical problems as they aged, especially the Class 81 and Class 82 EMUs, which had poor reliability. The manufacturers of both classes had gone bankrupt since the trains were built, hence spare parts became unavailable. On paper, the number of serviceable units in 2010 stood at 53 out of the original 62, although there are reports of far fewer trains. Ultimately, five Class 81 sets were refurbished, albeit with new motors from Hyundai instead of Jenbacher. All Class 82s were taken out of service.

In 2012, the new six-car Class 92 EMUs were introduced, replacing most of the Class 81-83 series in the central sector. A handful of the Class 81-83 EMUs remain, either on the KL Sentral-Terminal Skypark Line or on Sentul-Batu Caves shuttle, but many have been reallocated to the Northern Sector. In 2025, Transport Minister Anthony Loke announced that 12 three-car sets will be constructed for the KTM Komuter Northern Sector, having issued the Letter of Acceptance to CRRC Rolling Stock Centre (Malaysia) Sdn Bhd.

Class	Image	In service	Cars per Set	On order	Manufacturer	Remarks
Class 92 EMUs		35	6	N/A	(China) Zhuzhou Electric Locomotives Co Ltd	Most sets currently serve the central sector. Several sets are servicing the Padang Besar–Butterworth Line in the northern sector.
Class 84 EMUs		N/A	3	12	(China) CRRC Zhuzhou Electric Locomotives Co Ltd	To be deployed at KTM Komuter Northern Sector. Expected for delivery in early 2027. The first set (EMU63) arrived in Malaysia on 14th August 2026, and will undergo Fault-Free Run before entering passenger service. 11 other sets will be assembled locally at CRRC in Batu Gajah.
Unknown EMU class		N/A	3	10		To be deployed at KTM Komuter Southern Sector.

== Ticketing ==
Beginning 10 September 2018, all services abolished the cash ticketing system, and cashless ticketing methods were made compulsory.

Currently, passengers travelling on KTM Komuter may use the following ticketing options:

- Mobile ticket or MyRail Life Travel Pass(QR code) via KTMB Mobile app
- Touch 'n Go card
- Ticket Vending Machines (cashless payment via credit/debit cards or E-wallets only)
- Ticketing counters at stations
- Debit or Credit cards
- NFC based mobile payment system (Apple Pay, Google Wallet, Samsung Pay)

When transferring between lines in a specific sector (except for the KL Sentral-Terminal Skypark Line), passengers need only to purchase a ticket to their destination once, or tap in and tap out once each throughout their journey. Ridership for primary and secondary school students, and person with disabilities are free of charge via MyRail Life Travel Pass.

== Ridership ==
Ridership statistics published by the Ministry of Transport are for all KTM Komuter services. No separate statistics for the individual lines are published. Statistics before 1999 are also not available. (Note: KTM Komuter Selatan ridership data in the APAD report refers to southern segments of KTM Komuter Central Sector and hence is not counted towards the KTM Komuter Southern Sector's ridership.)

KTM Komuter Ridership
Year	Sector	Ridership	Annual Ridership	Change (%)	Note
2026	Central	6,508,796	11,586,213		KTM Komuter Southern Sector began operations on 16 June 2026
2026	Southern	24,987	11,586,213		KTM Komuter Southern Sector began operations on 16 June 2026
2026	Northern	5,052,430	11,586,213		KTM Komuter Southern Sector began operations on 16 June 2026
2025	Central	10,230,638	16,647,685	▼ -9.9	
2025	Northern	6,417,047	16,647,685	▼ -9.9	
2024	Central	12,484,751	18,473,715	▲1.9	
2024	Northern	5,988,964	18,473,715	▲1.9	
2023	Central	13,502,856	18,126,596	▲25.1	
2023	Northern	4,623,740	18,126,596	▲25.1	
2022	Central	11,161,821	14,487,105	▲145.6	
2022	Northern	3,325,284	14,487,105	▲145.6	
2021	Central	4,583,229	5,897,764	▼ -49.9	Enforcement of the Malaysian movement control order
2021	Northern	1,314,535	5,897,764	▼ -49.9	Enforcement of the Malaysian movement control order
2020	Central	9,335,066	11,772,022	▼ -61.2	Enforcement of the Malaysian movement control order
2020	Northern	2,436,956	11,772,022	▼ -61.2	Enforcement of the Malaysian movement control order
2019	Central	23,953,774	30,327,420	▼ -5.3	
2019	Northern	6,373,646	30,327,420	▼ -5.3	
2018	Central	26,618,847	32,036,271	▼ -14.1	
2018	Northern	5,417,424	32,036,271	▼ -14.1	
2017	Central	33,265,198	37,273,916	▼ -10.1	
2017	Northern	4,008,718	37,273,916	▼ -10.1	
2016			41,469,000	▼ -16.5	
2015			49,690,000	▲5.8	KTM Komuter Northern Sector began operations on 11 September 2015
2014			46,957,000	▲6.9	
2013			43,942,000	▲26.1	
2012			34,847,000	▼ -1.9	
2011			35,510,000	▲1.5	
2010			34,995,000	▲0.9	
2009			34,683,000	▼ -5.1	
2008			36,557,000	▼ -1.1	
2007			36,959,000	▲5.7	
2006			34,975,000	▲13.1	
2005			30,935,000	▲13	
2004			27,380,000	▲11.1	
2003			24,645,000	▲11.6	
2002			22,084,000	▲5.5	
2001			20,929,000	▲9.3	
2000			19,154,000	▲11.6	
1999			17,168,000	-	

== Incidents and accidents ==
- On the evening of 3 March 2004, a Seremban-bound KTM Komuter train on the Seremban Line collided with the rear of another Komuter train facing the same direction, which had been waiting at a signal between Tiroi and Seremban for five minutes. Forty passengers were injured, but no deaths were reported. The accident was ascribed to the faulty signal light (struck by lightning) that stopped the earlier train, though the driver of the rear-ending train is reported to have run a red light into the section occupied by the rear-ended train. The resulting crash disrupted KTM Komuter services along the line for a day. This is so far the worst accident involving the KTM Komuter service.
- On 2 March 2007, a crane fell onto a KTM Komuter train track near Shah Alam station on the Port Klang Line, stranding about 10,000 passengers and cancelling 40 trips. Alternative transport services were provided.
- On 25 May 2007, a person was killed after he was hit by a KTM Komuter train while crossing the tracks illegally. Deaths in this manner have occurred along Komuter lines before.
- On 27 February 2008, overhead power cables between Subang Jaya and Petaling stations of the Port Klang Line broke, causing all train services from Sentul to terminate at Petaling, unable to move further.
- On 22 October 2009, a multipurpose vehicle plunged onto the railway track as it was heading from Kuala Lumpur towards Subang Jaya. Train services were disrupted, and the vehicle was towed away 3 hours after the accident.
- On 4 February 2013, A woman in her 50s was run over by a commuter train at Taman Wahyu station. The victim was said to have been dragged 50m along the track in the incident.
- On 15 February 2013 at 23:00, an out-of-service KTM Class 92 SCS 20 train derailed near Shah Alam station while returning to the Sentul depot for maintenance. No one was injured. The train was heavily damaged and was subsequently written off.
- On 1 November 2013, a 3-coach KTM Class 83 derailed near Rawang station while moving through a track switch. No one was hurt in the incident. The two rear coaches were separated and towed away using a locomotive while the remaining front coach was removed by cranes.
- On 18 September 2017, KTM train services suffered a major disruption after an electrical cable snapped at KM361.76 on the tracks between the Rawang and Kuang stations, causing closure to both of the rail tracks.

== Gallery ==
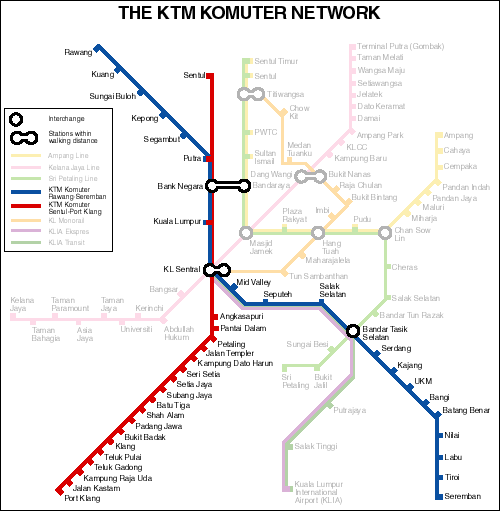
KTM Komuter network, Klang Valley sector

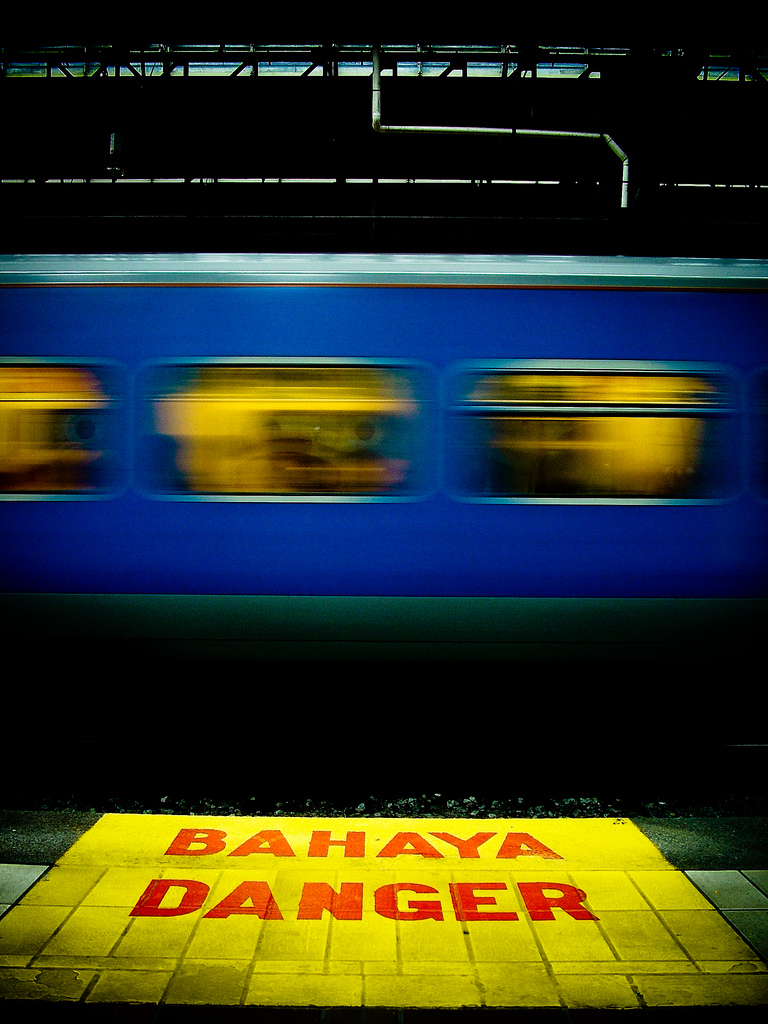
A train passing by a danger sign on the platform

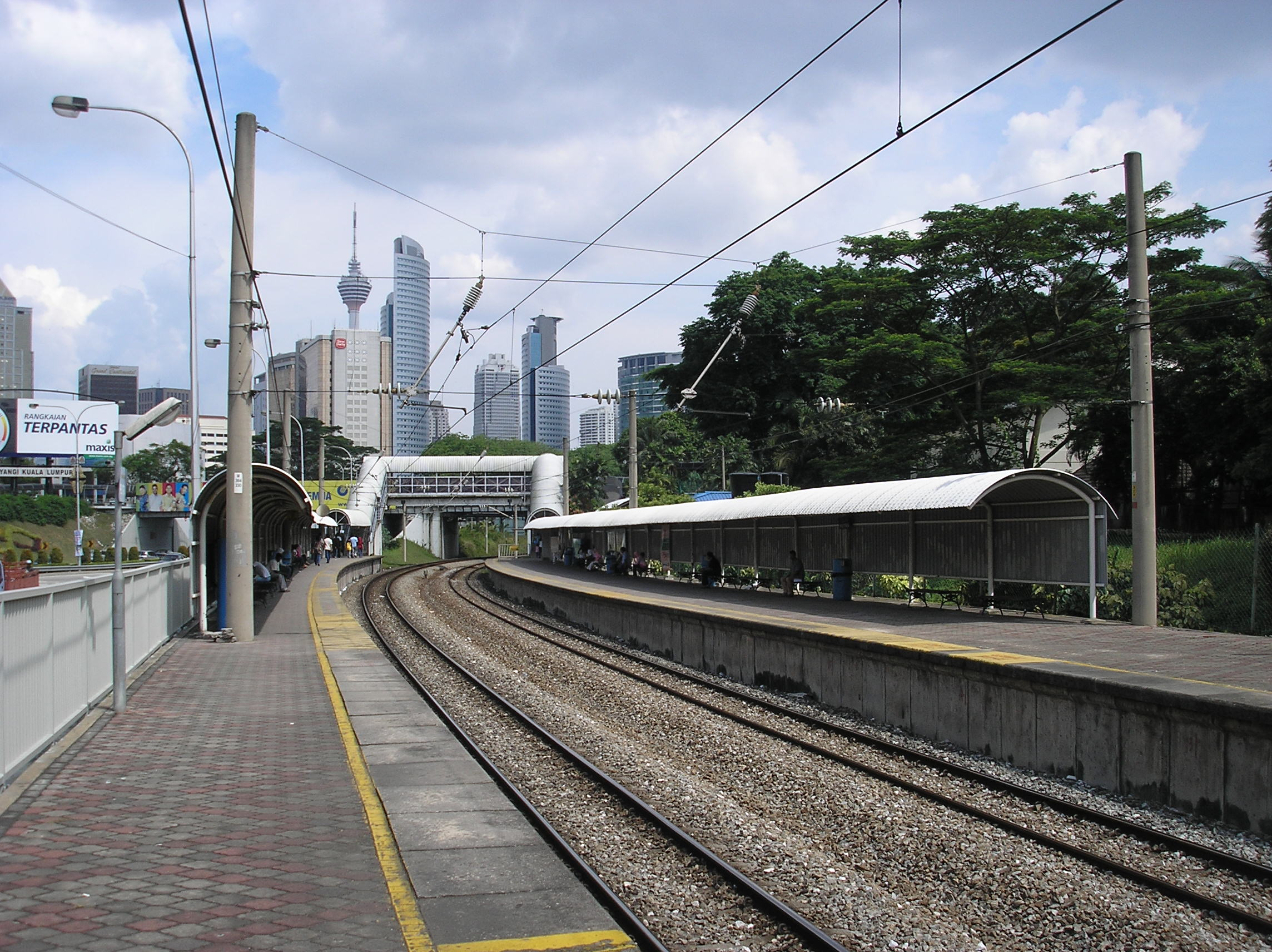
Putra Komuter station, an example of early design of a station prior to canopy upgrade

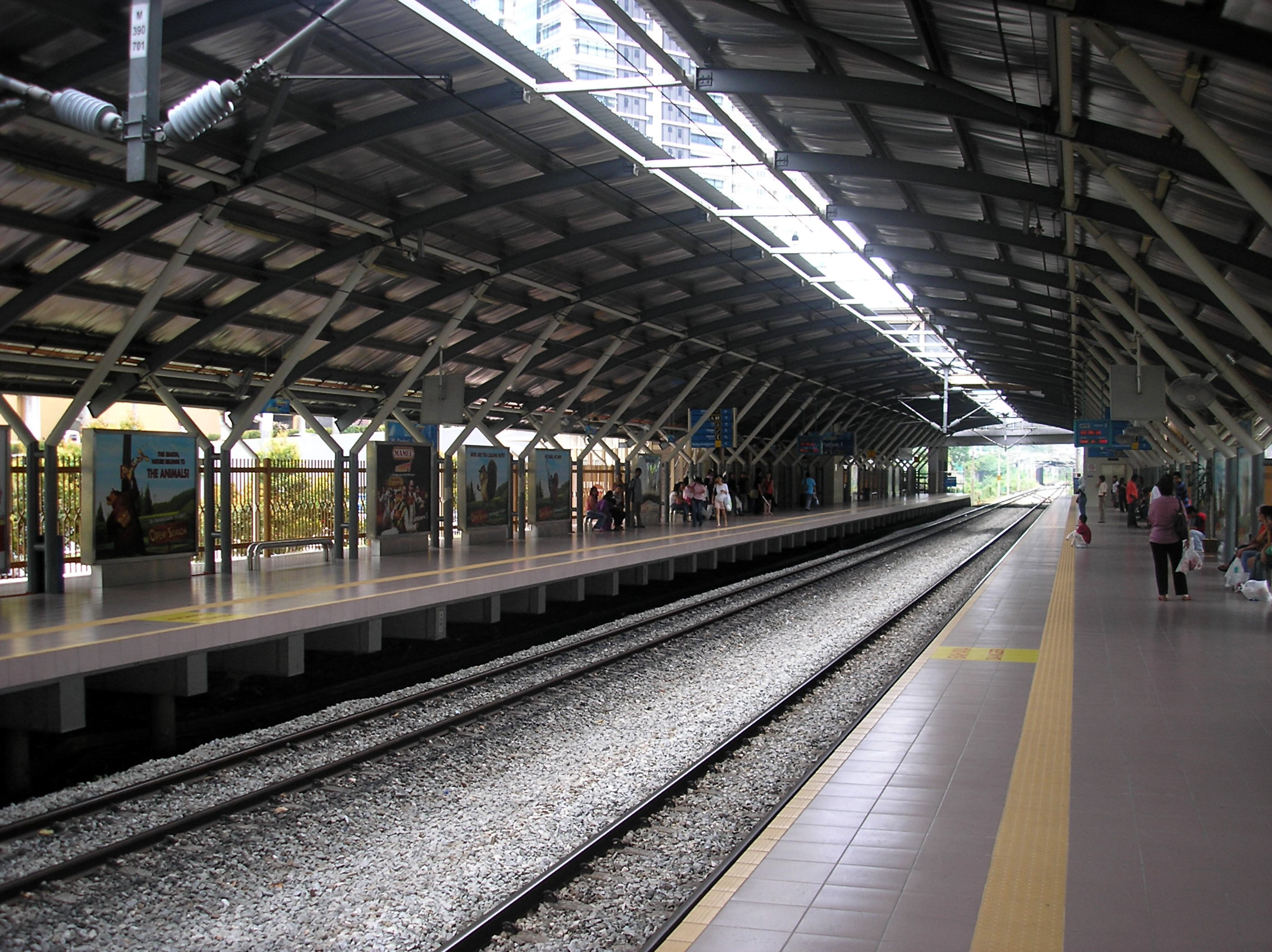
Mid Valley Komuter station, showing the new canopy roof

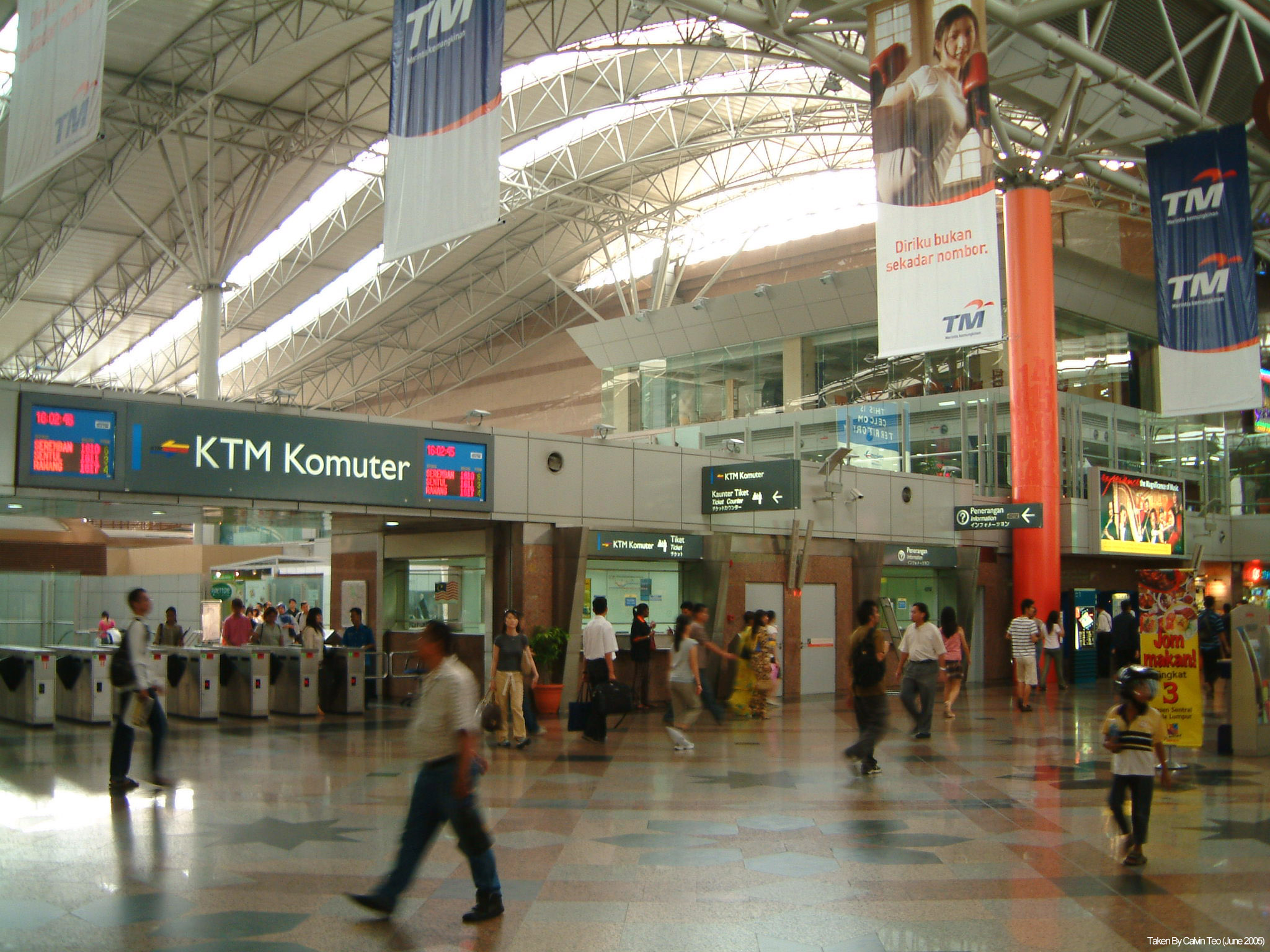
KTM Komuter in KL Sentral

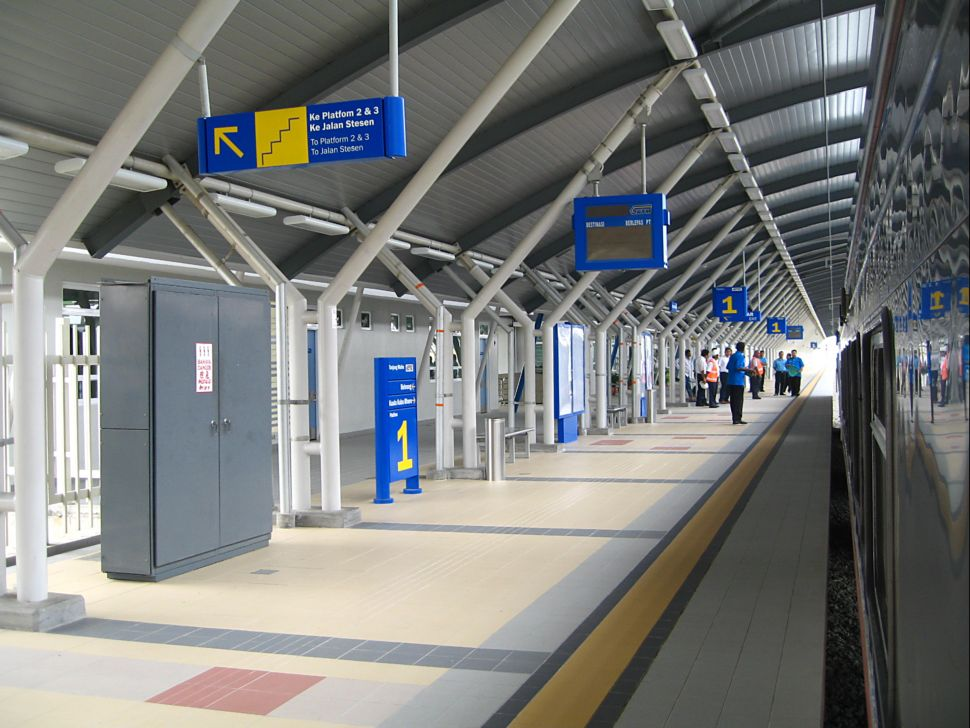
The Tanjung Malim railway station is the northern terminus of the KTM Komuter network.

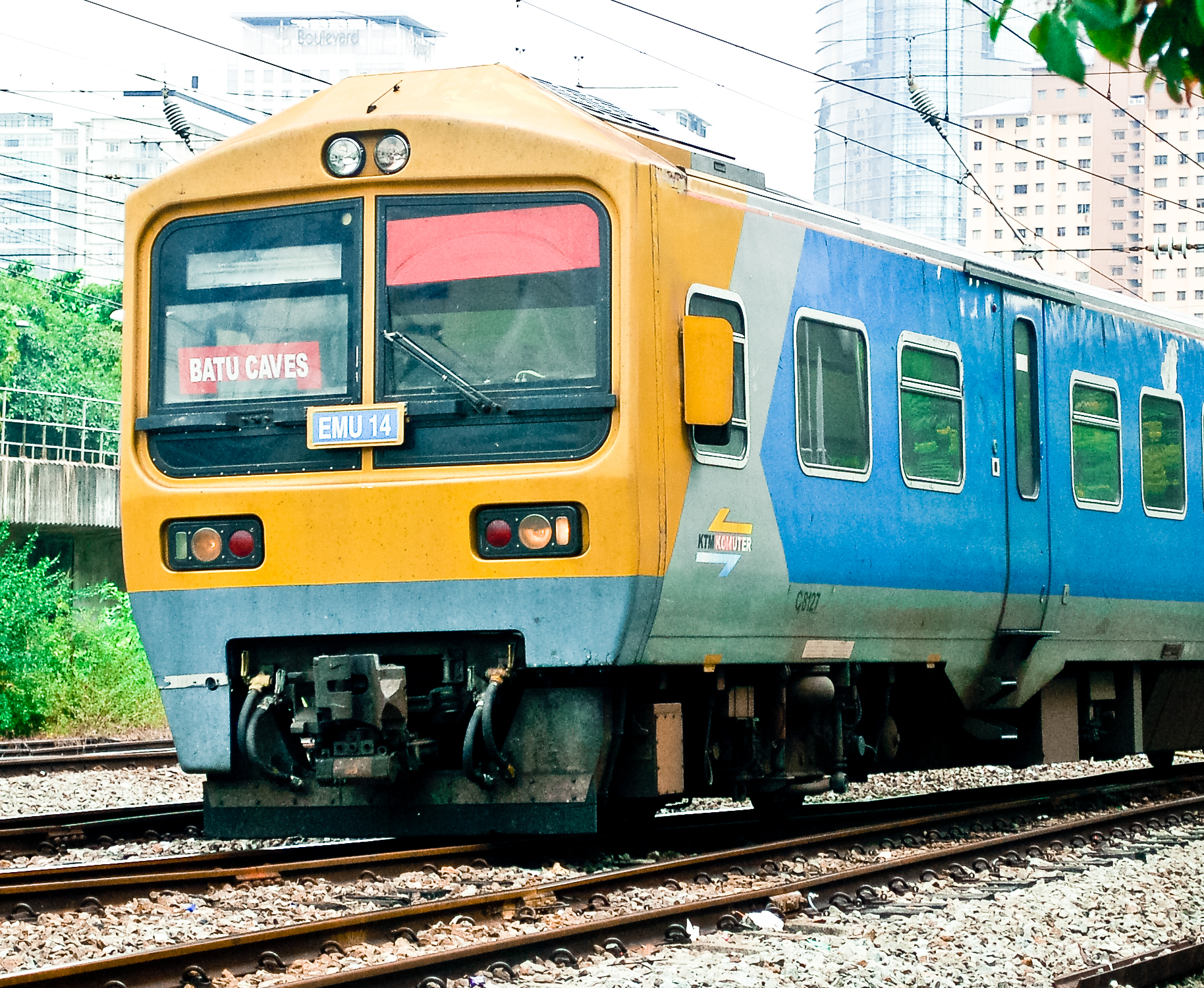
The Class 81 (EMU14), one of the first batch of all EMU in Malaysia that were made at Jenbach, Austria.

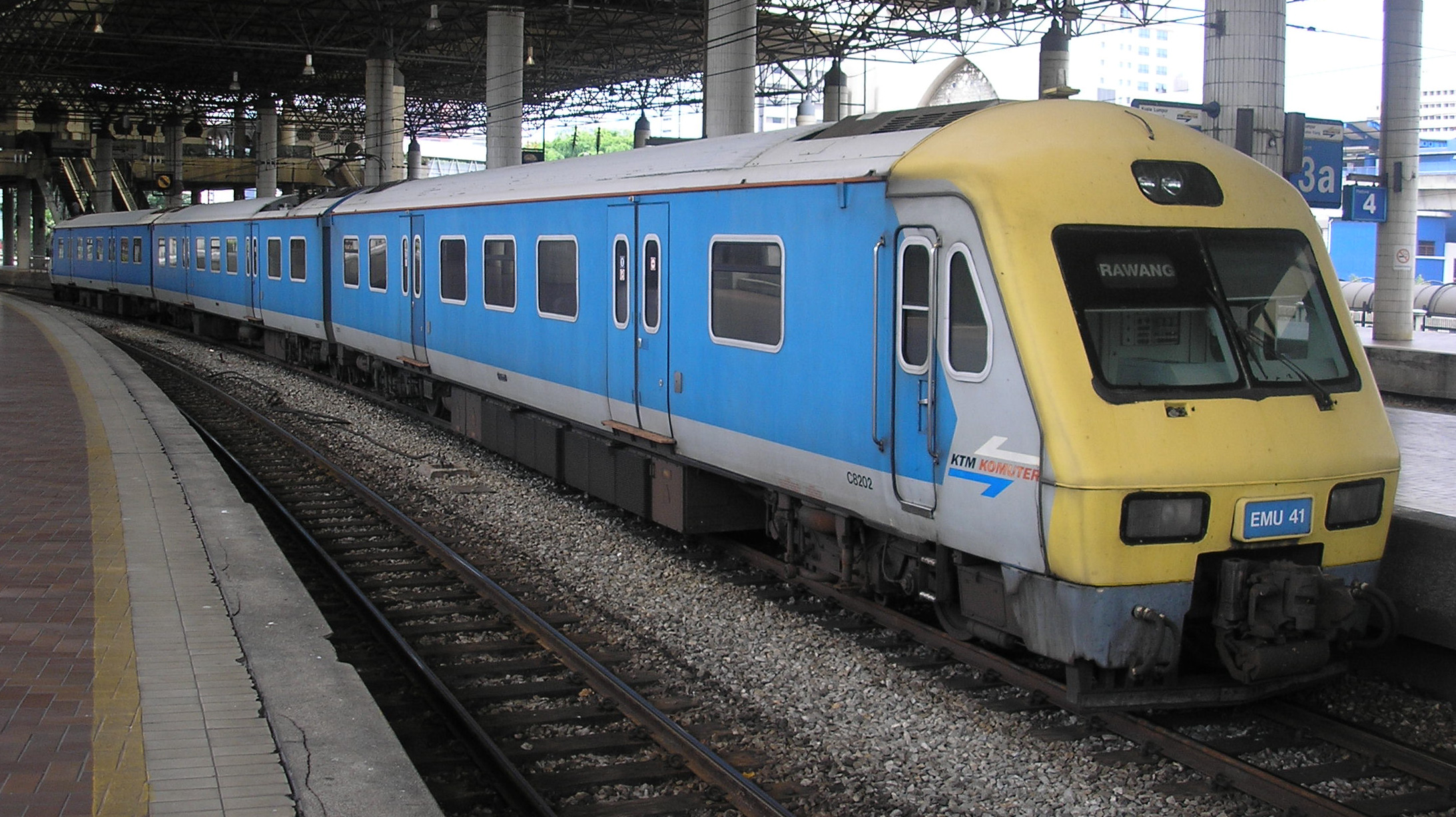
The Class 82 (EMU41, the last batch, built in South Africa) train, which has been abandoned and retired due to closure of the company and lack of parts.

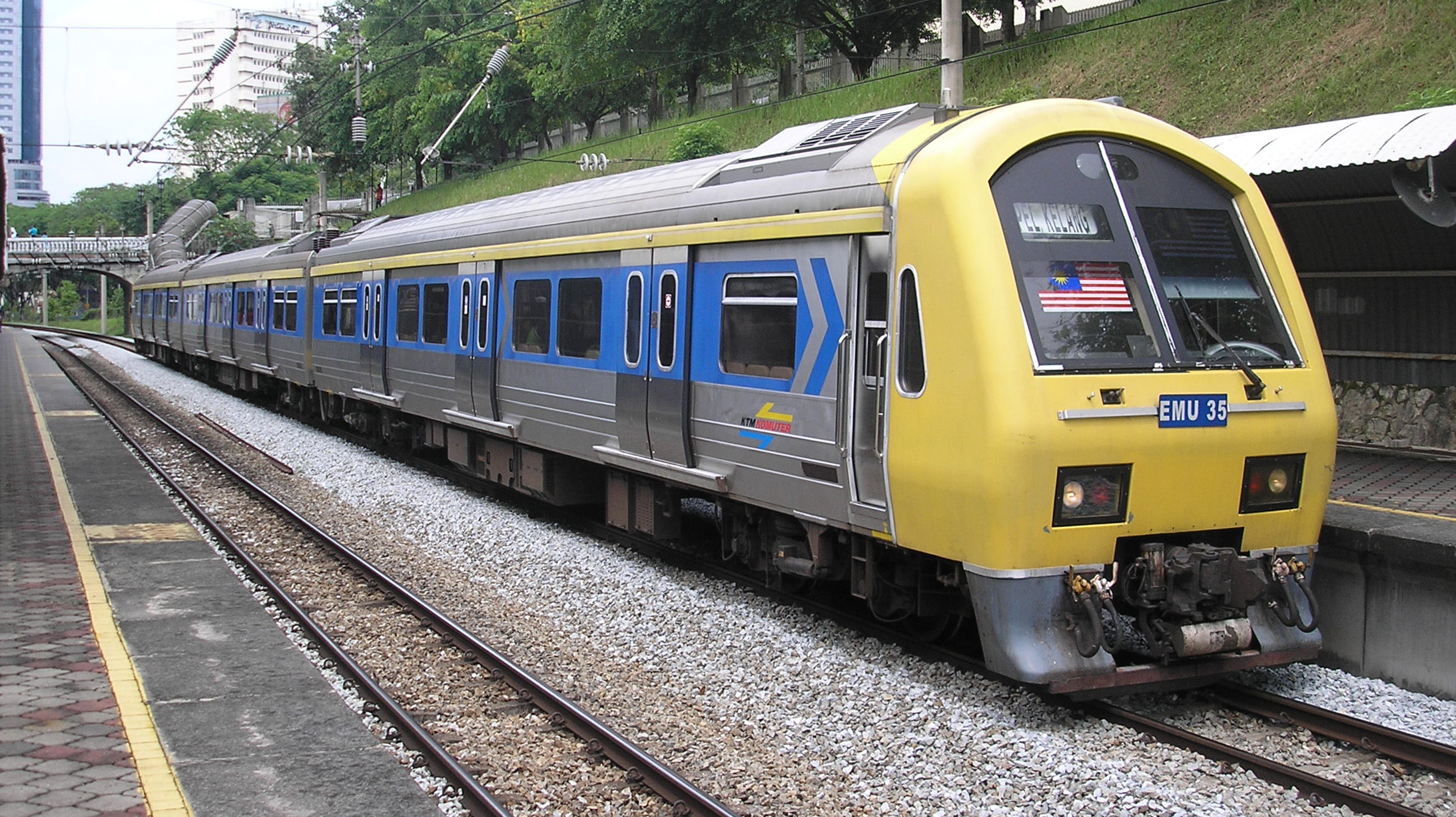
The Class 83 (EMU30, the second batch) built in South Korea, is still in use today for Ipoh-Butterworth-Padang Besar service.

== See also ==
- Keretapi Tanah Melayu
  - KTM Intercity & KTM ETS
    - KTM East Coast Line
    - KTM West Coast Line
  - KTM Komuter
    - Batu Caves–Pulau Sebang Line
    - Tanjung Malim–Port Klang Line
    - KL Sentral–Terminal Skypark Line
    - Padang Besar–Butterworth Line
    - Butterworth–Ipoh Line
    - Paloh–JB Sentral Line
    - Kempas Baru–Pasir Gudang Line
- Rail transport in Malaysia
- Railway electrification in Malaysia
- Public transport in Kuala Lumpur
