= Rawang railway station =

Train station in Gombak, Selangor, Malaysia

Rawang

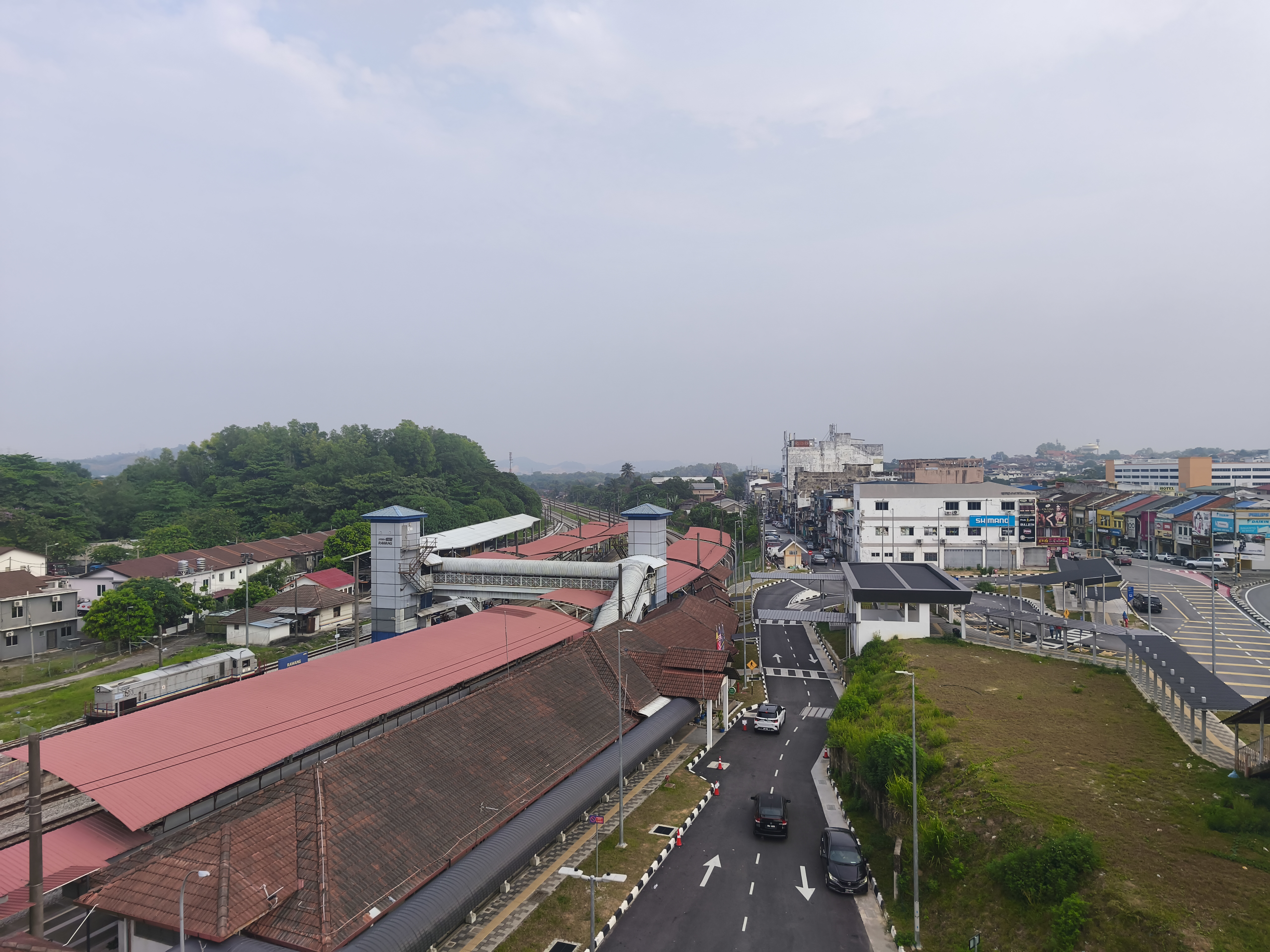
- Rawang Railway Station from multistorey carpark

General information
- Other names: Malay: راوڠ (Jawi); Chinese: 万挠; Tamil: ரவாங்
- Location: Rawang, Selangor, Malaysia.
- Coordinates: 3°19′08″N 101°34′30″E
- Owner: Keretapi Tanah Melayu
- Line: West Coast Line
- Platforms: 1 side platform & 1 island Platform
- Tracks: 3

Construction
- Parking: Available, pay.

Other information
- Station code: KA10

History
- Opened: 1892
- Rebuilt: 1995
- Electrified: 1995

Services
Preceding station	Keretapi Tanah Melayu (Komuter)	Following station
Serendah towards Tanjung Malim	Tanjung Malim–Port Klang Line	Kuang towards Port Klang
Preceding station	Keretapi Tanah Melayu (ETS)	Following station
Tanjung Malim towards Padang Besar	Padang Besar–JB Sentral (Gold)	Sungai Buloh towards Johor Bahru Sentral
Tanjung Malim towards Ipoh	KL Sentral–Ipoh (Gold)	Sungai Buloh towards Kuala Lumpur Sentral
Location

The Rawang railway station is a commuter rail train station located in Rawang, Gombak District, Selangor, Malaysia. It is served by the KTM Komuter's Tanjung Malim–Port Klang Line and two KTM ETS's ETS Gold train services.

It was the northernmost terminus for passenger services on the Rawang–Seremban route since the start of KTM Komuter's services until 2015, when a new Rawang-Port Klang trial route began operating to cater for the KTM double-track upgrading project. In 2016, the Rawang–Port Klang route was merged with the Rawang–Tanjung Malim shuttle service, ending Rawang's role as the northern terminus of the line and forming the current Tanjung Malim-Port Klang Line.

The station built to cater the traffic around the suburbs of Rawang as there were no other commuter or mass transit services in the Klang Valley that stopped here before the arrival of the KTM Komuter.

== Extension ==
On 21 April 2007, a shuttle service between Rawang and Rasa was launched. The service, which extends the KTM Komuter network by 22km, covered three new stations, namely Batang Kali, Serendah and Rasa. This was the first stretch of the problem-prone and much-delayed Rawang–Ipoh electrification and double-tracking project. The shuttle service was extended to Kuala Kubu Bharu on 5 January 2008 and Tanjung Malim on 1 June 2009.
