= Batang Kali railway station =

Railway station in Malaysia

Coordinates: 3°28′06″N 101°38′17″E

Batang Kali

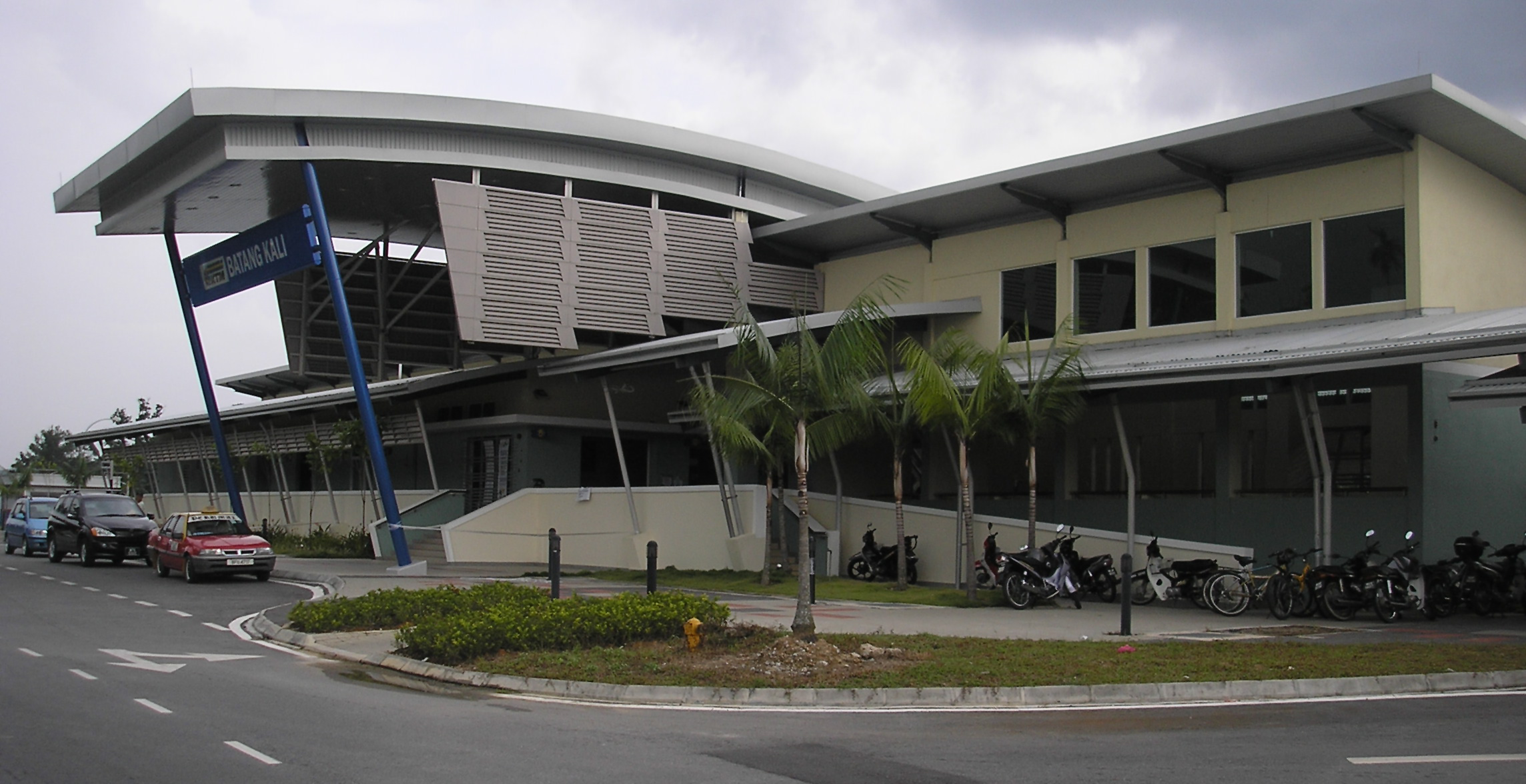
- The main entrance of the Batang Kali station.

General information
- Other names: Malay: باتڠ کالي (Jawi); Chinese: 峇冬加里; Tamil: பத்தாங் காலி
- Location: Batang Kali, Hulu Selangor, Selangor, Malaysia.
- System: KA12 Commuter rail and Inter-city rail station
- Owner: Keretapi Tanah Melayu
- Line: West Coast Line
- Platforms: 2 side platforms
- Tracks: 2
- Connections: Selangor Smart Bus MDHS (HS02) Aerobus Shuttle Service (KTM Batang Kali - Awana Bus Terminal)

Construction
- Parking: Available, free.
- Accessible: Y

Other information
- Station code: KA12

History
- Opened: 21 April 2007

Services
Preceding station	KTM Komuter	Following station
Rasa towards Tanjung Malim	Tanjung Malim–Port Klang Line	Serendah towards Port Klang
Preceding station	ETS	Following station
Tanjung Malim towards Butterworth	Butterworth–Segamat (Gold)	Sungai Buloh towards Segamat

Other services
Preceding station	ETS	Following station
Former ETS service terminated on 1 January 2026
Kuala Kubu Bharu towards Ipoh	KL Sentral–Ipoh (Silver)	Rawang towards KL Sentral
Location

The Batang Kali Komuter station is a Malaysian commuter rail train station located at the northwest of and named after the town of Batang Kali, Hulu Selangor, Selangor. The station was opened on 21 April 2007, alongside Rasa and Serendah stations.

It was the second stop on KTM Komuter's Rawang–Tanjung Malim shuttle service (formerly known as the Rawang–Kuala Kubu Bharu shuttle service) until direct services to Port Klang were introduced in 2016, as part of the Tanjung Malim–Port Klang Line.

The station, as are all the other stations along the shuttle route (except Tanjung Malim), is situated along two tracks with two platforms like most station halts along the KTM Komuter netowkr, but contains facilities normally reserved for medium-to-large stations with three or more tracks. In addition to ticketing facilities and basic amenities, the station contains spaces for administrative occupants, as well as a kiosk and an additional footbridge (fused with a footbridge exclusively for Komuter users) for pedestrians that simply intend to cross the railway lines. The station also includes low-tech support for disabled passengers. The station exits southeast towards a road that passes through Batang Kali town.

The station's two side platforms are designated as Platform 1 (adjoining the main station building at the east, intended for southbound trains) and Platform 2 (at the west, intended for northbound trains).

== Gallery ==
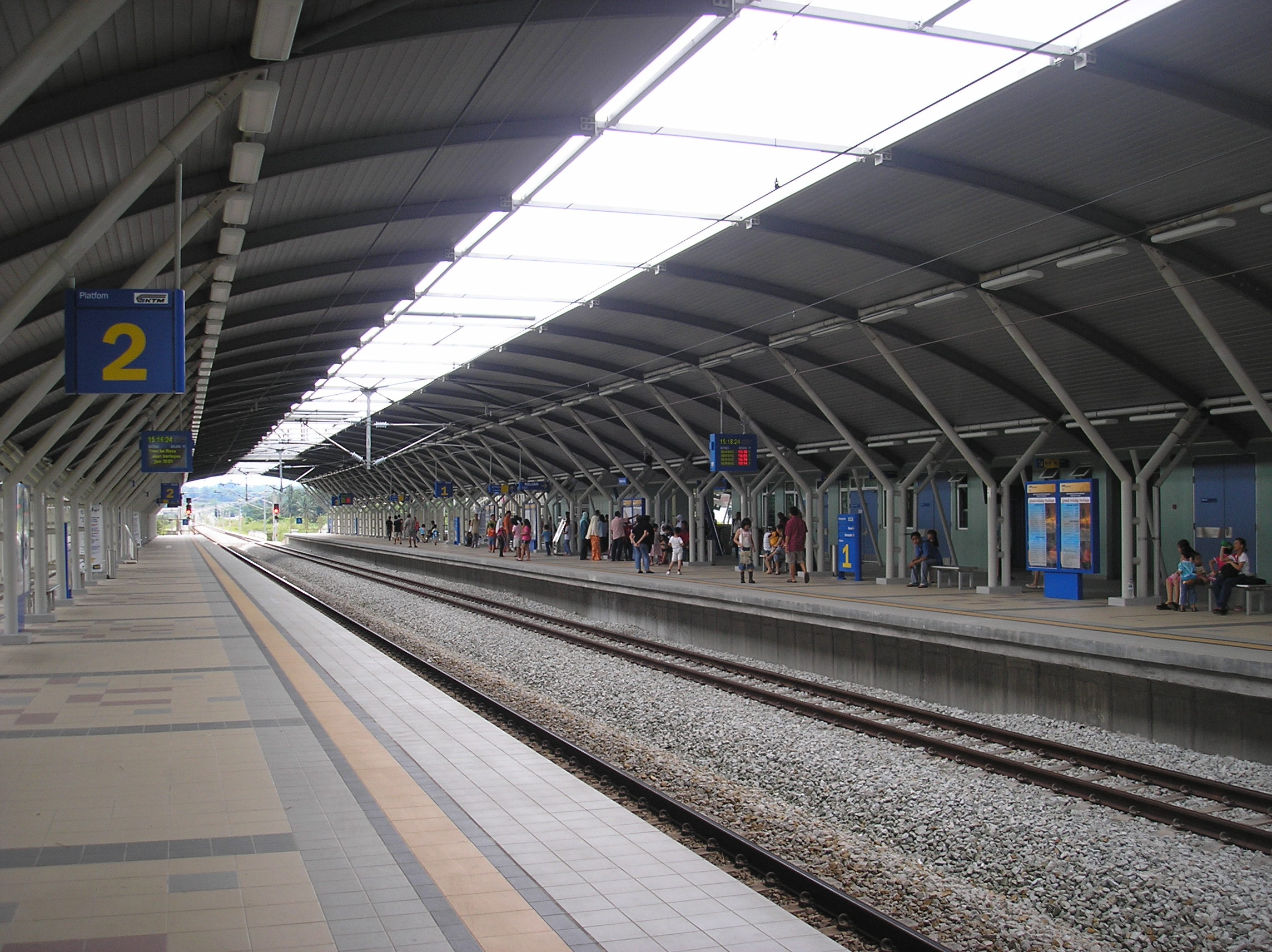
A platform view of the Batang Kali station.
