= Tanjung Malim railway station =

Malaysian train station

Coordinates: 3.68444°N 101.518°E

Tanjung Malim

General information
- Other names: Malay: تنجوڠ ماليم (Jawi); Chinese: 丹绒马林; Tamil: தஞ்சோங் மாலிம்
- Location: Kampung Stesen Tanjong Malim, Tanjung Malim; Perak; Malaysia
- Owner: Railway Assets Corporation
- Operator: Keretapi Tanah Melayu
- Line: West Coast Line
- Platforms: 1 side platform & 1 island platform
- Tracks: 3

Construction
- Parking: Available, free.
- Accessible: Y

Other information
- Station code: KA15

History
- Opened: 1 November 1900
- Rebuilt: 2007
- Electrified: 2007

Services
Preceding station	KTM Komuter	Following station
Terminus	Tanjung Malim–Port Klang Line	Kuala Kubu Bharu towards Port Klang
Preceding station	ETS	Following station
Kampar towards Padang Besar	KL Sentral–Padang Besar (Platinum)	Sungai Buloh towards KL Sentral
Kampar towards Butterworth	KL Sentral–Butterworth (Platinum)	Sungai Buloh towards KL Sentral
Kampar towards Padang Besar	Padang Besar–JB Sentral (Platinum)	Sungai Buloh towards JB Sentral
Kampar towards Butterworth	Butterworth–JB Sentral (Platinum)	Sungai Buloh towards JB Sentral
Tapah Road towards Padang Besar	Padang Besar–JB Sentral (Gold)	Rawang towards JB Sentral
Tapah Road towards Butterworth	Butterworth–Segamat (Gold)	Batang Kali towards Segamat
Slim River towards Ipoh	KL Sentral–Ipoh (Gold)	Rawang towards KL Sentral
Location

The Tanjung Malim railway station is a Malaysian train station stationed at the north eastern side of and named after the town of Tanjung Malim, Perak. The station provides both KTM Komuter and KTM ETS services.

The station was first constructed in 1900 and at the time, served as a halt for KTM Intercity trains. As part of the Rawang-Ipoh double tracking and electrification project, it was rebuilt in 2007 and reopened two years later, on 1 June 2009, as the final stop on the then Rawang–Tanjung Malim shuttle service of the KTM Komuter (formerly known as the Rawang–Kuala Kubu Bharu shuttle service). The service has since been merged with KTM Komuter's main Port Klang Line, making Tanjung Malim the northern terminus of the line. The line was effectively renamed the Tanjung Malim–Port Klang Line and became an integral part of the Klang Valley Integrated Transit System. Tanjung Malim station is currently the northernmost station in the Klang Valley Integrated Transit System as well the KTM Komuter Central Sector system.

On 12 August 2010, KTM ETS services were introduced to the station.

The station, unlike the four other stations along the former shuttle route, is situated along three tracks with three platforms. Its only similarity with the other stations on the shuttle route is that it also contains facilities normally reserved for medium-to-large stations along three or more lines. In addition to ticketing facilities and basic amenities, the station contains spaces for administrative occupants, as well as a kiosk and an additional foot bridge (fused with a foot bridge exclusively for Komuter users) for pedestrians that simply intend to cross the railway lines. The station also includes low-tech support for disabled passengers. The station exits northeast into a branch road that leads west into the town centre of Tanjung Malim.

The Tanjung Malim station's one side platform and one island platform are designated as Platform 1 (adjoining the main station building at the east, intended for southbound trains), Platform 2 (at the west, intended for northbound trains), and Platform 3.

== Location and locality ==
It is located in Tanjung Malim town in the Muallim District of the state of Perak. This station is very close to the Sultan Idris Education University's (UPSI) old campus and is in reasonably near distance to its new campus in Proton City, which also contains Proton's production plant. The Sultan Azlan Shah Polytechnic also is nearby the station.

Apart from Tanjung Malim, the station is the main station serving the town of Behrang Stesen. Despite having its own station, Behrang station is currently not in use and not served by any train services. Tanjung Malim station also serves the bordering towns of the Hulu Selangor District in the state of Selangor like Hulu Bernam town and Kalumpang.

== Train services ==
- ETS Platinum Train No. 9223/9224, 9225/9226 & 9233/9238: KL Sentral-Padang Besar
- ETS Platinum Train No. 9121/9124, 9123/9130, 9133/9136, 9135/9138: KL Sentral-Butterworth
- ETS Platinum Train No. 9323/9326: Butterworth-JB Sentral
- ETS Platinum Train No. 9425/9428: Padang Besar-JB Sentral
- ETS Gold Train No. 9449/9442: JB Sentral-Padang Besar
- ETS Gold Train No. 9343/9352: Segamat-Butterworth
- ETS Gold Train No. 9041/9044, 9045/9052, 9049/9056 & 9055/9058: KL Sentral-Ipoh
- KTM Komuter Tanjung Malim–Port Klang Line services
