= Kuala Lumpur railway station =

Railway station in Malaysia

Kuala Lumpur

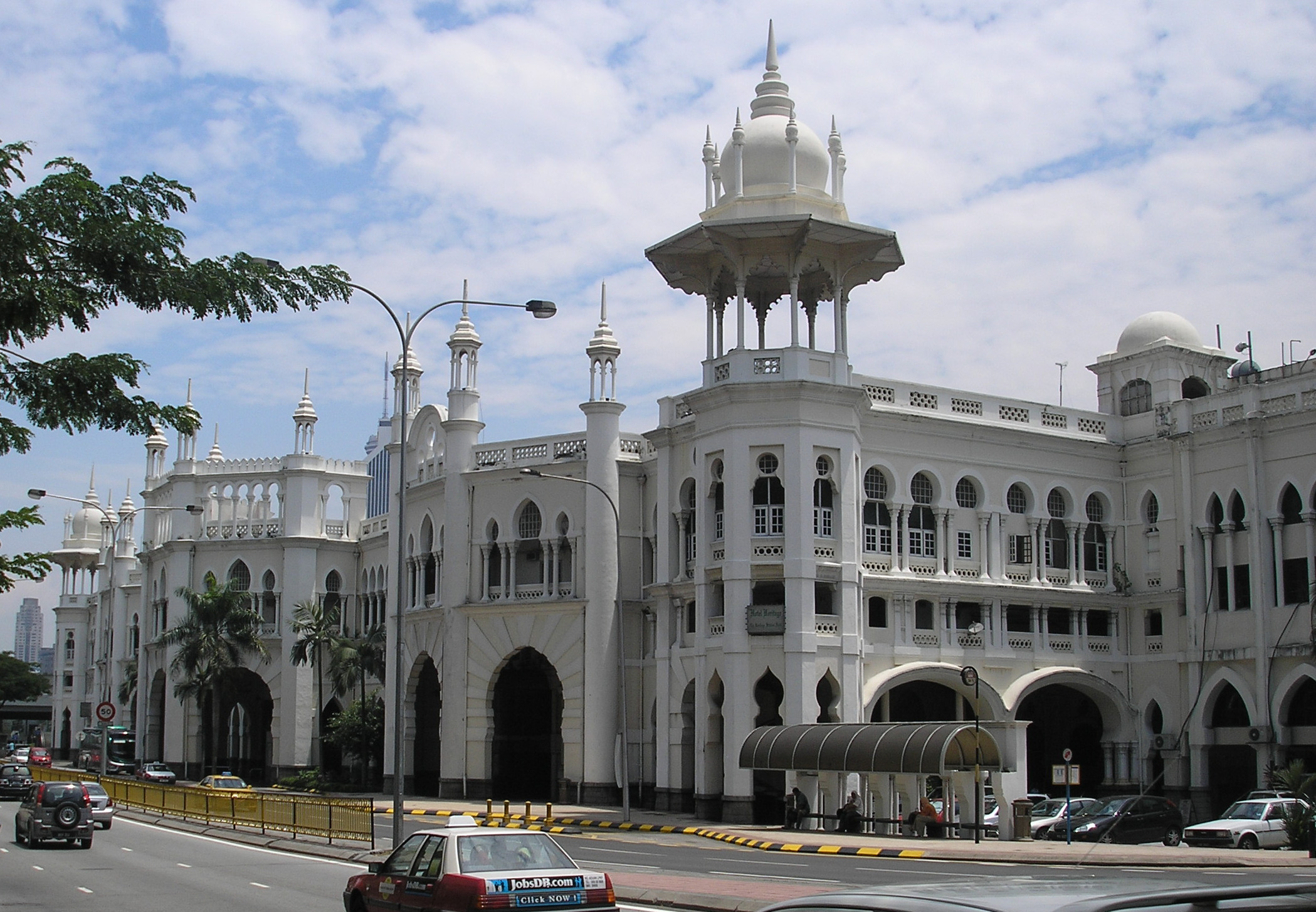
- The 1910 facade of the Kuala Lumpur railway station, as seen towards the northeast.

General information
- Other names: Malay: كوالا لمڤور (Jawi); Chinese: 吉隆坡; Tamil: கோலாலம்பூர்
- Location: Jalan Sultan Hishamuddin; Kuala Lumpur; Malaysia
- Coordinates: 3°8′22″N 101°41′36″E
- Owner: Railway Assets Corporation
- Operator: Keretapi Tanah Melayu
- Line: West Coast Line
- Platforms: 2 side platforms and 1 island platform
- Tracks: 4
- Connections: Connecting station to KJ14 KG16 Pasar Seni via a 400-metre pedestrian walkway

Construction
- Structure type: At-grade
- Parking: Available
- Accessible: Yes
- Architect: Arthur Benison Hubback
- Architectural style: Indo-Saracenic

Other information
- Status: Operational
- Station code: KA02

History
- Opened: 1886 (original building)
- Rebuilt: 1910
- Electrified: 1995
- Original company: Federated Malay States Railways

Services
Preceding station	KTM Komuter	Following station
Bank Negara towards Batu Caves	Batu Caves–Pulau Sebang Line	Kuala Lumpur Sentral towards Pulau Sebang/Tampin
Bank Negara towards Tanjung Malim	Tanjung Malim–Port Klang Line	Kuala Lumpur Sentral towards Port Klang
Preceding station	ETS	Following station
Sungai Buloh towards Padang Besar	KL Sentral–Padang Besar (Express)	Kuala Lumpur Sentral towards KL Sentral
Ipoh towards Butterworth	KL Sentral–Butterworth (Express)	Kuala Lumpur Sentral towards KL Sentral
Batu Gajah towards Ipoh	KL Sentral–Ipoh (Express)	Kuala Lumpur Sentral towards KL Sentral
Sungai Buloh towards Padang Besar	KL Sentral–Padang Besar (Platinum)	Kuala Lumpur Sentral towards KL Sentral
Sungai Buloh towards Butterworth	KL Sentral–Butterworth (Platinum)	Kuala Lumpur Sentral towards KL Sentral
Sungai Buloh towards Padang Besar	Padang Besar–JB Sentral (Platinum)	Kuala Lumpur Sentral towards JB Sentral
Sungai Buloh towards Butterworth	Butterworth–JB Sentral (Platinum)	Kuala Lumpur Sentral towards JB Sentral
Sungai Buloh towards Padang Besar	Padang Besar–JB Sentral (Gold)	Kuala Lumpur Sentral towards JB Sentral
Sungai Buloh towards Butterworth	Butterworth–Segamat (Gold)	Kuala Lumpur Sentral towards Segamat
Kepong Sentral towards Ipoh	KL Sentral–Ipoh (Gold)	Kuala Lumpur Sentral towards KL Sentral
Location

The Kuala Lumpur railway station is a Malaysian railway station located in Kuala Lumpur. Construction began in 1910 and was fully completed in 1917. Replacing an older station on the same site, the station was Kuala Lumpur's railway hub in the city for the Federated Malay States Railways (FMSR) and its successor Keretapi Tanah Melayu (KTM) (English: Malayan Railways), before Kuala Lumpur Sentral station assumed much of its role in 2001. The station is notable for its architecture, adopting a mixture of Eastern and Western designs.

The station is located along Jalan Sultan Hishamuddin', previously known as Victory Avenue, which in turn was part of Damansara Road. The station is located closely to the similarly designed Railway Administration Building, as well as the National Mosque and Dayabumi Complex. The integrated Pasar Seni LRT and MRT station is located 400 metres away, across the Klang River, and is designated as a connecting station with Kuala Lumpur on official transit maps.

== History ==
=== Preceding stations ===
Prior to the construction of the current Kuala Lumpur station, two stations were already operational in the city.

The first railway station in Kuala Lumpur, nicknamed "Resident Station" due to its proximity to the residence of British High Commissioner, was completed and located opposite to the Royal Selangor Club (today Dataran Merdeka) towards the west. Constructed of wood and a nipah palm roof, the station was the first in Kuala Lumpur, linking Kuala Lumpur to Klang (Pengkalan Batu) via the first railway line to connect the city with the rest of the Malay Peninsula (officially inaugurated 22 September 1886).

The second station, Sultan Street, was constructed in 1892 at Foch Avenue (now Tun Tan Cheng Lock Road), close to the present Maybank Tower, the Puduraya bus station and Plaza Rakyat. Its design was based on Resident station, and was stationed along the Pudu railway line, a new line that branched off north from the 1910 station, and connected mines from Ampang to the city. The line was unique in that the initial leg of the track approaching Sultan Street station from the main line was sandwiched between two carriageways of Foch Avenue, cutting across the east side of the city.

Resident station was demolished after construction of the new Kuala Lumpur station was completed. Meanwhile, Sultan Street station was replaced by a smaller terminal station when the tracks at Foch Avenue were dismantled for road traffic, and was demolished after 1960. The Ampang-linked route was partially reused by the LRT Ampang Line.

=== Design, construction and operation ===
Arthur Benison Hubback, a British Architectural Assistant to the Director of Public Works, undertook the design of the station. He incorporated the unique Anglo-Asian architecture in the region on the station's design. The "Neo-Moorish/Mughal/Indo-Saracenic/Neo-Saracenic" style was not uncommon at the time. Similar structures, such as the Sultan Abdul Samad Building (credited to A.C. Norman but largely designed by R.A.J. Bidwell, completed 1897), the Old City Hall (designed by A.B. Hubback, completed 1904) and the Jamek Mosque (designed by A.B. Hubback, completed 1909), pre-date Kuala Lumpur station.

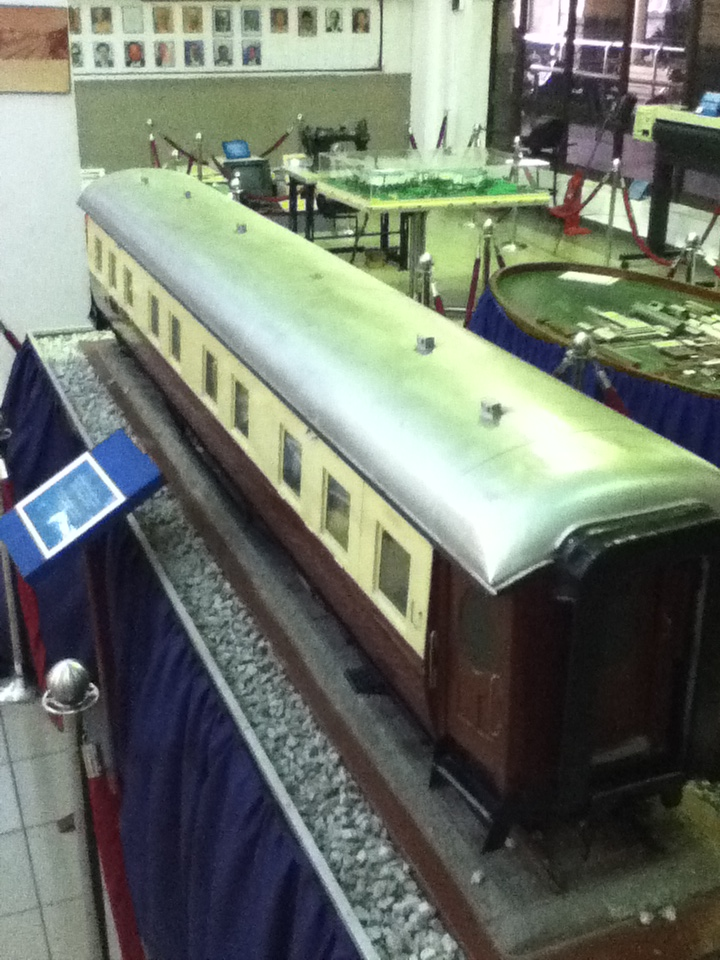
The interior of the station's main hall was refurbished in 1986, which saw some of its original interiors altered and modernised. The area is now used to house exhibits (such as this model of a carriage) after the station was designated a railway museum

At a cost of $23,000, the station was completed and operational on 1 August 1910. After the demolition of Resident Station and the isolation of Sultan Street station, the Kuala Lumpur station became the main railway station in Kuala Lumpur. A railway hotel, the Station Hotel (later renamed the Heritage Station Hotel in 1996), occupied the northern sections of the central station and the upper floors of the station, boasting 170 rooms and an ornate lobby housing Charlies Restaurant & Bar as off the late-2000s. In 1995, access to KTM Komuter services was introduced at the station.

After the diversion of long-distance intercity rail traffic less than a kilometer south to Kuala Lumpur Sentral on 15 April 2001, the original station's importance diminished. While intercity trains continue to pass the station, they no longer stop there, relegating the station to being a stop for KTM Komuter and goods services. As a result of declining passenger traffic and patronage, redundant station facilities, such as staffed ticket counters for intercity services, station offices and rented businesses spaces, were decommissioned or slowly vacated. The Heritage Station Hotel ceased operation in 2011 following declining patronage and a series of mismanaged renovations in the late-2000s; the hotel was briefly reopened in 2014 before closing the same year. While the side platforms of the original station, which have already been raised to a leveled height for smooth embarking and disembarking for intercity coaches, were readily usable from KTM Komuter trains, the configuration of the island platform and access to services in the first 15 years of KTM Komuter's service meant that the original station could not be maximised for use as a transportation stop for electric trains until 2009 renovations raised the last of the original platforms (see platform).

In the months leading up to 31 August 2007, the 50th anniversary of Malaya's independence, various sources reported the transfer of various old railway equipment from a railway warehouse in Klang and a few other locations to the old Kuala Lumpur station. This included a small restored shunter and an antique fire engine. The station was officially reopened on 31 August 2007 as a railway museum (where exhibitions are placed in the main hall and platform of the station), and was mooted to be converted into a cultural centre.

=== Renovations, upgrades and changes ===
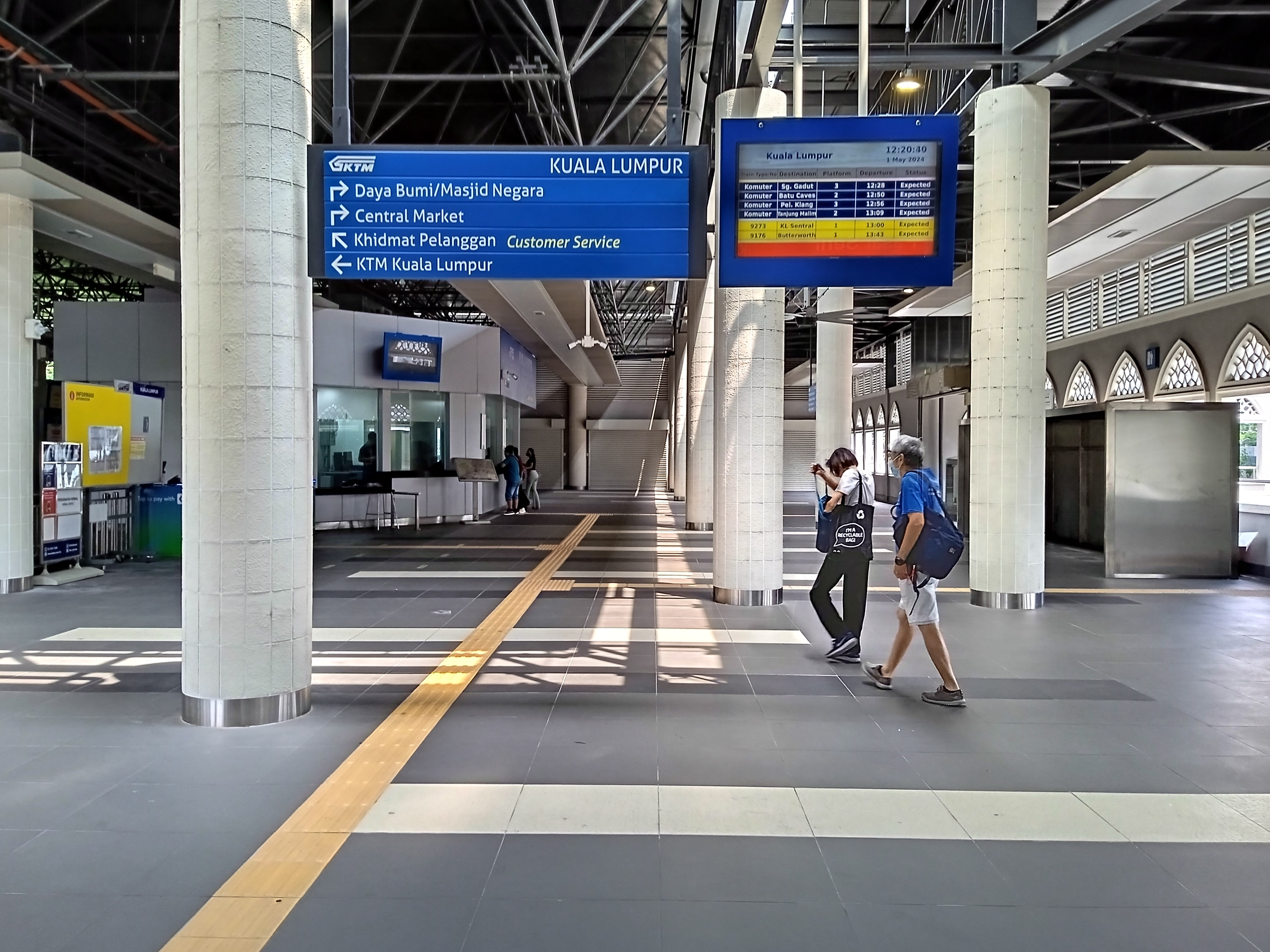
Station concourse

The station has undergone several major changes in its modern history. The north wing was converted for office use by 1967, closing off the arched verandahs with windows. In 1986, the station was more extensively refurbished, with the interior and relevant windows replaced with modern counterparts while the exterior was repaired and preserved, and additional new facilities and buildings, including air-conditioned waiting halls, tourism information counters and snack bars. Parts of the station's original interior designs and frames are still present in the Heritage Station Hotel.

The refurbishment also saw an additional extension built on the south wing of the building, sporting "Raj" stylings that dominates much of the building, and the addition of a frontal façade for the north wing that sports similar architectural elements, masking hints of Western designs from the front. These changes resulted in the building sporting two additional chhatris, two on the corner of each wing, alongside the original four.

Other modifications made onto the old building included the rear wall of the station carved open and extended to accommodate a new station entrance, taxi stops, several office and retail spaces, while additional double-storey retail spaces were constructed over one of the two adjacent frontal access roads to the main building. The 1986 remodelling also saw platform extensions to the north and a new station building in the area, which connected to the Kuala Lumpur General Post Office at the then newly completed Dayabumi Complex (constructed 1982 to 1984).

When KTM Komuter services were launched in 1995 to serve the Rawang-Seremban Route and the Sentul-Port Klang Route, ticket counters and faregates were added to the station, in common with other KTM Komuter stations. The location of KTM Komuter facilities meant that only the newer island platform could be used by KTM Komuter trains (see platform).

After Kuala Lumpur Sentral assumed the responsibility of receiving intercity operations, portions of station facilities designated for intercity services were decommissioned or removed. Limited intercity services were reintroduced to the station following the station's designation as an KTM ETS stop in 2009.

== Platforms ==
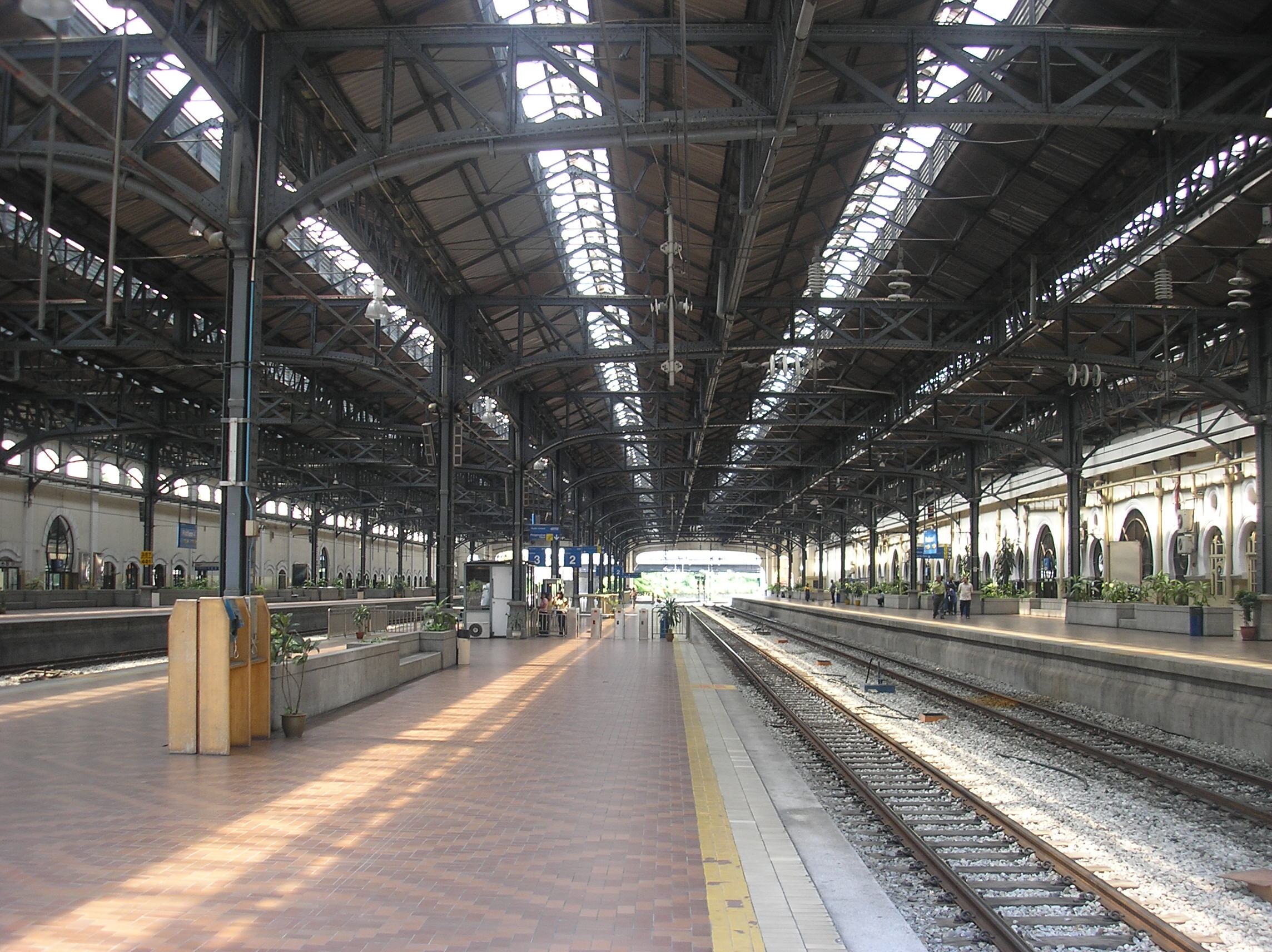
The original platforms of the station (pictured before 2009 platform renovations) retain older architectural elements, such as the large steel-framed pitched-roofed train shed

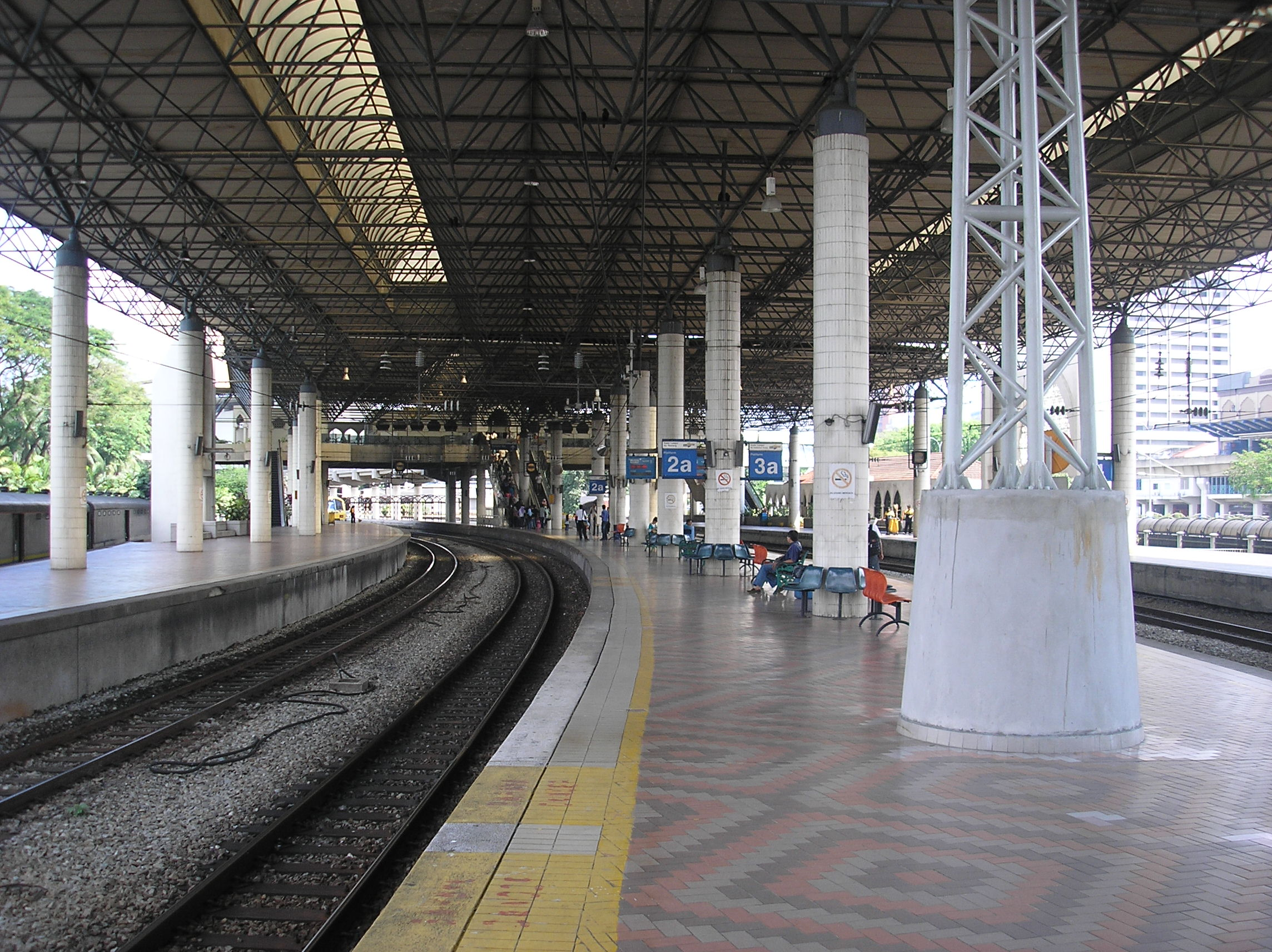
The station extension added during the 1986 renovation takes on modernist design cues with mild inspirations from both the old station and the neighbouring Dayabumi Complex; the mismatched pillar in the foreground is of a 2006 addition of canopy roofs

The station contains three platforms serving four railway tracks, consisting of two side platforms (platforms 1 and 4) on both sides and one island platform (platforms 2 and 3) in between. The numbered designations originally applied to the lengths of both the original and extended platforms from the 1986 renovation until the introduction of KTM Komuter in 1995, when extensions of the original platforms 2 and 3 were assigned additional "a" suffixes, i.e. platforms 2a and 3a, while designations for platforms 1 and 4 remain unchanged.

When the station originally opened in 1910 all platforms were elevated relative to the tracks but were lower than the train floor; all platforms were connected by two tunnels, respectably accessible via stairways for passengers or ramps for trolleys. The 1986 renovation, which added extended platforms elevated to the level of the train floor, had also partially raised the old side platforms to match the height of the 1986 platforms (the tunnel entrances were unaffected by the remodelling as they were located well away from the platform edges), but left the height of the old island platform largely unchanged. As a result, platforms 2 and 3 were unprepared to deal with passengers entering and exiting KTM Komuter trains. In anticipation of the introduction of longer KTM ETS's and KTM Komuter's electric multiple units (EMU), renovation works were conducted in 2009 to raise platforms 2 and 3, removing century-old surface-level tunnel railings and sealing off the stairway exit from one of the tunnels to platforms 2 and 3. Larger canopy shelters connecting the old and new train sheds were also added in 2006.

The platforms have been designated the following functions:

- Until KTM Intercity services moved to Kuala Lumpur Sentral in 2001, platforms 1 and 4 were typically assigned to service KTM Intercity trains. As such, ticket counters for the train services were located within the old and new station buildings. When passenger traffic at the platforms ceased after 2001, the platforms continued to be used to transfer goods to and from trains. The side platforms, like the lobby of the old station building, were open to the public between 2001 and 2011, as KTM Komuter faregates were located at the old island platform rather than within the station building. Following renovations in 2009, the platforms were repurposed for use by the KTM ETS in 2011 with tickets sold at counters located in the former railway fan clubhouse.
- Like the side platforms, the island platforms (platforms 2 and 3, including the 1986 extension) originally served as platforms for KTM Intercity trains services. When KTM Komuter services were introduced in 1995, the 1986 stretch of the island platform was renumbered to platforms 2a and 3a, to be reassigned for trains serving the Rawang-Seremban and Sentul-Port Klang Routes. Due to the still low height of the old island platform, KTM Komuter trains could not stop at the original stretch of platforms 2 and 3, and as such ticket faregates for KTM Komuter services were installed towards the northern end of platforms 2 and 3 to the south as well as the modern exit for platforms 2a and 3a to the north. This also left the original platforms 2 and 3 disused following the discontinuation of intercity services in 2001. With the old island platform raised following the 2009 platform renovation, KTM Komuter and KTM ETS trains could stop along the entire stretch of platforms 2 and 3, moving the southern faregates away from the old platform and into the old station building.

== Architecture ==
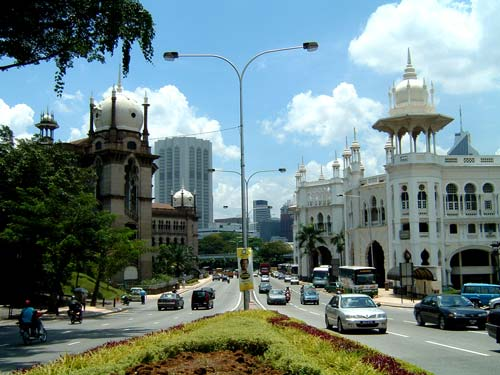
The frontal design of the station is comparable with that of local buildings in the same architectural style, such as the Railway Administration Building directly across the road (left) and various administrative buildings around Merdeka Square

When originally completed in 1917, the Kuala Lumpur railway station consisted of a main terminal building at the front and three platforms serving four railway tracks at the back.

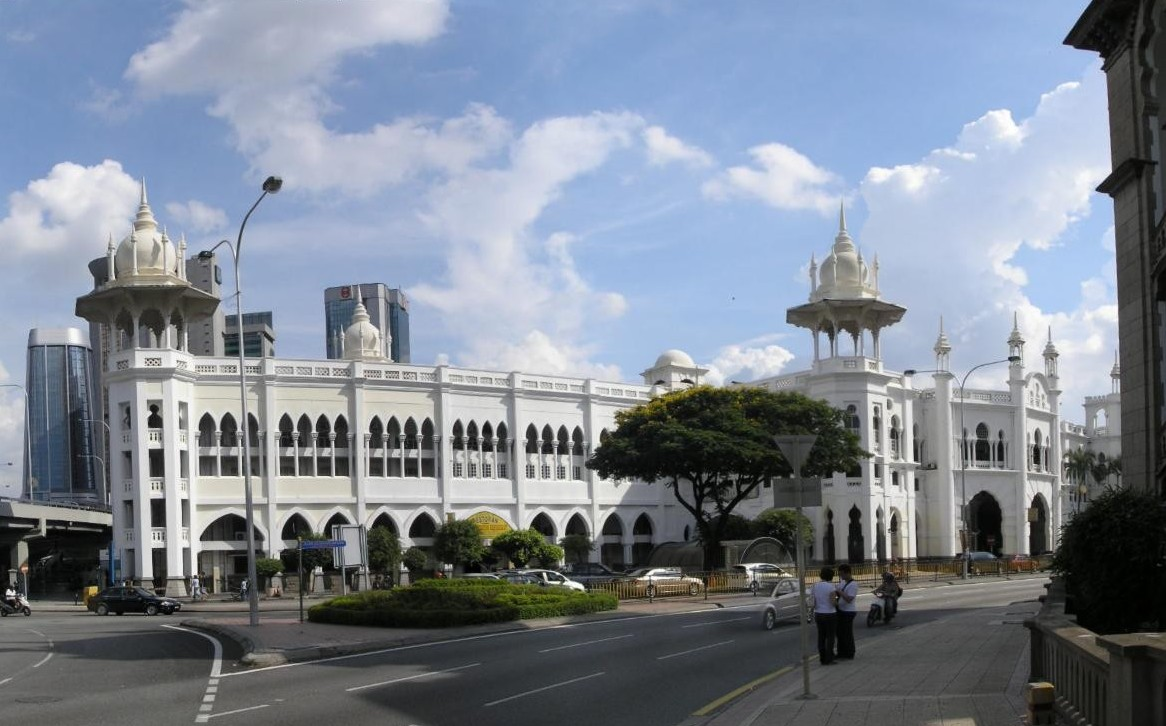
The 1986 renovation also extended the old station's frontal facade, with the existing northern wing masked by a "Raj"-styled edifice

The main structure, which contains a main hall, ticket counters, railway offices and the railway hotel, is primarily designed in a "Raj" styling, mixture of Western and Mughal similar to Moorish Revival or Indo-Saracenic architecture. Dominated by horseshoe and ogee arches, and large chhatris (six originally, with two added later) at the corners of the building accompanying smaller variations at the front, the station is comparable to its contemporaries like the Sultan Abdul Samad Building, surrounding structures constructed around the Merdeka Square and the Railway Administration Building directly across the street. In addition to the main station building, a three-storey addition at the north wing was added early in its operation, adopting more Westernised vernacular designs with surrounding venrendahs and segmental arches of various widths. The façade of the station is completely plastered, as opposed to buildings of similar styles that opt for exposed brickwork, and painted in light colours (usually white or cream) throughout its service.

The platforms are covered by large steel-framed shelters, which were initially shorter during the station's early operation. The roofs were originally glazed, and were partially opened to allow smoke from steam locomotives to escape; corrugated roof sheets served as replacements later in the station's life. The sides of the platforms not adjoining the main building are surrounded by walls constructed in the same style as the main building. The platforms and main building are linked to each other via two underground passageways.

The design of the extended platform for the 1986 refurbishment of the station took a more modernist approach, consisting simply of large concrete pillars supporting a latticed roof and a ticket office on concrete slabs at the north end, suspended two stories above ground. White walls and arches that serve as decorations to the extension mimic design cues from both the old station and the Dayabumi complex. The new extension is also connected to Dayabumi via an elevated walkway.

== Around the station ==
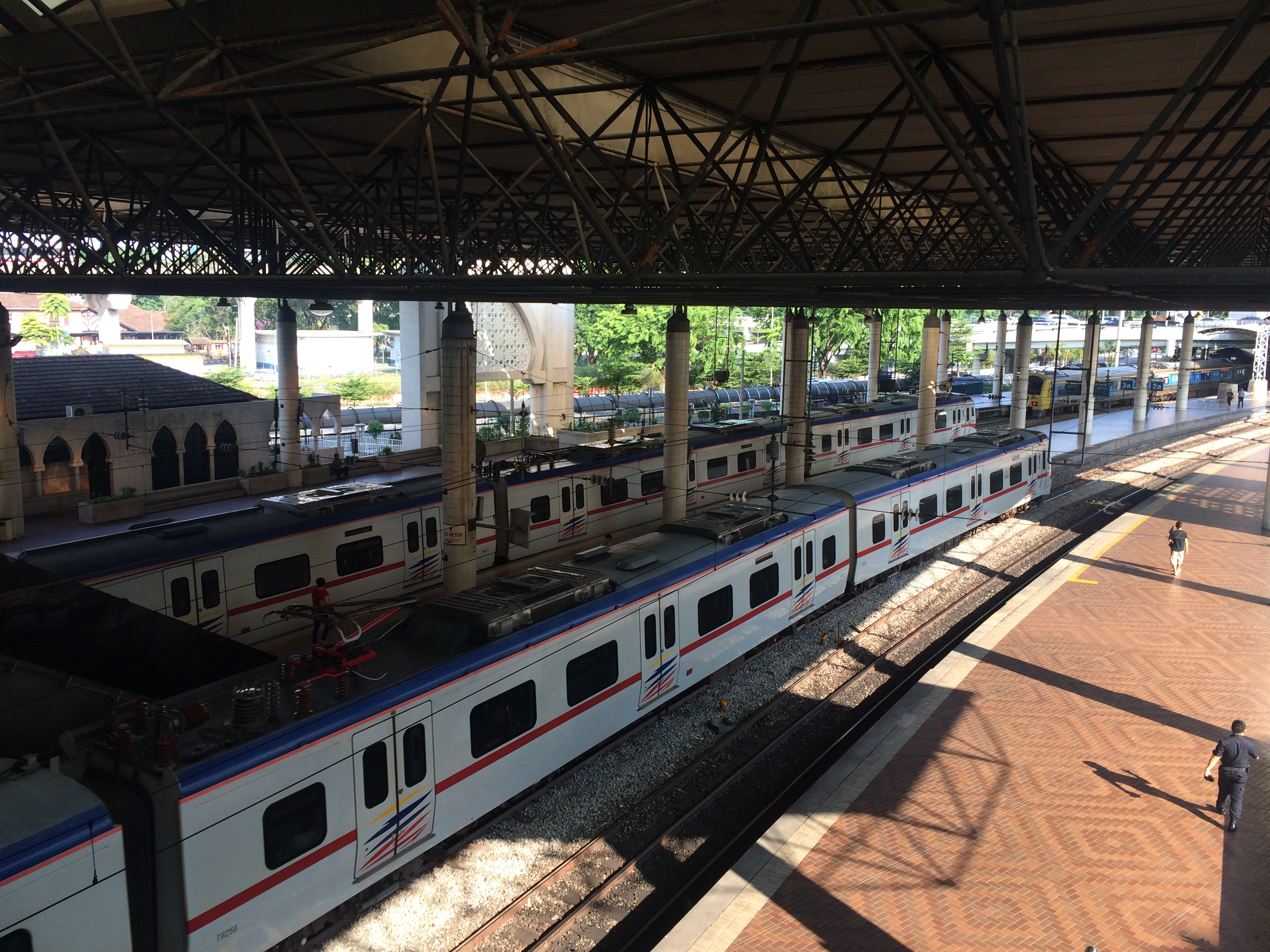
KTM Komuter Class 92 and Class 83 trains waiting at the newer wing of Kuala Lumpur station, built during the 1986 refurbishment

- Directly across Jalan Sultan Hishamuddin:
  - Railway Administration Building
  - Hotel Majestic
  - National Mosque of Malaysia
  - Islamic Arts Museum Malaysia
  - National Planetarium
- To the south:
  - Kuala Lumpur Regional Centre for Arbitration
- To the north:
  - Dayabumi Complex
  - Kuala Lumpur General Post Office
- Across the Klang River:
  - Bridge to Pasar Seni MRT/LRT station
  - Central Market

== See also ==
- Rail transport in Malaysia
