= Class 82 =

Class 82 or 82 class may refer to:

- British Rail Class 82, a class of electric locomotives
- DB Class 82, a class of German 0-10-0T steam locomotives
- KTM Class 82, a class of Malaysian electric multiple units
- New South Wales 82 class locomotive, a class of Australian diesel locomotives
