= Class 92 =

Class 92 may refer to:

- British Rail Class 92, a British electric locomotive
- List of DRG locomotives and railbuses (Class 92), a class of German steam locomotives
- KTM Class 92, a Malaysian electric multiple unit (EMU) train
- New South Wales 92 class locomotive, an Australian diesel-electric locomotive

== See also ==
- Class of '92 a group of football players recruited by Manchester United under the management of Sir Alex Ferguson
- Class of '92 (snooker) a group of three professional snooker players from the United Kingdom
