= KTM Class 83 =

Multiple-unit train in Malaysia

Class 83
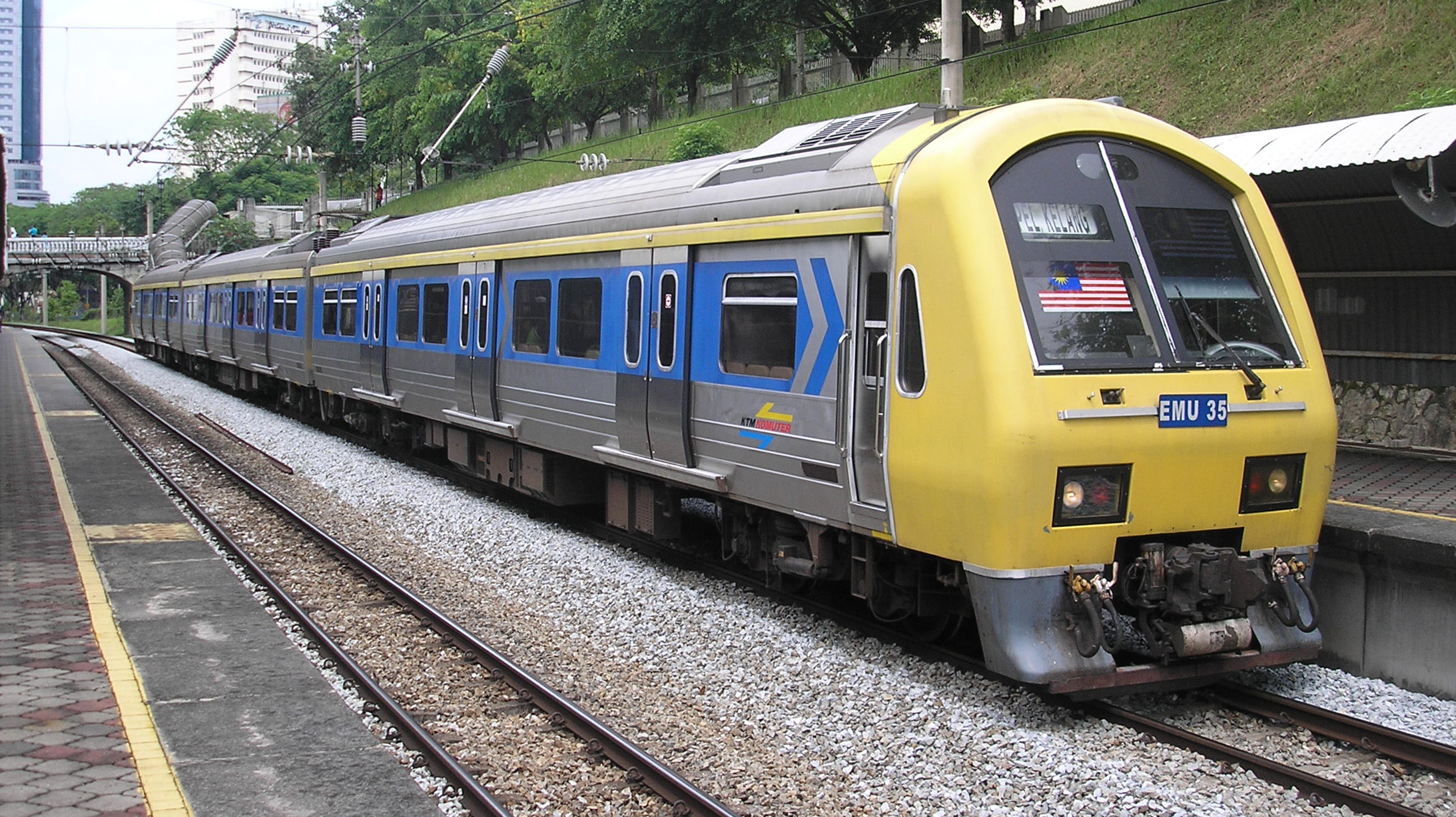
- A Class 83 EMU Komuter train
- In service: 1996–present
- Manufacturers: Hyundai Precision and Marubeni
- Refurbished: Woojin Industrial Systems (2018–)
- Number built: 66 cars (22 sets)
- Number scrapped: 24 cars (8 sets)
- Formation: 3 per trainset
- Capacity: 406 (216 seats)
- Operator: Keretapi Tanah Melayu
- Depots: Batu Gajah Rail Depot; Sentul Komuter Depot
- Lines served: Kempas Baru-Pasir Gudang Line; Butterworth-Ipoh Line; Butterworth-Padang Besar Line; Skypark Link; Port Klang Line (backup trainset); Seremban Line (backup trainset)

Specifications
- Car body construction: Stainless steel
- Train length: 68.4 m (224 ft 5 in)
- Car length: 22.2 m (72 ft 10 in) (end cars); 23.2 m (76 ft 1 in) (intermediate cars)
- Width: 2.75 m (9 ft 0 in)
- Height: 3,855 mm (12 ft 7.8 in)
- Floor height: 1.1 m (3 ft 7 in)
- Doors: 3 double-leaf pneumatic sliding doors per side
- Maximum speed: 160 km/h (99 mph) (design); 125 km/h (78 mph) (service)
- Weight: 123 t (121 long tons; 136 short tons)
- Traction system: Mitsubishi Electric GTO–VVVF (Original); Woojin IGBT-VVVF (Repaired)
- Traction motors: 8 × Mitsubishi Electric MB-5069-A 150 kW (200 hp) 3-phase AC induction motor
- Power output: 1,200 kW (1,600 hp)
- Electric system: 25 kV 50 Hz AC overhead catenary
- Current collection: Brecknell Willis pantograph
- UIC classification: Bo′Bo′+2′2′+Bo′Bo′
- Braking system: single-pipe regenerative braking system
- Track gauge: 1,000 mm (3 ft 3 3/8 in) metre gauge

The Class 83 is a type of electric multiple unit operated by Keretapi Tanah Melayu on its KTM Komuter services. 22 sets were built by Hyundai Precision and Marubeni of South Korea and Japan respectively, in 3-car formations.

The KTM class 83 3-car formation consists of two motor cabs at either end of the set and a single trailer car in between. The trailer car in between is equipped with a Brecknell Willis pantograph for electric pick up. Narrow gangways integrate the 3-car sets. Each car features 3 double-leaf pneumatic sliding doors at either side, and these make the KTM class 83 have the highest density of doors per rail-car in Malaysia.

Over the years, the KTM class 83 has been overhauled a number of times and its interior refurbished. However, its interior layout, consisting of longitudinal seating, has remained the same throughout its service life. Four sets of the Class 83 have been refurbished for the KTM Skypark Link. The colour was also changed from blue and yellow, to orange and grey.

With the withdrawal of the Adtranz/Walkers EMU, which served the Ampang and Sri Petaling lines, the KTM Class 83 is now the second oldest still-functioning electric multiple unit in Malaysia after the KTM Class 81.

== Design ==
The Class 83 was designed with a streamlined sloped head, with large front windows and two high beam lamps concentrated at the center top part of the cavity, and two standard headlights at either bottom sides (later changed to LED lights in 2016). An AAR coupling system is used, and this is compatible with all of KTMB's modern rolling stock. Route direction is indicated on the top-right front of the train within a confined fluorescent lighted box using a lightly transparent plastic, built integrated with the window shell (later replaced with LED destination indicators in 2010). The driver's cab features a dedicated access to the outside, which is atop the door access to the passenger area. The Class 83 cab head is designed to be bottom-heavy, with the bulk of the power transformers located beneath the coach. With full use of the top for passenger use, power traction motors are contained within the bogie itself. In terms of safety, the front outer frame is made of heavy, carbonized steel, which is capable of sustaining high impact, as with the KTM Class 82.

Unlike its successor, the Class 92, the Class 83 trains (as with its sister classes) are endowed with multi-layered tempered glass, which is of a higher degree of impact resistance.

The Class 83 had a top speed of 140 km/h (87 mph), at the time of launch. This was similar to the top speed of the other classes, but significantly faster than the rail buses which were in use at the time. During normal operation, 120 km/h (75 mph) was the typical top speed with the average speed being around 45 km/h (28 mph). Compared to the other classes, the class 83 was found to have the best acceleration among the 8x classes, and this is due to the Mitsubishi regenerative braking system being used, which gave efficient energy conservation during braking and reasonable acceleration during runs.

== Formations ==
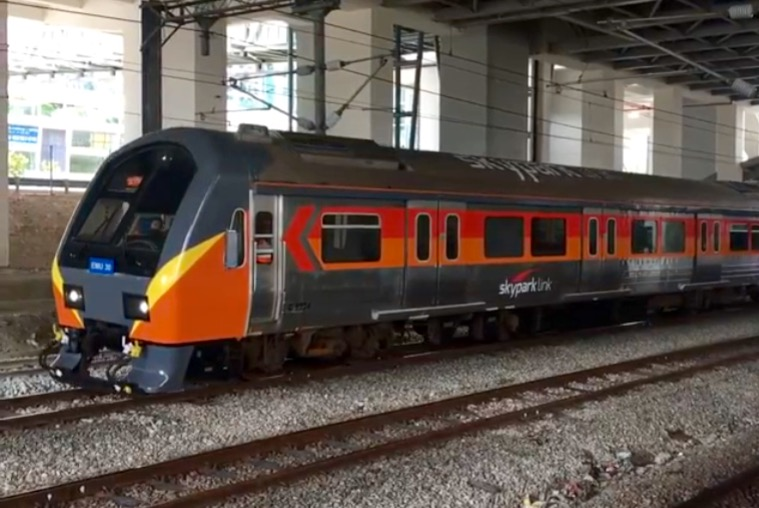
A refurbished Skypark Link Class 83 at the Subang Jaya station

Set Designation	Car Number			Status	Area of deployment	Notes
Set Designation	Car 1	Car 2	Car 3	Status	Area of deployment	Notes
EMU 19	C8301	T8302	C8302	In Service		
EMU 20	C8303	T8301	C8304	Scrapped		
EMU 21	C8305	T8303	C8306	Scrapped		
EMU 22	C8307	T8304	C8308	In Service		
EMU 23	C8309	T8305	C8310	In Service		
EMU 24	C8311	T8306	C8312	In Service		
EMU 25	C8313	T8307	C8314	In Service	Southern Sector	Former Skypark Link train.
EMU 26	C8315	T8308	C8316	In Service		
EMU 27	C8317	T8309	C8318	Scrapped		
EMU 28	C8319	T8310	C8320	In Service		
EMU 29	C8321	T8311	C8322	In Service	Northern Sector	With Kom-Mao-Ter livery.
EMU 30	C8323	T8312	C8324	In Service		Former Skypark Link train.
EMU 31	C8325	T8313	C8326	In Service		
EMU 32	C8327	T8314	C8328	In Service		
EMU 33	C8329	T8315	C8330	In Service		Former Skypark Link train.
EMU 34	C8331	T8316	C8332	Scrapped		
EMU 35	C8333	T8317	C8334	In Service		
EMU 36	C8335	T8318	C8336	Scrapped		
EMU 37	C8337	T8319	C8338	Scrapped		
EMU 38	C8339	T8320	C8340	Scrapped		
EMU 39	C8341	T8321	C8342	In Service		
EMU 40	C8343	T8322	C8344	In Service		

== Accidents and incidents ==
On 1 November 2013, an EMU19 derailed near Rawang station while moving through a track switch. No one was hurt when the incident happened. The two rear coaches were separated and towed away using a locomotive while the remaining front coach was removed by cranes.

On 4 September 2020, an EMU29 was side-swiped by KTM Class 93 near the Kuang Komuter station in Selangor. No fatalities were reported.
