= Dayabumi Complex =

Skyscraper in Kuala Lumpur, Malaysia

- Malay: Kompleks Dayabumi
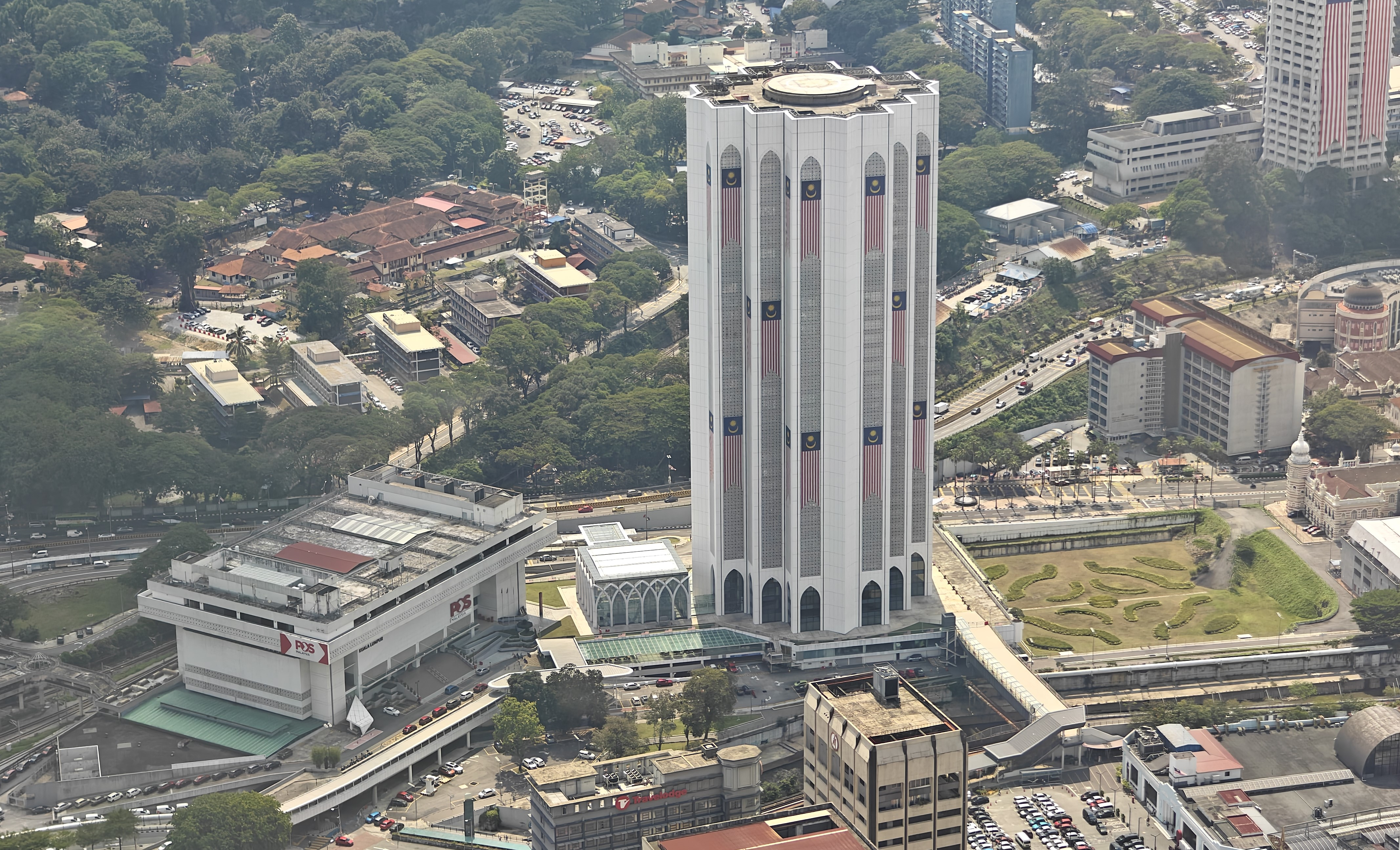
- The Dayabumi Complex taken from Merdeka 118 on August 2025
- Alternative names: Dayabumi Tower (Menara Dayabumi)

General information
- Status: Completed
- Type: Commercial offices
- Location: Jalan Sultan Hishamuddin, Kuala Lumpur, Malaysia
- Coordinates: 3.1449°N 101.69408°E
- Construction started: 14 February 1982; 44 years ago
- Completed: 1984; 42 years ago
- Opening: 5 May 1984; 42 years ago
- Owner: KLCC Property Holdings (a member of Petronas)
- Operator: KLCC Property Holdings (a member of Petronas)

Height
- Roof: 157 m (515 ft)

Technical details
- Floor count: 35
- Floor area: 150,682 m^{2} (1,621,930 sq ft)

Design and construction
- Architects: Arkitek MAA and BEP Architects
- Developer: Urban Development Authority of Malaysia (UDA)

The Dayabumi Complex (Malay: Kompleks Dayabumi) is a major landmark in Kuala Lumpur, Malaysia. It houses several commercial facilities and is one of the earliest skyscrapers in the city. It was officially opened and launched on 5 May 1984 by the fourth prime minister of Malaysia, Tun Dr. Mahathir Mohamad.

== History ==
The complex was originally a site of Malayan Railway workshops and depots from the 1900s until 1981. Developed by the Urban Development Authority as part of the Kuala Lumpur comprehensive urban renewal programme, the 53-hectare complex initially cost RM 200 million to build. The tower block in the complex was planned to be 60 storey high. Several surrounding roads were realigned. The current name was used in 1979.

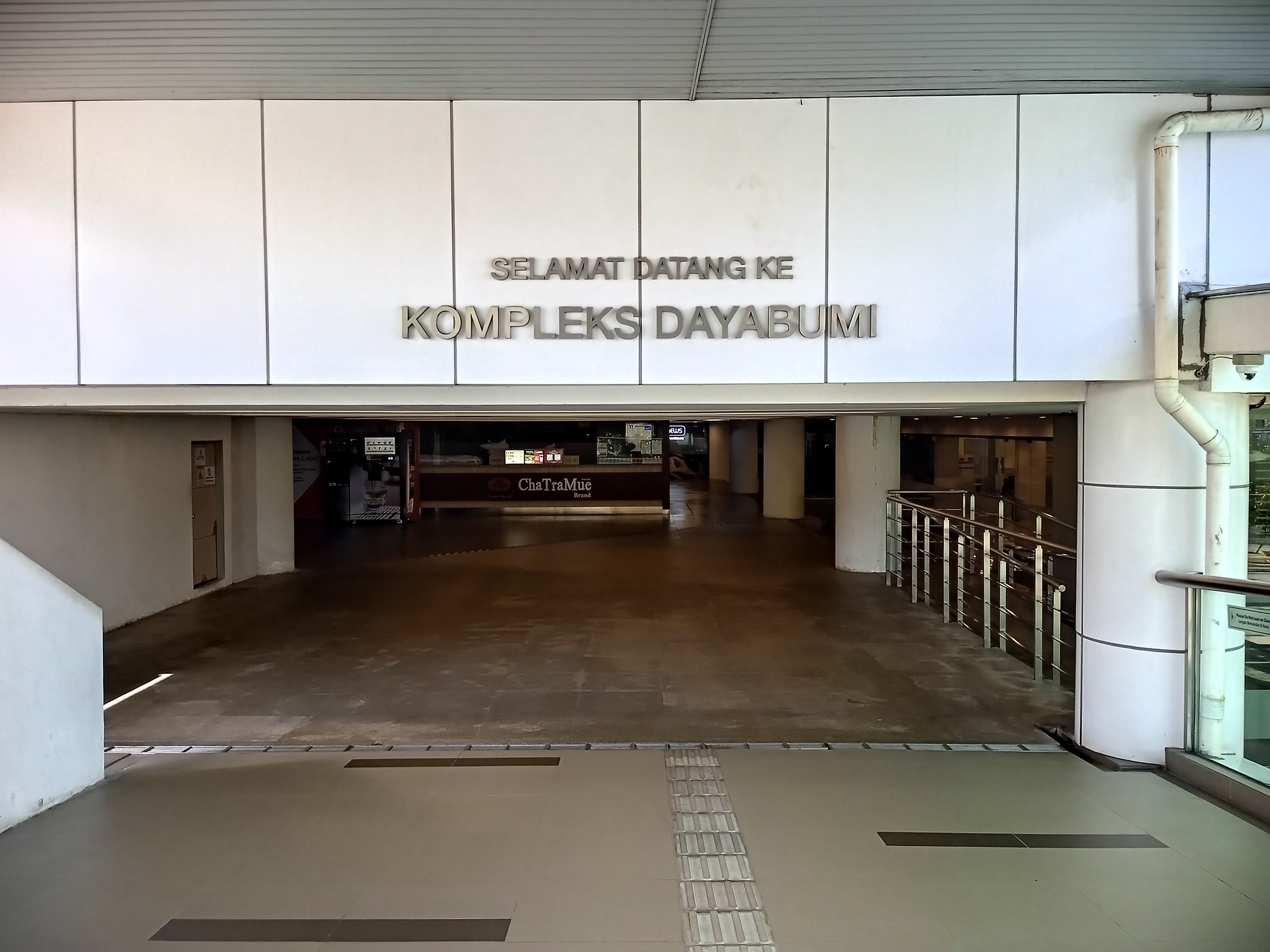
Entrance of Dayabumi Complex in 2025

Construction began on 14 February 1982. Central Market, which is near the banks of Klang River avoided demolition during Dayabumi Complex's construction. The building was completed in February 1984. It was owned by Urban Development Authority of Malaysia (UDA).

Kuala Lumpur Commodity Exchange moved to the complex in June 1984. Petronas moved to the building in the same year after occupying various buildings in the city centre.

The Post Office building was opened on 30 October 1984.

In 2005, the building was taken over by the KLCC Properties Holdings Berhad (KLCCP), a member of Petronas Group.

In 2012, a modernization known as phase II was announced, which was completed in 2014. There is a planned phase III, which, as of 2026, is awaiting building permits.

Dayabumi Complex was designed by Arkitek MAA and BEP Akitek under the joint venture firm BEP+MAA. The landscaped public realm was designed by the urbanist and architect Peter Verity of consultants PDRc. The building was built by Kumagai Gumi Malaysia.

== Dayabumi Complex structures ==
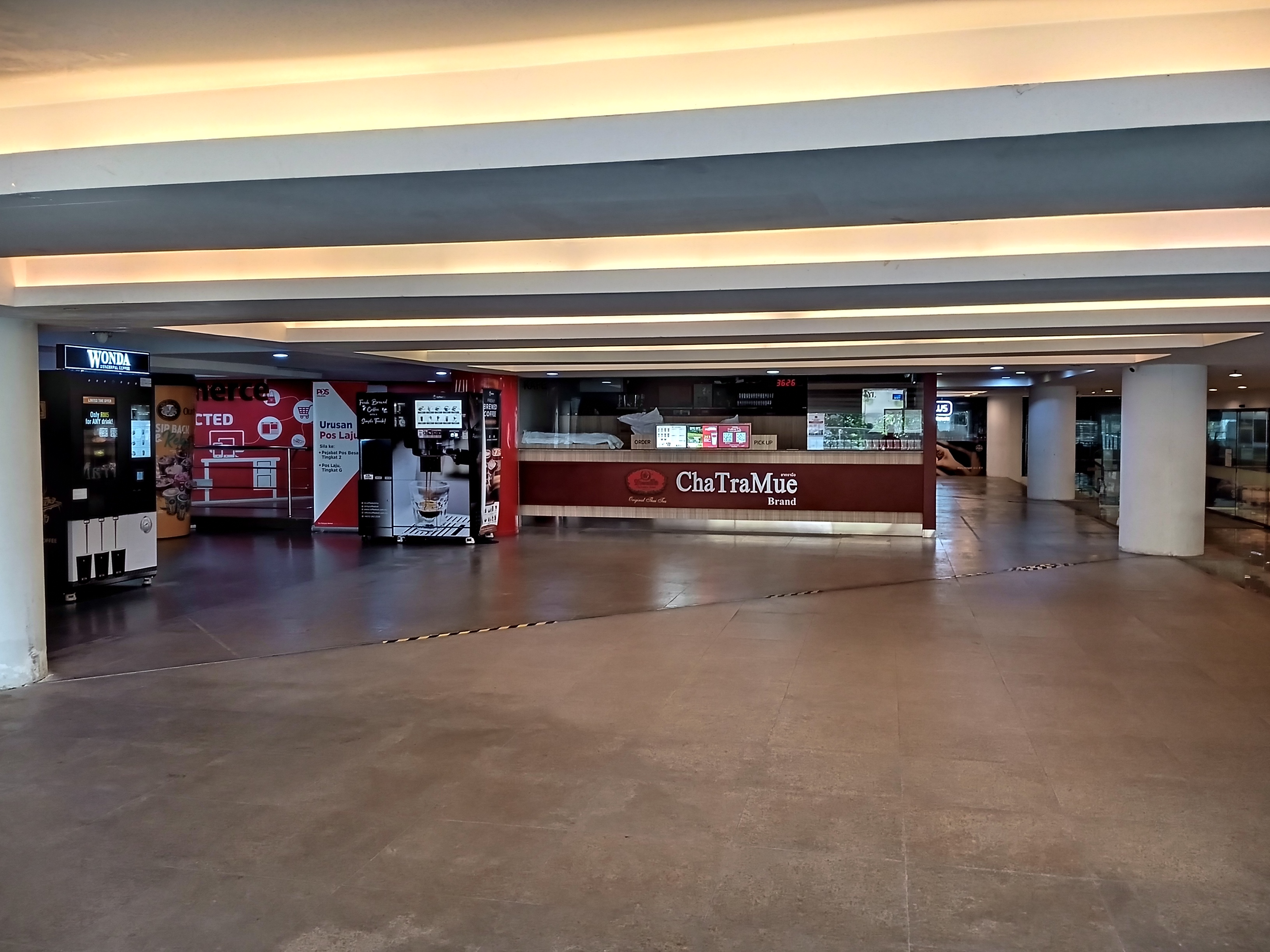
Ground level of Dayabumi Complex, with ChaTraMue branch ahead in 2025

- Dayabumi Tower (35 storeys)
- General Post Office
- City Point shopping complex - demolished in 2015, pending new tower redevelopment
- Connection to KTM Komuter station and LRT/MRT station

== Transportation ==
The building is accessible within walking distance north of Pasar Seni LRT Station.

== See also ==
- List of tallest buildings in Kuala Lumpur
