= KTM Class 82 =

Malaysian electric multiple unit train

Class 82
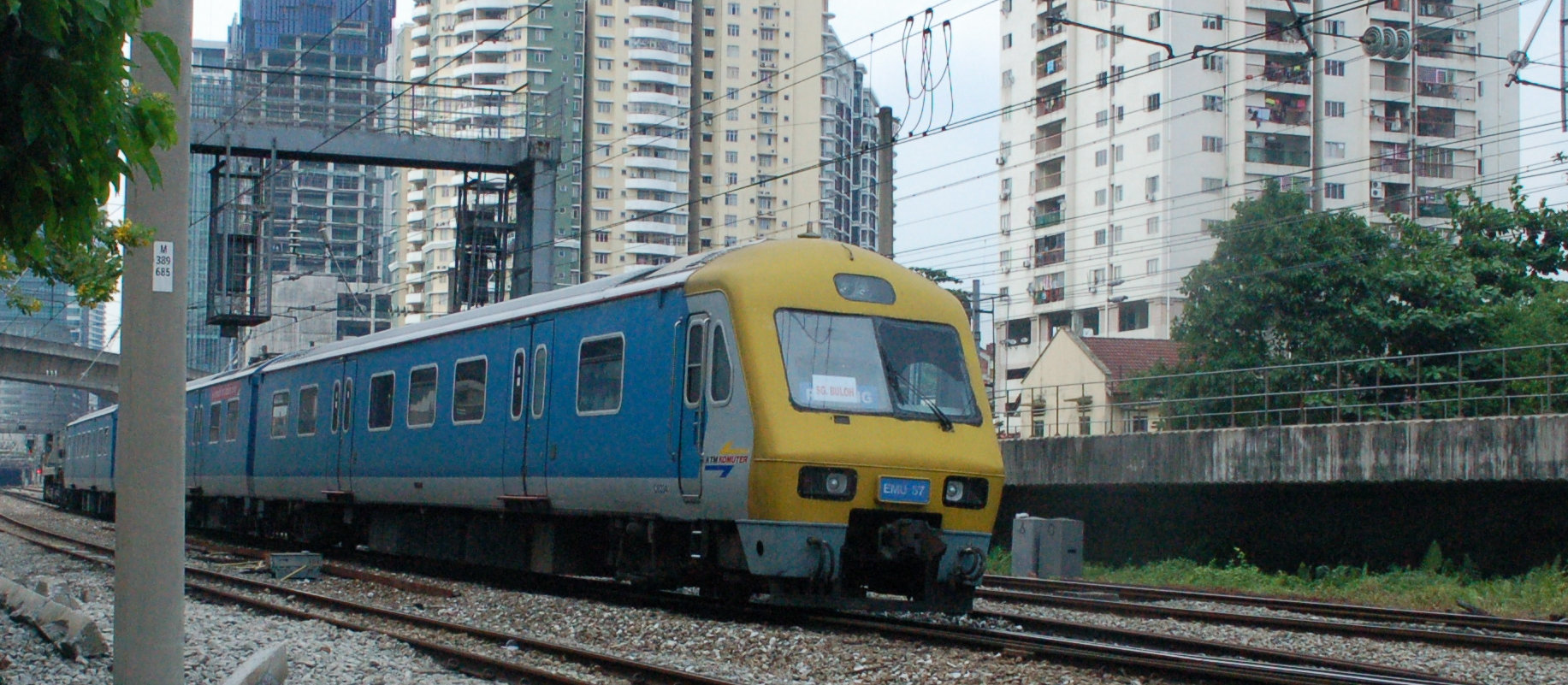
- In service: 1997–2012
- Manufacturer: Union Carriage & Wagon
- Retired: 2012
- Number built: 66 cars (22 sets)
- Successor: KTM Class 92
- Formation: 3 cars per trainset
- Capacity: 462 (212 seats)
- Operator: Keretapi Tanah Melayu
- Depots: Batu Gajah Rail Depot; Sentul Komuter Depot
- Lines served: Batu Caves-Port Klang Route; Rawang-Seremban Route

Specifications
- Car body construction: Aluminium, heavy steel material
- Train length: 68.4 m (224 ft 5 in)
- Car length: 22.2 m (72 ft 10 in) (end cars); 23.2 m (76 ft 1 in) (intermediate cars)
- Width: 2.75 m (9 ft 0 in)
- Height: 3,855 mm (12 ft 7.8 in)
- Floor height: 1.1 m (3 ft 7 in)
- Doors: 2 double-leaf plug sliding doors per side
- Maximum speed: 160 km/h (99 mph) (design); 120 km/h (75 mph) (service)
- Weight: 130 t (130 long tons; 140 short tons)
- Traction system: GEC Alsthom GTO–C/I (Converter and Inverter)
- Traction motors: 8 × GEC Alsthom 4EXA-2113 160 kW (210 hp) 3-phase AC induction motor
- Power output: 1,280 kW (1,720 hp)
- Electric system: 25 kV 50 Hz AC overhead catenary
- Current collection: Double-arm Z-shaped pantograph
- UIC classification: Bo′Bo′+2′2′+Bo′Bo′
- Braking system: Single-pipe regenerative break system
- Track gauge: 1,000 mm (3 ft 3 3/8 in) metre gauge

The Class 82 was a type of sub-urban rail electric multiple unit that once operated by Keretapi Tanah Melayu on its KTM Komuter services. Each unit consists of two driving motor cars and a trailer cars. All were retired by 2012 after being replaced by the Class 92.

== Design ==
The Class 82 was designed with a streamlined sloped head with two high beam lamps concentrated at the center top with two standard headlights at either sides. The route direction was indicated on the front of the train within a confined fluorescent-lighted box made of lightly transparent plastic. The Class 82 trains have two double-leaf pressure plug doors per side for each coach. The cab head was designed to be bottom heavy with the bulk of the power transformers and motors located beneath the coach, allowing saloon space to be maximised. The front outer frame was made of heavy carbonized steel, which was capable of sustaining high impact. An ARR coupling system was used, and it is still compatible with all of KTMB's modern rolling stock. Unlike its successor, the Class 92, the Class 82 trains were endowed with multi-layered tempered glass that is of a higher degree of impact resistance.

== Description ==
22 three car sets were built and delivered by Union Carriage & Wagon of South Africa from 1996 to 1997. The Class 82 sets were deployed in stages, with the final set coming into service in December 1998.

The KTM Class 82 three-car formation consists of two motor cabs at either end of the set and a single trailer car in between, the trailer car in between is equipped with a double-arm Z-shaped pantograph for 25 kV 50 Hz AC electric pick up. Narrow gangways integrate the three-car sets, allowing full walking from cab to cab. Each car features two double-leaf electric plug doors at either side. Printed route maps are displayed on each door, along with emergency stop levers.

The Class 82 has a top speed of 140 km/h (87 mph), which was similar to the top speed of the other EMU classes but significantly faster than the railbuses that were in use at the time. During normal operation, 120 km/h (75 mph) was the typical top speed with the average speed being around 45 km/h (28 mph). The Class 82 was said to have better energy efficiency when compared to the Class 81. This was due to the GEC Alstom regenerative braking system being used which gave better acceleration during runs.

== Overhauls & refurbishment ==
Over its operational life, the KTM Class 82 has seen its life extended through numerous schemes of overhauling and refurbishment. However, the closure of Union Carriage & Wagons' international rail business saw an end to any future replacement parts for the Class 82. Tropical weather proved more than taxing for the Class 82 with the premature failure of many irreplaceable parts. Although there have been attempts to substitute parts with those of a different make, the economics and technological expertise were not on the side of the Class 82, and the Class 82 soon found itself in the precarious state of having to resort to cannibalizing the parts of older sets in order to keep the remaining fleet in operation.

== Service history ==
The Class 82 used to operate in a fixed 3-car formation for its regular service. During the 1995–1999 period, it used to operate at peak hours in a 3+3 car formation. But this configuration was soon discontinued.

Briefly from 2010 to 2012, all train sets of this class were used in a hybrid diesel pull configuration in which an unpowered EMU would be towed by a diesel locomotive while it got electricity from an attached commercial generator wagon. Since the transformers and power pick-ups could not be replaced, the company dubbed these as KTM "Hybrid" trains, serviced at both the Batu Caves-Klang and Kajang-Rawang routes.

Despite its young age, the arrival of the KTM Class 92 in 2012 resulted in the total retirement of the entire KTM Class 82 fleet, with many being cannibalized for parts, while others are being retired due to accidents and incidents. There are no more working sets available for use, adding to the complexity of not being able to source any more parts from the factory. This marks the end of the entire KTM Class 82's short history. 6 Class 82 sets have been abandoned at Ipoh Rail Yard. The whereabouts of the other sets are currently unknown.

== Formation ==
Set Designation	Car Number			Status
Set Designation	Car 1	Car 2	Car 3	Status
EMU 41	C8201	T8201	C8202	Retired from Hybrid Service
EMU 42	C8203	T8202	C8204	Abandoned at Ipoh
EMU 43	C8205	T8203	C8206	Retired from Hybrid Service
EMU 44	C8207	T8204	C8208	Abandoned at Ipoh
EMU 45	C8209	T8205	C8210	Retired from Hybrid Service
EMU 46	C8211	T8206	C8212	Retired from Hybrid Service
EMU 47	C8213	T8207	C8214	Retired from Hybrid Service
EMU 48	C8215	T8208	C8216	Abandoned at Ipoh
EMU 49	C8217	T8209	C8218	Abandoned at Ipoh
EMU 50	C8219	T8210	C8220	Abandoned at Ipoh
EMU 51	C8221	T8211	C8222	Abandoned at Ipoh
EMU 52	C8223	T8212	C8224	Abandoned at Ipoh
EMU 53	C8225	T8213	C8226	Abandoned at Ipoh
EMU 54	C8227	T8214	C8228	Abandoned at Ipoh
EMU 55	C8229	T8215	C8230	Abandoned at Ipoh
EMU 56	C8231	T8216	C8232	Retired from Hybrid Service
EMU 57	C8233	T8217	C8234	Retired from Hybrid Service
EMU 58	C8235	T8218	C8236	Abandoned at Ipoh
EMU 59	C8237	T8219	C8238	Retired from Hybrid Service
EMU 60	C8239	T8220	C8240	Abandoned at Ipoh
EMU 61	C8241	T8221	C8242	Abandoned at Ipoh
EMU 62	C8243	T8222	C8244	Abandoned at Ipoh

== Gallery ==
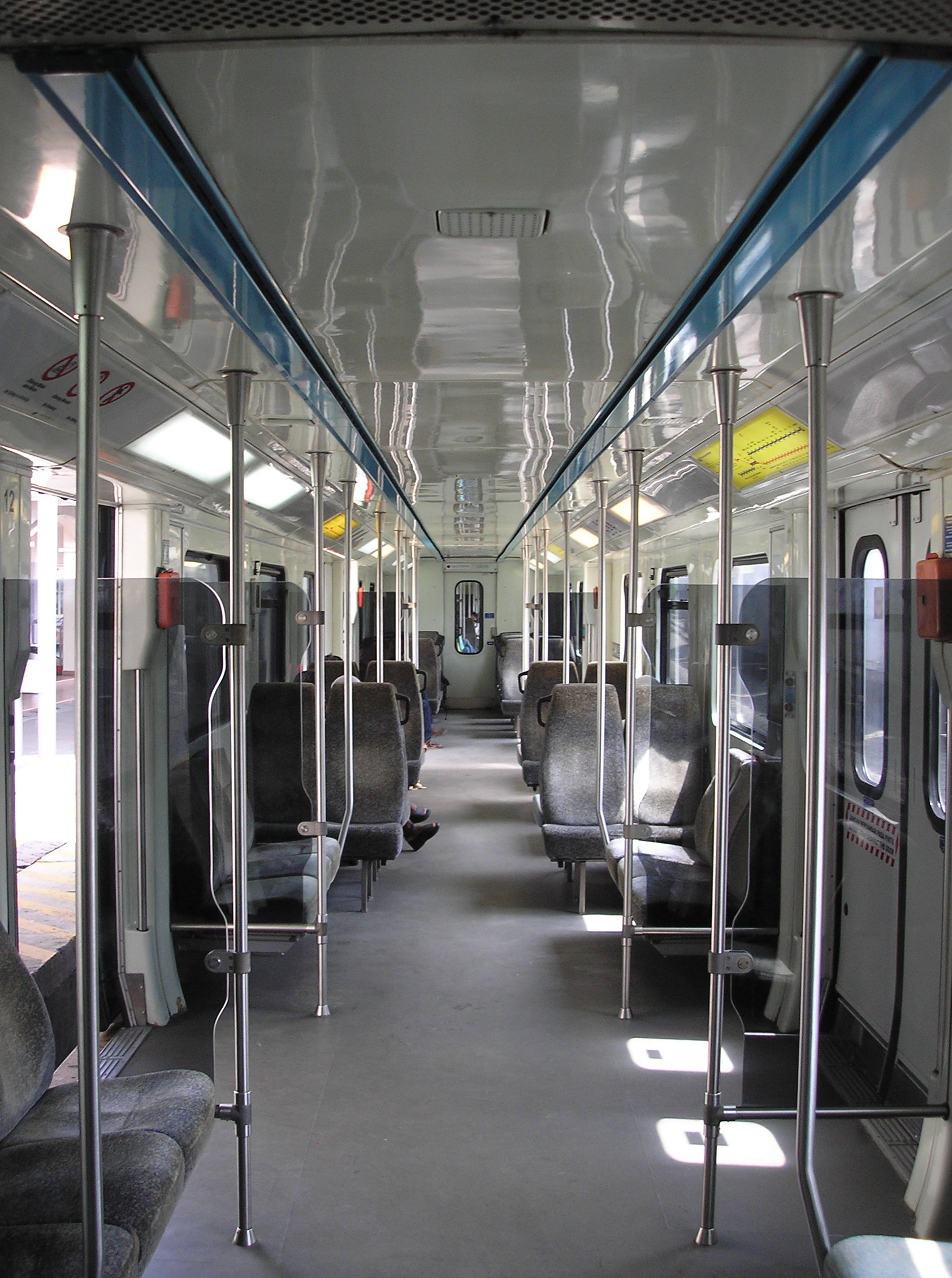
The interior of the KTM Komuter Class 82

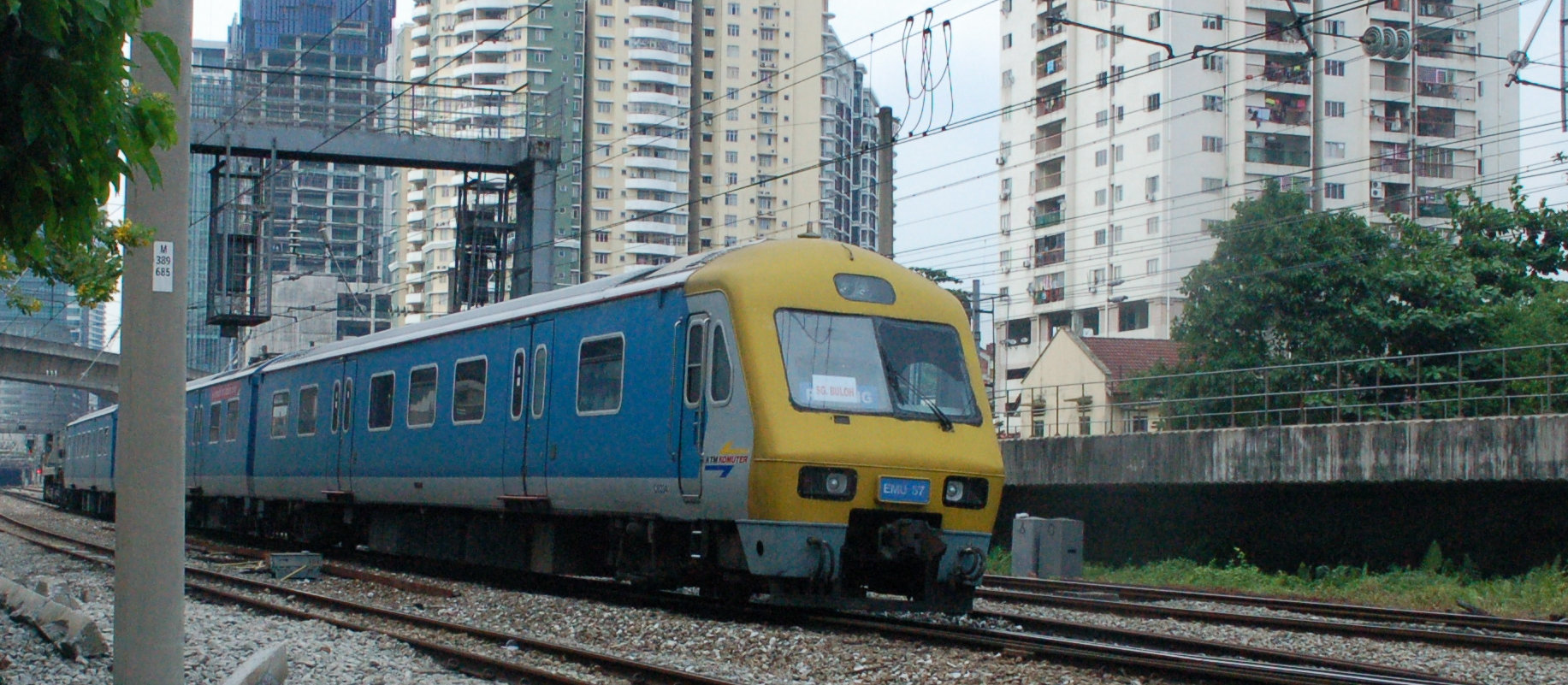
KTM Class 82 EMU57 running in Hybrid formation (both locomotive and generator at the front of the train)

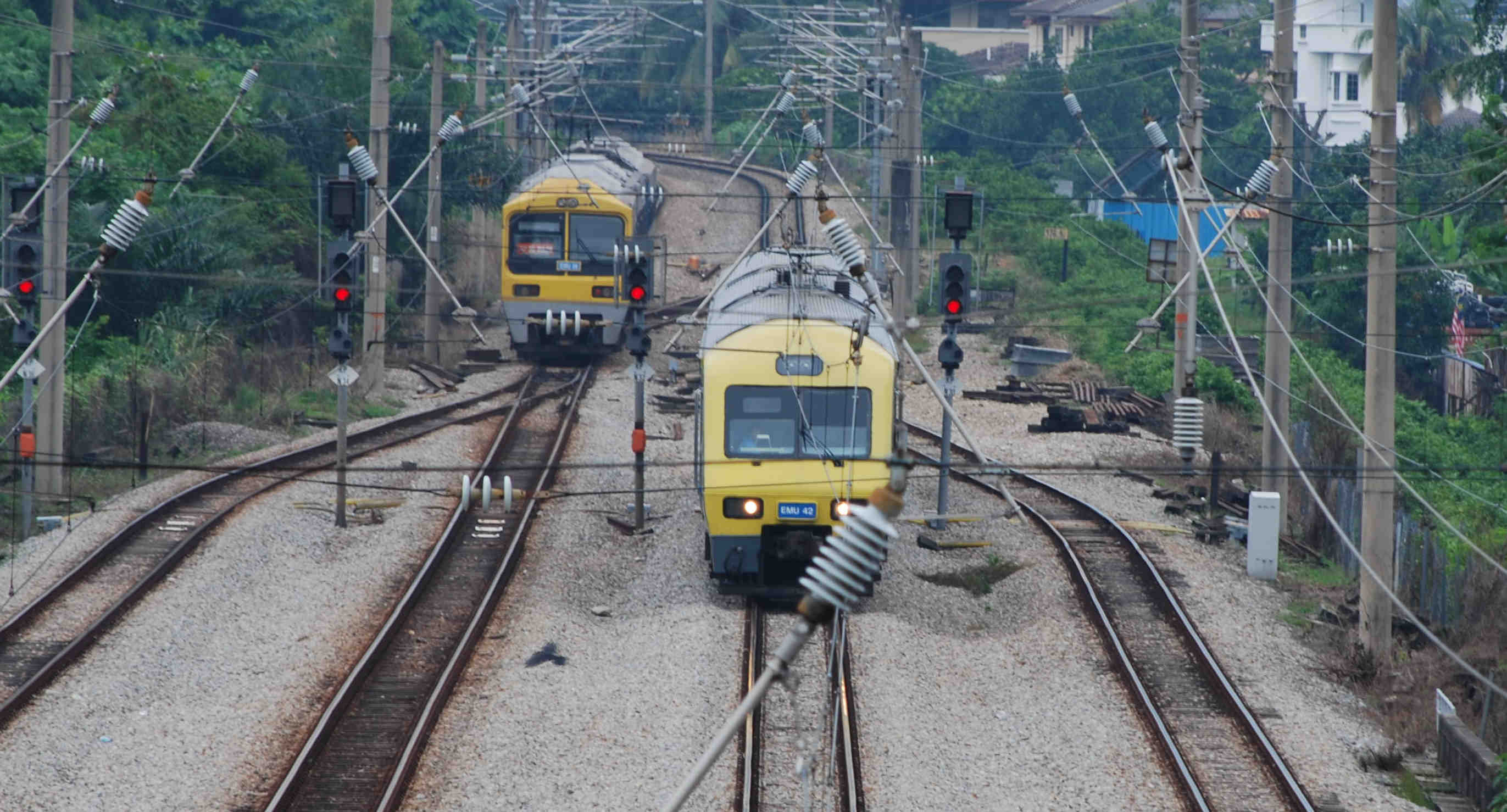
KTM Class 81 EMU14 & Class 82 EMU42, both at Sungai Buloh station

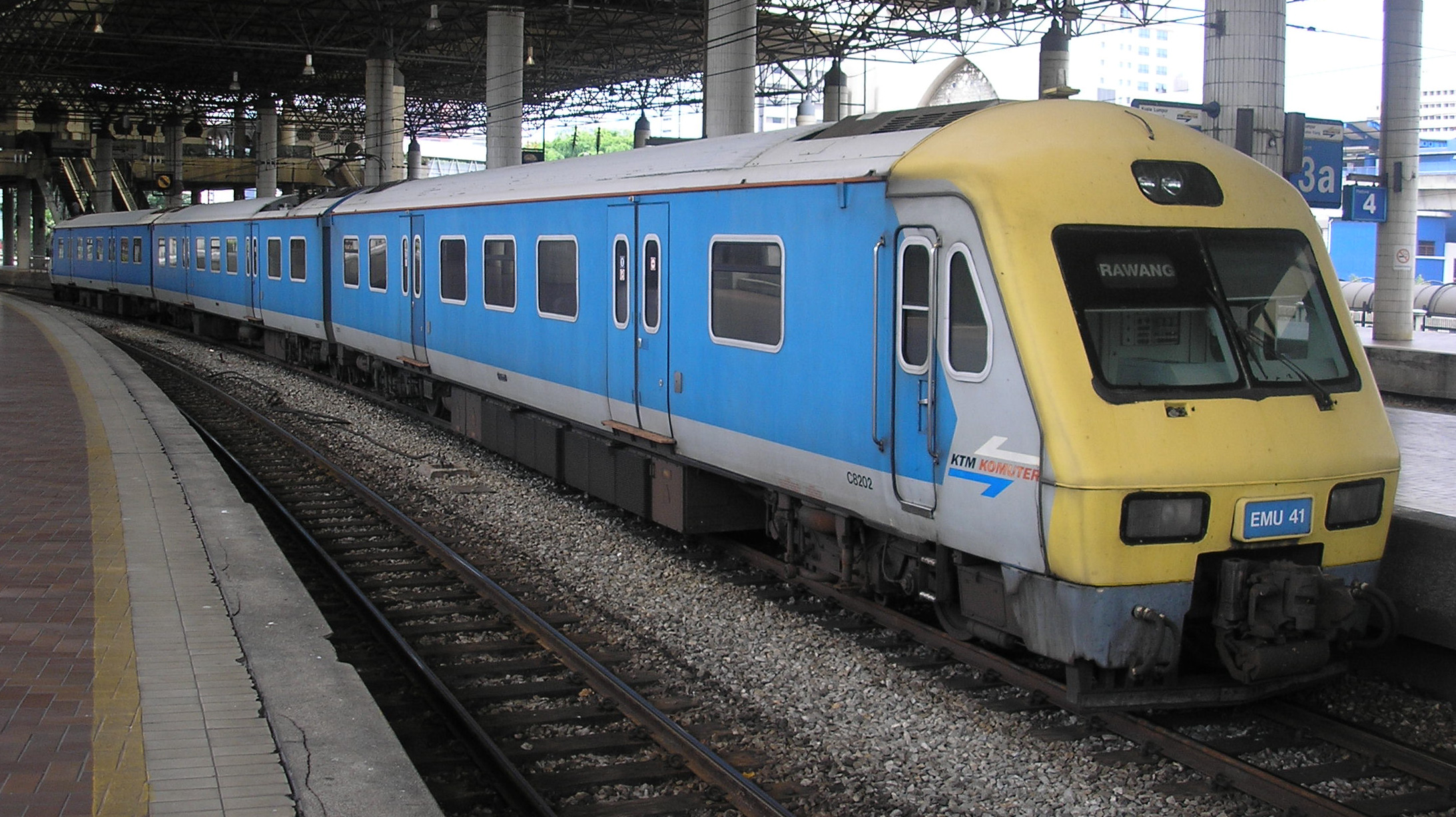
KTM Class 82 EMU41 at Kuala Lumpur station
