= Kuala Lumpur General Post Office =

Post office in Kuala Lumpur, Malaysia

Coordinates: 3.1440426°N 101.6926347°E

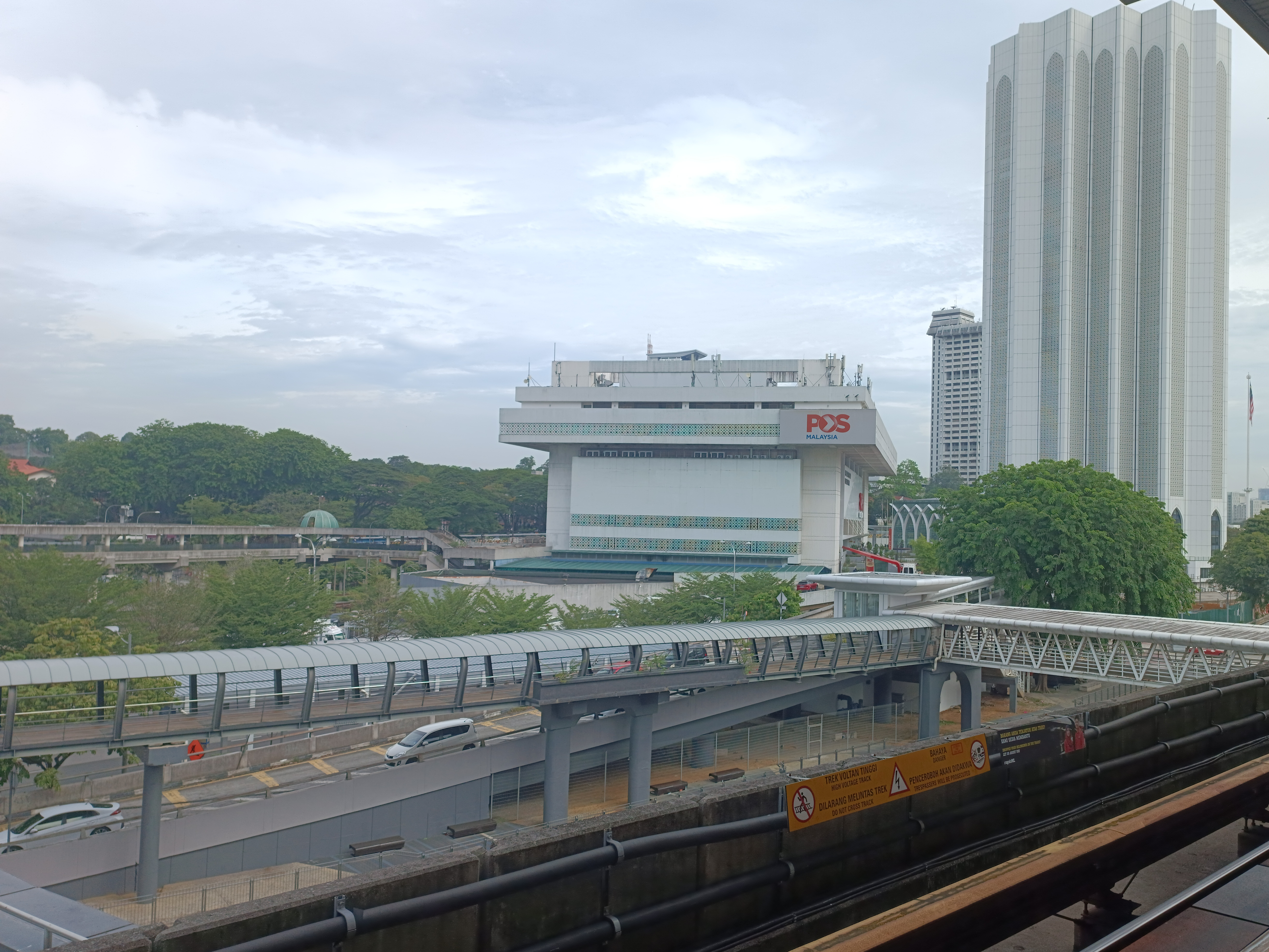
Kuala Lumpur General Post Office building

Kuala Lumpur General Post Office (Malay: Pejabat Pos Besar Kuala Lumpur) is the biggest general post office in Malaysia. Located at the Dayabumi Complex, it was opened by then-Prime Minister Mahathir Mohamad on 30 October 1984. It is managed by Pos Malaysia.

== Transportation ==
The post office is accessible within walking distance northwest of Pasar Seni LRT Station.
