= KTM Class 92 =

Electric train manufactured by CRRC Zhuzhou

Class 92
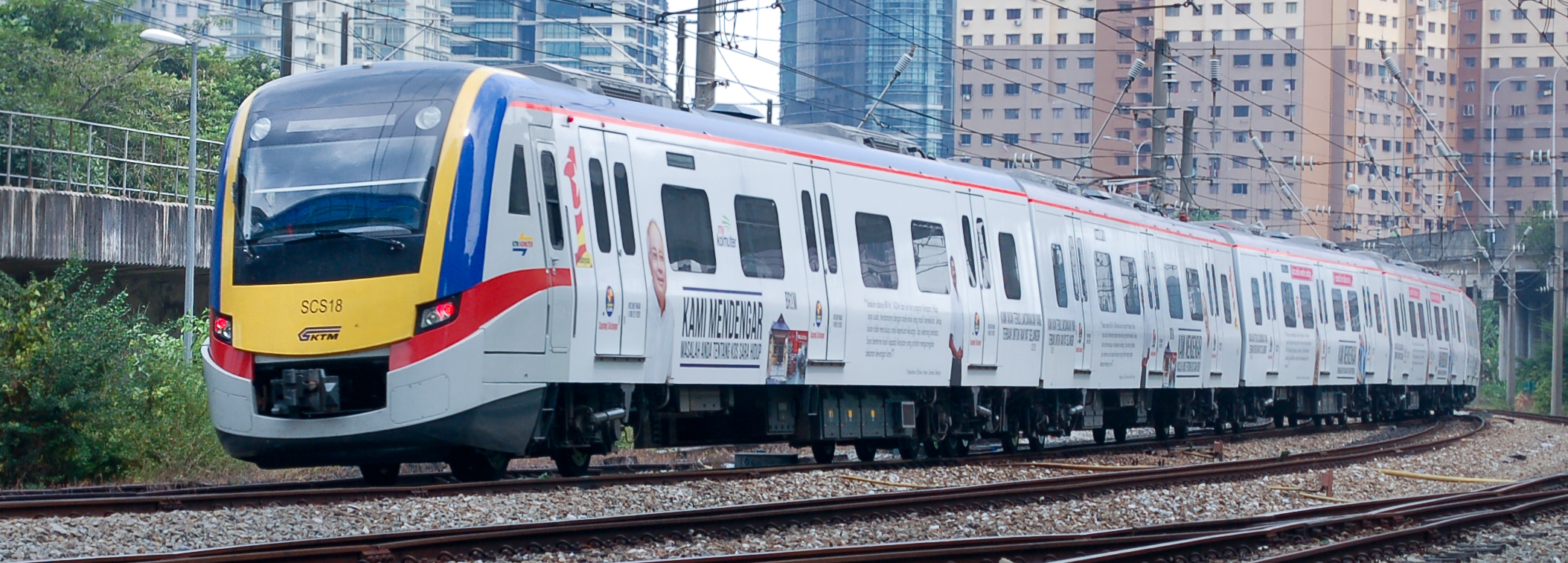
- A Class 92 EMU Komuter train
- In service: March 2012–present
- Manufacturer: CSR Zhuzhou
- Built at: Zhuzhou, China
- Constructed: 2010–2012
- Number built: 228 cars (38 sets)
- Number in service: 222 cars (37 sets)
- Formation: 6 cars per trainset
- Capacity: 1118 (328 seats)
- Operator: Keretapi Tanah Melayu
- Depots: Batu Gajah Rail Depot; Sentul Komuter Depot; Tanjung Malim Staging Area; New Seremban Komuter Depot (Sept 2013)
- Lines served: Batu Caves-Seremban Route; Tanjung Malim-Port Klang Route; Butterworth-Padang Besar Route; Butterworth-Ipoh Route

Specifications
- Car body construction: Aluminium
- Train length: 138.6 m (454 ft 8 11/16 in)
- Car length: 23.7 m (77 ft 9 1/16 in) (Mc); 22.8 m (74 ft 9 5/8 in) (Tp/M)
- Width: 2.75 m (9 ft 1/4 in)
- Height: 3,905 mm (12 ft 9 3/4 in)
- Floor height: 1.1 m (3 ft 7 5/16 in)
- Doors: 3 double-leaf doors per side
- Wheel diameter: 850 mm (33 7/16 in)
- Maximum speed: Service: 125 km/h (80 mph); Design: 140 km/h (90 mph)
- Weight: 238 t (234 long tons; 262 short tons)
- Traction system: Siemens SIBAC E951 D1442/310 M5 reaq IGBT–C/I
- Traction motors: 16 × Siemens 1TB2004-0GA02 160 kW (210 hp) 3-phase AC induction motor
- Power output: 2,560 kW (3,430 hp)
- Electric system: 25 kV 50 Hz AC overhead line
- Current collection: Double-arm Z-shaped Pantograph
- UIC classification: Bo′Bo′+2′2′+Bo′Bo′+Bo′Bo′+2′2′+Bo′Bo′
- Braking system: two-pipe regenerative brake system
- Safety systems: ETCS, ATP
- Coupling system: AAR
- Track gauge: 1,000 mm (3 ft 3 3/8 in) metre gauge

The Class 92, informally known by its designation class SCS (abbreviation for six-car sets), is a type of electric multiple unit operated by Keretapi Tanah Melayu on its KTM Komuter services. A total of 38 sets were built by CSR Zhuzhou of China, in 6-car formations.

== History ==
The Class 92 was procured under a Malaysian Government initiative, National Key Result Area (NKRA) to reduce congestion and improve public transport with a specific RM2 billion allocation to KTMB to improve commuter rail efficiency. A sum of RM 1.894 billion was spent to procure these trains, with the remainder being spent on the improvement of signaling along the Putra-Mid Valley stretch and a ticketing system upgrade.

The first EMU was delivered on 23 September 2011 and was expected to operate in revenue service by late December 2011. However, delays in testing led to the subsequent postponement of launch. On 8 March 2012, 4 sets commenced operation. All 38 sets were in revenue service by July 2012.

== Features ==
Designed for low dwell times and high passenger seating capacity, the trains have three double leaf doors per side. The driving motors have longitudinal seating only while the trailer feature a mixture of longitudinal and traverse 2+2 seating. It has wide gang-ways interconnecting each coach, allowing passengers to distribute effectively throughout the length of the train. However, two middle coaches of the class 92 is designated women's only coaches by its operator KTM, limiting full interactivity within the train set with the exception of the Butterworth-Padang Besar Route, where the coach designation is not enforced. Dynamic route maps located above doors details trains position relative to station in real-time. CCTVs and 3-pin power outlets are provided as further features. All trains have over-head air-conditioning systems to provide ventilation, dehumidification and comfortable temperature control.

The KTM Class 92 trains are fitted with 65 million euros worth of Siemens made transformers, power converters, traction motors and vehicle control systems.

== Operation ==
The Class 92 operates along the two Komuter lines in the Central Sector. During current 15-minute frequency operations, as many as 25 class 92 sets are used while the remaining sets are kept in reserve. In the future (10-minute frequency operations), it is expected for the total maximum of concurrently used sets to increase to 36 with 2 to remain in reserve.

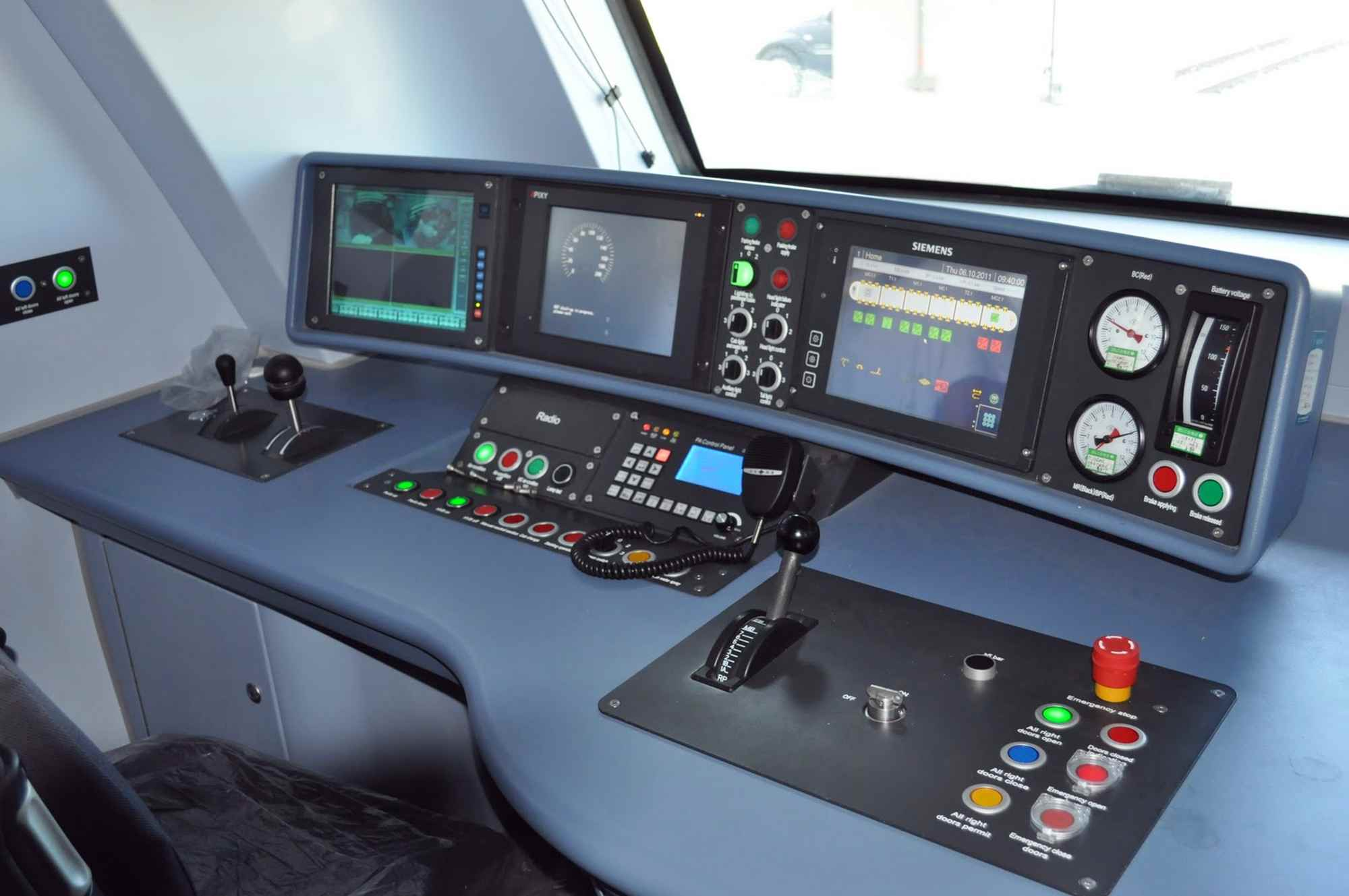
The Class 92 SCS uses Siemens instruments for control.

=== Special service ===
During festivities, the KTM Class 92 is used for special services. Special services typically occur during occasions such as the "homecoming" exodus, saw class 92 sets operating intercity routes, such as the KL Sentral-Ipoh route complementing the ETS train service. In other festivities, such as the festival of Thaipusam, the class 92 also provides service from Ipoh direct to Batu Caves.

=== Maintenance and Depot ===
The Class 92 sets is maintained by its manufacturer CSR Zhuzhou. The maintenance facility will be based mainly at KTM’s Sentul Komuter Depot while a minor secondary base is located at Tanjung Malim.

On top of all that, a new special 16.34 hectares (40 acres) commuter maintenance depot is being built (completion by Sept 2013) in the vicinity of Seremban station to house the class 92. The depot will have a capacity of stabling 19 six coach Class 92 sets and be able to conduct simultaneous maintenance work on up to 6 sets of commuter trains. The depot will also have up to 15 tracks of 6 km (3.7 mi) each to store and maintain trains. The depot will also stage other Rawang-Seremban line rolling stocks.

== Design and construction ==
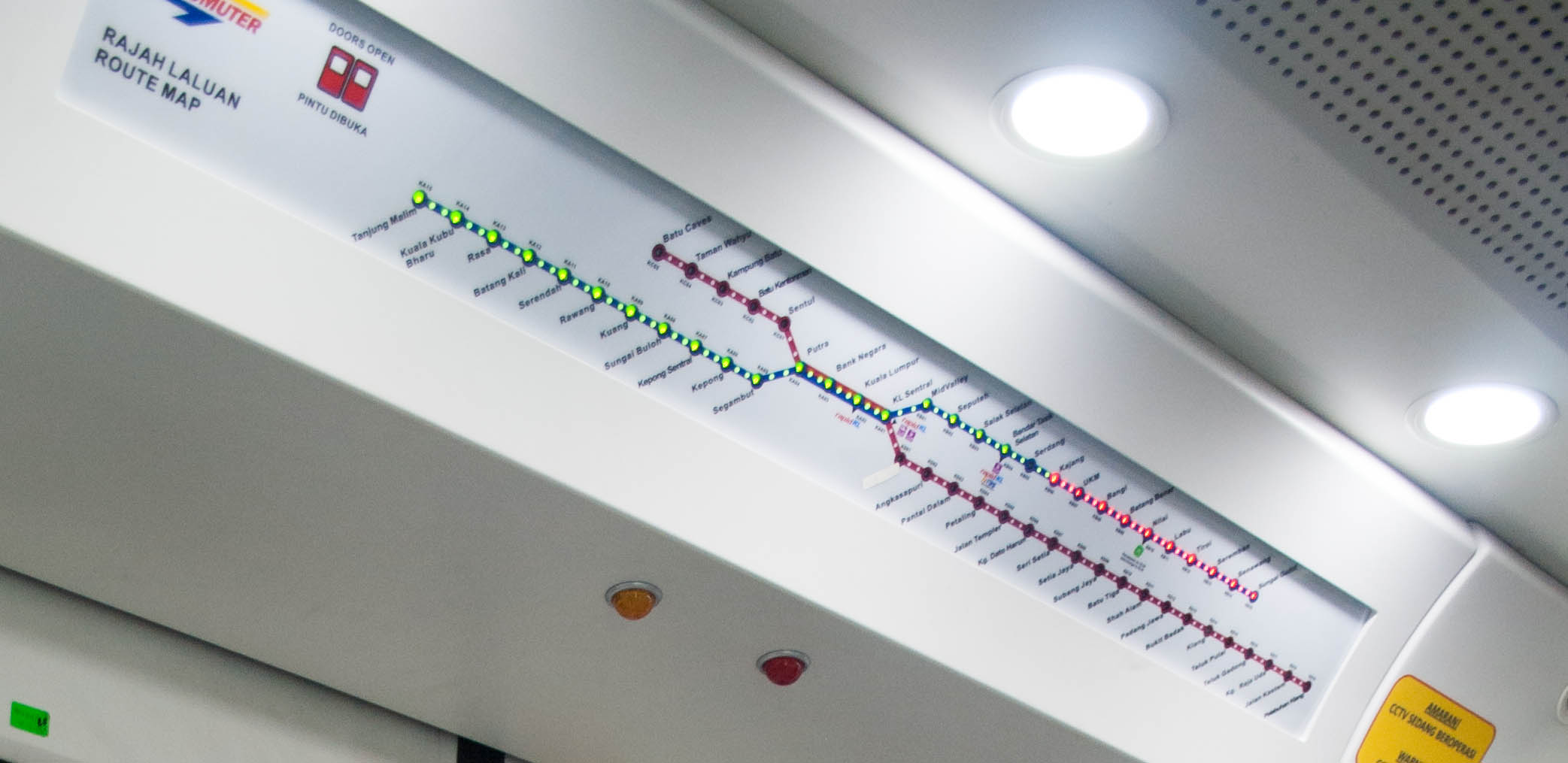
The Class 92 SCS is one of the first trains in Malaysia to introduce dynamic route passenger information systems.

The exterior and interior of the class 92 is fully designed in Germany by Tricon Design for CSR Zhuzhou. The exterior has a Malaysian tiger inspired front motif and tiger fur side coating. Sometimes the train livery are ads

The trains were assembled in CSR Zhuzhou's Electric Plant train factory in China, while power traction units and vehicle control systems were built by Siemens in Germany.

== Formation ==
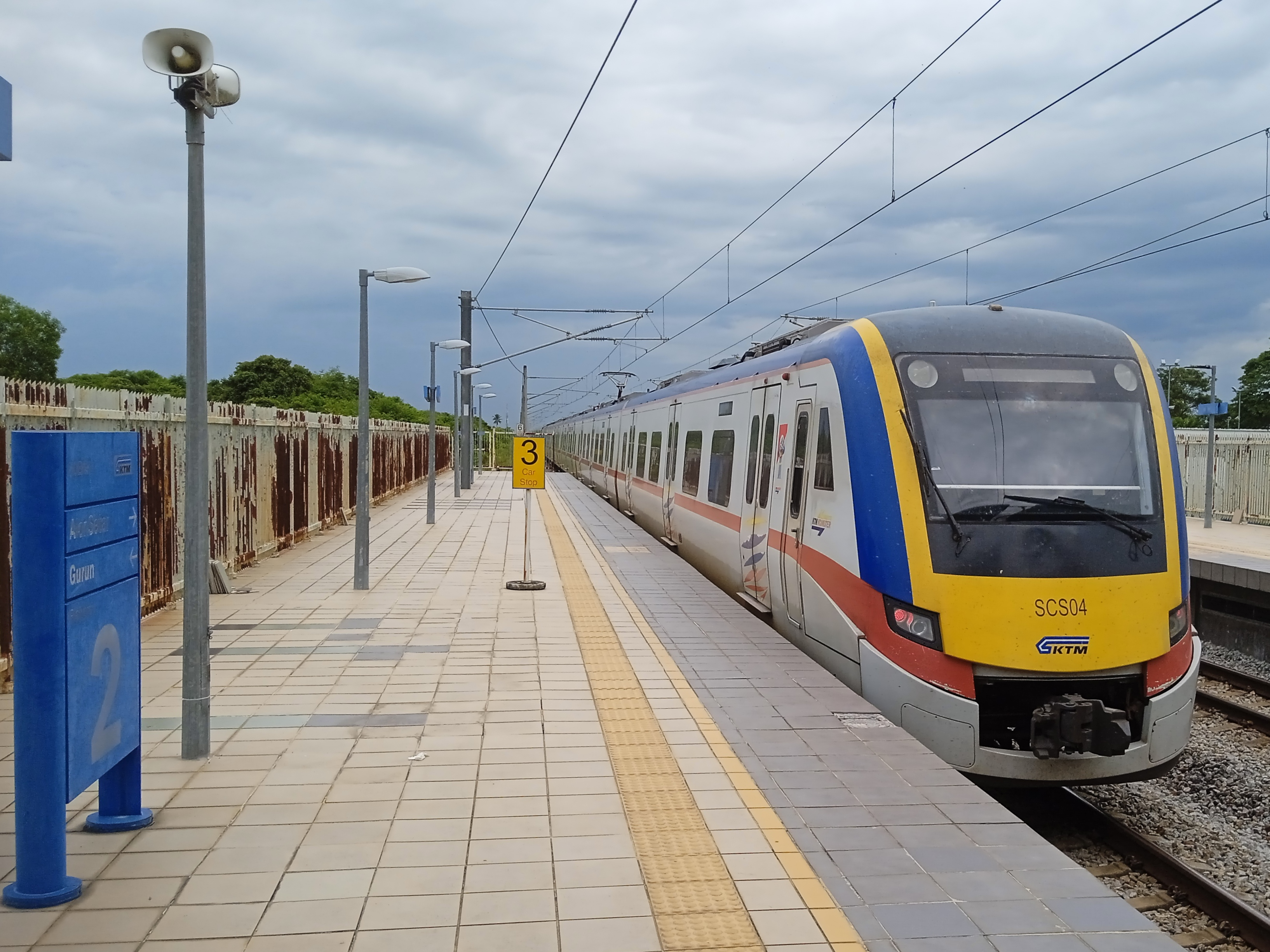
Class 92 SCS 04 depart from Kobah railway station in KTM Komuter Northern Sector service

Car No.	1	2	3	4	5	6
Seating capacity	50	57	57	57	57	50
Designation	Mc	Tp	M	M	Tp	Mc

Set Designation	1	2	3	4	5	6	Arrival Date	Status	Launch Date
Class 92 SCS 01	C9201	T9201	M9201	M9202	T9202	C9202	Arrived Sept 22	Operational	8 March
Class 92 SCS 02	C9203	T9203	M9203	M9204	T9204	C9204	Arrived Oct 19	Operational	8 March
Class 92 SCS 03	C9205	T9205	M9205	M9206	T9206	C9206	Arrived Nov	Crashed	8 March
Class 92 SCS 04	C9207	T9207	M9207	M9208	T9208	C9208	Arrived Nov	Operational	8 March
Class 92 SCS 05	C9209	T9209	M9209	M9210	T9210	C9210	Arrived Nov	Operational	31 March
Class 92 SCS 06	C9211	T9211	M9211	M9212	T9212	C9212	Arrived Nov	Crashed	31 March
Class 92 SCS 07	C9213	T9213	M9213	M9214	T9214	C9214	Arrived Dec	Operational	31 March
Class 92 SCS 08	C9215	T9215	M9215	M9216	T9216	C9216	Arrived Dec	Operational	31 March
Class 92 SCS 09	C9217	T9217	M9217	M9218	T9218	C9218	Arrived Dec	Operational	31 March
Class 92 SCS 10	C9219	T9219	M9219	M9220	T9220	C9220	Arrived Jan	Operational	31 March
Class 92 SCS 11	C9221	T9221	M9221	M9222	T9222	C9222	Arrived Jan	Operational	May
Class 92 SCS 12	C9223	T9223	M9223	M9224	T9224	C9224	Arrived Jan	Operational	May
Class 92 SCS 13	C9225	T9225	M9225	M9226	T9226	C9226	Arrived Feb	Operational	May
Class 92 SCS 14	C9227	T9227	M9227	M9228	T9228	C9228	Arrived Feb	Operational	May
Class 92 SCS 15	C9229	T9229	M9229	M9230	T9230	C9230	Arrived Feb	Operational	May
Class 92 SCS 16	C9231	T9231	M9231	M9232	T9232	C9232	Arrived Feb	Caught fire	May
Class 92 SCS 17	C9233	T9233	M9233	M9234	T9234	C9234	Arrived	Operational	May
Class 92 SCS 18	C9235	T9235	M9235	M9236	T9236	C9236	Arrived	Operational	May
Class 92 SCS 19	C9237	T9237	M9237	M9238	T9238	C9238	Arrived	Operational	June
Class 92 SCS 20	C9239	T9239	M9239	M9240	T9240	C9240	Arrived	Operational	June
Class 92 SCS 21	C9241	T9241	M9241	M9242	T9242	C9242	Arrived	Operational	June
Class 92 SCS 22	C9243	T9243	M9243	M9244	T9244	C9244	Arrived	Operational	June
Class 92 SCS 23	C9245	T9245	M9245	M9246	T9246	C9246	Arrived	Operational	July
Class 92 SCS 24	C9247	T9247	M9247	M9248	T9248	C9248	Arrived	Operational	July
Class 92 SCS 25	C9249	T9249	M9249	M9250	T9250	C9250	Arrived	Operational	July
Class 92 SCS 26	C9251	T9251	M9251	M9252	T9252	C9252	Arrived	Operational	July
Class 92 SCS 27	C9253	T9253	M9253	M9254	T9254	C9254	Arrived	Operational	July
Class 92 SCS 28	C9255	T9255	M9255	M9256	T9256	C9256	Arrived	Operational	July
Class 92 SCS 29	C9257	T9257	M9257	M9258	T9258	C9258	Arrived	Operational	July
Class 92 SCS 30	C9259	T9259	M9259	M9260	T9260	C9260	Arrived	Unknown	July
Class 92 SCS 31	C9261	T9261	M9261	M9262	T9262	C9262	Arrived	Unknown	July
Class 92 SCS 32	C9263	T9263	M9263	M9264	T9264	C9264	Arrived	Operational	July
Class 92 SCS 33	C9265	T9265	M9265	M9266	T9266	C9266	Arrived	Operational	July
Class 92 SCS 34	C9267	T9267	M9267	M9268	T9268	C9268	Arrived	Temporarily grounded	July
Class 92 SCS 35	C9269	T9269	M9269	M9270	T9270	C9270	Arrived	Operational	July
Class 92 SCS 36	C9271	T9271	M9271	M9272	T9272	C9272	Arrived	Operational	July
Class 92 SCS 37	C9273	T9273	M9273	M9274	T9274	C9274	Arrived	Operational	July
Class 92 SCS 38	C9275	T9275	M9275	M9276	T9276	C9276	Arrived	Operational	July

Cars 2 and 5 are equipped with a double-arm Z-shaped pantograph.

Cars 3 and 4 are designated women's only car.

== Corruption investigation ==
The purchase of the KTM class 92 was notably under investigation by the Malaysian Anti Corruption Commission (MACC) over its tender process. In 2008, the Chinese railway manufacturer Zhuzhou Electric Locomotive Co Ltd, being the lowest bidder, was originally awarded the tender to build 3 car sets at the cost of RM 13.7 million. This figure later increased to RM 48 million per 6 car set. According to the details revealed to the press about the investigation, the re-negotiation process was held directly with the manufacturer and there was certain irregularities in pricing. The investigation is still on-going.

== Operational issues ==
There has been a number of issues related to the Class 92. In a comment by KTMB's incumbent president, Elias Kadir has noted that the class 92 is "not up to standard". In other related incidents, in which Class 92 sets malfunctioned was due reportedly to poor maintenance and non-payment to suppliers.

Poor fleet management has led to many KTM Class 92 sets to have gone without routine maintenance, thus leading to a void in manufacturer warranty. According to the Auditor-General’s Report, The sum of RM99.94 million paid by the Railway Assets Corporation (RAC) to CSR Zhuzhou Electric Locomotive Co Limited to service the six-car Electric Multiple Unit (EMU) cannot be reimbursed due to KTMB's failure in its part of sending the trains for necessary maintenance.

== Vandalism ==
Immediately, following its launch a number of KTM Class 92 were intentionally damaged, at least 20 side windows are cracked or holed, due a number of stone throwing incidents. This has culminated in a number of media reports. Despite the incidents, KTMB has no intention of upgrading the SCS to shatterproof glass to counter these incident. During the 2018 Malaysian general election, trains plastered with campaign advertising from then ruling party Barisan Nasional had their windows cracked again.

== Accidents and incidents ==
- On 15 February 2013 at 23:00, an out-of-service KTM Class 92 SCS 20 derailed near Shah Alam station while returning to Sentul depot for maintenance. No one was injured. The train was heavily damaged and was subsequently written off. SCS20 has just recently been repaired, and returned to service.
- On 15 April 2018, at around 13:00, SCS23 had a minor derail near Kuala Lumpur station, heading to Port Klang. No one was injured.
- On 23 August 2018, at approximately 6.09 am, Set SCS06 rammed into the stoppers at Port Klang Station as the driver was believed to have not secured the brakes. The train was about to start its return journey to KL Sentral station. There were no injuries reported but it caused delays on the Port Klang Line.
- On 18 October 2018, at around 06:02, a Class 26 locomotive hauling 30 wagons had crashed onto Set SCS06 (the same trainset involved at Port Klang on August 23) when it was stationary at Tanjung Malim Station. 5 passengers were reported injured with the trainset heavily damaged.
- On 8 November 2025, at around 06:01, an empty Set SCS03 overshoot at the end of track at Platform 4 in Butterworth station. No one is injured.

== Launch delays ==
The premature decay in KTM class 8X circa 2006-2012, led to a public outcry for new commuter rolling stock. Hence, there was a need for a fast-tracked tender of new trains in order to meet the rising rail passenger demand.

Originally the first set was expected to be launched in December 2011, it was later delayed to January and then February 2012. The eventual launch date for Class 92 took place on March 8, 2012.

Reports place the delay as a result of further operational testing, and driver training.

== Gallery ==
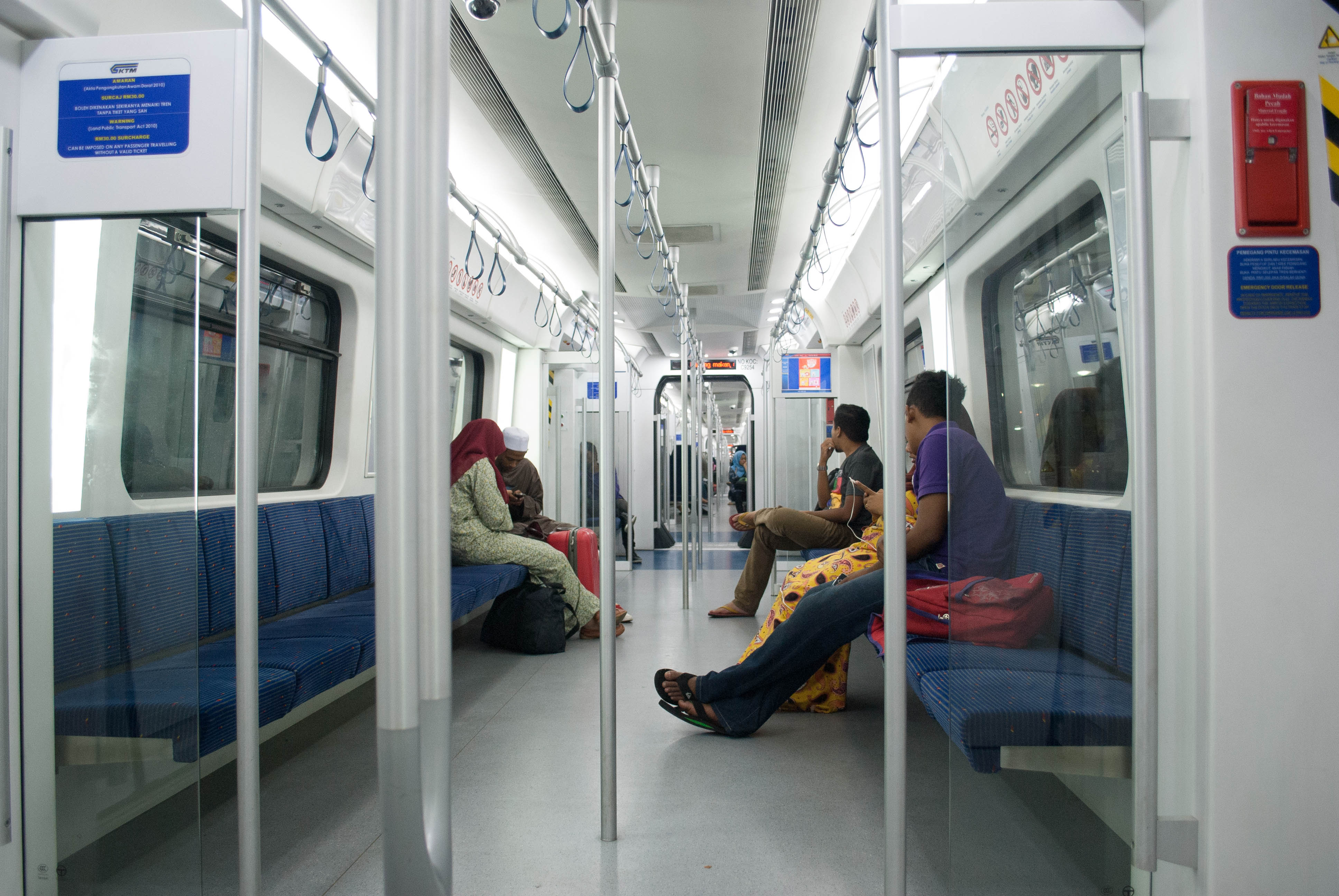
Interior of the KTM class 92, end coaches feature longitudinal seating.

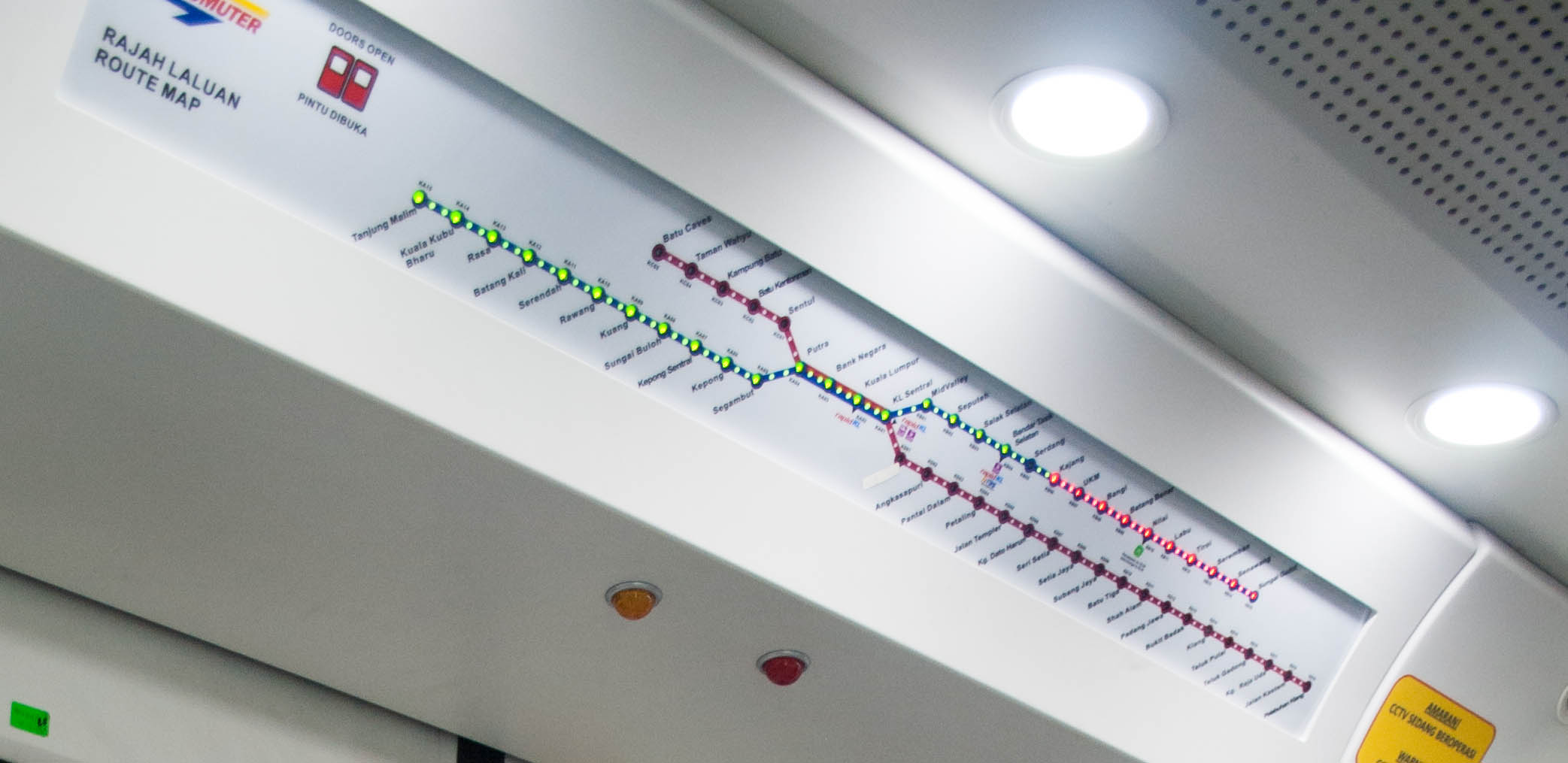
A GPS enabled route indicator

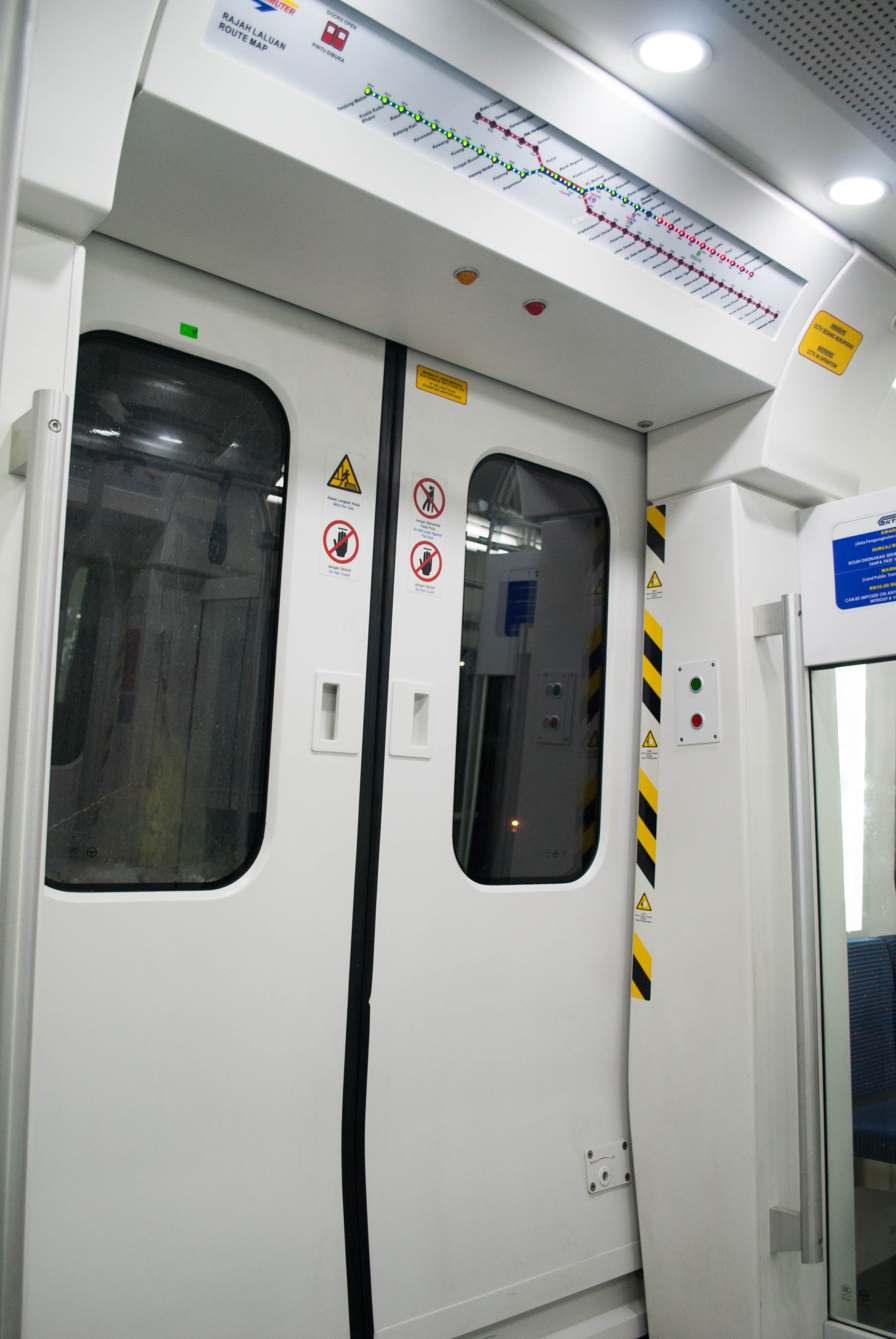
Class 92 Passenger information System

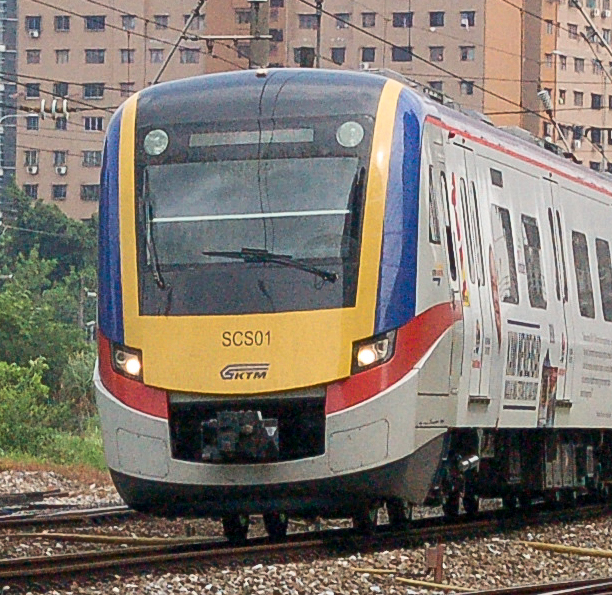
Class 92 SCS 1 at KL Sentral Junction

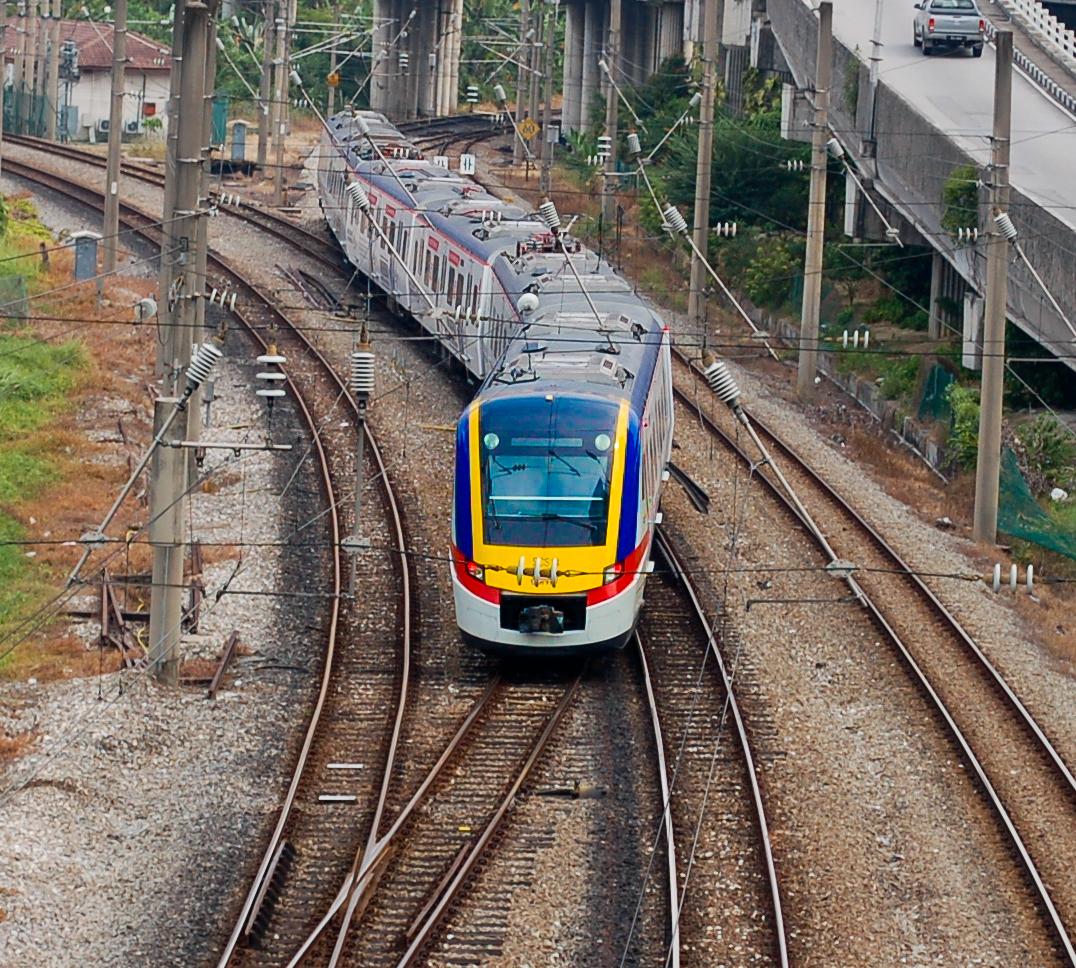
Class 92 SCS 14 at KL Sentral Junction

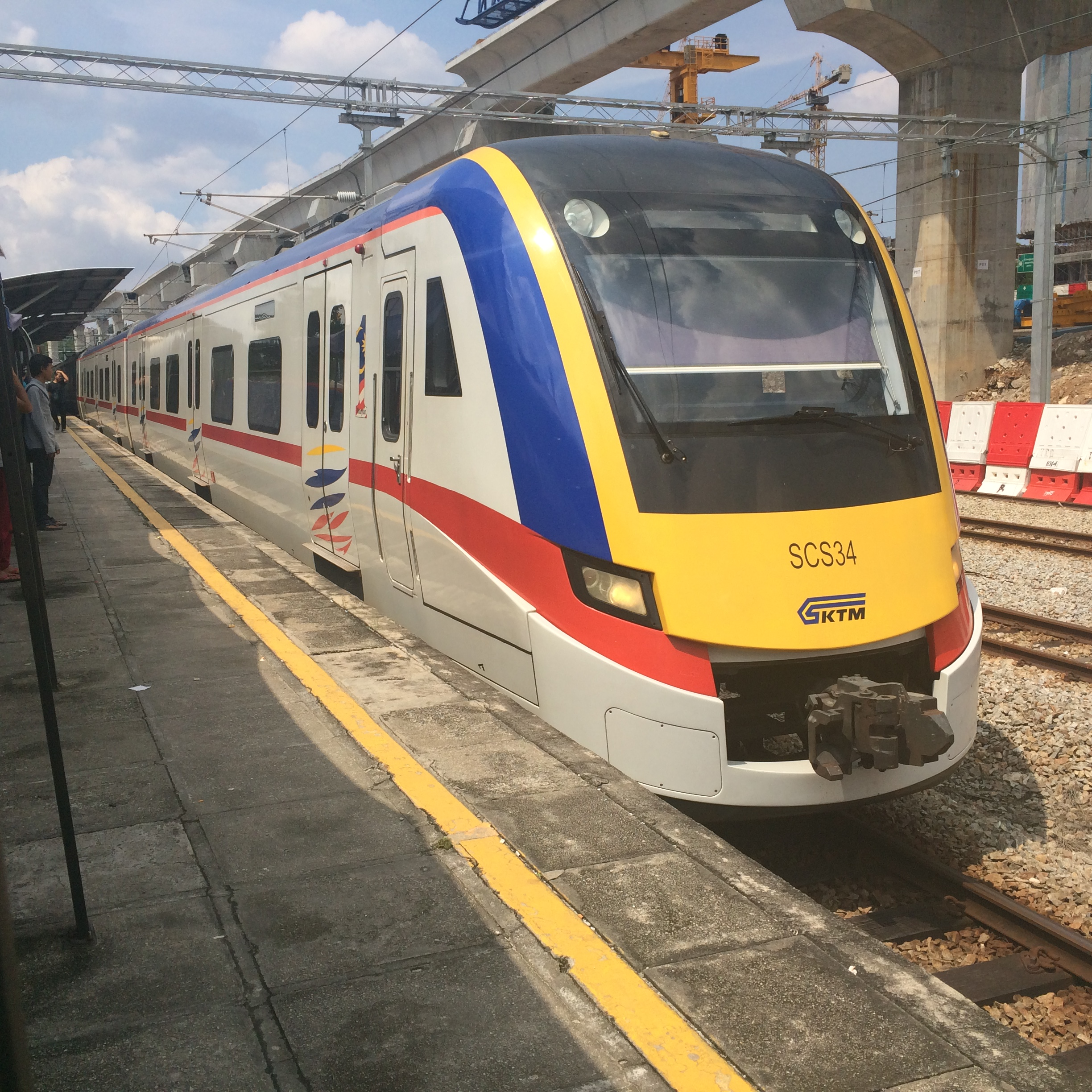
Class 92 SCS 34 at Subang Jaya
