= Persiaran Raja Muda Musa =

Road in Malaysia

Persiaran Raja Muda Musa

Route information
- Maintained by Malaysian Public Works Department
- Length: 18 km (11 mi) FT2a: 19.4 km (12.1 mi); FT2b: 8.4 km (5.2 mi)
- Existed: 1965–present
- History: Completed in 1967

Major junctions
- West end: Port Klang
- FT 103 Northport Highway; FT 180 North–South Port Link; FT 3218 Jalan Kim Chuan; FT 5 Klang–Banting Highway; FT 2 FT 5 Jalan Jambatan Kota
- East end: Klang

Location
- Country: Malaysia
- Primary destinations: Pandamaran, Northport, Southpoint, West Port

Highway system
- Highways in Malaysia; Expressways; Federal; State

Persiaran Raja Muda Musa, Federal Route 2, 2A and 2B is a major highway in Klang, Selangor, Malaysia. It connects Klang to Port Klang. It is also a main route to Port Klang. The highway was named after Raja Muda Musa, father of Sultan Sir Alaeddin Sulaiman Shah of Selangor.

== Route background ==
The Kilometre Zero of the Persiaran Raja Muda Musa service roads 2A and 2B are located at Port Klang. It has connections to Federal Highway and KESAS.

== Landmarks ==
- Traffic Police Station
- Pantai Medical Centre
- Harbour Place Shopping Centre
- Tai Thong Restaurant
- Klang Furniture Mall
- La Salle School, Klang
- Hin Hua High School
- Pandamaran Sports Complex
- Port Klang Futsal
- Sri Sunderaraja Perumal Temple
- Masjid Kampung Raja Uda, Pelabuhan Klang
- Masjid Jamek Samadiah Pelabuhan Klang]
- Crystal Crown Hotel, Pelabuhan Klang

At most sections, the Federal Route 2, 2A and 2B was built under the JKR R5 road standard, with a speed limit of 90 km/h.

== Junction lists ==
The entire route is located in Klang District, Selangor.

Legend:

- I/C - Interchange, I/S - Intersection, RSA - Rest and service area, OBR - Overhead bridge restaurant, R/R - Restaurant and rest plaza, L/B - Layby, V/P - Vista point, TN - tunnel, T/P - Toll plaza, BR - Bridge
- C - Cloverleaf, S - Stack, T-A - Trumpet-A, T-B - Trumpet-B, DT - Directional-T/Y, SDT - Semi-Directional-T/Y, P-Y - Partial-Y, D - Diamond, P-C - Partial cloverleaf, D-D - Diverging diamond, D-R - Direct ramp

=== FT2 Main highways ===
| Location | km | mi | Exit | Name | Destinations | Notes |
|---|---|---|---|---|---|---|
| Port Klang | | | | Port Klang; Southpoint | Southpoint – Port Klang Ferry Terminal (to Pulau Ketam, International ferry terminal to Dumai and Tanjungbalai (Indonesia)); Jalan Syahbandar – Department of Marine Peninsula Malaysia Port Klang office, Royal Selangor Yacht Club | T-junctions |
| Port Klang | | | Railway crossing | | | |
| Port Klang | | | | Port Klang; Port Klang Komuter station | Port Klang Komuter station – KTM Komuter | |
| Port Klang | | | | Lorong Limbungan | Lorong Limbungan | T-junctions |
| Port Klang | | | | Jalan Kelab | Jalan Kelab | T-junctions |
| Port Klang | | | | Port Klang; Immigration Department of Malaysia Port Klang office | | |
| Port Klang | | | | Port Klang; Royal Malaysian Customs Port Klang office | | |
| Port Klang | | | | Jalan Limbungan | Jalan Limbungan | T-junctions |
| Port Klang | | | | Jalan Pelabuhan Selatan | Jalan Pelabuhan Selatan | T-junctions |
| Port Klang | | | | Port Klang; Port Klang Clinic | Port Klang Clinic | |
| Port Klang | | | | Jalan Pekeliling | Jalan Pekeliling | T-junctions |
| Port Klang | | | | Port Klang; Port Klang Bus & Taxi Terminal | | |
| Port Klang | | | | Jalan Sungai Aur | Jalan Sungai Aur | T-junctions |
| Port Klang | 0.0 | 0.0 | 201 | Port Klang; Port Klang I/C | FT 103 Northport Highway – Northport, Bandar Sultan Sulaiman, Tanjung Harapan; Jaalan Kem – North-South Port Link, Pulau Indah, West Port | Junctions |
| Port Klang | | | | Port Klang | Port Klang Samadiah Jamek Mosque | |
| Klang | | | 202 | Jalan Kastam/Sungai Keladi I/S | Jalan Kastam; Jalan Sungai Keladi | Junctions |
| Klang | | | 203 | Kim Chuan I/S | Jalan Petola – Kampung Raja Uda; FT 3218 Jalan Kim Chuan – Pandamaran, Tengku Ampuan Rahimah Hospital | Junctions |
| Klang | | | 204 | Lebuh Turi I/C | Jalan Hilir; Lebuh Turi – Bandar Bukit Tinggi | Diamond interchange |
| Klang | | | 205 | Simpang Lima Roundabout I/C | Jalan Raya Barat; Jalan Tengku Kelana – Musauddin Bridge, Klang town centre Palace Ground – Jalan Istana, Istana Alam Shah, Sultan Abdul Aziz Shah Royal Gallery, Sultan Sulaiman Mosque; FT 5 Klang–Banting Highway – Pandamaran, Banting, Bandar Bukit Tinggi, Bandar Botanic, Al-Rahimiah Mosque, Tengku Ampuan Rahimah Hospital | Roundabout interchange |
| Klang | | | Through to FT 2/ FT 5 Jalan Jambatan Kota | | | |
1.000 mi = 1.609 km; 1.000 km = 0.621 mi

=== FT2a Service road A ===
| Location | km | mi | Exit | Name | Destinations | Notes |
|---|---|---|---|---|---|---|
| Port Klang | | | | Jalan Saga | Jalan Saga | |
| Port Klang | | | | Hin Hua High School | | |
| Port Klang | | | | Jalan Jelutong | Jalan Jelutong | |
| Port Klang | | | | SMK La Salle | Taman Palm Grove | |
| Port Klang | | | | Regent International School | Jalan Kopi | |
| Port Klang | | | | Taman Chi Liung | Lebuh Menalu | |
| Port Klang | | | | Sri Sundaraja Perumal Temple | Jalan Mastika | |
| Port Klang | | | | Lebuh Turi | Lebuh Turi | |
| Port Klang | | | | Taman Radzi | | |
| Port Klang | | | | Taman Suria | | |
| Port Klang | | | | Kampung Teluk Gadong Besar | | |
| Port Klang | | | | Pandamaran | FT 3218 Jalan Kim Chuan – Pandamaran, Tengku Ampuan Rahimah Hospital | Junctions |
| Port Klang | | | | Pandamaran Sports Complex | | |
| Port Klang | | | | SK Tengku Bendahara Azman 1 | Sekolah Kebangsaan Tengku Bendahara Azman 1 | |
| Port Klang | 0.0 | 0.0 | | Port Klang; Jalan Sungai Keladi | | |
1.000 mi = 1.609 km; 1.000 km = 0.621 mi

=== FT2b Service road B ===
| Location | km | mi | Exit | Name | Destinations | Notes |
|---|---|---|---|---|---|---|
| Port Klang | 0.0 | 0.0 | | Port Klang; Jalan Kastam | | |
| Port Klang | | | | SK St Anne's Convent | Sekolah Kebangsaan St Anne's Convent | |
| Port Klang | | | | Port Klang Fire Station | | |
| Port Klang | | | | Kampung Raja Uda | | |
| Port Klang | | | | Kampung Raja Uda Mosque | | |
| Port Klang | | | | Taman Mohd Yamin | | |
| Port Klang | | | | Jalan Yamin | Jalan Yamin – Kampung Teluk Kecil, Jalan Sungai Bertih | Junctions |
| Port Klang | | | | Taman Gembira | | |
| Port Klang | | | | Jalan Puding | Jalan Puding | |
1.000 mi = 1.609 km; 1.000 km = 0.621 mi

== See also ==
- Federal Highway
- Malaysia Federal Route 2
