= Jalan Jambatan Kota =

Road in Malaysia

Jalan Jambatan Kota

Route information
- Maintained by Malaysian Public Works Department
- Length: 4 km (2.5 mi)
- Existed: 1965–present
- History: Completed in 1967

Major junctions
- South end: Bulatan Simpang Lima
- FT 2 Persiaran Raja Muda Musa; FT 5 Klang–Banting Highway; FT 5 Federal Route 5 FT 2 Federal Highway
- Northeast end: Bulatan Simpang Empat

Location
- Country: Malaysia
- Primary destinations: Port Klang, Banting, Klang, Kuala Lumpur

Highway system
- Highways in Malaysia; Expressways; Federal; State

Jalan Jambatan Kota, Federal Route 2 and 5, is a major highway in Klang, Selangor, Malaysia. It connects Simpang Lima Roundabout interchange until 100 Roundabout interchange.

== History ==
In 2019, the Member of the Selangor State Legislative Assembly (MLA) for Pandamaran Tony Leong Tuck Chee had questioned about the Jalan Jambatan Kota widening status.

The Third Klang Bridge project was initiated to alleviate chronic congestion on the Kota Bridge Road FT2, caused by high traffic volumes between Jalan Kapar FT5, Kuala Langat, and Port Klang. By connecting FT5 to FT2 via Tanjung Syawal and Jalan Sungai Bertih, the project allows motorists to bypass Klang town centre entirely, significantly reducing travel times. Phase 1 of the project was completed on 15 June 2017. A proposal for the 6km Phase 2 extension, which links Jalan Sungai Bertih to Persiaran Raja Muda Musa, was submitted in February 2019 for implementation under the 11th Malaysia Plan (RMK11) in 2020.

== Features ==
- Kota Bridge, first double-decked bridge in Malaysia
- One of the most congested roads in Klang

=== Overlaps ===
- FT5 Malaysia Federal Route 5 (Jalan Kapar/Klang–Banting Highway): Simpang Lima roundabout interchange until Klang Flyover Roundabout interchange

== Junction lists ==
The entire route is located in Klang District, Selangor.

Legend:

- I/C - Interchange, I/S - Intersection, RSA - Rest and service area, OBR - Overhead bridge restaurant, R/R - Restaurant and rest plaza, L/B - Layby, V/P - Vista point, TN - tunnel, T/P - Toll plaza, BR - Bridge
- C - Cloverleaf, S - Stack, T-A - Trumpet-A, T-B - Trumpet-B, DT - Directional-T/Y, SDT - Semi-Directional-T/Y, P-Y - Partial-Y, D - Diamond, P-C - Partial cloverleaf, D-D - Diverging diamond, D-R - Direct ramp

Location	km	mi	Exit	Name	Destinations	Notes
Klang			Through to FT 2 Persiaran Raja Muda Musa			
Klang			205	Simpang Lima Roundabout I/C	Jalan Raya Barat; Jalan Tengku Kelana – Musauddin Bridge, Klang town centre Palace Ground (Jalan Istana) – Istana Alam Shah, Sultan Abdul Aziz Royal Gallery. Sultan Sulaiman Mosque; FT 5 Klang–Banting Highway – Pandamaran, Banting, Bandar Bukit Tinggi, Bandar Botanic, Al-Rahimiah Mosque, Tengku Ampuan Rahimah Hospital	Roundabout interchange Western terminus of concurrency with FT5
Klang				Sultan Alam Shah Building	Sultan Alam Shah Building – Klang City Council (MPKlg) main headquarters, Kota Raja Mahadi	Northbound
Klang			206	Jalan Kota Exit	Jalan Kota – Town centre, Istana Alam Shah, Sultan Abdul Aziz Royal Gallery, Sultan Sulaiman Mosque	Southbound
Klang			Klang River Bridge (Kota Bridge, Dataran Jambatan Kota)			
Klang			207	Jalan Pasar Exit	Jalan Pasar – Emporium Makan	Closed
Klang			208	Klang; Klang flyover Klang Town Centre I/C	FT 5 Jalan Kapar – Kapar, Kuala Selangor, Sabak Bernam	Eastern terminus of concurrency with FT5
Klang			208	Klang; 100 Roundabout I/C	Jalan Batu Tiga – Town centre, Meru, Kapar, Kuala Selangor, Istana Alam Shah, Sultan Sulaiman Mosque, Al-Rahimiah Mosque, Tengku Ampuan Rahimah Hospital	Roundabout interchange
Klang			Through to FT 2 Federal Highway			
1.000 mi = 1.609 km; 1.000 km = 0.621 mi: Closed/former; Concurrency terminus

== See also ==
- Federal Highway
- Malaysia Federal Route 2
- Malaysia Federal Route 5
