= Raja Muda Nala Bridge, Klang =

Klang Third Bridge Jambatan Ketiga Klang
- Carries: Motor vehicles
- Crosses: Klang River
- Official name: Malay: Jambatan Raja Muda Nala
- Maintained by: Klang Municipal Council (MPK)

Characteristics
- Design: Balanced cantilever box girder
- Total length: 2,525 meters
- Width: 4-lane carriageway
- Longest span: 1,200 meters

History
- Designer: Malaysian Public Works Department (JKR)
- Constructed by: Cergas Murni Sdn Bhd
- Opened: 2017

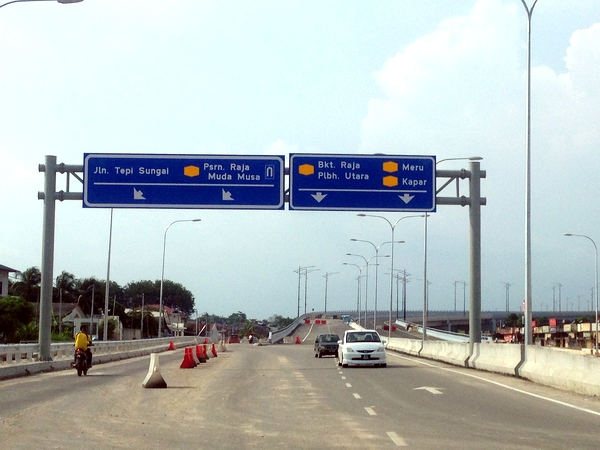
Entrance to the Klang third bridge from the south (Jalan Sungai Bertih)

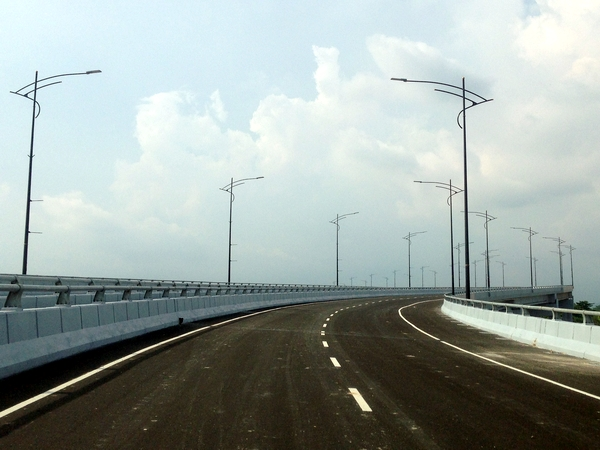
On the Klang third bridge from the south (Jalan Sungai Bertih) towards the north (Jalan Goh Hock Huat)

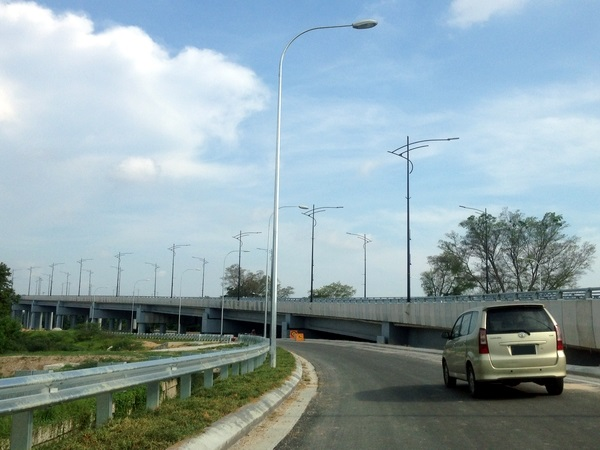
Underpass U-turn at the Klang third bridge on the north side

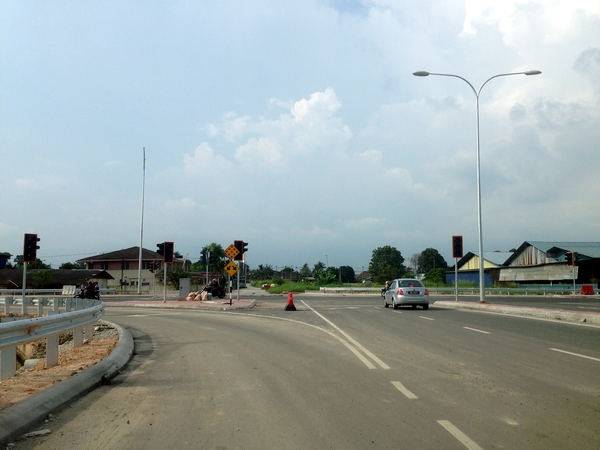
Traffic intersection at the end of the Klang third bridge (north side) towards Jalan Goh Hock Huat, Kapar and Meru

The Jambatan Raja Muda Nala, also known as Klang Third Bridge (Jambatan Ke-3 Klang) is a modern engineering infrastructure in the international port city of Klang in the state of Selangor, Malaysia. Built at a cost of RM230 million, the Klang Third Bridge complements the two existing bridges in Klang, namely the Kota Bridge and the Musaeddin (Tengku Kelana) Bridge. All three bridges cut across the Klang River, connecting the northern and southern parts of Klang.

On 24 May 2017, the Klang Third Bridge was opened for traffic.

On 19 November 2017, The Sultan of Selangor, Sultan Sharafuddin Idris Shah officially opened the Klang Third Bridge which was built at a cost of RM199 million and named it Jambatan Raja Muda Nala (Raja Muda Nala Bridge). Raja Muda Nala was the eldest son of the first Sultan of Selangor, Sultan Sallehuddin Shah.

== History ==
The Klang Third Bridge project was first mooted in early 2008. Based on the state Public Works Department survey, about 43,000 vehicles used the Musaeddin (Tengku Kelana) Bridge whilst 150,000 vehicles ply the Kota Bridge daily. With the increasing traffic, there was a dire need to construct the third bridge for Klang.

A ground-breaking ceremony of the bridge project was officiated on 4 March 2008 jointly by then Selangor Menteri Besar Datuk Seri Dr Mohd Khir Toyo and Malaysian former works minister Datuk Seri S. Samy Vellu. However, the project did not take off as it was interrupted by a change of the state government following the general election which saw the collapse of the Barisan Nasional state government in Selangor.

In 2014, the bridge project was resurrected when former Selangor Menteri Besar Tan Sri Khalid Ibrahim announced that the Pakatan Harapan state government had set aside RM300 million for the construction of the Klang Third Bridge. The completion of the bridge was delayed twice due to technical problems in land acquisition, relocation of a nearby temple and also the construction of a government health clinic.

On 1 April 2020, Klang Third Bridge was closed to reduce people's movement as part of the enforcement of the Malaysian movement control order (MCO). It was then reopened on 4 May 2020 after the Malaysian Government eased MCO restrictions under a Conditional MCO (CMCO), which allowed certain business sectors to resume operations.

== Features and connectivity ==
The Klang Third Bridge was constructed using the sophisticated balanced cantilever box girder technology, and the project was being carried out by Syarikat Cergas Murni Sdn. Bhd. through an open tender system with the contract value of RM199 million, under the close supervision of the state Public Works Department (JKR). The cantilever bridge with four-lane carriageway spans 1,200 meters with an elevation of 150 meters above the Klang River, with a total length of 2,525 meters connected to a 3.8 km upgraded roads on both sides of the bridge.

The 1.2 km-long bridge connects the northern and southern parts of Klang through Jalan Goh Hock Huat and Jalan Sungai Bertih respectively. The bridge is aimed to facilitate traffic between Klang north (Kapar, Meru, Federal Highway, NKVE) and Klang south (Port Klang, Bandar Bukit Tinggi, Bandar Botanic, KESAS, SKVE), hence re-routing the traffic from entering the Klang town centre. It is expected that over 60,000 vehicles will use the bridge daily, reaching its full capacity of 120,000 vehicles daily by the year 2032.

== Gallery ==
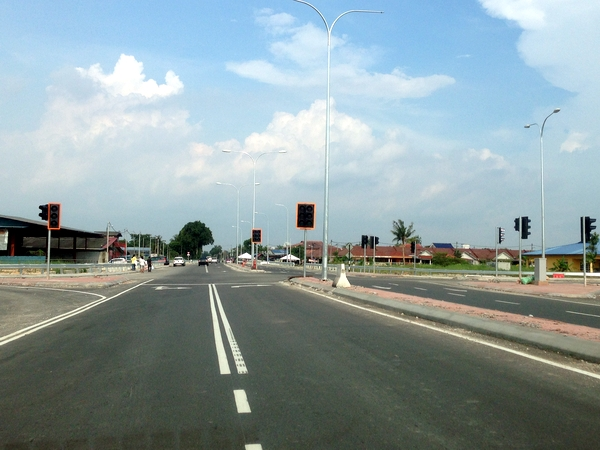
Traffic intersection at Jalan Goh Hock Huat leading to the Klang third bridge (north side)

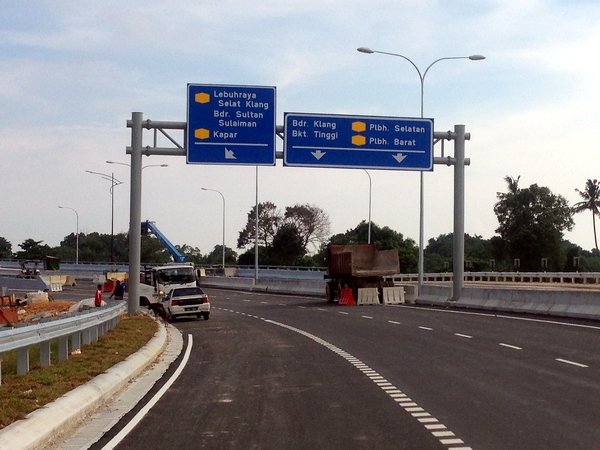
Entrance to the Klang third bridge from the north (Jalan Goh Hock Huat) towards Klang south

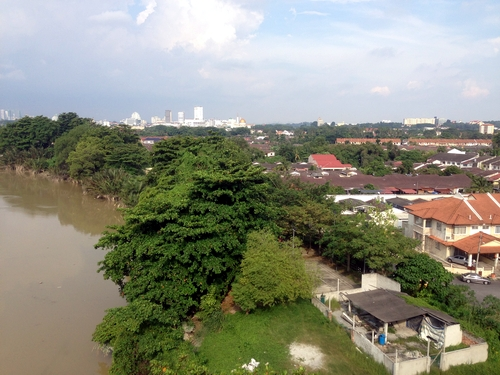
On the Klang third bridge (Klang river on the left, Klang town at the background)

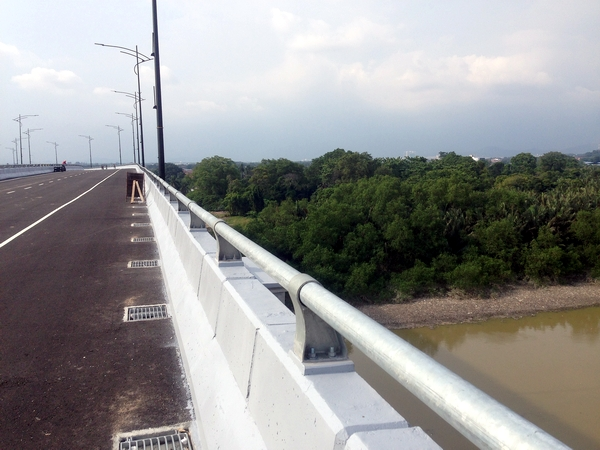
On the Klang third bridge (Klang river on the right)
