= Taman Sri Andalas =

Human settlement in Malaysia

Coordinates: 3.02033°N 101.4495698°E

Taman Sri Andalas is a township in the district of Klang in Selangor, Malaysia.

It is located near one of the main ports of Malaysia; Port Klang, as well as surrounding townships such as Bandar Bukit Tinggi, Bandar Botanic, and the Klang city center.

Klang's main government hospital, Tengku Ampuan Rahimah Hospital (HTAR) is also located in close proximity with the township.

== Governance ==
Taman Sri Andalas is administratively governed by the Klang Royal City Council (MBDK).

In federal politics, the township is mainly situated within the Kota Raja (P111) parliamentary constituency, represented by Mohamad Sabu of the National Trust Party (AMANAH), who also serves as the party's federal president. At the state legislative level, the area falls under the Sungai Kandis (N49) state constituency, represented by Wan Dzahanurin Ahmad of the Perikatan Nasional (PN) party.

== Transportation ==
Taman Sri Andalas is mainly served by Federal Route 5 (Persiaran Tengku Ampuan Rahimah), which connects residents to neighbouring townships such as the aforementioned Bandar Bukit Tinggi towards the south and Klang city center towards the north. Other notable roads serving the township include Jalan Tun Abdul Razak, Jalan Sri Sarawak, and Jalan Tun Dr. Ismail.

The area is also integrated into the Klang Valley rail transit network following the official commencement of the LRT Shah Alam Line in June 2026, serviced by a dedicated elevated rail station named the Seri Andalas LRT station.
