= Malaysia Federal Route 3218 =

Road in Malaysia

Federal Route 3218
- Jalan Batu Unjur / Jalan Kim Chuan
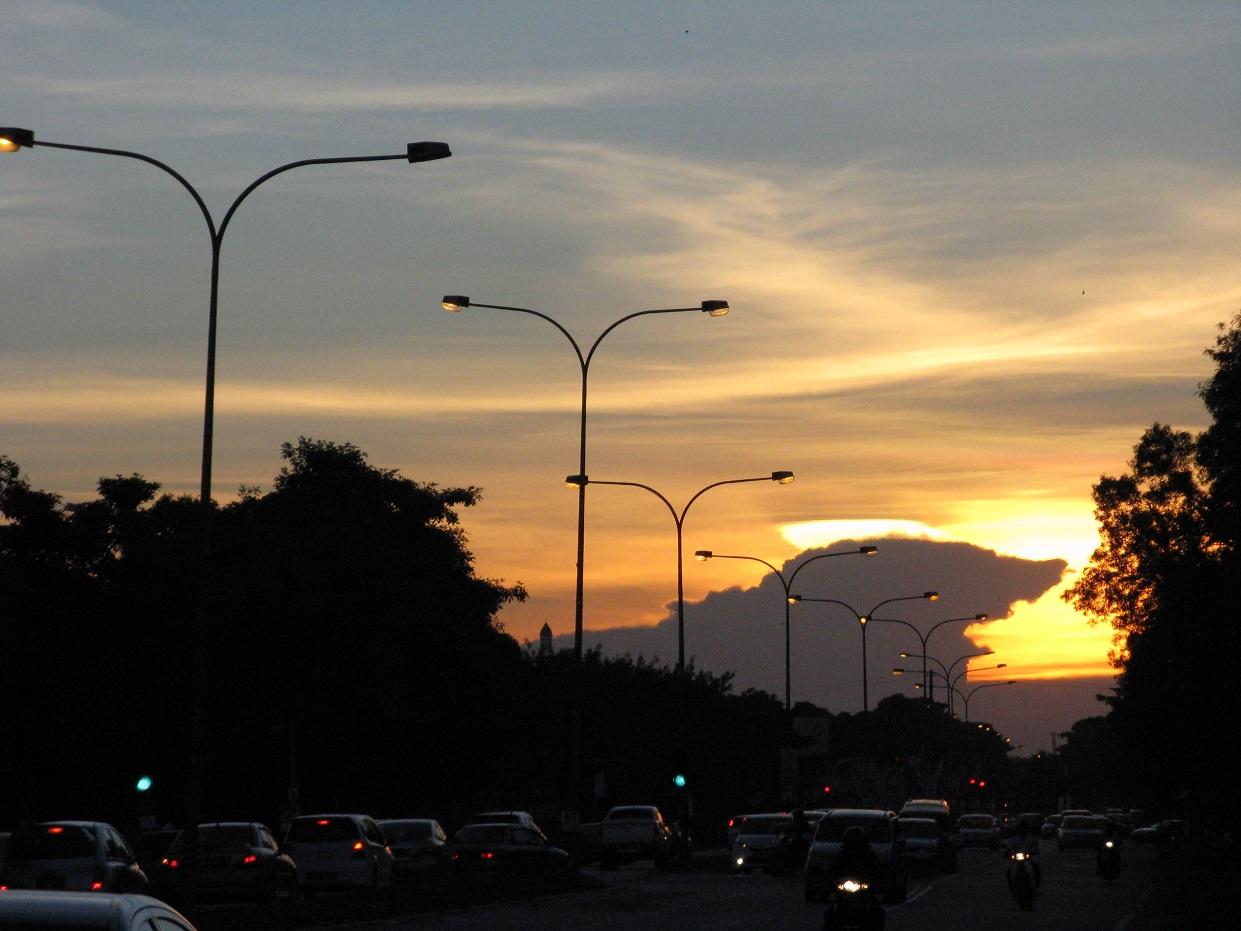

Route information
- Maintained by Malaysian Public Works Department
- Length: 11.539 km (7.170 mi)

Major junctions
- West end: Pandamaran
- FT 2 Persiaran Raja Muda Musa; FT 5 Klang–Banting Highway
- East end: Klang–Banting Highway

Location
- Country: Malaysia
- Primary destinations: Port Klang, Banting

Highway system
- Highways in Malaysia; Expressways; Federal; State

Jalan Kim Chuan, or Jalan Batu Unjur, Federal Route 3218 (formerly Selangor State Route B8), is an industrial federal road in Klang District, Selangor, Malaysia.

At most sections, the Federal Route 3218 was built under the JKR R5 road standard, with a speed limit of 90 km/h (56 mph).

== Junction lists ==
The entire route is located in Klang District, Selangor.

Legend:

- I/C - Interchange, I/S - Intersection, RSA - Rest and service area, OBR - Overhead bridge restaurant, R/R - Restaurant and rest plaza, L/B - Layby, V/P - Vista point, TN - tunnel, T/P - Toll plaza, BR - Bridge
- C - Cloverleaf, S - Stack, T-A - Trumpet-A, T-B - Trumpet-B, DT - Directional-T/Y, SDT - Semi-Directional-T/Y, P-Y - Partial-Y, D - Diamond, P-C - Partial cloverleaf, D-D - Diverging diamond, D-R - Direct ramp

=== Jalan Batu Unjur ===
| Location | km | mi | Name | Destinations | Notes |
|---|---|---|---|---|---|
| Pandamaran | | | Pandamaran | FT 2 Persiaran Raja Muda Musa – Klang city centre, Shah Alam, Kuala Lumpur, Port Klang, South Port, North Port | T-junctions |
| Pandamaran | | | Taman Bayu Emas | Jalan Raja Lumu | T-junctions |
| Pandamaran | | | Taman Bayu Emas | Jalan Cengkeh | T-junctions |
| Pandamaran | | | Taman Bayu Emas | Jalan Young | T-junctions |
| Pandamaran | | | Taman Chi Leong | Jalan Mesra – Taman Chi Leong | T-junctions |
| Pandamaran | | | Taman Bayu Perdana | Persiaran Pegaga | Junctions |
| Pandamaran | | | Klang–Banting Highway | FT 5 Klang–Banting Highway – Klang city centre, Kapar, Kuala Selangor, Tengku Ampuan Rahimah Hospital, Banting, Port Dickson; Shah Alam Expressway – Pulau Indah, Subang Jaya. Petaling Jaya, Sri Petaling, Cheras, Kuantan, Kuala Lumpur International Airport (KLIA), Johor Bahru | T-junctions |
1.000 mi = 1.609 km; 1.000 km = 0.621 mi
