= La Salle School, Klang =

La Salle School Klang

Location
- Persiaran Raja Muda Musa; Klang, Selangor, 41200; Malaysia; 3°1′57″N 101°26′17″E

Information
- Other names: SMK La Salle Klang
- Type: National Primary School and National Secondary School
- Motto: Lux Luceat Vobis (Let Your Light Shine)
- Established: 1940
- School district: Klang
- Principal: En. Franklin a/l Xavier Francis Pereira
- Grades: Form One - Form 5
- Gender: Boys
- Colours: Green, Yellow, White, Red
- Yearbook: Evolution (2014) (secondary school)
- Affiliation: La Sallian Educational Institutions
- Website: sites.google.com/moe-dl.edu.my/smklasalleklang

La Salle School, Klang is a boys' mission school in Klang, Selangor, Malaysia. It is located at Persiaran Raja Muda Musa, Klang and neighbours three other schools: Hin Hua High School (Private), SMK Tengku Ampuan Rahimah, and SK (1)&(2) Simpang lima.

== History ==
La Salle School, Klang is one of the oldest schools in Klang. It was established by the Roman Catholic Church in 1940 to provide education for Malayan boys regardless of race and religious affiliation. It is one of 26 De La Salle mission schools in Malaysia. Commonly known as the La Salle School, it has long consisted of a primary school and a secondary school that are administered separately. The primary and secondary schools were administered as a single unit until 1964

=== Private school ===
Rev. Father Louis Guittart of France was the first principal of the school. The school was originally known as St. Bernadette's School but was renamed La Salle Institution in 1950 when the school was placed under the administration of the De La Salle Brothers, a teaching congregation with schools and universities across the world. In 1952, the school was renamed La Salle School. Today, the primary school is formally known in Malay as Sekolah Kebangsaan La Salle and the secondary school is formally known as Sekolah Menengah Kebangsaan La Salle. They are now both national schools administered by the Malaysian Ministry of Education but remain under the ownership of the Archdiocese of Kuala Lumpur which appoints members of the school's Board of Governors. Like all Malaysian "English-medium" missionary schools, the payment of fees for primary and secondary school students at La Salle was required until the school fully integrated a "Malay-medium language instruction" which it had by the 1980s.

The school was headed by a Brother Director of the De La Salle Brothers until 1989 when Rex C.C. Michael became the first principal not of consecrated life. The last Brother Director to serve the school was the Rev. Bro. Michael Wong FSC. The students and alumni of La Salle School, Klang call themselves 'Lasallians'. The school motto, 'Lux Luceat Vobis' is Latin for 'let your light shine' (Matthew 5:16). The school anthem is "All Through Our Classes" while "Hail Alma Mater" is used as the prefects' anthem. The school sports houses are Celestine, Harold, Leo, Edmund and Philip.

== School identity ==
=== School Motto ===
Lux Luceat Vobis (Let Your Light Shine)

The Administrative Team, Teachers, and Support Staff of SMK La Salle Klang in 2026

== Principals ==
Mr. Franklin A/L Xavier Francis Pereira (2025-now)

Year service began	Year service ended	Name of Principal
1940	1947	Rev. Fr. L. Guittart
1947	1951	Rev. Fr. John Edmund
1952	1957	Rev. Bro. Stephen Phillip
1958	1963	Rev. Bro. Leo Manicasami
1964	1964	Rev. Bro. Celestine Jennings
1965	1967	Rev. Bro. John Mathew Neo
1968	1976	Rev. Bro. Harold Reynolds
1977	1982	Rev. Bro. Cassian Pappu
1983	1985	Rev. Bro. David Liao
1986	1988	Rev. Bro. Michael Wong
1989	1993	Rex C.C. Michael
1993	1994	K. Sadasivam
1995	1998	Shum Kwok Hong
1998	2003	Zainon Kasim
2003	2006	Hasimah Karim
2006	2010	Lee Lily
2010	2012	Hajah Adliyah Ramli
2012	2014	Ding Sooi Chong
2015	2017	Loh Kea Yu
2017	2020	Woon Boon Yiat
2020	2025	Manokaran a/l Ponniah
2026	-	Franklin a/l Xavier Francis Pereira

== Head Prefect ==
Head School Prefect (AirilSharf Haris) on the left, and Assistant Head School Prefect (Hemraaj A/L Kathiravan) on the right.

Years of Service	Name of the Head Prefect
1992	Ganesalingam s/o Thirugnanam
1993	Albert Tan Tin Yau
2000	Lee Leong Hui
2001	Anantharajah s/o Davarajah
2002	Tan Lu Jian
2003	Andy Ong Chi Horng
2004	Lam Ka-Mun
2005	Kenneth Yap
2006	Loh Kwong Weng
2007	V. Dakshnamoorthy
2008	Alvin Tea Qwa En
2009	Chua Yu Min
2010	Mohamed Ashwin Khan
2011	Sukhdip Singh Dhillon
2012	Sebastian Sim Why Jean
2013	Bryan Koh Kah Wai
2014	Prathiv Rao
2015	Paktha Rao
2016	Sanjay Unni
2017	Subash a/l Gunasekaran
2018	Leong Hymm
2019	Chai Keng Huat
2020	Lohitt Paramisvaran
2021	Jeevakugan Murthy
2022	JagaTheeshwar
2023	Aravindran RajivPandiyan
2024	Tharshenthiran a/l Santhiran
2025	Moheshvar Ganeson
2026	Airilsharf Haris Bin Shahrul Adi

panorama of Smk lasalle klang

== Chairman of the Parent-Teacher Association (YDP PIBG) ==
Information for the years prior to 2001 is unavailable.

year service began	final year of service	Name of the Chairman
2001	2003	Mohd. Satar Surittiman
2004	2016	Oormila d/o Raveendran
2017	now	Jayandra a/l Kunakunrukody

== School Badges ==
School Badges Previously Used

Bil.	Tarikh digunakan	Jenis Lencana
1)	The SMK LASALLE KLANG badge is also still used today	
2)	23 July 2013	
3)	16 June 2007	

School Alumni Badge

Bil.	Nama	Lencana
1)	OLAK (Old Lasallians Association Klang)	OLAK Badge

== School Gallery ==
SMK La Salle Klang Administrative Team 2026

SMK La Salle Klang Teachers, 2026

SMK La Salle Klang School Prefects 2026

SMK La Salle Klang Pembimbing Rakan Sebaya 2025

SMK La Salle Klang School Pengawas Pusat Sumber (PSS) 2025

SMK La Salle Klang Canteen Prefects 2025

SMK La Salle Klang Class Presidents' Council 2025

Skim Pinjaman Buku Teks SMK La Salle Klang 2025 (SPBT)

SMK La Salle Klang Dengue Squad 2025

== See also ==
- Persiaran Raja Muda Musa
- SMK Tengku Ampuan Rahimah, Klang
- Hin Hua High School Klang

== School Address ==
Sekolah Menengah Kebangsaan La Salle
Persiaran Raja Muda Musa
Selangor, Malaysia
Waktu Operasi: 8.00 pagi - 4.00 petang
Telefon = 603-3371 7469
Fax = 603-3373 6905
