= Glenmarie Cove =

Human settlement in Malaysia

Coordinates: 2°58′47.9″N 101°24′49.5″E

Glenmarie Cove in Klang, Malaysia.

Glenmarie Cove is a 200-acre (0.81 km^{2}) exclusive resort style water-front freehold gated & guarded residential enclave located in the south of the royal town of Klang in the state of Selangor, Malaysia. It is adjacent to other new and modern townships such as Bandar Botanic and Bukit Tinggi.

Developed by DRB-HICOM, the residential area is developed based on the riverfront resort living concept along the serene banks of the Langat River. Glenmarie Cove's low-density development features 2 km of river view frontage with only bungalows and semi-detached homes surrounded by landscaped parklands and lagoons.

Glenmarie Cove falls under the jurisdiction of the Klang Municipal Council (MPK).
