= Seri Andalas LRT station =

Railway station in Klang, Malaysia

SA22 Seri Andalas
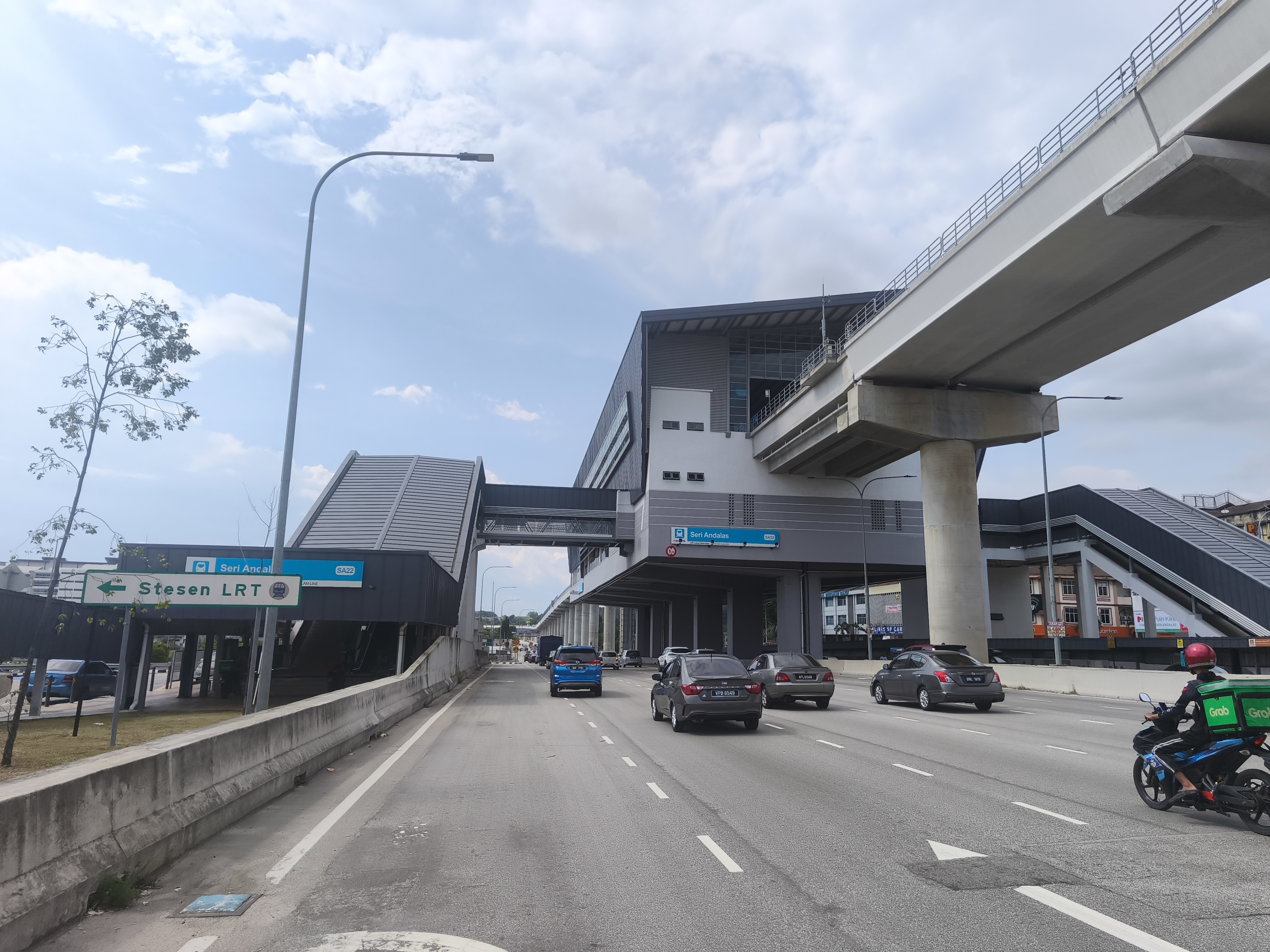

General information
- Other names: Malay: سري اندالس (Jawi); Chinese: 斯里安达拉斯; Tamil: செரி அண்டலாஸ்
- Location: Taman Sri Andalas, Klang; Selangor; Malaysia
- System: Rapid KL
- Owner: Prasarana Malaysia
- Operator: Rapid Rail
- Line: 11 Shah Alam Line
- Platforms: 2 side platforms
- Tracks: 2

Construction
- Structure type: Elevated
- Parking: Available, 550 parking bays.
- Accessible: Yes

Other information
- Station code: SA22

History
- Opened: 29 June 2026; 4 months ago

Services
Preceding station		Following station
Taman Selatan towards Bandar Utama	Shah Alam Line	Klang Jaya towards Johan Setia
Location

The Seri Andalas LRT station is a light rapid transit (LRT) station that serves the city of Klang in Selangor, Malaysia. The elevated station is located in Taman Sri Andalas, forming part of the Klang Valley Integrated Transit System and serves as one of the stations on the Shah Alam line.

== History ==
This is the twenty-second station along the RM9 billion line project, with the line's maintenance depot located in Johan Setia, Klang. It has facilities such as kiosks, restrooms, elevators, taxi stands, and bus stands. The station commenced operations along with the Shah Alam line on 29 June 2026.

== Locality landmarks ==
This station is located along Persiaran Tengku Ampuan Rahimah, a part of Federal Route 5. It is also near the north section of Jalan Tun Abdul Razak and the south sections of Jalan Batu Unjur and Jalan Tun Sambanthan. Major landmarks around this station include:

- Tengku Ampuan Rahimah Hospital (HTAR)
- Hospital Bersalin Razif
- Taman Sri Andalas
- Batu Unjur
- Kolej Vokasional Klang
- Taman Bayu Tinggi
- Taman Bayu Perdana
- Taman Chi Liung
- Pandamaran
- Taman Rakyat

== Station features ==
Like every other station on the Shah Alam line, this station adopts the elevated station design. There are three floors, with two side platforms on the second floor, the station concourse on the first floor, and two entrances/exits on the ground floor. There are also facilities designed for the disabled, including tactile floor blocks, disabled toilets, braille on elevator buttons, and low-height elevator buttons and customer service centre counters for wheelchair users. There is a Park N' Ride facility with a capacity of 550 vehicles.

=== Station layout ===
L2
Platform

Level

Side platform, doors will open on the left
→ Platform 1: 11 Shah Alam Line towards SA01 Bandar Utama (Taman Selatan)
← Platform 2: 11 Shah Alam Line towards SA26 Johan Setia (Klang Jaya)
Side platform, doors will open on the left
L1
Concourse
Faregates to paid area, escalators, lifts, ticketing machines, kiosks, customer service counter
G
Ground Level
Park N' Ride, Feeder Bus Stop, Taxi Lay-By

=== Exits and entrances ===
This station has two entrances. Entrance A serves Taman Bayu Perdana, which also leads to the station's Park N' Ride facility, and the Tengku Ampuan Rahimah Hospital. Entrance B serves Taman Sri Andalas.

Shah Alam Line station
Entrance	Location	Destination	Picture
A	Taman Bayu Perdana	Feeder bus stop, taxi and private vehicle lay-by Park N' Ride, Taman Bayu Perdana, Tengku Ampuan Rahimah Hospital (HTAR), Kolej Vokasional Klang	
B	Taman Sri Andalas	Feeder bus stop, taxi and private vehicle lay-by Taman Sri Andalas, Persiaran Tengku Ampuan Rahimah (southbound)	

== Bus Services ==
The bus services serving this station are Wawasan Sutera bus route 730 (to Klang and Banting) and Smart Selangor bus route KLG1 (to Klang bus hub only).

While there are no Rapid KL operated feeder buses, Rapid On-Demand (ROD) demand-responsive transit services are available, serving Taman Sri Andalas and Bandar Sentosa.

== Gallery ==
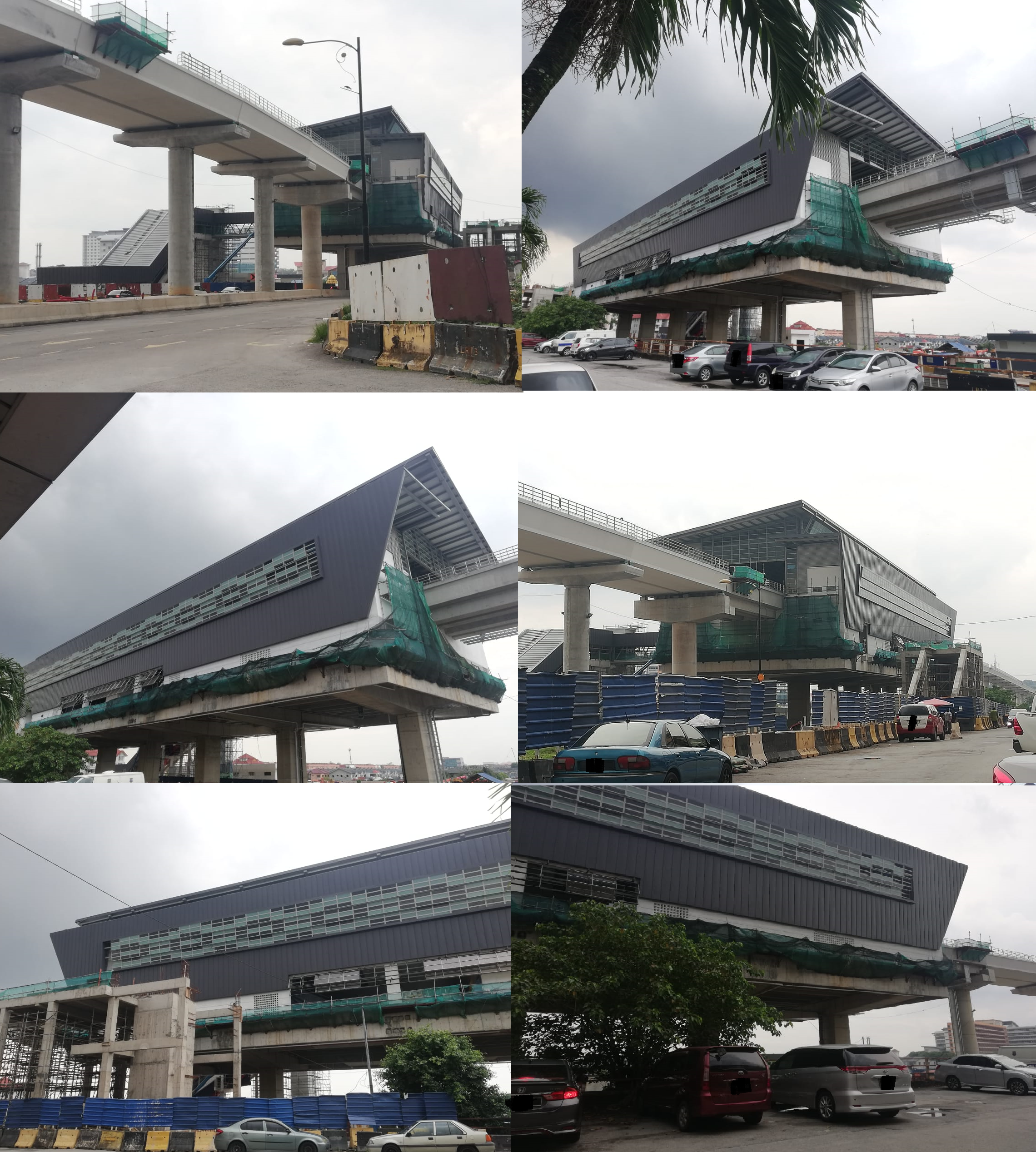
Views of the station under construction in 2021

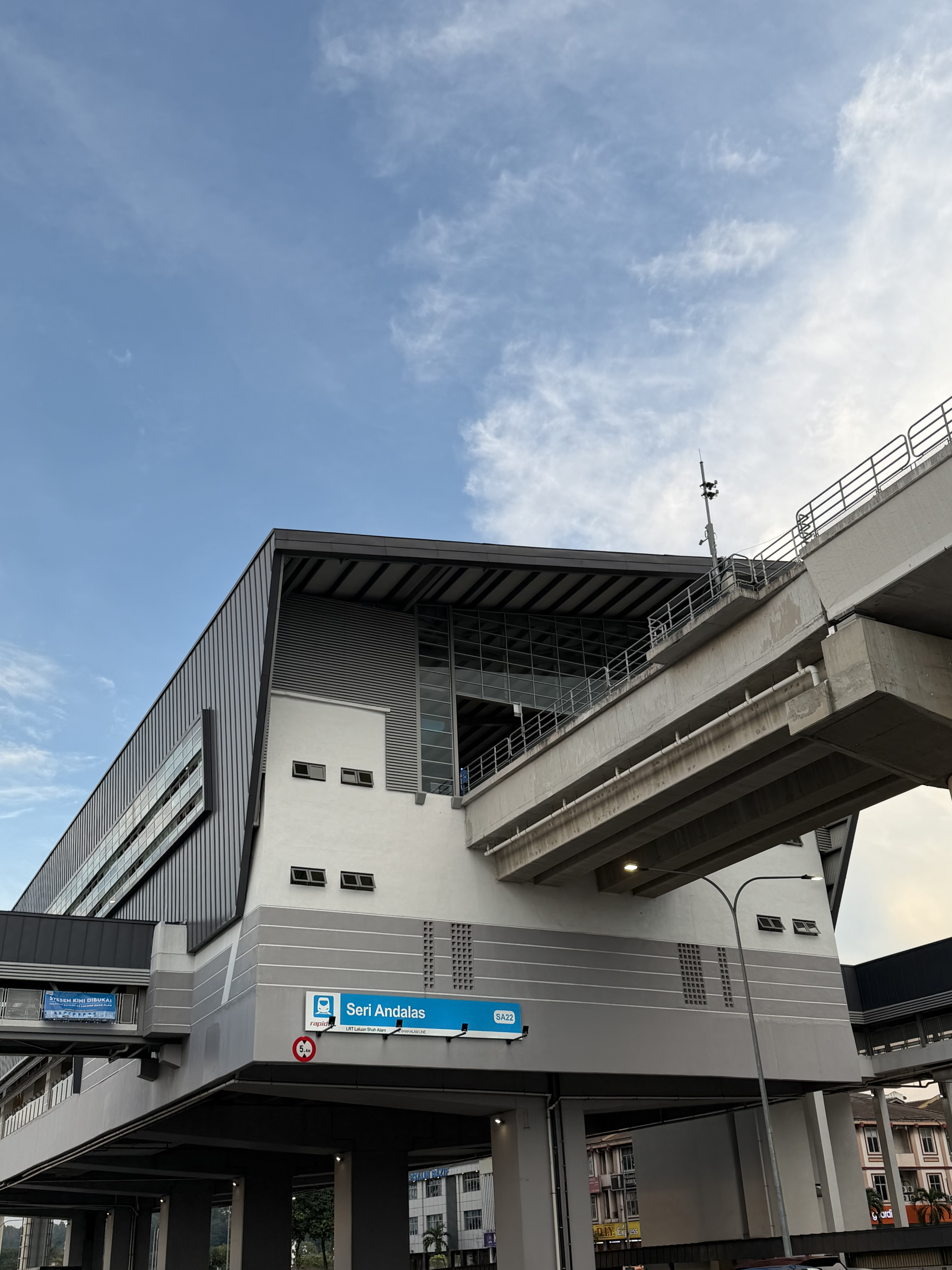
The station's close-up view nearby Pintu A, 2 July 2026
