= Taman Selatan LRT station =

Light Rail Transit station in Malaysia

SA21 Taman Selatan
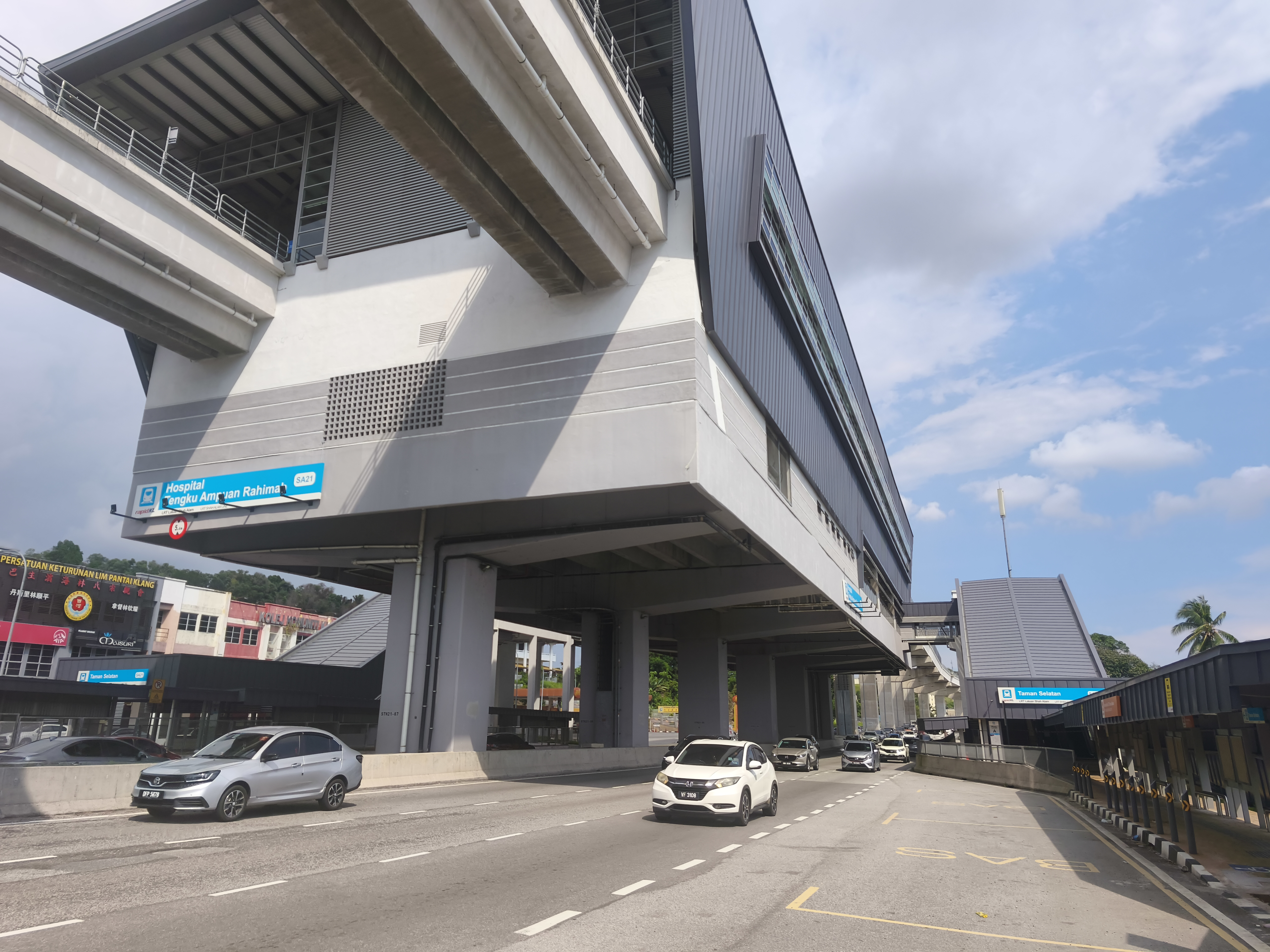

General information
- Other names: Malay: تامن سلاتن (Jawi); Chinese: 南方镇; Tamil: தாமான் செலாத்தான்
- Location: Taman Selatan, Klang; Selangor; Malaysia
- System: Rapid KL
- Owner: Prasarana Malaysia
- Operator: Rapid Rail
- Line: 11 Shah Alam Line
- Platforms: 1 island platform
- Tracks: 2

Construction
- Structure type: Elevated
- Parking: Not available
- Accessible: Yes

Other information
- Station code: SA21

History
- Opened: 29 June 2026; 4 months ago

Services
| Preceding station | | Following station |
|---|---|---|
| Jambatan Kota towards Bandar Utama | Shah Alam Line | Seri Andalas towards Johan Setia |
Location

The Taman Selatan LRT station is a light rapid transit (LRT) station located in Taman Selatan, Klang in Selangor, Malaysia. It is as one of the stations on the Shah Alam line. The station is an elevated station, forming part of the Klang Valley Integrated Transit System.

This is the twenty-first station along the RM9 billion line project, with the line's maintenance depot located in Johan Setia, Klang. It has facilities such as kiosks, restrooms, escalators, elevators, taxi stands, and feeder buses. Operations for the Shah Alam line and this station commenced on 29 June 2026.

From April to June 2026, this station was briefly renamed to Hospital Tengku Ampuan Rahimah, which, at 27 characters (excluding spaces), would have overtook Taman Perindustrian Puchong for the longest station name in the Klang Valley Integrated Transit System. However, it was reverted back to its original name.

== Locality landmarks ==
The station is located on top of Persiaran Tengku Ampuan Rahimah, which is part of Federal Route 5, and one the main roads serving the small township and neighboring areas. It is also close to the Lorong Jelutong commercial area and the south section of Persiaran Seraya.

The station serves the neighbourhoods of Taman Selatan, Taman Petaling, Taman Chi Liung, Lipat Kajang, Kampung Jawa, Teluk Pulai, Kampung Attap, and Kawasan 1 Bandar Klang. Major landmarks around this station include:

- Taman Selatan, Klang
- Southern Park Commercial Center (Pusat Komersial Taman Selatan)
- Sekolah Khas Klang
- Kolej Komuniti Klang
- Euro Hotel
- SMK Tengku Ampuan Rahimah Klang (STAR)
- SMK La Salle Klang
- SK La Salle Klang
- Hin Hua High School
- SK (1) & (2) Simpang Lima, Klang
- Regent International School Klang
- Taman Palm Grove
- Taman Chi Lieung

== Station Features ==
The station adopts the standard elevated station design for the Shah Alam Line, with one island platform above the concourse level and two entrances/exits on ground level. There are also facilities designed for the disabled, including tactile floor blocks, disabled toilets, braille on elevator buttons, and low-height elevator buttons and customer service centre counters for wheelchair users.

=== Station layout ===
| L2 | Platform; Level | → Platform 1: 11 Shah Alam Line towards SA01 Bandar Utama (Jambatan Kota) |
| L2 | Platform; Level | Island platform, doors will open on the right |
| L2 | Platform; Level | ← Platform 2: 11 Shah Alam Line towards SA26 Johan Setia (Seri Andalas) |
| L1 | Concourse | Faregates to paid area, escalators, lifts, ticketing machines, kiosks, customer service counter |
| G | Ground Level | Feeder Bus Stop, Taxi Lay-By |

=== Exits and entrances ===
The station has two entrances. Entrance A is situated on the western side of Persiaran Tengku Ampuan Rahimah which connects commuters towards the western corridor of the Taman Selatan commercial center and housing areas. Entrance B is situated on the eastern side of Persiaran Tengku Ampuan Rahimah and connects commuters to the eastern corridor of the Taman Selatan commercial center.

Shah Alam Line station
| Entrance | Location | Destination | Picture |
| A | Western side of Persiaran Tengku Ampuan Rahimah | Feeder bus stop, taxi and private vehicle lay-by Southern Park Commercial Center (west) | |
| B | Eastern side of Persiaran Tengku Ampuan Rahimah | Feeder bus stop, taxi and private vehicle lay-by Southern Park Commercial Center (east); Masjid Jamek Ar-Rahimiah | |

== Bus Services ==
=== Feeder buses ===
| | Origin | Destination | Via | Connecting to | Notes |
|---|---|---|---|---|---|
| T721 | SA21 Taman Selatan | Pandarmaran | Persiaran Seraya; Persiaran Pegaga; Jalan Batu Unjur; Jalan Besar Pandarmaran; Jalan Raja Lumu | | |

=== Other buses ===
| | Origin | Destination | Via | Connecting to | Notes |
|---|---|---|---|---|---|
| 730 | Hentian Klang | Banting | | | It got a bus stop at Taman Selatan, Seri Andalas, Klang Jaya, Bandar Bukit Tinggi and Johan Setia LRT stations in the same bus line. |
| KLG1 | SJK (C) Kong Hoe | Hospital Tengku Ampuan Rahimah | | | Nearby the Taman Selatan LRT station. |

City bus services like the Wawasan Sutera bus route 730 (to Klang and Banting) and Smart Selangor bus route KLG1 (to Klang bus hub only) are also available.

In addition, Rapid On-Demand (ROD) demand-responsive transit services are also available, serving Teluk Gadong and KTM Klang.

== Gallery ==
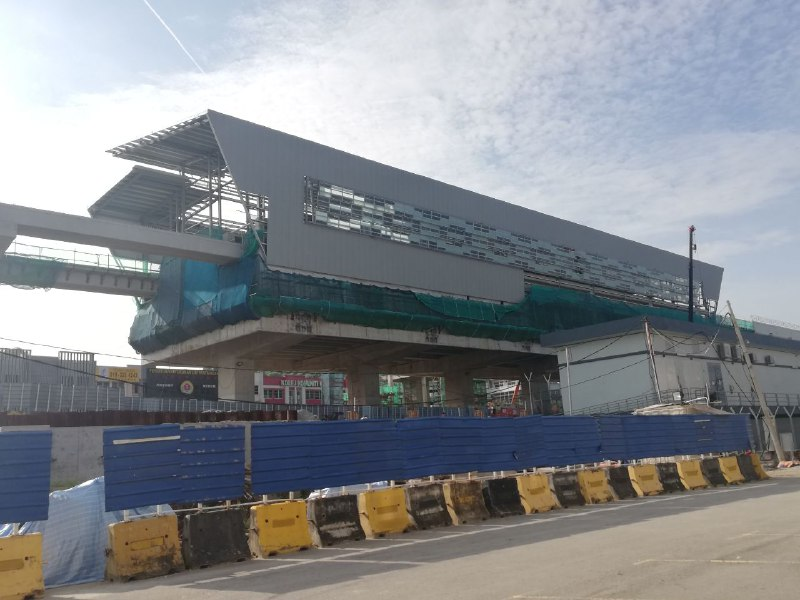
Side view of the station under construction, July 2021

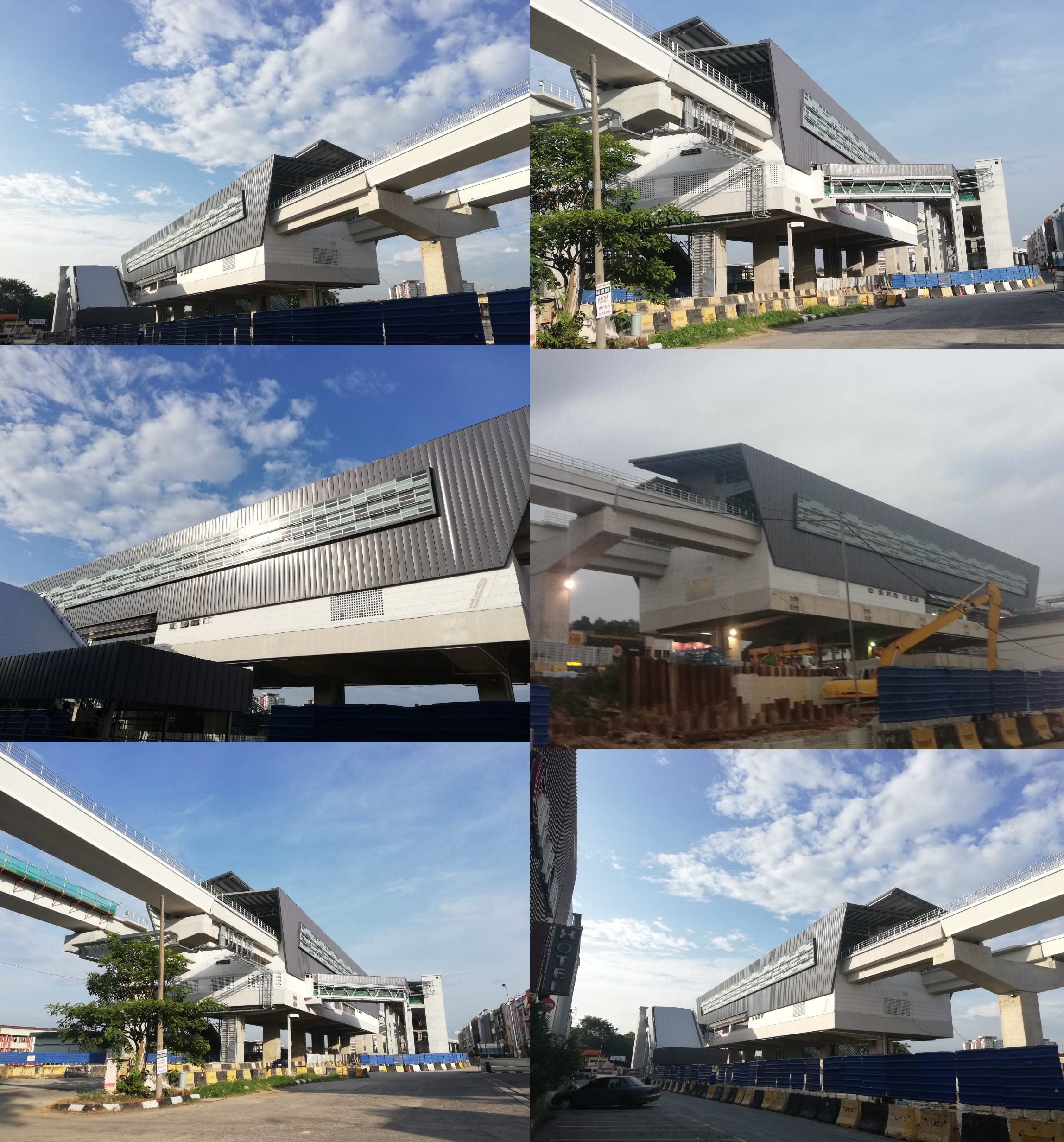
Views of the station under construction, December 2021

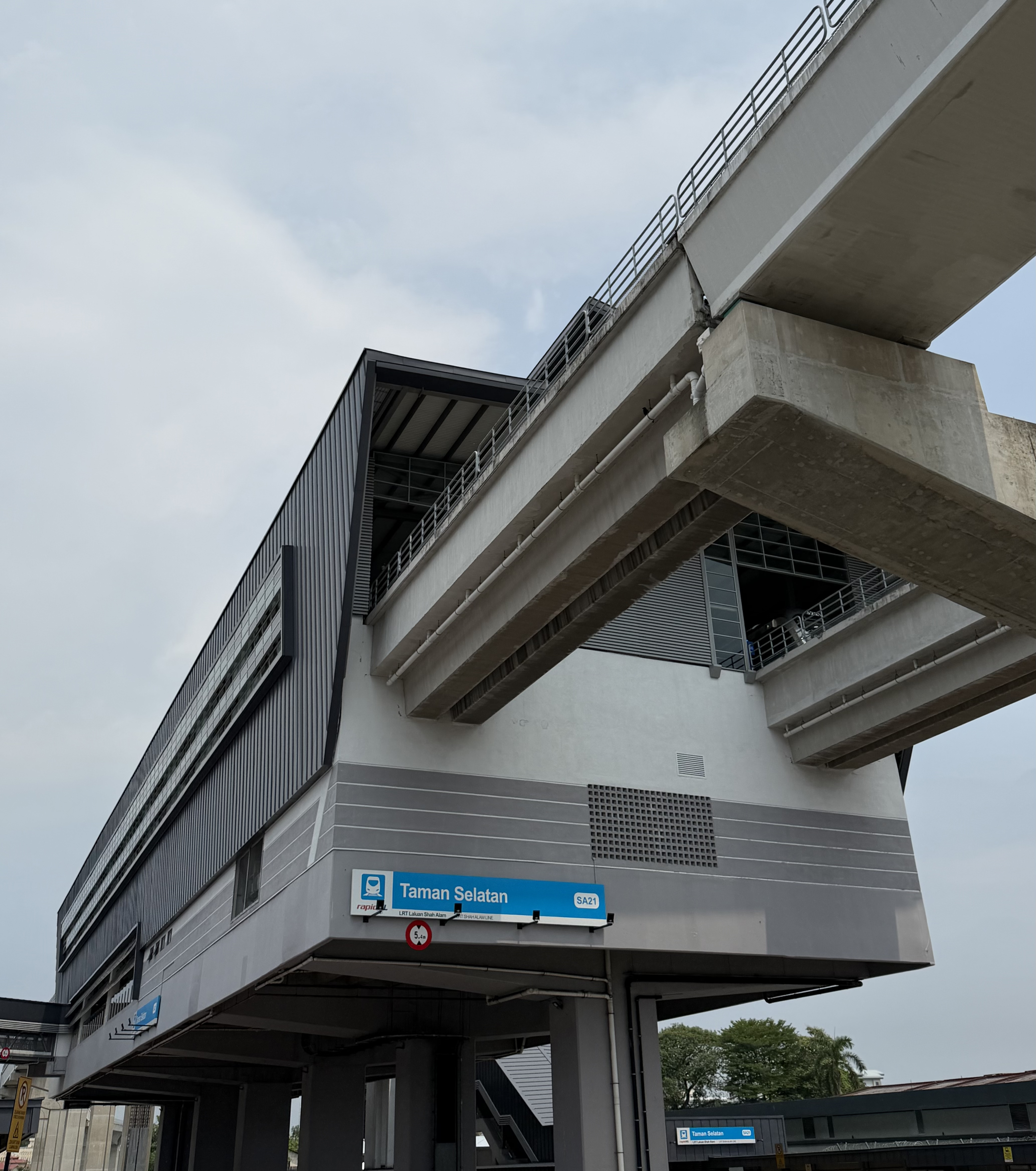
Outview of the station from Entrance B, July 2026

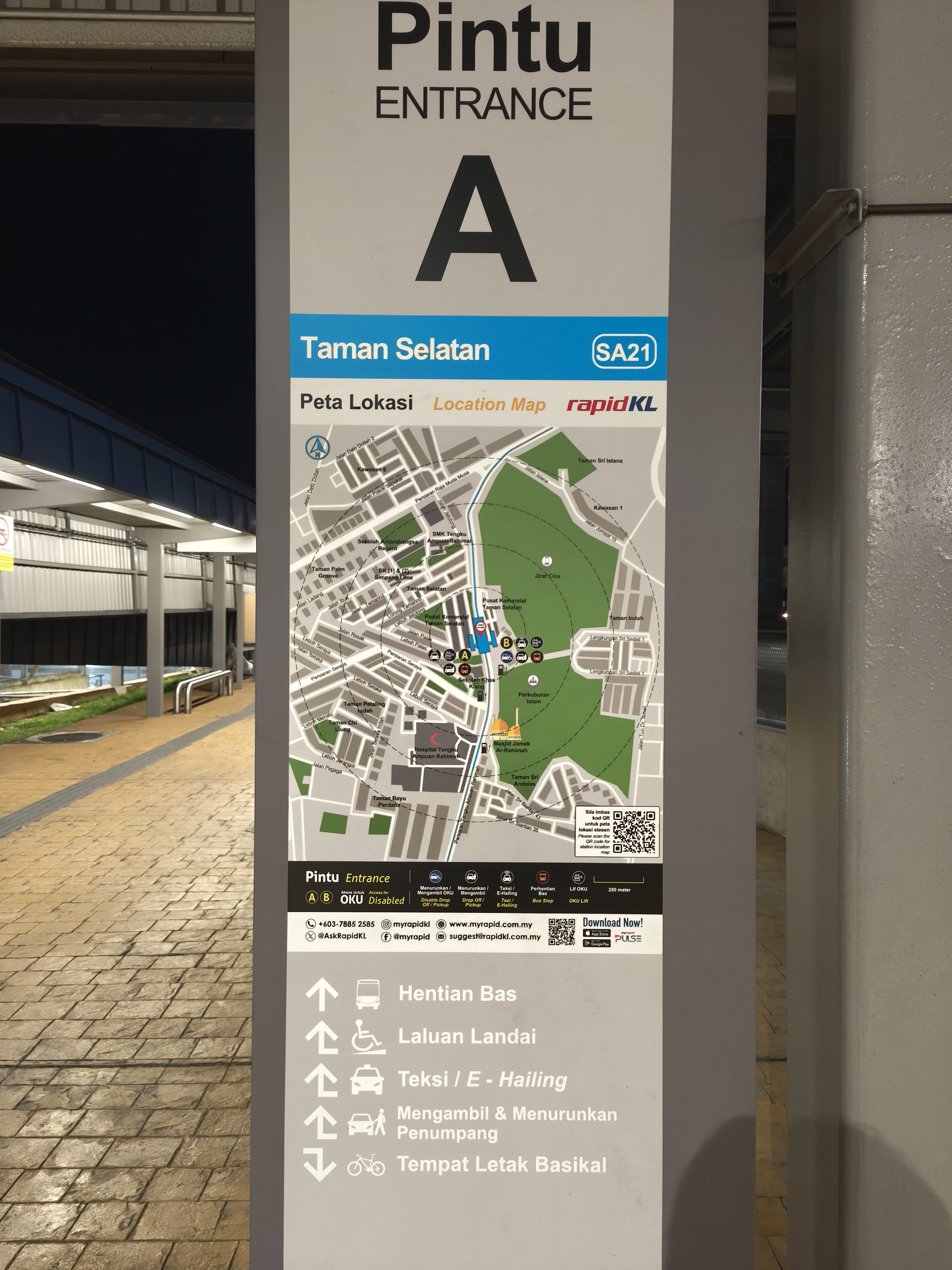
Station location map of Entrance A at night, May 2026

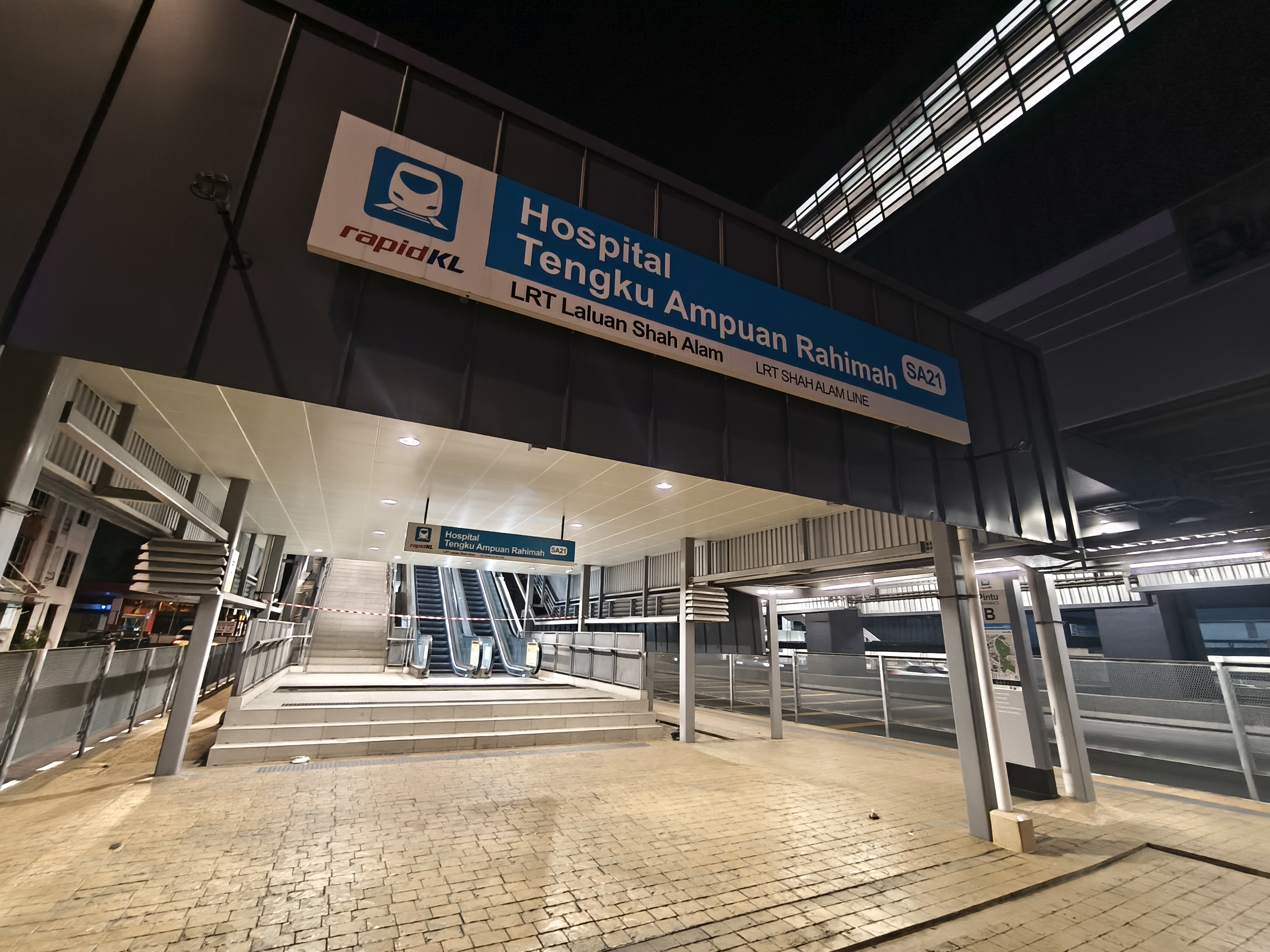
View of the station's Entrance B at night with the old name, May 2026

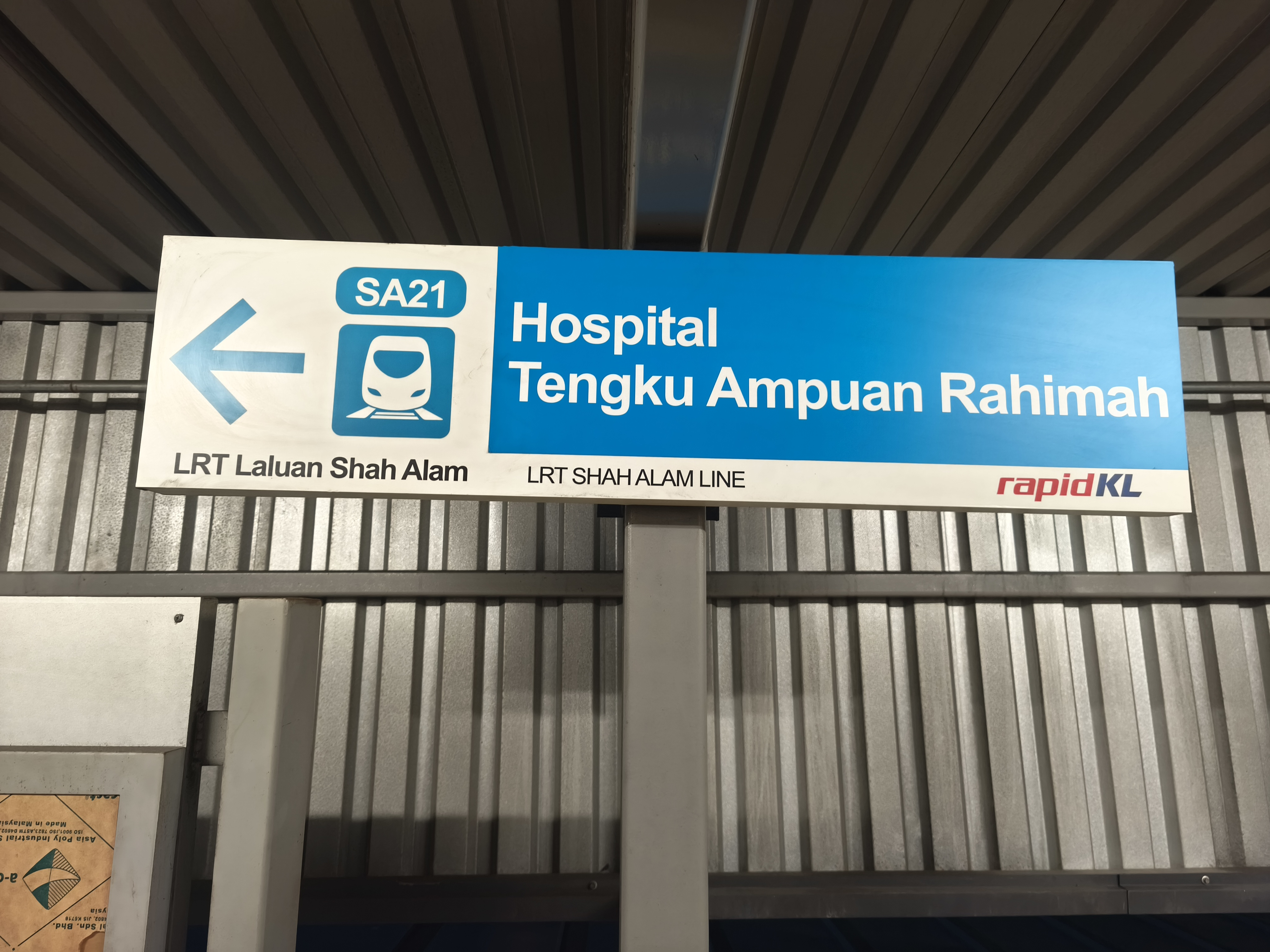
View of the station's signboard at night with the old name, May 2026
