= Sri Sundararaja Perumal Temple =

- Malay: Kuil Sri Sundaraja Perumal; Tamil: ஸ்ரீ சுந்தரராஜ பெருமாள் கோயில்
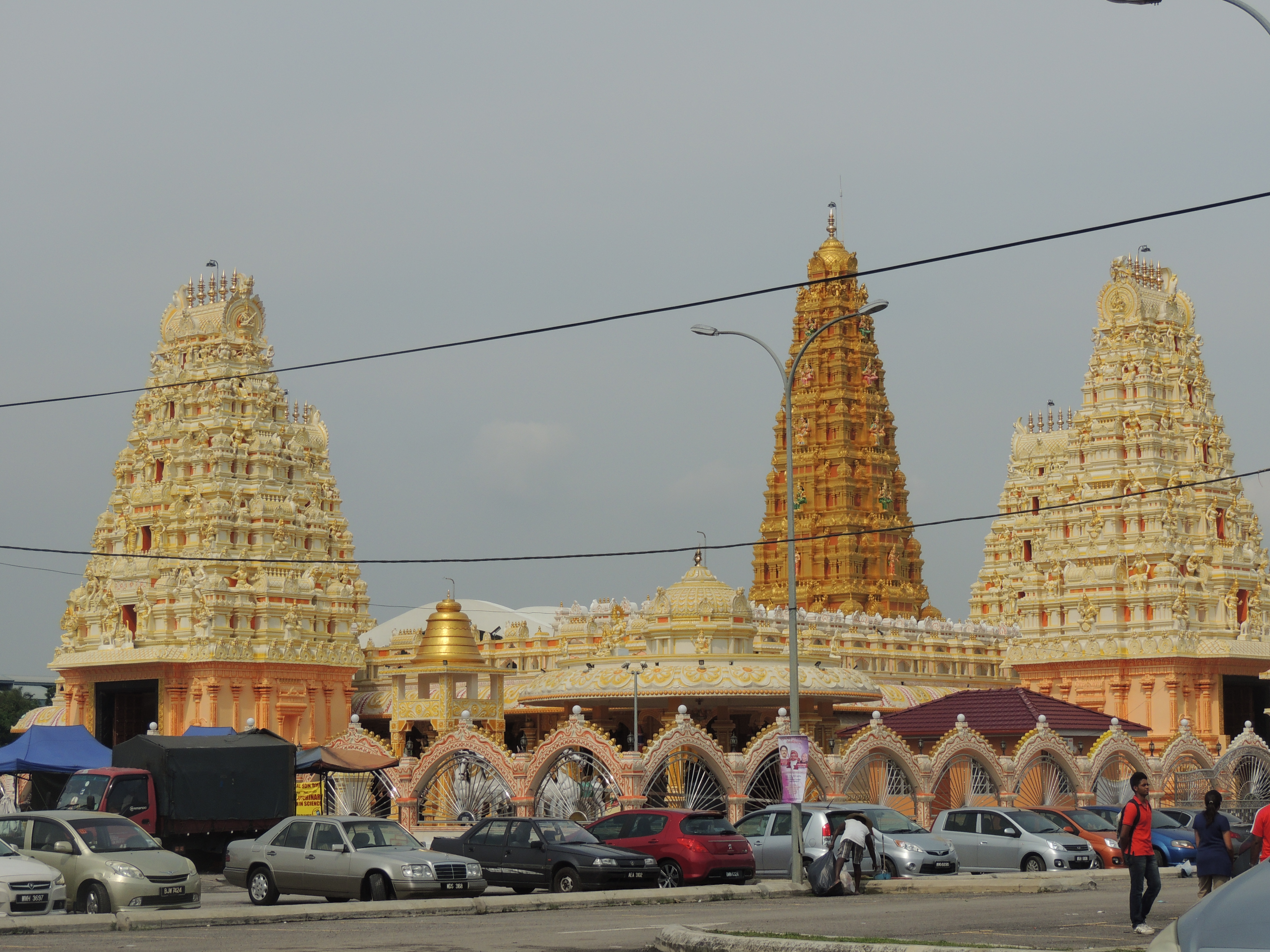

Religion
- Affiliation: Hinduism

Location
- Location: Klang
- State: Selangor
- Country: Malaysia
- Interactive map of Sri Sundararaja Perumal Temple
- Coordinates: 3.0336794°N 101.4377922°E

Sri Sundararaja Perumal Temple, better known as Klang Perumal Temple, is a Hindu temple located in Klang, Selangor in Malaysia. Built in 1892, then reconstructed in 2015, it is of the oldest, and the largest Vaishnavite temple in Malaysia, it is often referred to as the "Thirupathi of South East Asia" after its namesake in India. It is the first granite temple in Malaysia.

The temple is located in the royal town of Klang, and is just a stone's throw away from Little India in Klang.

This temple is dedicated to Vishnu in the form of Perumal (also known as Thirumaal), a very popularly worshipped form by southern Indians.

== Architecture ==
The Gopuram (entrance tower) on Persiaran Raja Muda Musa shows sculptures and carvings of deities.

At the center of the temple is the Perumal Sannathi, where representations of Perumal and his consort the Hindu goddess Mahalakshmi are situated. The center complex of contains a small gopuram with the statue of all Vishnu's avatars surrounding it.

On the right of the Perumal Sannathi is the Shivan Sannathi, representing Shiva, Parvati, Ganesha, Muruga and Ayyappan. On the left side of Perumal Sannathi is Saneshwara Sannathi, where Shani and the Navagrahas are situated.

Adjacent to the center complex is Anjaneya Sannathi and just at the corner outside the temple is Nagaraja Sannathi.

== Festivals ==
The most prominent religious activity is the Purataasi month celebration, the early autumn month dedicated to the Hindu god Perumal.
