= Pandamaran =

Human settlement in Malaysia

Coordinates: 3°00′50.0″N 101°25′01.8″E

Pandamaran in Klang District

Pandamaran is a town and a state constituency in Klang District, Selangor, Malaysia. It is adjacent to Port Klang and close to Tengku Ampuan Rahimah Hospital as well as Bandar Bukit Tinggi. Pandamaran is essentially a Chinese New Village area, it is served by excellent road connections and is one of the major industrial zones in the royal town of Klang.

== History ==
The Pandamaran New Village (Kampung Baru Pandamaran) was built in 1950 after the Malayan Emergency. The British colonial government was aiming to destroy the communist influence and thus gathered all of the Chinese residents here, where many of them came from Kuala Langat and Kuala Selangor constituencies.

Today, there's a 3-star hotel, sports complex, hockey stadium, clinics, children playgrounds, public swimming pool and a police station in Pandamaran. It falls under the jurisdiction of the Klang Royal City Council (MBDK).

== Politics ==
Pandamaran is represented in the Parliament by the Member of Parliament for Klang, Mr. Ganabatirau Veraman since 2022. In the State Assembly of Selangor, the township is represented by Mr. Tony Leong Tuck Chee since 2018, the state assemblyman for Pandamaran. The Local councillors MBDK are Mr. Jacky Ang Kian Wah and Mr. Ti Thong Siew.

== Transportation ==
=== Car ===
Pandamaran is the western end of the Shah Alam Expressway. The Klang-Banting Highway Federal Route 5 runs on the eastern boundary of Pandamaran town.

=== Public transportation ===
KTM Port Klang and KTM Jalan Kastam are the closest rail stations.

== See also ==
- Bandar Bukit Tinggi
