= Kota Bridge, Klang =

Sungai Klang Bridge Jambatan Kota, Klang
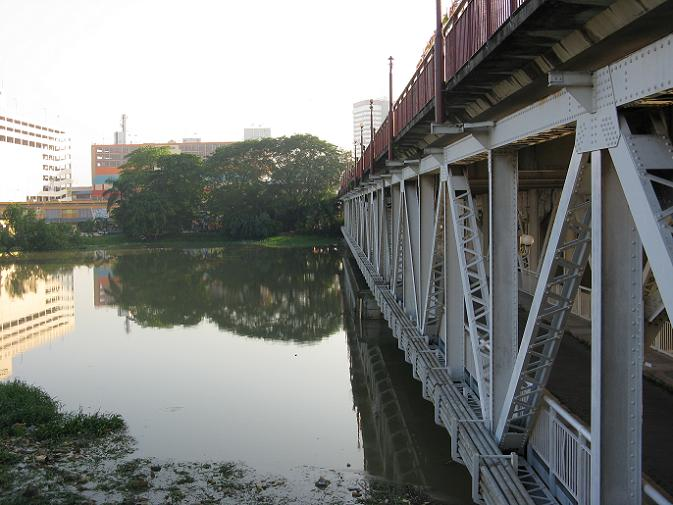
- Coordinates: 3°02′45″N 101°26′48″E
- Carries: Motor vehicles, Pedestrians
- Crosses: Klang River
- Locale: Federal Route 2 Federal Route 5 Jalan Jambatan Kota
- Official name: Kota Bridge, Klang
- Maintained by: Malaysian Public Works Department (JKR) Klang; Majlis Perbandaran Klang (MPKlang)

Characteristics
- Design: Double-decked truss girder
- Width: 22 feet (6.7 m)
- Longest span: 1,438 feet (438 m)

History
- Designer: Government of Malaysia; Malaysian Public Works Department (JKR)
- Constructed by: Malaysian Public Works Department (JKR)
- Opened: 1961

Location
- Interactive map of Sungai Klang Bridge

Kota Bridge, Klang (Malay: Jambatan Kota, Klang) is a bridge located over the Klang River in the city of Klang, Selangor. The first double-decked bridge in Malaysia, the longer upper deck was built for motorised vehicle traffic, while the shorter lower deck was used for pedestrians and bicycles only. The bridge originally had a span of 1,438 feet (438 m), but part of the bridge has been removed to allow for the construction of a new bridge alongside it. The upper deck has been converted to a public space and no longer permits automobile traffic, but the lower deck is still open to pedestrians, bicycles and motorcycles.

== History ==
A bridge, the Belfield Bridge, originally served the town of Klang, but was bombed during the Japanese invasion in the Second World War. After the war, three bridges were used temporarily to cross the river as the Belfield Bridge could not be repaired. In 1951, Crown Agents were sent from London to study the feasibility of constructing a new permanent bridge over the Klang River, from which the idea of a double-decked bridge emerged. The bridge was constructed between 1958 and 1960 and it was a reinforced steel truss girder bridge. It was constructed by Dorman Long Engineering Limited, the company that was also responsible for building the Sydney Harbour Bridge in 1932, with piling works by Gammon Messrs (Malaya) Ltd. Its cost was estimated to be £820,000 in 1956. The bridge had a total length of 1,438 feet (438 m) including approaches with a central span of 282 feet (86 m). The bridge was first launched in 1959 by the late Sultan of Selangor, Sultan Hisamuddin Alam Shah. It was originally intended to be named Alam Shah Bridge after the sultan, but Sultan Hisamuddin decided two weeks before opening that it should be called Kota Bridge ("kota" means "city") after the Bukit Kota Palace.

The bridge was completed in 1960 and officially opened in 1961 by Almarhum Sultan Salahuddin Abdul Aziz Shah in conjunction with his coronation as the ninth Sultan of Selangor. Due to increasing traffic, two new bridges were built, the first one built near the Kota Bridge. In the 1990s, due to the high capacity traffic with the upgrading of the Federal Highway Route (Klang - Kuala Lumpur) into six lane carriageway toll highway, a further bridge was constructed directly next to Kota Bridge from 1991 to 1993. The double-decked bridge was closed to traffic and the new concrete bridge with six lane carriageway was built beside the original double-decked bridge. The north end of the Kota Bridge was removed to allow the new bridge to be built, but about 300m of the bridge remained.

== Usage ==
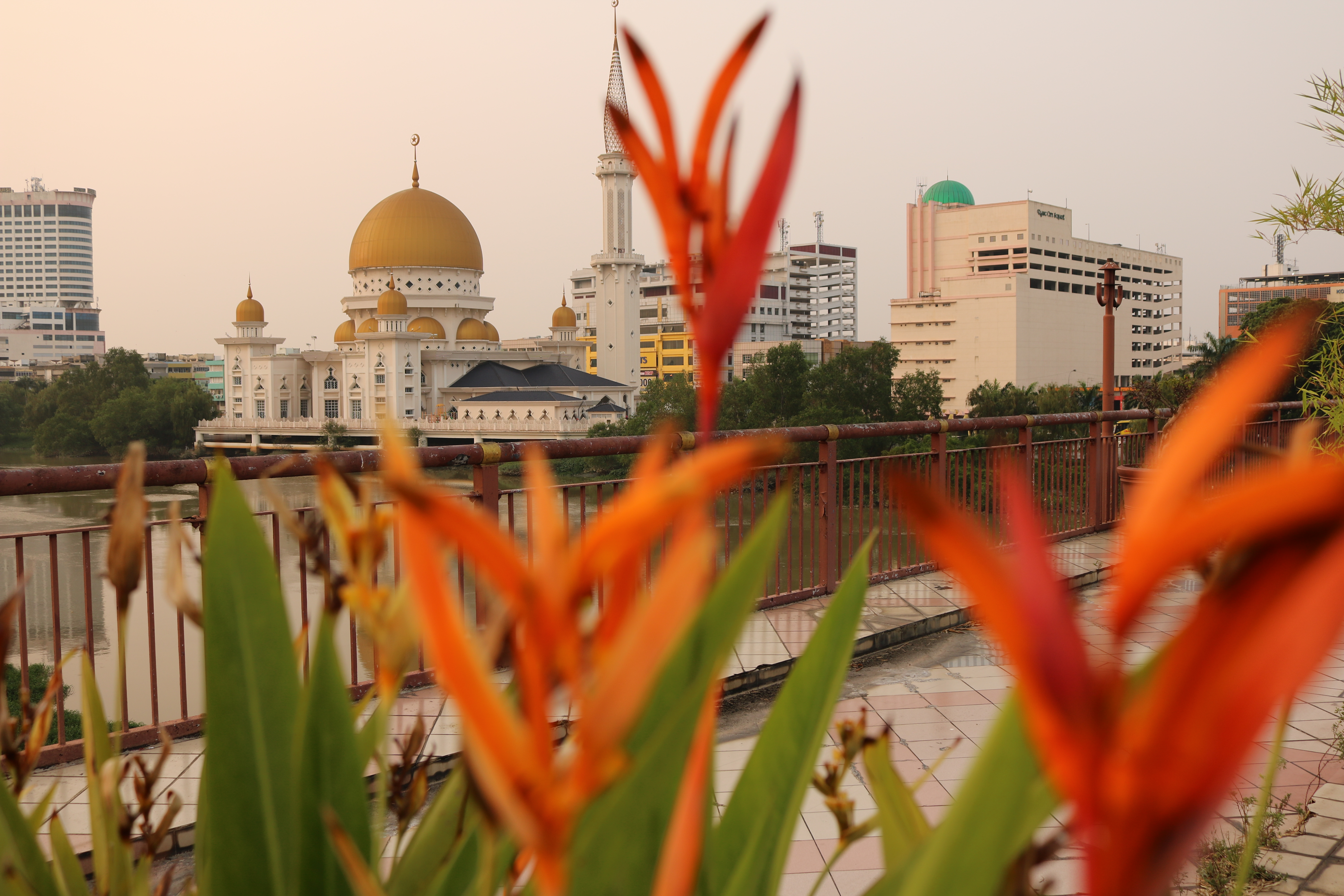
View from upper deck of bridge, now serving as a public space

The bottom deck is a pedestrian walkway bridge while the top deck was originally used as a motor vehicle bridge. The top deck has been closed to traffic when a new bridge was built alongside it, while the bottom deck continues to be used as a bridge for pedestrians, bicycles and motorcycles. In the 1990s, the top deck of bridge was renovated into public space called Dataran Jambatan Kota (Kota Bridge Square).

The bridge has been used a film location for the Malaysian production Sangkar as well as for commercials. An attempt to have the bridge gazetted as a national heritage site was launched in 2019.

== See also ==
- Federal Route 2
