= Hin Hua High School =

School in Klang, Selangor, Malaysia

Hin Hua High School 巴生兴华中学 Sekolah Menengah Hin Hua

Location
- Klang, Selangor; Malaysia; 3.033403°N 101.439468°E

Information
- Type: Chinese independent high school
- Motto: 礼义廉耻
- Established: 15 June 1947
- Status: Open
- School district: Klang
- Chairman: Choo Yan Tiee
- Principal: Soh Chin Choon (苏进存)
- Website: www.hinhua.edu.my

Hin Hua High School
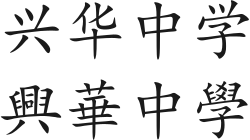
- Hin Hua High School in Simplified Chinese (top) and Traditional Chinese character (below)
- Traditional Chinese: 興華中學
- Simplified Chinese: 兴华中学
Transcriptions
Standard Mandarin
- Hanyu Pinyin: Xīnghuá Zhōngxué

Centre park of Hin Hua

Basketball court of Hin Hua

Hin Hua High School (Chinese: 兴华中学; Malay: Sekolah Menengah Hin Hua) is a Chinese independent high school in Klang, Selangor, Malaysia. One of the four Chinese independent schools in Selangor, it was founded in 1947 by the joint efforts of parents, teachers and fellow students. Now, It is one of the most popular high schools in the state, accepting 600-700 students per year The institution has undergone multiple restructuring and reformation activities since 1969.

== See also ==
- List of schools in Selangor
