= Bandar Botanic =

Township in Malaysia

Coordinates: 2°59′19.6″N 101°26′51.1″E

Botanic Klang is a major township in the southern part of Klang, Selangor, Malaysia. The RM3 billion township project is led by Gamuda Berhad and developed by Harum Intisari Sdn Bhd. It is adjacent to other new and modern townships such as Glenmarie Cove and Bukit Tinggi, Klang.

The township consists of 2 development parcels, Parcel A and Parcel B. Parcel A was developed mainly for double storey link houses, semi-detached houses, commercial shop offices and apartments. Parcel B is mainly focused on bigger sized houses: double storey super link houses, semi-detached houses, and bungalows. Botanic Capital is a massive 67-acre (270,000 m^{2}) freehold central business district in Botanic Klang.

The 1,247-acre (5.05 km^{2}) freehold township became one of the most sought developments in the Klang Valley when it was launched in July 2001. Botanic Klang is the first waterfront parkland township with a self-sustaining urban stormwater management system in Malaysia, and the country's first winner of the coveted FIABCI Property Award 2003 for Best Master Plan.

Botanic Klang falls under the jurisdiction of the Klang Royal City Council (MBDK). It is represented in the Parliament by the Member of Parliament for Klang, Mr. Ganabatirau Veraman. There are many public amenities in and around Bandar Botanic such as banks, post offices, shopping centres (AEON Bukit Tinggi Shopping Centre, Lotus's and Giant Hypermarket).
