= Tengku Ampuan Rahimah Hospital =

Coordinates: 3°1′15″N 101°26′21″E

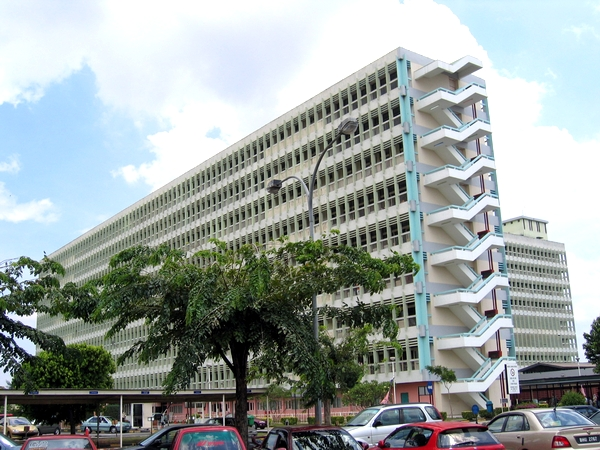
- Main block of the Tengku Ampuan Rahimah (TAR) General Hospital in Klang

Geography
- Location: Jalan Langat, Klang, Selangor, Malaysia

Organisation
- Care system: Public
- Type: General
- Affiliated university: University of Malaya; Management and Science University

Services
- Emergency department: Yes
- Beds: 1094

Helipads
- Helipad: Yes

History
- Founded: 1985

Links
- Website: htar.jknselangor.moh.gov.my
- Lists: Hospitals in Malaysia

The Tengku Ampuan Rahimah (TAR) Hospital in Klang (Malay: Hospital Besar Tengku Ampuan Rahimah, Klang), also known as Klang General Hospital or Klang GH, is a 1094-bed government tertiary hospital located in the south of the royal town of Klang, Selangor, Malaysia. The hospital is the second busiest hospital in Malaysia in terms of inpatients admission and the busiest outpatient medical facility in Malaysia.

This hospital provides primary and selected tertiary care services. The hospital began operations in 1985 and is located not far from Istana Alam Shah and Bandar Bukit Tinggi. It was named after the consort of Sultan Salahuddin, Tengku Ampuan Rahimah.

== Hospital Information ==
The Tengku Ampuan Rahimah (TAR) General Hospital is a 28-ward Malaysian government medical facility with over 850 inpatients beds and 20 clinical disciplines. It has a monthly average of 10,000 patients and a daily average of 20 elective surgeries.

The Klang TAR Hospital is also a referral hospital for many district hospitals and health clinics ranging from Kuala Langat in the south up to Kuala Selangor in the north. It was awarded the MS ISO 9002 Quality System certification in 1998.

This hospital also focuses on ambulatory services and is equipped with a helipad for emergency evacuation purposes. The Klang TAR Hospital also houses an in-situ medical teaching facility for the medical students of University of Malaya and Management and Science University.

In 2014, the hospital recorded 95,000 inpatients, the second highest in the country after Kuala Lumpur Hospital. The hospital serves a population catchment of 1.2 million.

The hospital has 4,025 staff in 2016.

== Gallery ==
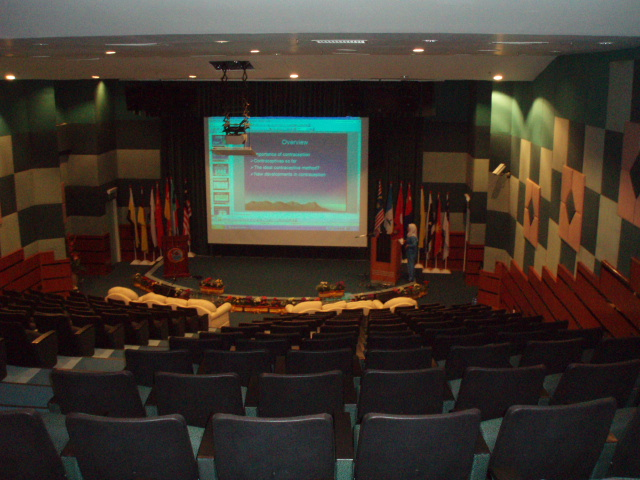
Hospital auditorium

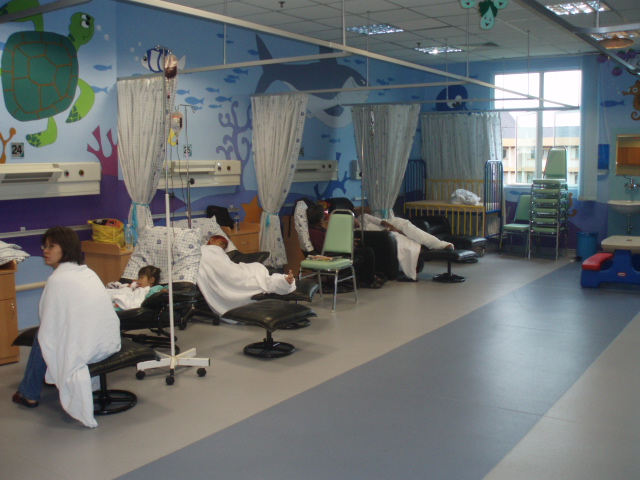
Day Care Centre

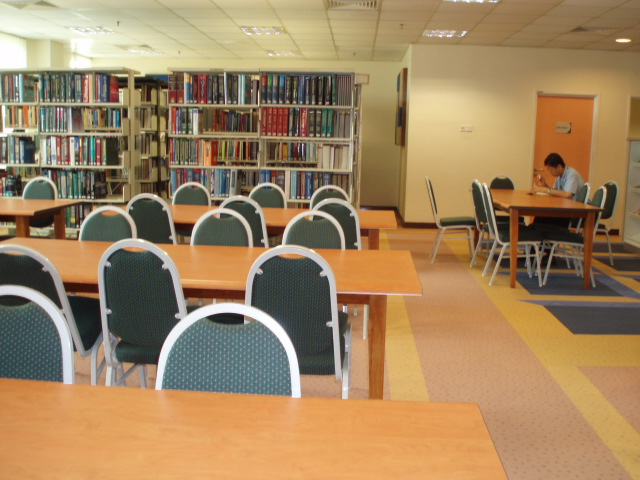
Hospital library

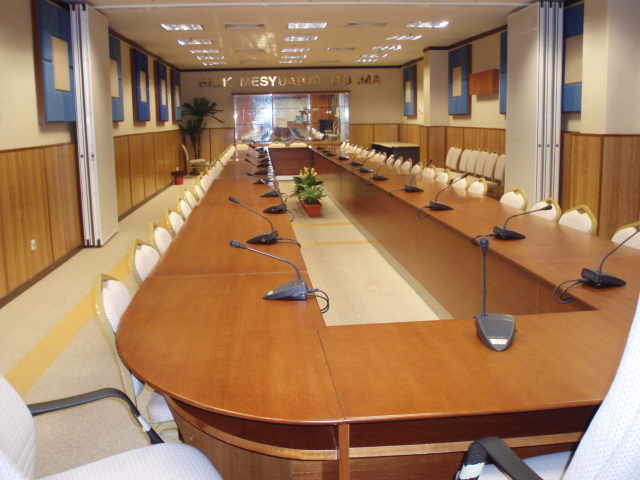
Board meeting room

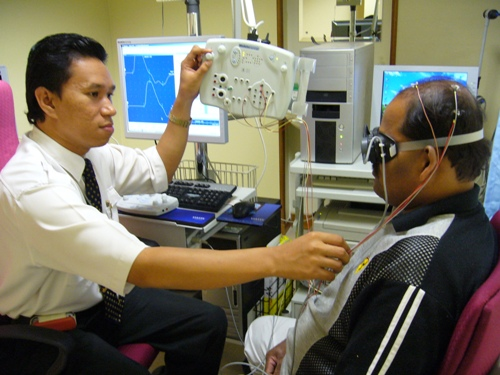
Doctor attending to the patient at the Neurology Dept.

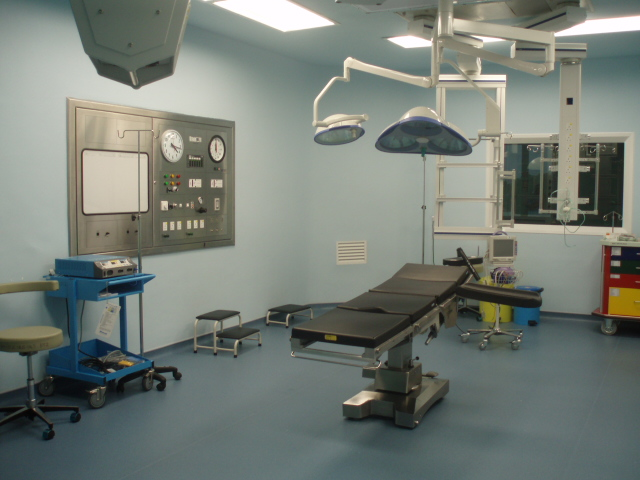
Operation theatre

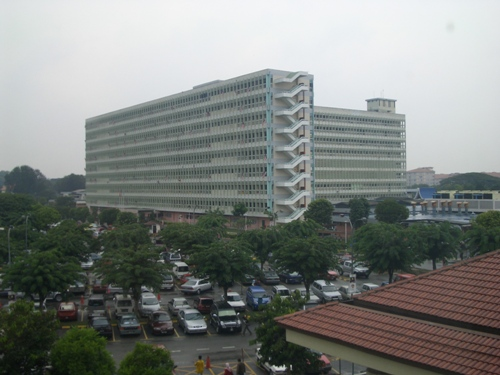
Hospital main block

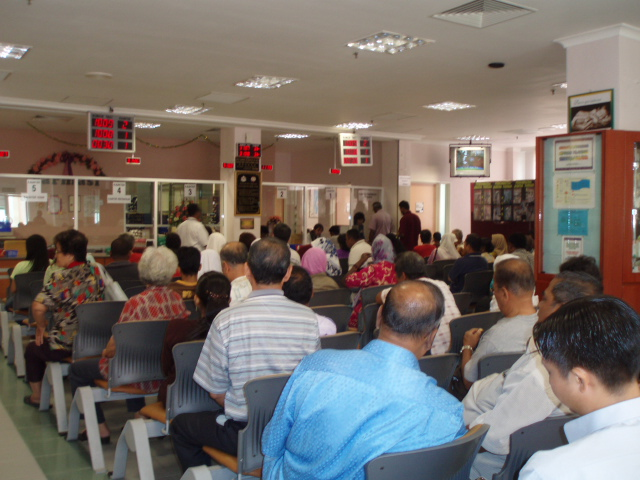
Pharmacy Department

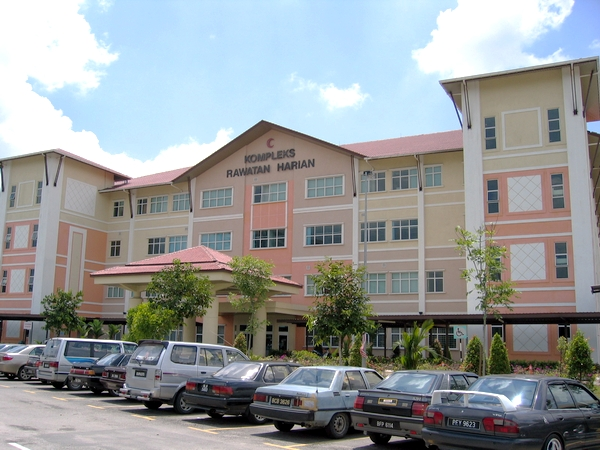
New block of the Day Care Centre

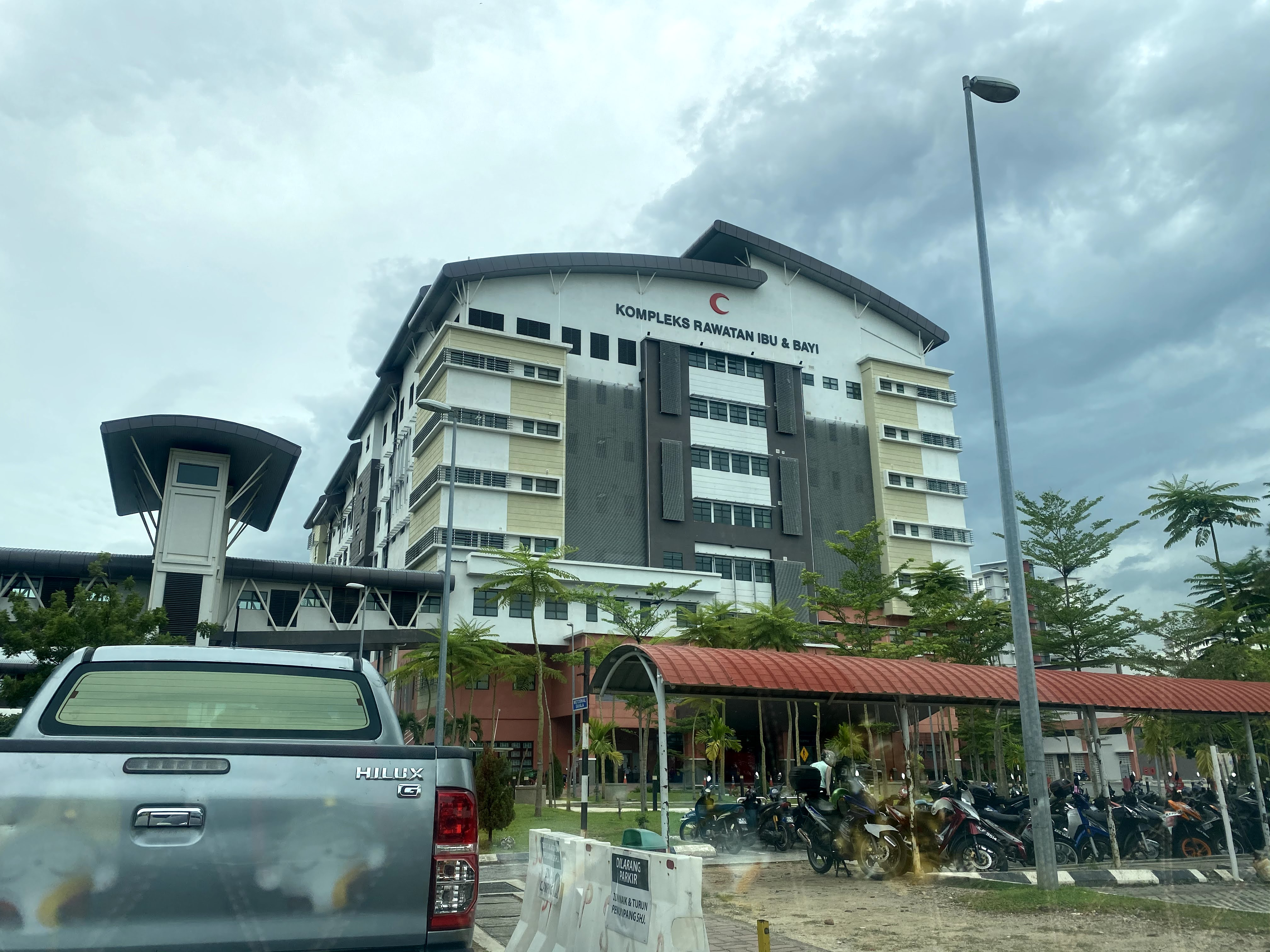
New block of Mother and Child Care Complex (KRIBA) which started operations in March 2019.

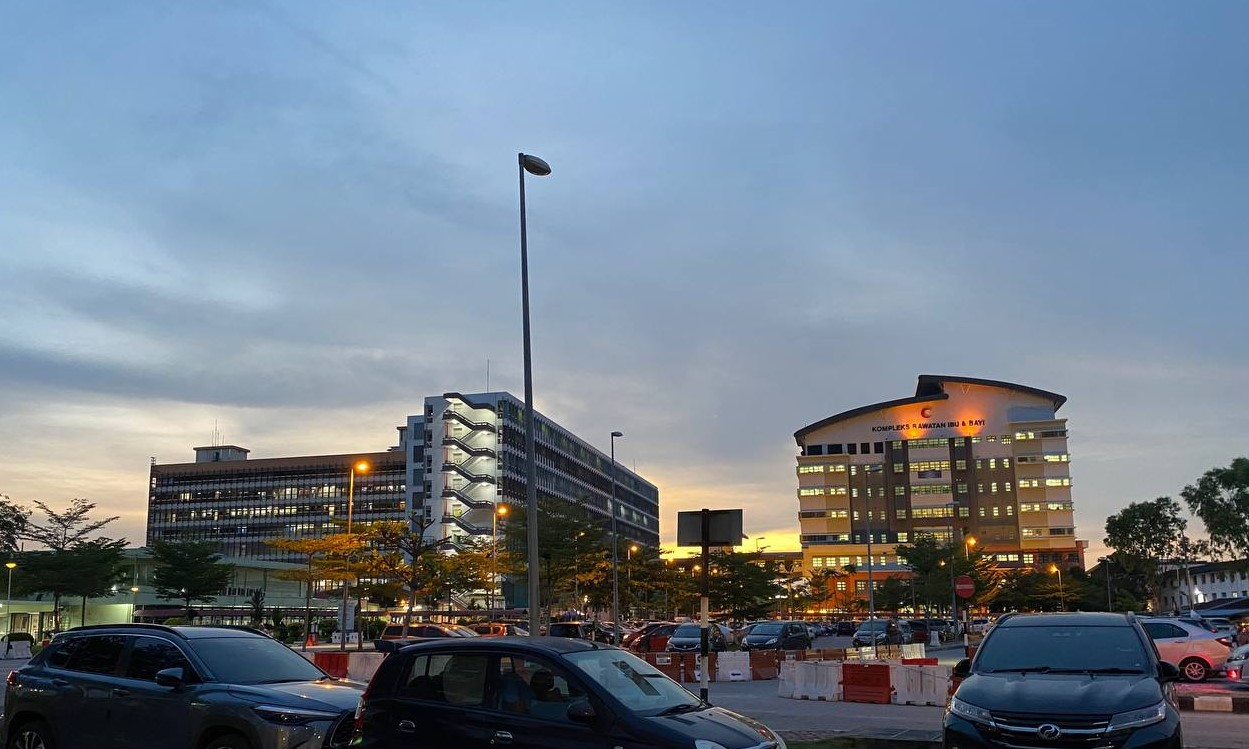
The hospital at dusk. Seen here on the left is the main block, while the KRIBA is on the right.

== Issues ==
=== Overcrowded ===
The hospital is currently facing overcrowding issues, with too many patients and lack of space. Patients are being treated on beds placed along the corridors. TAR has 893 beds, with an admission rate of 260 patients daily. In 2014, the hospital recorded 95,000 inpatients, the second highest in the country.

=== Flash flood ===
A section of geriatric ward of the hospital is frequently flooded during heavy downpour. The hospital management has proposed to build a retention pond to overcome the issue to the State Public Works Department, Drainage and Irrigation Department and Health Department in February 2015.
