= Bandar Bukit Tinggi =

Integrated township in Klang, Selangor, Malaysia

- Township
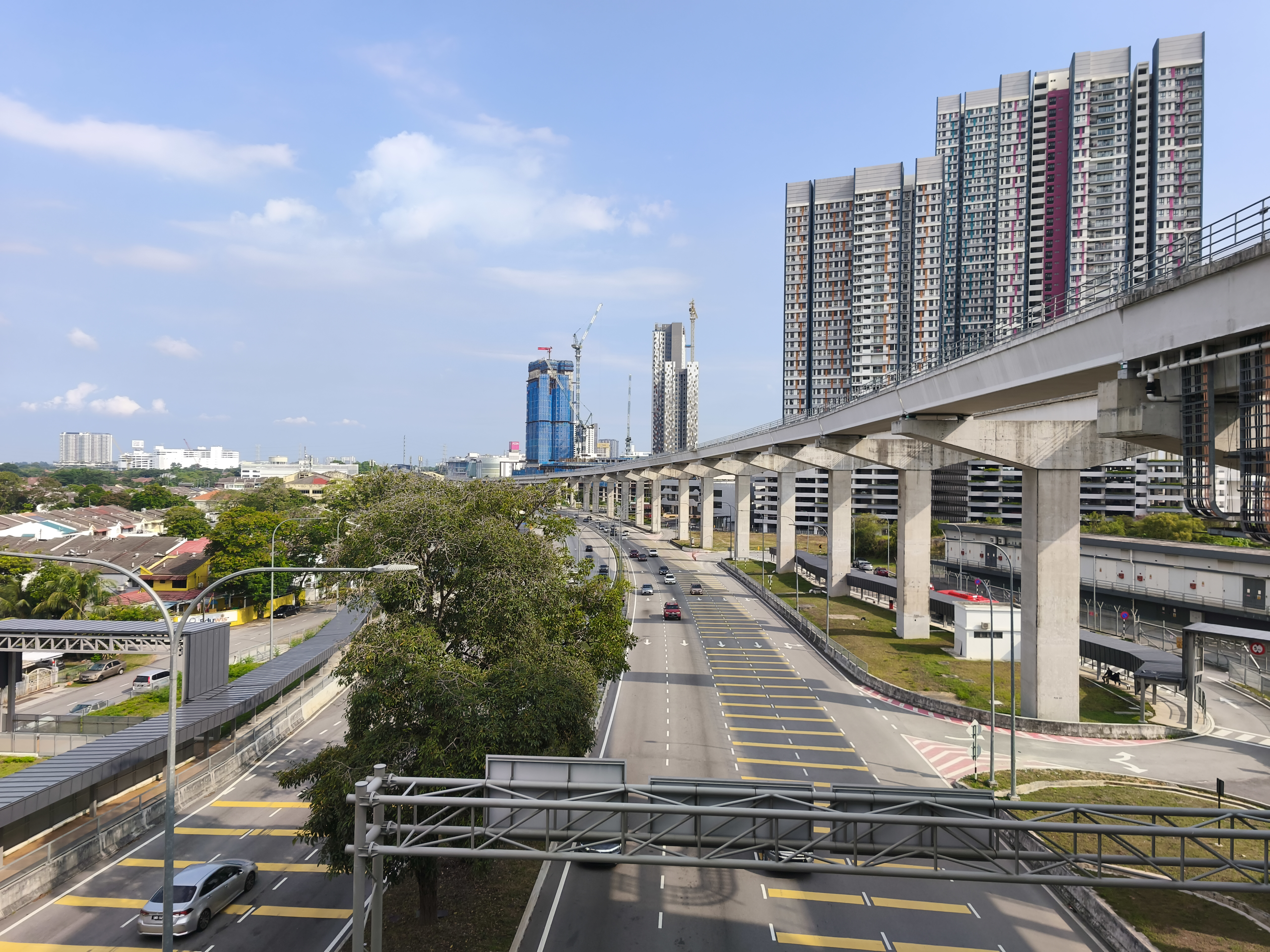
- The Bandar Bukit Tinggi skyline viewed from Klang Jaya LRT station
- Interactive map of Bandar Bukit Tinggi
- Coordinates: 3.0022°N 101.4345°E
- Country: Malaysia
- State: Selangor
- District: Klang District
- Local government: Klang Royal City Council (MBDK)
- Groundbreaking: 1997
- Founder: WCT Holdings Berhad

Area
  - Total: 5.45 km^{2} (2.10 sq mi)

Population
  - Total: 90,000
- Postal code: 41200
- Phone prefix: +60-3

Bandar Bukit Tinggi is an integrated and modern commercial and residential township located in Klang, Selangor, Malaysia. Developed since 1997 by WCT Holdings Berhad, this self-sufficient mature township represents a RM5 billion (over US$1.6 billion) investment, boasting an extensive array of residential options, infrastructure, and public amenities.

Spanning over 1,346 acres (5.45 km²) of freehold land, Bandar Bukit Tinggi features a mixed development comprising more than 20,000 property units. This inventory includes double-storey terraced houses, semi-detached properties, bungalows, and various high-density luxury and medium-cost apartments. The township is structurally demarcated into three primary development phases: Bukit Tinggi 1 (BT1), Bukit Tinggi 2 (BT2), and Bukit Tinggi 3 (officially known as Klang Parklands). It is adjacent to other major modern master-planned developments, namely Bandar Botanic, Glenmarie Cove, Bandar Puteri Klang, Kota Bayuemas, and Bandar Bestari (Canary Garden).

== Retail and commercial ==
Bandar Bukit Tinggi serves as a prominent commercial hub in southern Klang, housing hundreds of retail and food outlets. Dining alternatives range from traditional open-air mamak stalls, kopitiams, and local specialties like bak kut teh, to specialized seafood, satay, vegetarian, and international Western or Asian restaurants.

The township accommodates two major hypermarkets, Lotus's and Giant Hypermarket, alongside the Première Hotel, a 300-room modern business hotel. A broad matrix of ancillary services supports the population of more than 90,000 residents, including retail banking hubs, corporate offices, medical clinics, fitness centres, local parks, and primary and secondary schools.

The central civic landmark of the township is the AEON Bukit Tinggi Shopping Centre, one of the largest standalone AEON complexes in Southeast Asia. The mall features a gross lettable area of approximately one million square feet and more than 5,000 parking spaces.

Directly adjacent to the mall is The Landmark, an integrated commercial project comprising 20 blocks of retail units and two 9-storey corporate office blocks with a gross development value of RM180 million. The commercial sector also incorporates the Impiria Residences high-rise serviced suites and a 98-room boutique lodging establishment named The Canvas Hotel, all of which are linked directly to the AEON shopping centre via elevated pedestrian skybridges.

== Governance ==
Bandar Bukit Tinggi is administratively governed by the Klang Royal City Council (MBDK).

In federal politics, the township is situated within the Kota Raja (P111) parliamentary constituency, represented by Mohamad Sabu of the National Trust Party (AMANAH), who also serves as the party's federal president. At the state legislative level, the area falls under the Sentosa (N48) state constituency, represented by Gunarajah George of the People's Justice Party (PKR). Local community interests and municipal welfare matters are facilitated by the Residents' Association of Bukit Tinggi (PPBT).

== Transportation ==
Bandar Bukit Tinggi is situated approximately 50 km west of Kuala Lumpur and 30 km from Petaling Jaya. The township is linked directly to Malaysia's expressway grid via the Shah Alam Expressway (KESAS). The ongoing construction of the West Coast Expressway (WCE) will further interface with the municipal boundaries upon its full commissioning. For public bus transport, the township maintains scheduled direct routes connecting residents to the Klang city centre, Kuala Lumpur Sentral, Banting, and Kuala Lumpur International Airport (KLIA) via Aerobus.

The area is also integrated into the Klang Valley rail transit network following the official commencement of the RM9 billion LRT Shah Alam Line in mid-2026. The township is serviced by two dedicated elevated rail stations: Klang Jaya LRT station (serving the northern periphery and BT1) and Bandar Bukit Tinggi LRT station (serving the commercial precinct and BT2). This rapid transit inclusion effectively reduces commuting times across the Klang Valley conurbation.

== See also ==
- Klang District
- AEON Bukit Tinggi Shopping Centre
