= Fajar Secondary School =

Coordinates: 1.3691°N 103.7702°E

Fajar Secondary School Sekolah Menengah Fajar 励进中学

Location
- 31 Gangsa Road, Singapore 678972

Information
- Type: Government, Co-educational, Single-Session
- Opened: January 1994; 32 years ago
- Closed: 2023
- Principal: Doris Ho Sook Fun
- Color: Orange Navy Blue
- Website: fajarsec.moe.edu.sg

Fajar Secondary School (FJS) was a co-educational government secondary school in Bukit Panjang, Singapore. Founded in 1994, it merged with Chestnut Drive Secondary School in 2015 and merged again with Greenridge Secondary School in 2023.

== History ==
In January 1994, with an enrolment of 307 students and a teaching strength of 17 teachers, Fajar Secondary School started functioning at the premises of Greenridge Secondary School with Law Ngee Seng as its first principal. It shifted to its current premises at 31 Gangsa Road in 1996. The campus was officially opened on 11 July 1998 with Saminathan Gopal as the school's second principal. Goh Mee Mee became the third principal and served from 2001 to 2007. Ng Shok Yan was the fourth principal, serving from 2008 to 2013, while Sng Siew Hong served as the fifth principal from January 2014 to December 2015 before Chestnut Drive Secondary School was merged into Fajar Secondary School.

On 7 April 2022, Ministry of Education announced that Fajar Secondary School will be merging with Greenridge Secondary School in January 2023. The merged school will be called Greenridge Secondary School and will occupy Fajar Secondary School’s campus.
