= Bukit Panjang Public Library =

Public library in Singapore

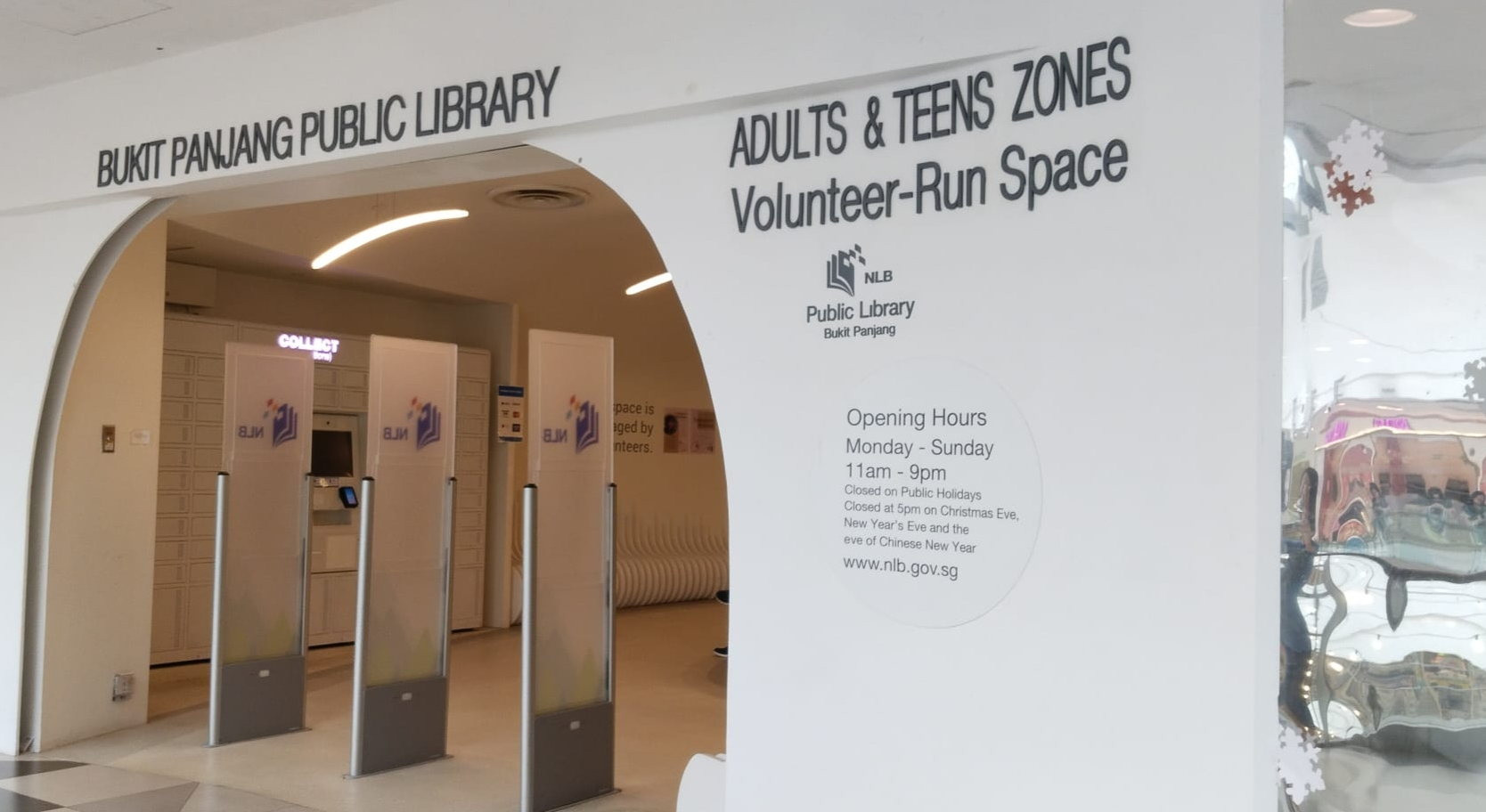
- Entrance to the Adult and Teens Zone
- 1.3801°N 103.7644°E
- Location: Singapore
- Type: Public library
- Established: 4 April 1998; 28 years ago
- Branch of: National Library Board

Access and use
- Population served: 139,000

Other information
- Public transit access: BP6 – DT1 Bukit Panjang
- Website: Official website

Bukit Panjang Public Library is a public library in Bukit Panjang, Singapore. It is located inside Bukit Panjang Plaza and the nearest station to it is Bukit Panjang MRT/LRT station. It is also near the Bukit Panjang Bus Interchange. It is the fourth public library owned by the National Library Board to be located inside a mall.

== History ==
The library was called Bukit Panjang Community Library before 2009. Its name was changed to Bukit Panjang Public Library on 2010. It was officially opened on 4 April 1998 by Dr Teo Ho Pin, who was the then-Member of Parliament (MP) for Sembawang GRC (Bukit Panjang Division).

=== Renovation ===
On 4 September 2016, the library underwent a 10-month renovation, opening on 1 July 2017. It now has 2 wings that are facing each other on the 4th floor. The Adults' and Teens' Zone are in the old library space while the Children's Zone is in the space previously occupied by Daiso. The library was officially reopened by Minister for Communications and Information Dr Yaacob Ibrahim.

There are also colour-coded strips to guide people at the library.

== Layout ==
The library consists of two separate zones, an Adult and Teen zone, and a Children's zone.

=== Adults' and Teens' Zones ===
- AV
- Magazines
- Newspapers
- Fiction
- Non fiction
- Chinese books
- Malay books
- Tamil books
- Teens

=== Children's Zone ===
- Family & parenting
- Books for babies
- Picture books
- Novels
- AV
- Magazines
- Singapore
- Chinese books
- Malay books
- Tamil books

== See also ==
- National Library Board
- Libraries in Singapore
