= Pang Sua Pond =

Wetland in Bukit Panjang, Singapore

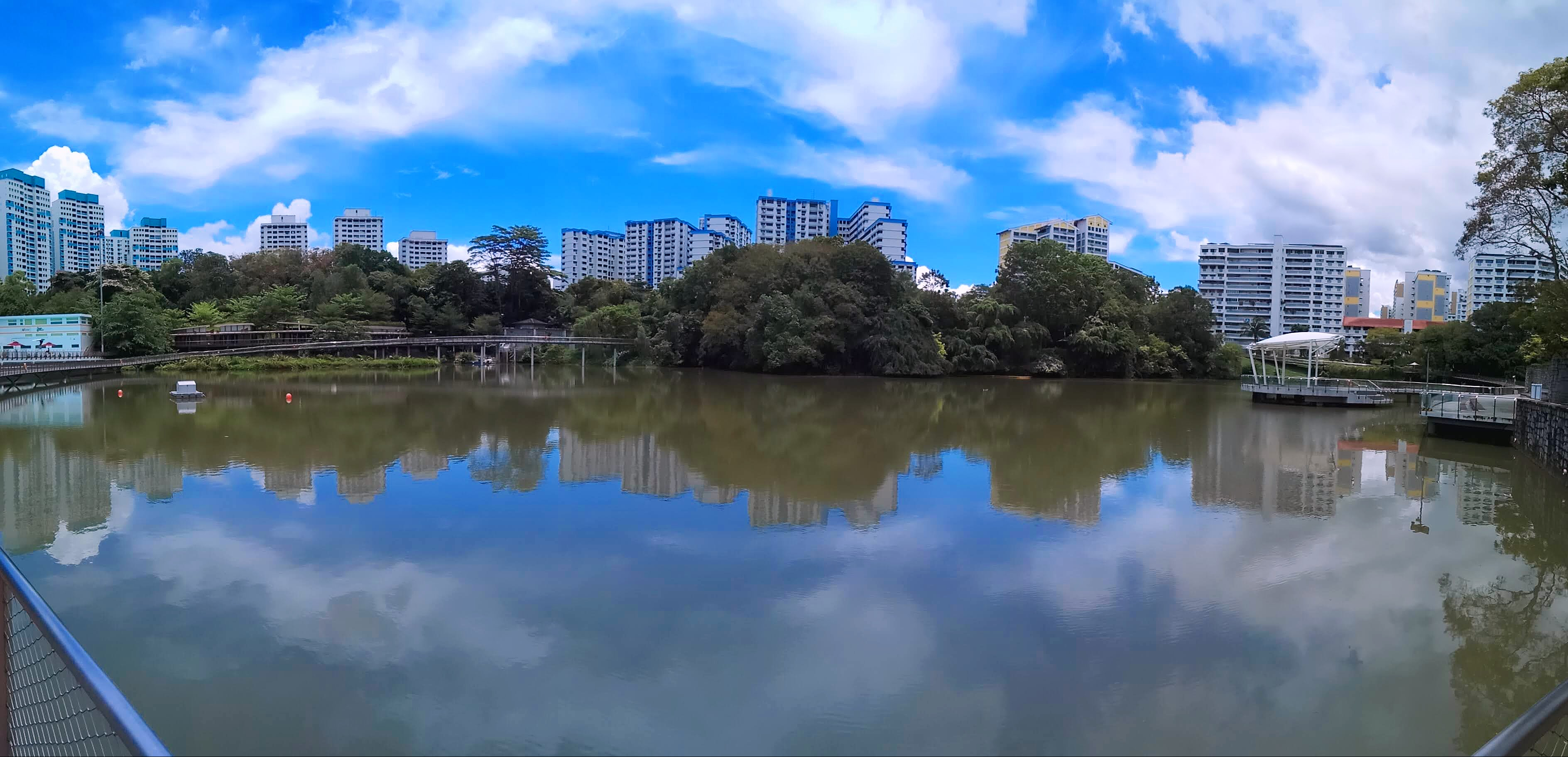
- Interactive map of Pang Sua Pond
- Type: Man-made floating wetland
- Location: Bukit Panjang, Singapore
- Coordinates: 1.3819°N 103.7655°E
- Public transit: BP13 Senja

Pang Sua Pond is a floating wetland located in Bukit Panjang, Singapore. It is the second-largest man-made wetland in Singapore. The pond has a 480-meter long elevated bridge that connects to the Bukit Panjang Park Connector and the Senja-Cashew Community Club. It also serves as a stormwater collection pond.

== Etymology ==
Pang Sua Pond's English name may be a transliteration of the Hokkien word 捧沙 (Pe̍h-ōe-jī: phâng-soa; lit. 'hold up sand in two hands').

== Description ==
The boardwalk is 480-meters long and 7-meters high that can be used for jogging or walking. There is also a stage for performances and community events along with viewing spots.

== History ==
Pang Sua Pond was one of 16 stormwater collection ponds built in the 1990s to help combat the possibility of flooding during a heavy downpour by collecting surface runoff. The water collected in Pang Sua Pond would then be pumped to the Upper Seletar Reservoir for treatment.

In 2014, the pond underwent a 30-month treatment under the Public Utilities Board's Active, Beautiful, Clean Waters (ABC Waters) scheme.

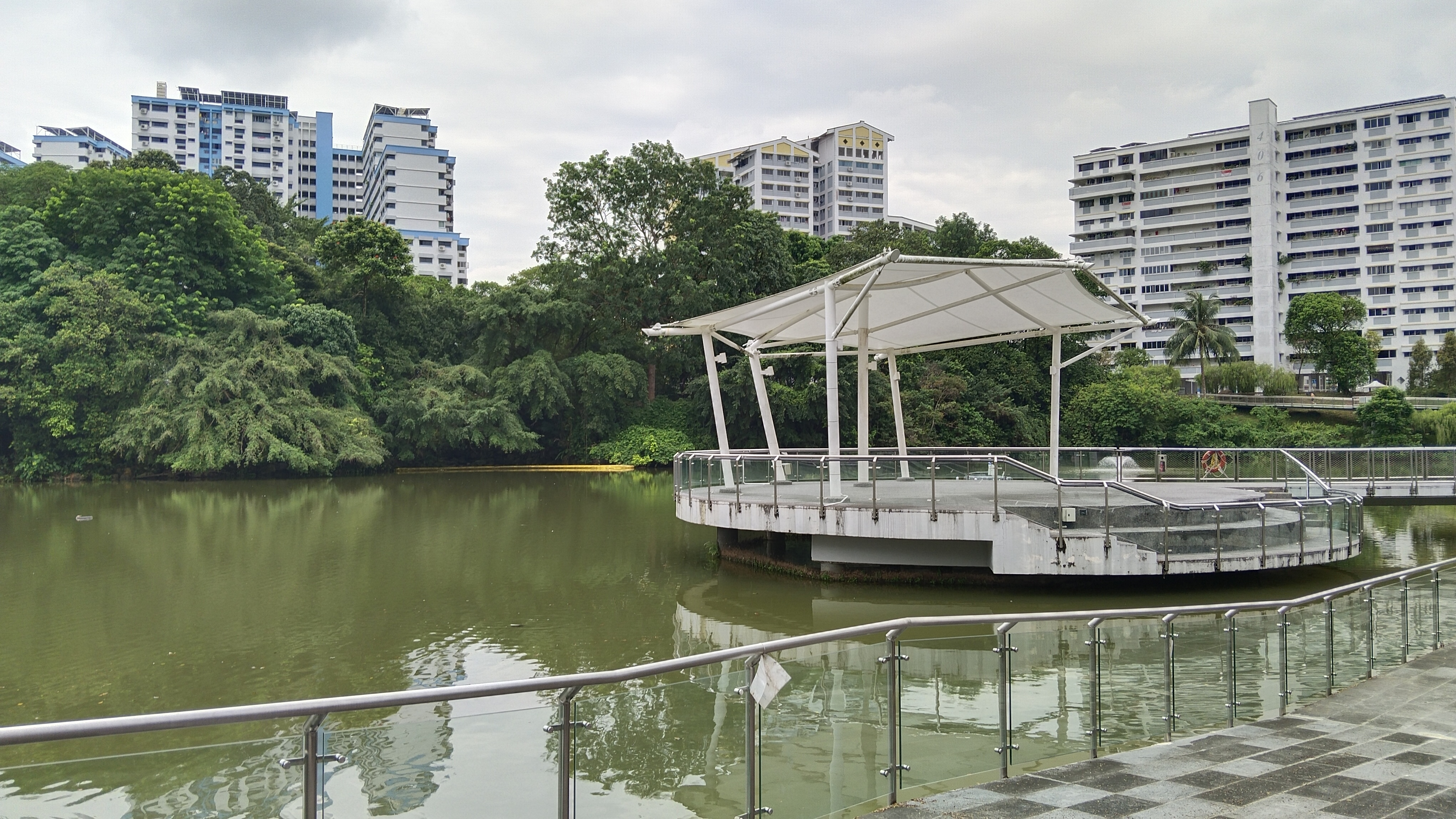
Pang Sua Pond with the Performance Stage in the middle.

The renovation was completed on 25 March 2017 and was opened by Prime Minister Lee Hsien Loong. It was also announced that six schools around the area have also pledged to maintaining the pond, the schools are Teck Whye Primary School, Zhenghua Primary School, Greenridge Primary School, West Spring Primary School, West View Primary School, and Zhenghua Secondary School.

The finished pond features more wetland plants such as the leather fern, water canna, and the miniature flatsedge. It also features fish, dragonflies, terrapins, and birds. A 480-meter long bridge elevated 7-meters of the water was also added.

In 2021, Pang Sua Pond had lights added to its boardwalk in celebration of National Day.

== Incident ==
On 9 September 2020, a 65-year-old man was found dead in the Pond after the SCDF received a call at around 5 am for help. Divers from DART were deployed to do an underwater search where they retrieved a body around 30m from the shore. The man was pronounced dead at scene.

== See also ==
- List of parks in Singapore
