= Greenridge Secondary School =

- 励进中学; Sekolah Menengah Greenridge

Location
- 31 Gangsa Road, Singapore 678972; Singapore; 1.3752°N 103.7642°E

Information
- Type: Government; Co-educational
- Motto: Together Onward
- Established: 1962; 64 years ago (original); 2023; 3 years ago (post-merger)
- Session: Single
- Principal: Ng Boon Kiat
- Colour: Blue Orange White
- Website: greenridgesec.moe.edu.sg

Greenridge Secondary School (GSS) is a co-educational government secondary school located in Bukit Panjang, Singapore. Established in 1962, the school was merged with and Fajar Secondary School (FJS) in 2023, re-establishing itself in the latter's campus in the process.

== History ==
=== Greenridge Secondary School (1964–2022) ===
GSS was established in 1964 as Dunearn Secondary Technical School (DSTS) at Hillcrest Road with an enrolment of 900. On 14 May 1965, it was officially opened by Deputy Prime Minister Toh Chin Chye.

As part of the relocation plans, DSTS moved out of Hillcrest Road Estate and was renamed Greenridge Secondary School. It relocated again to the edge of Bukit Panjang New Town in 1992 and two years later, on 16 July 1994, Lee Yiok Seng, Member of Parliament for Sembawang GRC, declared the school open. The school is one of the pioneer secondary schools in Holland–Bukit Panjang GRC and has hosted two other schools, Fajar Secondary School and Zhenghua Secondary School.

A new era on innovation and enterprise began in 2003 whereby science, design and information technology are combined to make pupils aware of the interconnectedness of subjects in an attempt to stimulate their interest in their studies and the ability to think out of the box. In 2006, GSS students represented the West Zone cluster for the National WITs Convention.

=== Fajar Secondary School (2016–2022) ===
==== Fajar Secondary School (1994–2015) ====
In January 1994, with an enrolment of 307 students and a teaching strength of 17 teachers, Fajar Secondary School (FSS) started functioning at the premises of Greenridge Secondary School with Law Ngee Seng as its first principal. It shifted to its current premises at 31 Gangsa Road in 1996. The campus was officially opened on 11 July 1998 with Saminathan Gopal as the school's second principal. Goh Mee Mee became the third principal and served from 2001 to 2007. Ng Shok Yan was the fourth principal, serving from 2008 to 2013, while Sng Siew Hong served as the fifth and last principal from January 2014 to December 2015.

In creating a platform for the student population to reminisce and appreciate the school at its original site prior to the holding site at 58 Chestnut Drive, a commemoration event known as the “Nostalgic Moments” was held on 23 October 2015 for the Secondary 1 to 3 students and staff.

==== Chestnut Drive Secondary School (1968–2015) ====
Chestnut Drive Secondary School (CDSS) received their first cohort of students on 4 January 1968 and started as a Chinese Integrated School with an enrolment figure of 787 at 58 Chestnut Drive. The school was officially opened by then Member of Parliament, Mr P. Selvadurai on 12 June 1969. The school conducted classes for both the English and Chinese streams in her early years until 1988 when the Chinese Stream was phased out due to the implementation of the national curriculum.

The School Advisory Committee and Pupil Welfare Fund were set up in the 1970s during the tenure of the first principal, Mdm Lo Pui Yu. The school song was composed in 1976 by the third Principal, Mr Lee Thiam Lock.

Under the stewardship of the seventh Principal, Ms Chan Mee Leen, the school underwent a phased reconstruction which was completed in 2005. On 9 July 2005, the new campus was declared officially opened by Dr Teo Ho Pin, Mayor of North-West District and Member of Parliament for Holland-Bukit Panjang GRC. In 2011, the school celebrated its 45th anniversary with an original musical. On 15 December 2012, Mdm Tan Miao Ling was appointed the ninth Principal of CDSS, taking the mantle from Mr Teoh Teik Hoe.

In late 2014, the school started preparations for merger with FSS. On 21 November 2015, the school finally closed her doors with a fitting function “Celebrations 2015”where CDSS ex-School Leaders, Pioneer Teachers, Senior Educators, ex-staff and ex-students attended. The function was graced by Ms Sim Ann, Senior Minister of State, Ministry of Culture, Community and Youth & Ministry of Finance and MP for Holland-Bukit Timah GRC.

==== Post-merger (2016–2022) ====
Fajar Secondary School (FJS) officially started operations as a merged school on 4 January 2016. The school adopted Chestnut Drive’s Chinese name (励进中学) and used Fajar Secondary School as its English name. The school initially functioned at 58 Chestnut Drive while their campus at 31 Gangsa Road was being upgraded. FJS moved to their main campus at Gangsa Road in 2018.

=== Greenridge Secondary School (2023–present) ===
On 8 April 2021, the Ministry of Education announced the merger of the first GSS and FJS due to falling student enrolment. The school was allocated to FJS' campus at 31 Gangsa Road to carry out its operations. The merged school is known as Greenridge Secondary School (GSS) and has adopted FJS’s Chinese name (励进中学).

GSS welcomed its pioneer batch of 1300 students on 3 January 2023. The students hailed from the old Greenridge Secondary and Fajar Secondary Schools. As part of GSS' plan to enhance the former FJS campus at 31 Gangsa Road, the building was repainted, and several trees inside the campus were removed. GSS' school year of 2023 ended with an event known as 'GSS Summit'. GSS had an Open House event on 18 November.

At the start of 2025, Greenridge officially began referring itself as "The Champions Academy". They changed the name of the Parade Square to "The Plaza", and changed the name of the Canteen to "The Champions Lounge". They also stopped using numerical names for their form classes, using Agatha, Beethoven, Confucius, Galileo, Leonardo, Nightingale, Teresa, and Zaha as the names for their classes instead.
