= Ring roads in Singapore =

There are several ring roads in Singapore which aid relieving congestion on arterial road running through a town or area. These rings roads are usually served by a feeder bus service or complemented by a Light rail line, such as the Bukit Panjang LRT in Bukit Panjang.

== Woodlands Ring Road ==
Woodlands Ring Road is a road in Singapore, that is a smaller road at Admiralty, Singapore.

== Yishun Ring Road ==
Yishun Ring Road is a road in Singapore, that encircles Yishun.

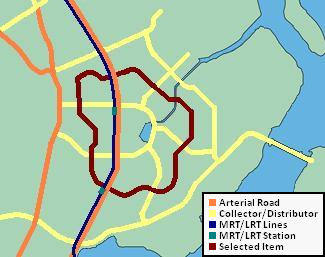
Yishun Ring Road is colored brown on this map.

== Bukit Panjang Ring Road ==
Bukit Panjang Ring Road is a ring road in Singapore that mostly runs parallel to the loop on the Bukit Panjang LRT line. The road runs through most of the residential neighbourhood in the area and aids in reliving traffic from Bukit Panjang Road and Woodlands Road.

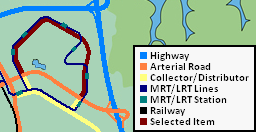
Bukit Panjang Ring Road is colored brown on this map.
