= Hillion Mall =

Suburban shopping mall in Bukit Panjang, Singapore

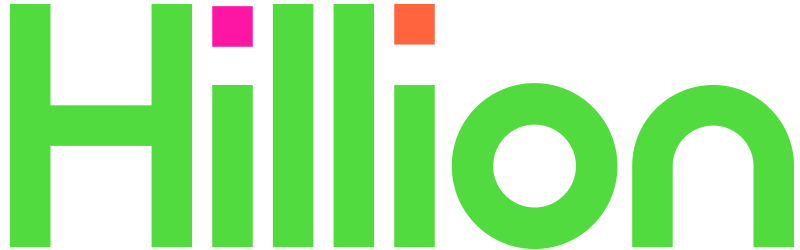

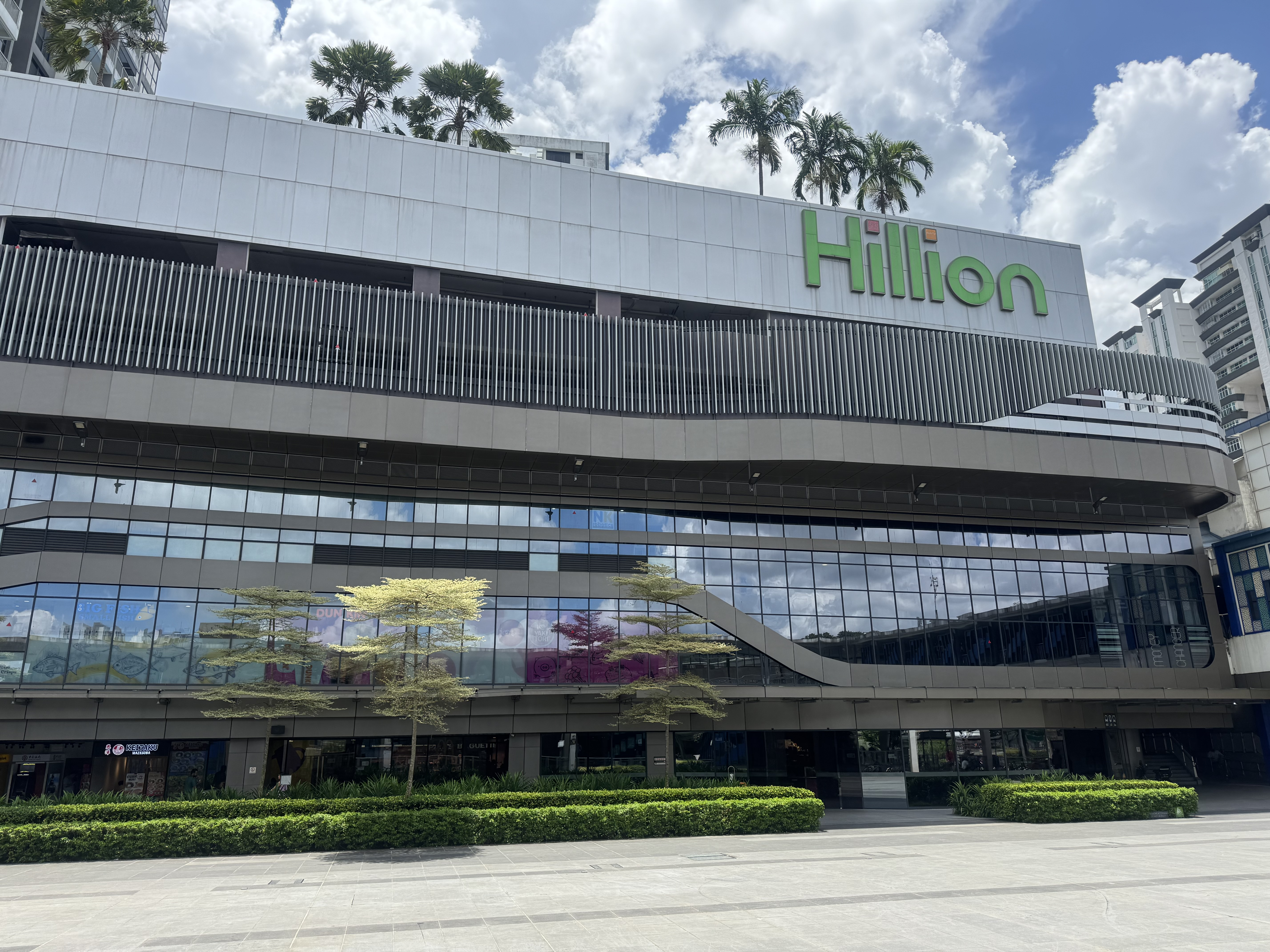
- Hillion Mall in 2025
- Location: Bukit Panjang, Singapore
- Coordinates: 1.378498°N 103.763331°E
- Address: 17 Petir Road, Singapore 678278
- Opened: 24 February 2017; 9 years ago
- Developer: Sim Lian Group
- Owner: Sim Lian Group
- Architect: Design Link Architects
- Num. of stores: >100
- Floor area: 240,035.2 square feet (22,300.00 m^{2})
- Floors: 4
- Public transit: DT1 BP6 Bukit Panjang; Bukit Panjang
- Website: Hillion Mall

Hillion Mall is a suburban shopping centre that is part of the Bukit Panjang Integrated Transport Hub located in Bukit Panjang, Singapore.

The mall is anchored by NTUC FairPrice, Kopitiam, Amore Fitness and Boutique Spa and PCF Sparkletots Preschool. It also shares the building with Hillion Residences above the mall.

== Description ==
It is the first mixed-use development in western Singapore to integrate a retail mall, residential living, bus interchange and both MRT and LRT stations.

The mall consists of four storeys, two above ground and two below ground. It also has an underground carpark. It has open spaces, such as the MRT Plaza and an atrium, meant for events and promotional sales.

The first floor of the mall is split into two sections, Seoul Street and Asian Fusion, being separated by the bus interchange in the middle. Both sections mainly consist of restaurants. The second floor houses Kopitiam, Subway, medical facilities and childcare educational facilities.

Basement 1 houses Best Denki(Closed; Now converted into many shops), a McDonald's, Krispy Kreme, mobile carriers, among other miscellaneous shops. Basement 2 mainly consists of NTUC FairPrice, some fast food outlets and smaller shops for fashion and accessories and food and beverages. The MRT station is connected by Exit D through an underpass at Basement 3, and both the LRT station and bus interchange is connected on Level 1.

== History ==
Originally, the plot of land that Hillion was located on was used to house the former Bukit Panjang Bus Interchange, which opened on 26 December 1999. Only after 12 years of operation, the interchange closed down on 16 December 2012, just 10 days shy of its thirteenth year of operations.

All bus routes originating from there were redirected to begin from bus stops near the old interchange. Most bus services operated from the former Bukit Panjang Temporary Bus Park. Construction of the integrated transport hub began in 2013 and was completed on 24 February 2017.

== Transport ==
Bukit Panjang Bus Interchange is located within the building at Level 2. The mall is diagonally opposite Bukit Panjang Plaza and is adjacent to Bukit Panjang station on the Downtown MRT and Bukit Panjang LRT lines.
