= Zhenghua Park =

Park in Singapore

Coordinates: 1.3814°N 103.7702°E

Zhenghua Park is a nature park in Singapore bounded by Bukit Timah Expressway (BKE), BKE Slip Road to Kranji Expressway (KJE), and Dairy Farm Road.

== History ==
The park was built between the PUB pipeline reserve and the Bukit Timah Expressway (BKE), near the Bukit Panjang housing estate.

== Visitor Info ==
The 13.5 ha park provides a number of activities for its visitors; including cycling, hiking and has other facilities such as the playground and fitness equipment.

The park hosts over twenty species of tree including rubber trees.

The park and the surrounding area are dangerous to visit, with the risk of wild boar attacks.

== See also ==
- List of parks in Singapore
- National Parks Board
