= Bukit Panjang Bus Interchange =

Bus Interchange at Bukit Panjang New Town, Singapore

Bukit Panjang Bus Interchange 武吉班让巴士转换站 Pusat Pertukaran Bas Bukit Panjang
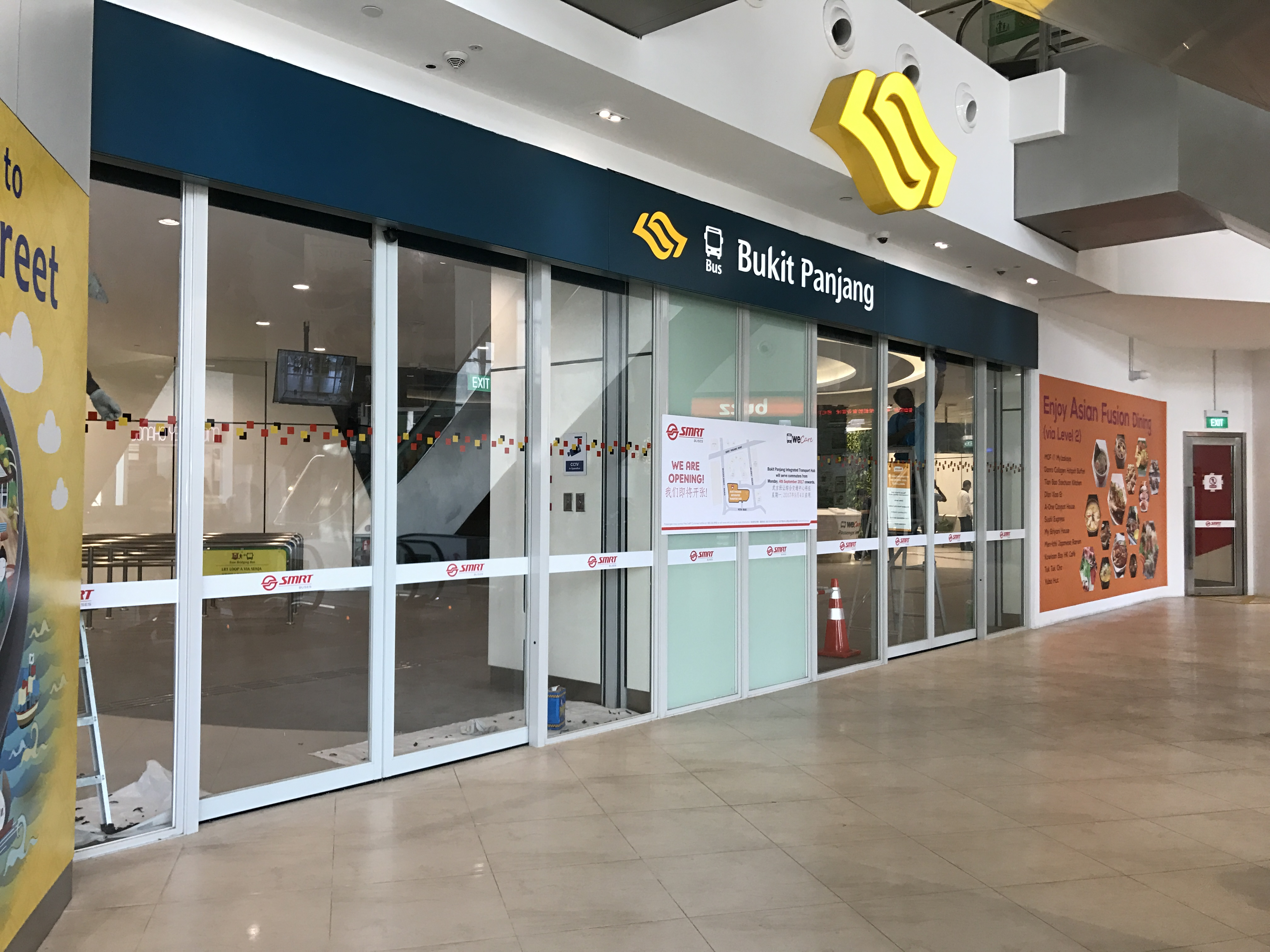
- Bukit Panjang Bus Interchange in final touches before the opening.

General information
- Location: 15 Petir Road, Singapore 678270
- System: Public Bus Interchange
- Owner: Land Transport Authority
- Operator: SMRT Buses
- Bus routes: 11 (SMRT Buses)
- Bus stands: 2 Alighting Berths; 3 Sawtooth Boarding Berths
- Bus operators: SMRT Buses
- Connections: DT1 – BP6 Bukit Panjang

Construction
- Structure type: At-grade
- Accessible: Accessible alighting/boarding points Accessible public toilets Graduated kerb edges Tactile guidance system

History
- Opened: 26 December 1999; 26 years ago (Old); 4 September 2017; 9 years ago (Integrated Transport Hub)
- Closed: 15 December 2012; 13 years ago (Redevelopment)

Key dates
- 26 December 1999: Commenced operations
- 16 December 2012: Operations transferred to bus stops around Bukit Panjang Interchange
- 4 September 2017: Operations transferred to new and air-conditioned bus interchange as Integrated Transport Hub
Location

Bukit Panjang Bus Interchange is an air-conditioned bus interchange located at Bukit Panjang, serving residential areas around Bukit Panjang, Cashew, Teck Whye and Yew Tee. It is the ninth air-conditioned bus interchange in Singapore, integrated within the Hillion Mall and Hillion Residences, and seamlessly connected to Bukit Panjang station. Nearby public amenities include the Bukit Panjang Plaza, Junction 10 and Senja-Cashew Community Centre.

== History ==
In order to make way for the development of the Bukit Panjang Integrated Transport Hub (ITH), the interchange was planned to be closed for two years from 16 December 2012 until 2015 when the new ITH would be ready, and buses were rerouted to a temporary bus park, with the exception of Services 177 & 180, which were amended to loop around Bukit Panjang LRT instead.

The opening of this new interchange was delayed by two years due to difficulties faced during construction in fully integrating the ITH with the Bukit Panjang MRT station. The new Bukit Panjang Bus Interchange, located within Hillion Mall, was eventually opened on 4 September 2017 as part of the new Bukit Panjang Integrated Transport Hub. The temporary bus park continued to serve 5 services: 75, 184, 700, 700A & 971E. The remaining services were rerouted back to the new interchange with the exception of Service 177 & 180. Later, Service 180 was amended to loop at the interchange in 2018. Service 971E was later renumbered to Service 971 in 2020, then withdrawn in 2022. In 2020, Services 700 & 700A were withdrawn, while 75 & 184 were rerouted to the newly opened Gali Batu Bus Terminal in 2021, following which the temporary bus park was then shut down.

A new bus service, 455, began operation after being renumbered from 979X on 24 November 2025. It replaced service 979, which plied a similar route.

== Bus contracting model ==
Under the bus contracting model, all bus services operating from Bukit Panjang Bus Interchange are under the Choa Chu Kang-Bukit Panjang bus package, operated by the anchor operator, SMRT Buses Ltd.

=== List of bus services ===
Operator	Package	Service	Berth	Destination	Remarks
SMRT Buses	Choa Chu Kang–Bukit Panjang	176	B3	Bukit Merah	—N/a
SMRT Buses	Choa Chu Kang–Bukit Panjang	180 (Note: Bus service 180 does not terminate at Bukit Panjang Interchange. Instead, it loops within the interchange back to Boon Lay Bus Interchange.)	B1	Boon Lay	En-route stop
SMRT Buses	Choa Chu Kang–Bukit Panjang	180A	B1	Bukit Panjang Road (Blk 183)	Short trip service / En-route stop
SMRT Buses	Choa Chu Kang–Bukit Panjang	455	B3	↺ Choa Chu Kang Crescent	Weekday morning & evening peak hours
SMRT Buses	Choa Chu Kang–Bukit Panjang	920	B3	↺ Bangkit Road	—N/a
SMRT Buses	Choa Chu Kang–Bukit Panjang	922	B2	↺ Bangkit Road	—N/a
SMRT Buses	Choa Chu Kang–Bukit Panjang	970	B1	Shenton Way	—N/a
SMRT Buses	Choa Chu Kang–Bukit Panjang	972	B2	↺ Orchard Road	—N/a
SMRT Buses	Choa Chu Kang–Bukit Panjang	972A	B2	Orchard Road (Dhoby Ghaut Station)	Short trip service
SMRT Buses	Choa Chu Kang–Bukit Panjang	972M	B2	↺ Orchard Road	—N/a
SMRT Buses	Choa Chu Kang–Bukit Panjang	973	B1	↺ Hume Avenue	—N/a
SMRT Buses	Choa Chu Kang–Bukit Panjang	973A	B1	Pending Road (Bef Pending Station)	Short trip service
SMRT Buses	Choa Chu Kang–Bukit Panjang	975	B2	↺ Lim Chu Kang Road	—N/a
SMRT Buses	Choa Chu Kang–Bukit Panjang	975C	B2	Lim Chu Kang Road (Police Coast Guard)	Short trip service
SMRT Buses	Choa Chu Kang–Bukit Panjang	976	B3	Choa Chu Kang	—N/a
SMRT Buses	Choa Chu Kang–Bukit Panjang	979	B3	↺ Choa Chu Kang Crescent	—N/a

== Gallery ==
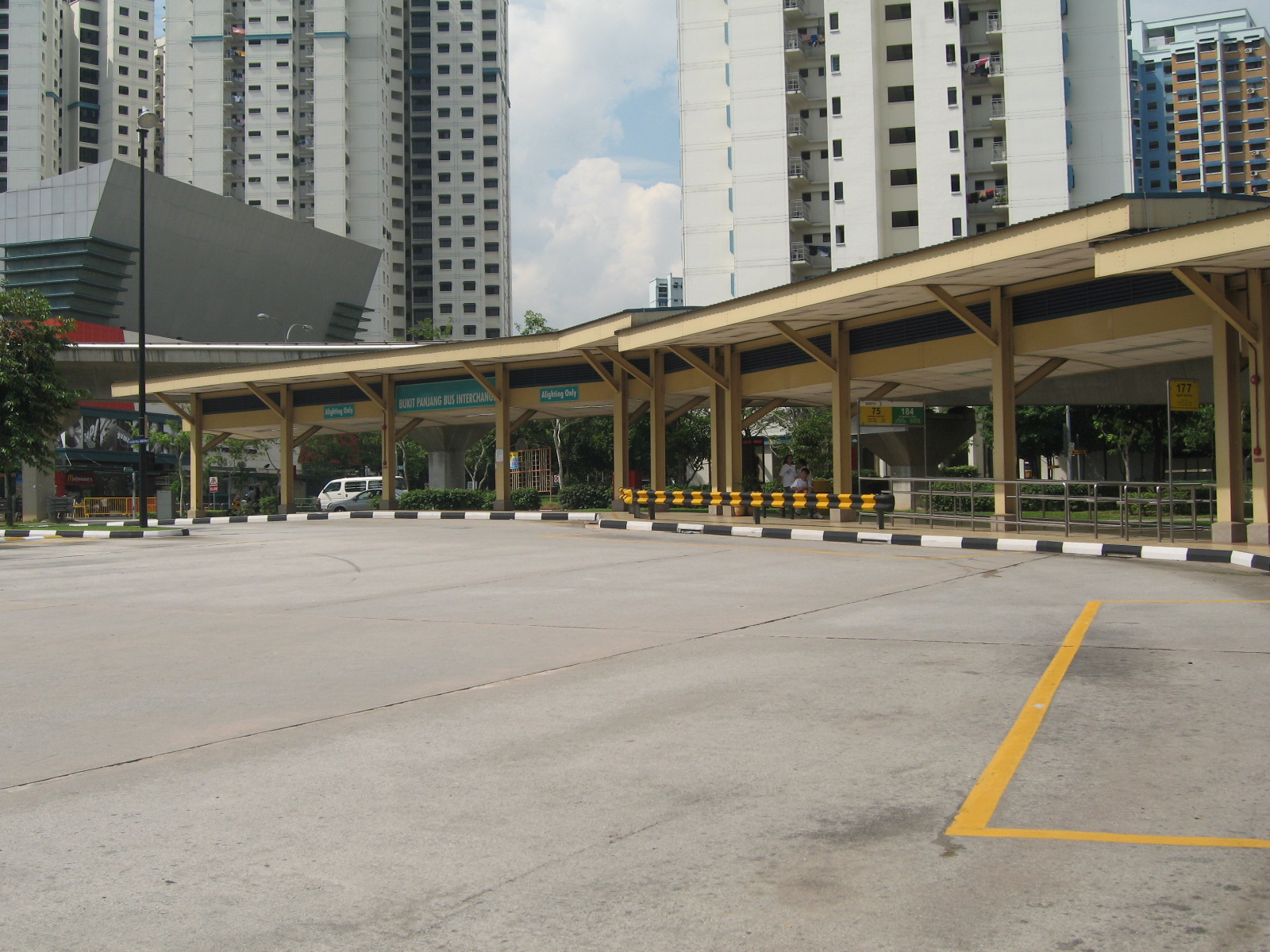
Old Bukit Panjang Bus Interchange.

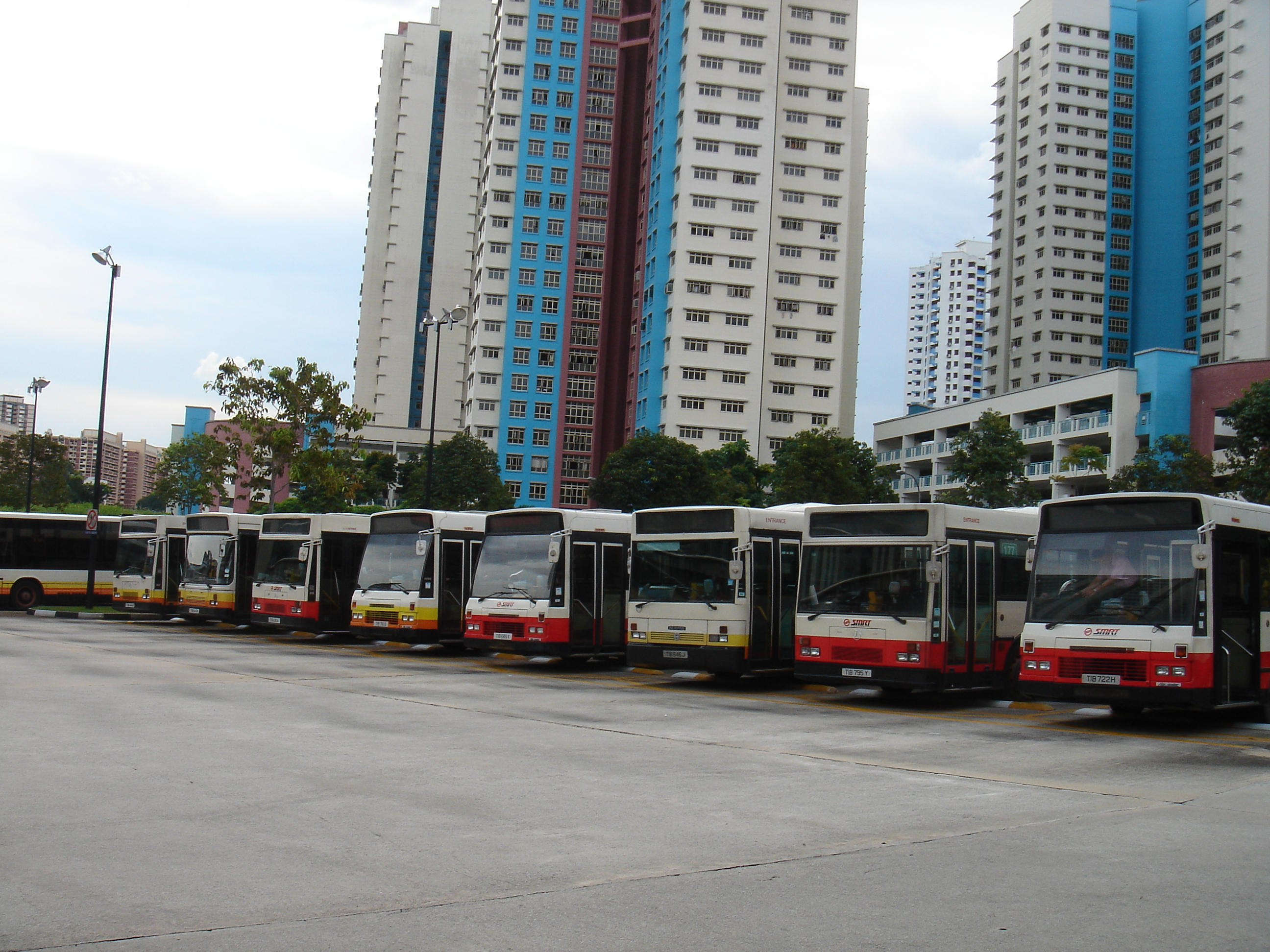
Old Buses in the Old Bukit Panjang Bus Interchange.

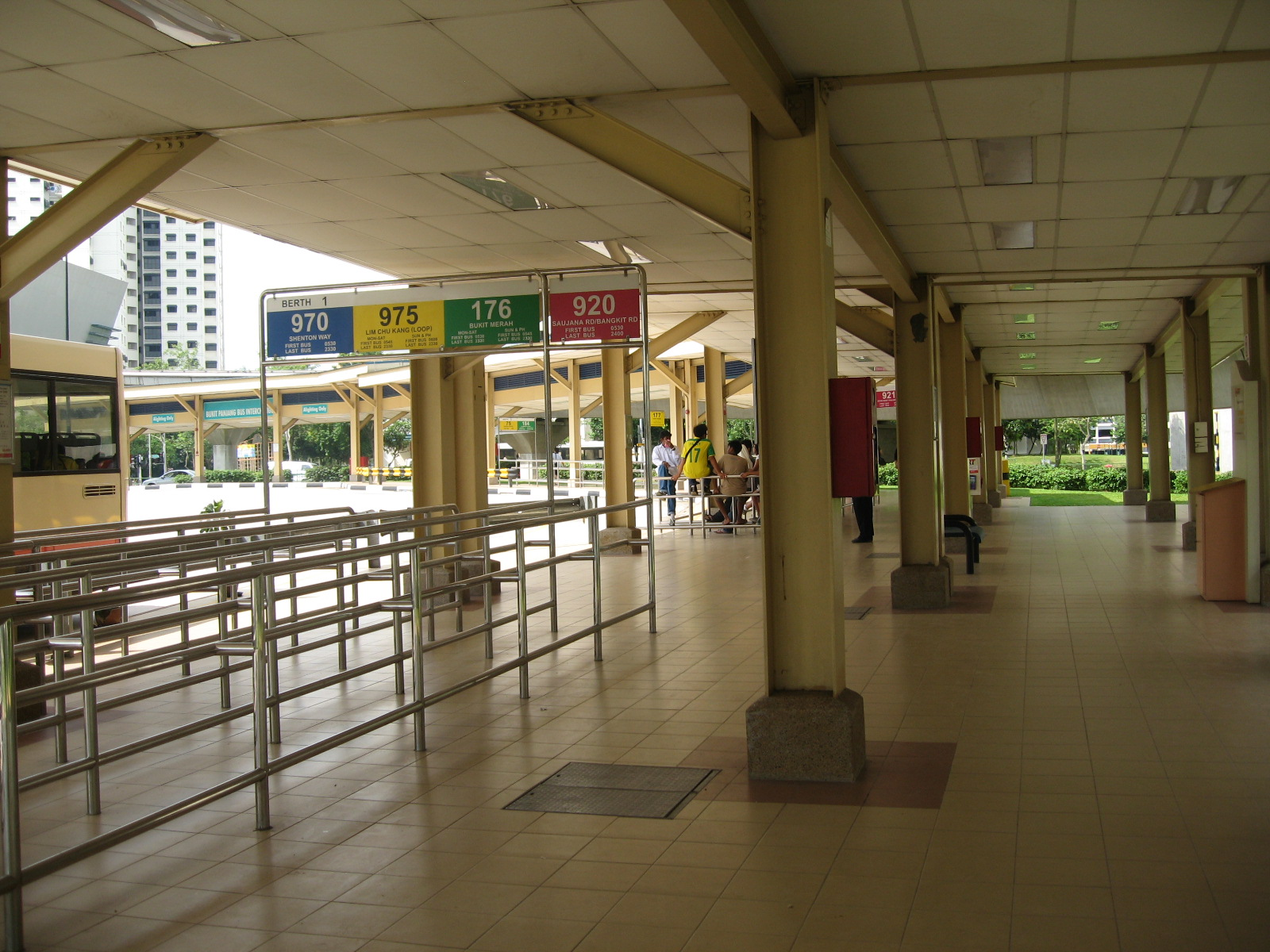
Berths in the Old Bukit Panjang Bus Interchange.
