= Bukit Panjang =

Planning area and residential town in North West Region, Singapore

Bukit Panjang new town
- Planning Area and HDB Town

Other transcription(s)
  - Malay: Bukit Panjang (Rumi) بوکيت ڤنجڠ (Jawi)
  - Chinese: 武吉班让 (Simplified) 武吉班讓 (Traditional); Wǔjí Bānràng (Pinyin); Bú-kit Pan-jiāng (Hokkien POJ)
  - Tamil: புக்கிட் பாஞ்சாங் Pukkiṭ Pāñcāṅ (Transliteration)
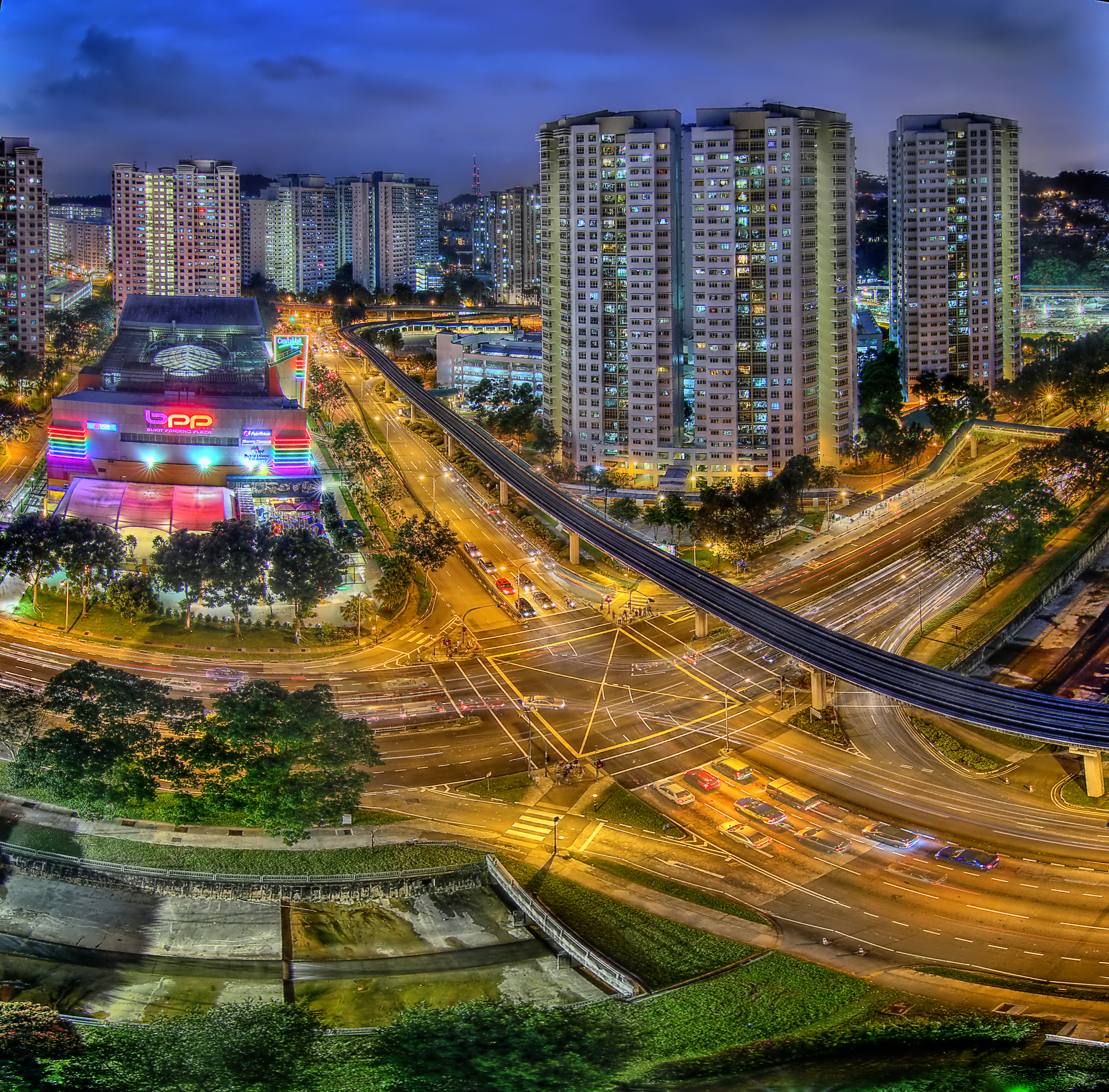
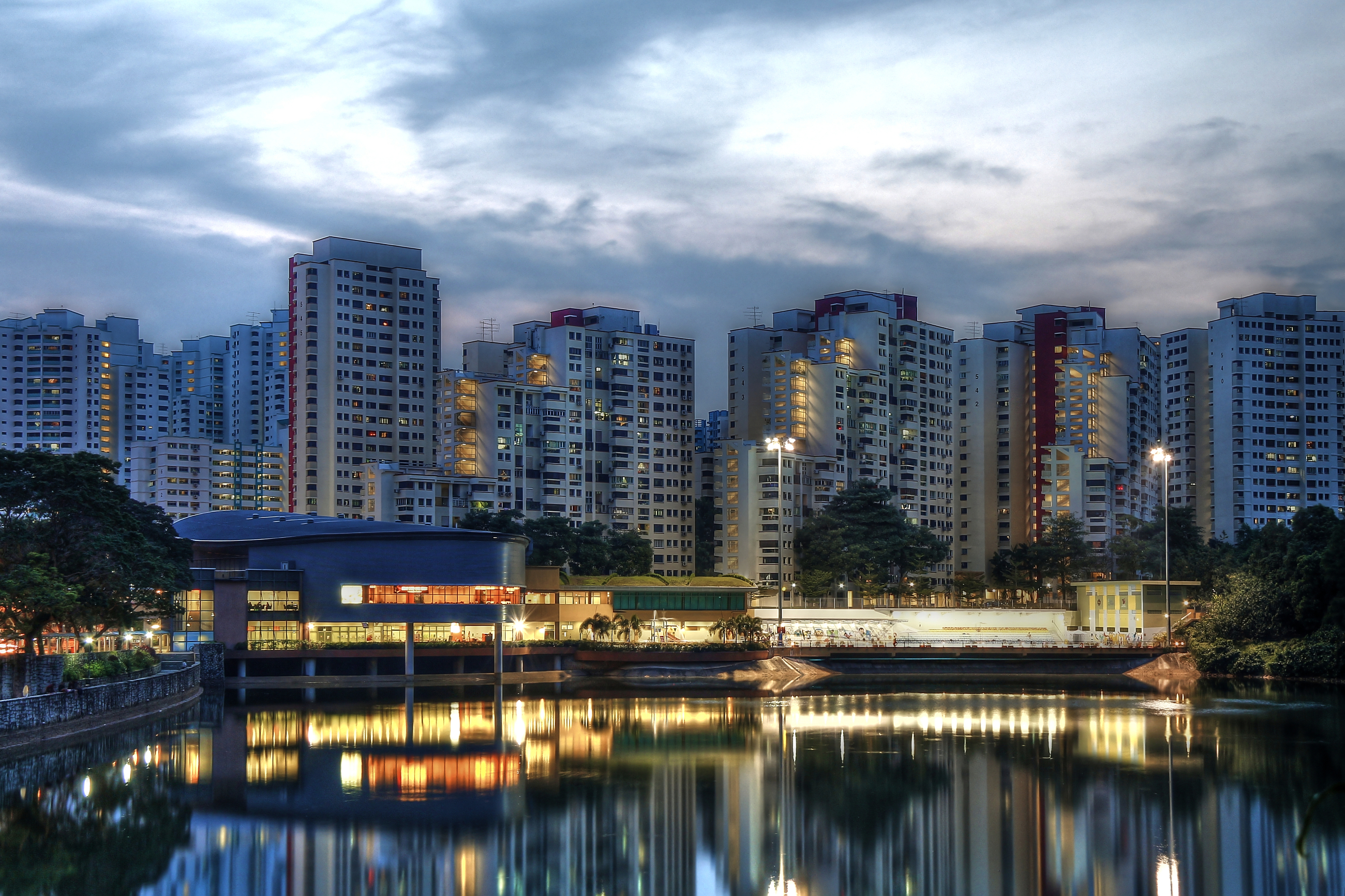
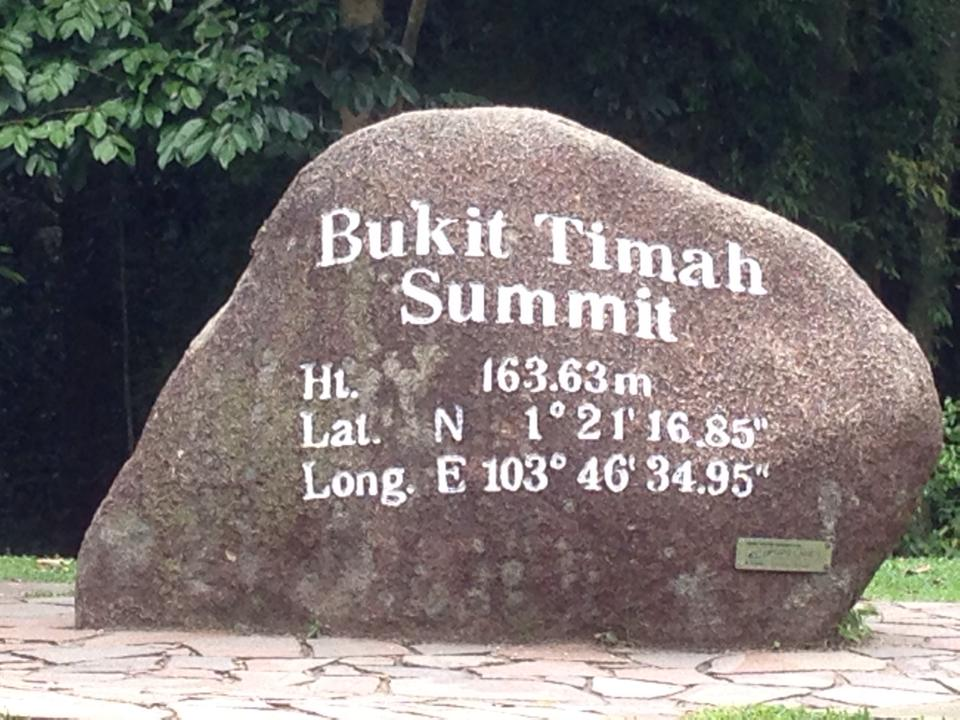
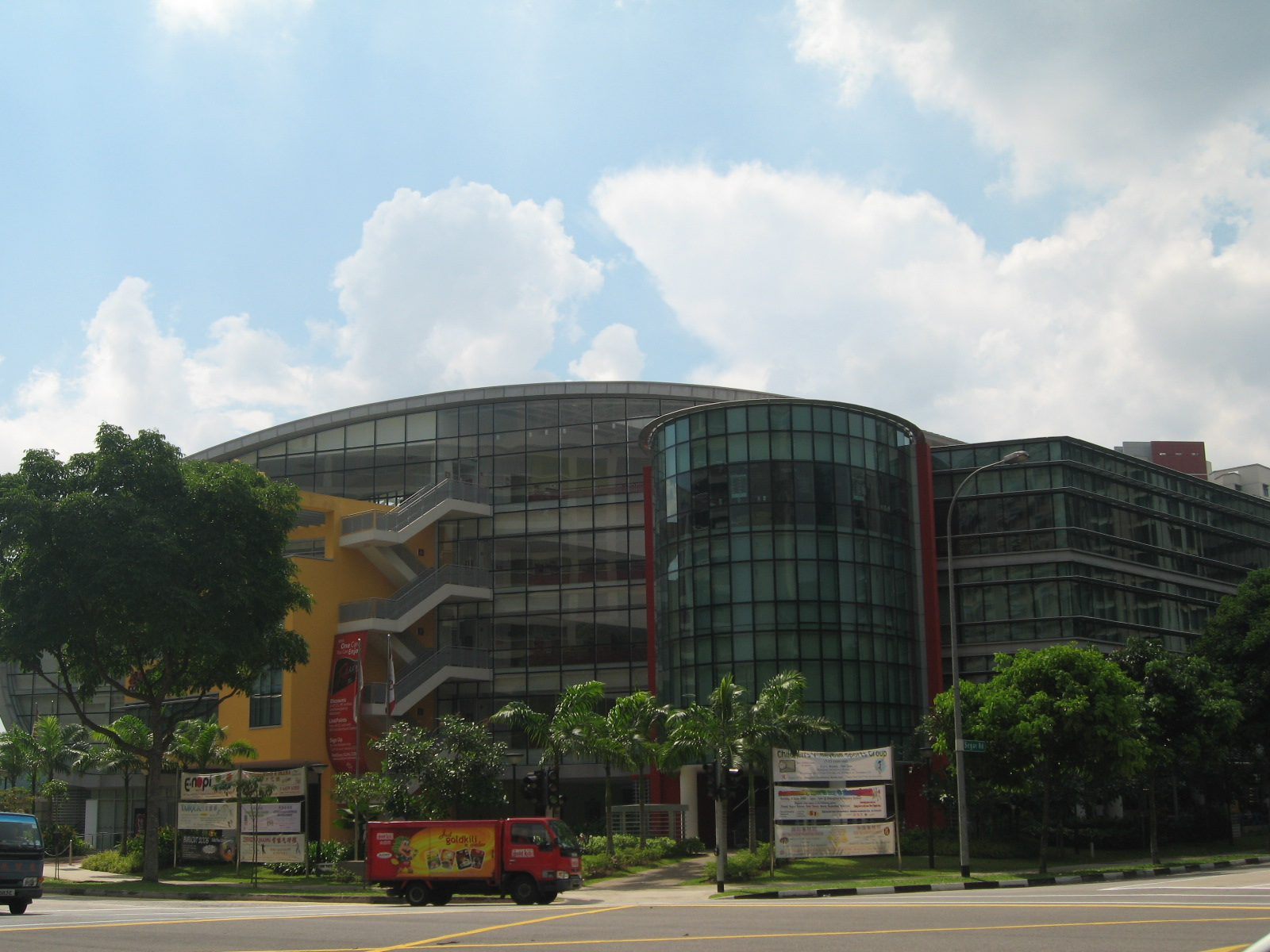
- Clockwise: A busy intersection between Bukit Panjang Road and Bukit Panjang Ring Road, Pang Sua Pond with HDB flats in the background, Zhenghua Community Club, Summit of Bukit Timah Hill

- Location of Bukit Panjang in Singapore

- Location of Bukit Panjang within Singapore
- Coordinates: 1°22′51.00″N 103°45′45.00″E
- Country: Singapore
- Region: West Region
- CDC: North West CDC
- Town councils: Holland-Bukit Panjang Town Council
- Constituencies: Bukit Panjang SMC; Holland-Bukit Timah GRC

Government
  - Mayor: North West CDC: Alex Yam
  - Members of Parliament: Bukit Panjang SMC: Liang Eng Hwa; Holland-Bukit Timah GRC: Edward Chia (Zhenghua); Vivian Balakrishnan (Cashew)

Area
  - Total: 9.02 km^{2} (3.48 sq mi)
  - Residential: 2.19 km^{2} (0.85 sq mi)

Population (2026)
  - Total: 135,110
  - Density: 15,000/km^{2} (38,800/sq mi)
- Demonym: Bukit Panjang resident

Ethnic groups (2025)
  - Chinese: 99,790
  - Malays: 22,130
  - Indians: 10,530
  - Others: 3,920
- Postal districts: 21, 23 (Note: Only the Nature Reserve subzone is in postal district 21. The rest of the planning area is in postal district 23.)
- Postal sector: 58, 67 (Note: Only the Nature Reserve subzone is in postal sector 58. The rest of the planning area is in postal sector 67.)
- Dwelling units: 34,463
- Projected ultimate: 44,000

Bukit Panjang
- Traditional Chinese: 武吉班讓
- Simplified Chinese: 武吉班让
Transcriptions
Standard Mandarin
- Hanyu Pinyin: Wǔjí Bānràng
- IPA: [ù.tɕǐ.pán.ɻâŋ]

Bukit Panjang (/ˈbʊkɪt ˌpɑːndʒɑːŋ/ BUUK-it PAHN-jahng) is a planning area and residential town located in the West Region of Singapore. A portion of this town is situated on a low-lying elongated hill. The planning area is bounded by Bukit Batok to the west, Choa Chu Kang to the northwest, Sungei Kadut to the north, the Central Water Catchment to the east, and Bukit Timah to the south. Bukit Panjang New Town is located at the northern portion of the planning area. Bukit Panjang has an average elevation of 36m/118 ft.

The town is categorised into seven subzones, namely Jelebu, Bangkit, Fajar, Saujana, Senja, Dairy Farm, and Nature Reserve.

== Etymology ==
Bukit Panjang means "long hill" in Malay. It gets its name from the low hills which end south to Bukit Timah. The roads in the town are named after the old 1960s kampung tracks (Lorong Petir, Lorong Pending, Jalan Fajar, Jalan Senja) which used to ply the area.

== History ==
Historical maps from 1911 to 1978 indicate Bukit Panjang hill with a peak of 434 feet (132 m) between Choa Chu Kang Road and Upper Bukit Timah Road, near the Lian Hup Quarry and present-day MINDEF Building. Quarrying activities likely flattened the hill. (Note: Credit for research to https://ijamestann.blogspot.com/2012/07/i-found-bukit-panjang.html and https://historydelocalized.blogspot.com/2020/09/the-rise-and-fall-of-bukit-panjang.html?m=1)

In the mid 1800s, settlements emerged at the 10th milestone of Bukit Timah Road, near Bukit Panjang hill. The term '10th mile' is preserved in the naming of Ten Mile Junction LRT Station, Ten Mile Junction Depot and the Junction 10 shopping mall. Then, the area was home to gambier and pepper planters, and these settlements expanded northwards to Kranji in 1845 with the extension of Bukit Timah Road - as Kranji Road and then renamed to Woodlands Road.

From 1903 to an unknown date, Bukit Panjang railway station on the Singapore–Kranji Railway served the Bukit Panjang settlements and plantations. The station was located along present-day Choa Chu Kang Road, near the junction of Woodlands Road, Bukit Panjang Road and Upper Bukit Timah Road. The right-of-way is preserved as part of the Rail Corridor. The station was incorporated into the Federated Malay States Railways, allowing for northwards journeys to Woodlands, Johor Bahru and Kuala Lumpur and southwards journeys to Holland Road, Newton, Tank Road and Pasir Panjang. Trains carried both passengers, goods, mail and stone from Mandai Quarry. In 1932, the railway south of Bukit Panjang station was realigned, with the new route running through a new station at Bukit Timah, Tanglin, Alexandra and Tanjong Pagar. At some point since then, new stations at Woodlands and Kranji also opened, with only Mandai and Bukit Panjang stations from the old alignment continuing to be in use.

In 1912, The Singapore Free Press and Mercantile Advertiser reported that business magnate Ong Sam Leong tapped the first tree of the Bukit Panjang Rubber Estate, located 10.5 miles from the town.

In 1957, the Singapore Improvement Trust (SIT) launched Bukit Panjang Estate - this was later renamed to Teck Whye Estate, which was along present day Jalan Teck Whye. The land of the Bukit Panjang Estate and settlements are in present day Choa Chu Kang Central and Teck Whye. These flats were sold as low-cost alternatives for those working in the Bukit Timah region. These SIT flats faced heat-trapping issues, resulting in petitions and community meetings by the residents to escalate the issue.

The Bukit Panjang Community Centre and the one at Jalan Kong Kuan served the community in tackling different local and national issues, also engaging in charity events.

When Bukit Panjang Secondary School shifted to the new premises along Jalan Teck Whye in 1959, the first cohort had no desks and chairs for the first two weeks - when the furniture arrived two weeks later, all rushed to move them in. They also transformed the barren land behind the school into a field.. The English stream Bukit Panjang Secondary School merged with the Chinese stream Choa Chu Kang Government Chinese Middle School, becoming the first integrated government secondary school, Bukit Panjang Government High School.

In 1960, a fund drive to build a mosque was started for one in Bukit Panjang, the nearest mosque then was over seven miles away. The Lembaga Masjid Jamik was constructed along Choa Chu Kang Road with the help of more than 100 volunteers to clear the site. Since then, this mosque has been renamed to Al-Khair Mosque and moved to Teck Whye Crescent. (Note: The area of Teck Whye Crescent would have been in what was considered Bukit Panjang then.)

In 1986, during the planning and construction of the Branch Line (Bukit Line, now incorporated into the North-South Line), the then terminus was named Bukit Panjang before being changed to Choa Chu Kang.

Part of what was considered the area of Bukit Panjang was incorporated into Choa Chu Kang New Town, particularly the land west of Woodlands Road / Upper Bukit Timah Road. Bukit Panjang New Town expanded eastwards towards the Kranji Expressway and Bukit Timah Expressway.

Modern Bukit Panjang is a suburban town in western Singapore. Before redevelopment, Kampong Bukit Panjang used to exist in the area. Initially, instead of using the original place name, Bukit Panjang, there were plans to open up the new town using the name, Zhenghua, derived from Jalan Cheng Hwa that used to ply the area. However, Bukit Panjang was quickly reinstated following complaints, being the only town in Singapore where the change was reversed. Development of the town and advanced earthworks begun on 15 June 1981. In 1981, S$96 million was spent on widening canals to help prevent flooding in low-lying areas. Housing and Development Board (HDB) flats rose up by 20 May 1985, but only Blocks 1xx and 2xx were built so far. Neighbourhood 4 was up and running by 1989, and followed by Neighbourhood 5 and 6 which was the recent ones since 1995.

Bukit Panjang MRT/LRT station, Hillion Mall — which houses the Bukit Panjang Bus Interchange, and Bukit Panjang Plaza form the town centre, making up the transport and commercial core of the town. In addition, there are three neighbourhood centres spread across the town, which are Bukit Panjang Neighbourhood Centre (256-260 Bangkit Road), Fajar Shopping Centre and Greenridge Shopping Centre.

== Demographics ==
=== Population history ===
Historical resident population
Year	Pop.	±% p.a.
2000	96,560	—
2005	119,720	+4.39%
2010	128,730	+1.46%
2015	139,030	+1.55%
2020	138,270	−0.11%
2025	136,360	−0.28%
2026	135,110	−0.92%

=== Age profile ===
The data below is from the population report published by the Singapore Department of Statistics as of June 2026.

Age group (years)	Males	Females	Total population	% of total population
0–4	2,470	2,240	4,710	3.49
5–9	2,950	2,820	5,770	4.27
10–14	3,510	3,350	6,860	5.08
15–19	3,500	3,500	7,000	5.18
20–24	3,850	3,760	7,610	5.63
25–29	4,570	4,450	9,020	6.68
30–34	4,850	4,810	9,660	7.15
35–39	4,890	5,420	10,310	7.63
40–44	4,440	4,900	9,340	6.91
45–49	4,240	4,790	9,030	6.68
50–54	4,610	5,120	9,730	7.20
55–59	4,620	4,930	9,550	7.07
60–64	5,100	5,500	10,600	7.84
65–69	4,970	4,970	9,940	7.36
70–74	3,600	3,650	7,250	5.37
75–79	2,310	2,390	4,700	3.48
80–84	930	1,180	2,110	1.56
85–89	480	780	1,260	0.93
90+	220	460	680	0.50

Age group (years)	Males	Females	Total population	% of total population
0–14	8,930	8,410	17,340	12.8
15–64	44,670	47,180	91,850	68.0
65+	12,510	13,430	25,940	19.2

Population pyramid of Bukit Panjang in 2026

The population distribution of Bukit Panjang in 2026 demonstrates an ageing population structure. There is a higher population concentration among the older working-age population, with males and females both peaking at the 60–64 age range at 3.8% and 4.1% respectively.

=== Household ===
Resident population by dwelling type in Bukit Panjang (2000−2026)
Year	HDB flats		Condominiums and other apartments		Landed properties	
Year	Pop.	Percentage	Pop.	Percentage	Pop.	Percentage
2000	86,000	89.1%	7,920	8.2%	2,540	2.6%
2005	105,890	88.4%	10,980	9.2%	2,780	2.3%
2010	112,900	87.7%	12,600	9.8%	2,990	2.3%
2015	120,000	86.3%	15,610	11.2%	3,220	2.3%
2020	115,840	83.8%	19,050	13.8%	3,190	2.3%
2025	112,590	82.6%	20,050	14.7%	3,150	2.3%
2026	110,980	82.1%	20,380	15.1%	3,140	2.3%

As of 2026, the percentage of residents in Bukit Panjang residing in HDB flats (82.1%) is higher than the national proportion of HDB dwellers (75.5%), reflecting a greater prevalence of public housing in the area.

Among the population, 51,870 residents, or 38.4% of the population, live in 4-Room Flats, making it the most common type of dwelling.

As of 2025, the average household size in Bukit Panjang is approximately 3.16. Among the 47,700 households in Bukit Panjang, the most common household size is two persons, representing 24.1% of total households. This is closely followed by a household size of three persons, representing 23.5% of all households.

Bukit Panjang has a home ownership rate of 94.8% as of 2025, higher than the national home ownership rate of 91.2%. This reflects a greater prevalence of homeowners in Bukit Panjang.

=== Ethnicity ===
Ethnic groups in Bukit Panjang (2000−2020)
Year	Chinese		Malays		Indians		Others	
Year	Pop.	Percentage	Pop.	Percentage	Pop.	Percentage	Pop.	Percentage
2000	74,266	76.91%	15,798	16.36%	5,735	5.94%	760	0.79%
2010	96,079	74.63%	20,598	16%	9,161	7.12%	2,896	2.25%
2015	103,280	74.29%	22,230	15.99%	10,300	7.41%	3,210	2.31%
2020	102,800	74.35%	21,690	15.69%	10,340	7.48%	3,450	2.5%
2025	99,790	73.2%	22,130	16.2%	10,530	7.7%	3,920	2.9%

Consistent with the rest of Singapore, Bukit Panjang has an ethnically diverse population, with a majority Chinese population, constituting 73.18% of the population as of 2025, slightly lower than the national proportion of 73.95%. In contrast, there is a higher proportion of Malays (16.23%) compared to the national proportion of 13.54%.

=== Religion ===
Religious affiliation in Bukit Panjang (2025 est.)
1. Buddhism (30.7%)
2. No religion (21.2%)
3. Islam (18.4%)
4. Christianity (15.2%)
5. Taoism (9.10%)
6. Hinduism (5.30%)
7. Sikhism (0.20%)

Consistent with the rest of Singapore, the largest religion in Bukit Panjang in 2026 is Buddhism, with 37,600 practising residents (30.72% of the population). The second most common group consists of residents with no religion, with 25,900 residents (21.16%), followed by those practising Islam (22,500 residents, 18.38%). Christianity is practised by 18,600 residents (15.20%), including 8,700 Catholics (7.11%). Other religious affiliations include Taoism (11,100 residents, 9.07%), Hinduism (6,500 residents, 5.31%), and Sikhism (200 residents, 0.16%).

Compared to the national average of 14.99%, there is a substantially higher proportion of residents practising Islam in Bukit Panjang.

=== Education ===
As of 2025, 98.3% of the population aged above 15 is literate, slightly lower than the national average of 98.6%.

75.2% of residents are literate in two languages, with the most common language pair being English and Chinese (51.0%). 6.0% of Bukit Panjang residents are literate in three or more languages.

Highest qualification attained of non-student resident population aged 15 years and over (2025 est.)
Qualification	Percentage	Singapore average
Below secondary	21.4%	19.9%
Secondary	15.9%	14.6%
Post-secondary (non-tertiary)	13.1%	11.1%
Polytechnic diploma	10.2%	10.2%
Professional qualification and other diploma	7.1%	7.5%
University	32.2%	36.7%

As of 2025, the proportion of residents in Bukit Panjang with a university qualification (32.2%) is below the national average of 36.7%.

=== Language ===
Languages most frequently spoken at home, Bukit Panjang (2025 est.)
Languages	percent
English	49.7%
Mandarin Chinese	30.6%
Malay	9.7%
Non-Mandarin varieties	6.0%
Tamil	2.46%
Others	0.98%
Other Indian languages	0.57%

In Bukit Panjang, the proportion of residents using English as the most frequently spoken language (49.7%) is lower than the national average of 58.1%, ranking the third lowest among all planning areas in Singapore. Additionally, there are 3,000 Tamil speakers, representing 78.9% of the 3,800 Indian language speakers in Bukit Panjang.

=== Employment and income ===
According to the 2025 General Household Survey, 80,600 of residents aged 15 years and over in Bukit Panjang are employed, out of the 82,800 in the labour force. This equates to an employment rate of 97.3%, higher than the national average of 96.7%. The remaining 39,600 residents (32.4%) aged above 15 in Bukit Panjang are outside the labour force.

Gross monthly employment income of employed residents aged 15 years and over (2025 est.)
Employment income	Percentage	Singapore average
Below S$1,000	5.1%	3.9%
S$1,000–S$1,999	10.5%	9.4%
S$2,000–S$2,999	11.2%	9.5%
S$3,000–S$3,999	10.8%	10.3%
S$4,000–S$4,999	8.4%	8.8%
S$5,000–S$5,999	8.1%	8.2%
S$6,000–S$6,999	7.4%	6.9%
S$7,000–S$7,999	5.6%	5.9%
S$8,000–S$8,999	5.2%	5.2%
S$9,000–S$9,999	4.8%	4.5%
S$10,000–S$10,999	2.7%	4.3%
S$11,000–S$11,999	3.6%	3.5%
S$12,000–S$14,999	7.6%	7.3%
S$15,000–S$19,999	5.5%	5.8%
S$20,000 and over	3.6%	6.7%

Monthly household employment income (2025 est.)
Household employment income	Percentage	Singapore average
No employed person	12.2%	14.2%
Below S$1,000	1.7%	1.2%
S$1,000–S$1,999	2.3%	3.4%
S$2,000–S$2,999	4.2%	3.7%
S$3,000–S$3,999	4.4%	4.2%
S$4,000–S$4,999	3.1%	3.7%
S$5,000–S$5,999	5.2%	4.1%
S$6,000–S$6,999	4.8%	4.0%
S$7,000–S$7,999	2.7%	3.6%
S$8,000–S$8,999	3.6%	3.8%
S$9,000–S$9,999	3.8%	3.7%
S$10,000–S$10,999	4.0%	3.8%
S$11,000–S$11,999	4.6%	3.7%
S$12,000–S$12,999	5.0%	3.5%
S$13,000–S$13,999	4.0%	3.2%
S$14,000–S$14,999	3.8%	2.8%
S$15,000–S$17,499	6.7%	6.2%
S$17,500–S$19,999	5.9%	5.5%
S$20,000–S$24,999	6.7%	8.0%
S$25,000–S$29,999	4.8%	5.0%
S$30,000–S$34,999	2.3%	3.3%
S$35,000 and over	4.4%	5.5%

== Housing, amenities, and attractions ==
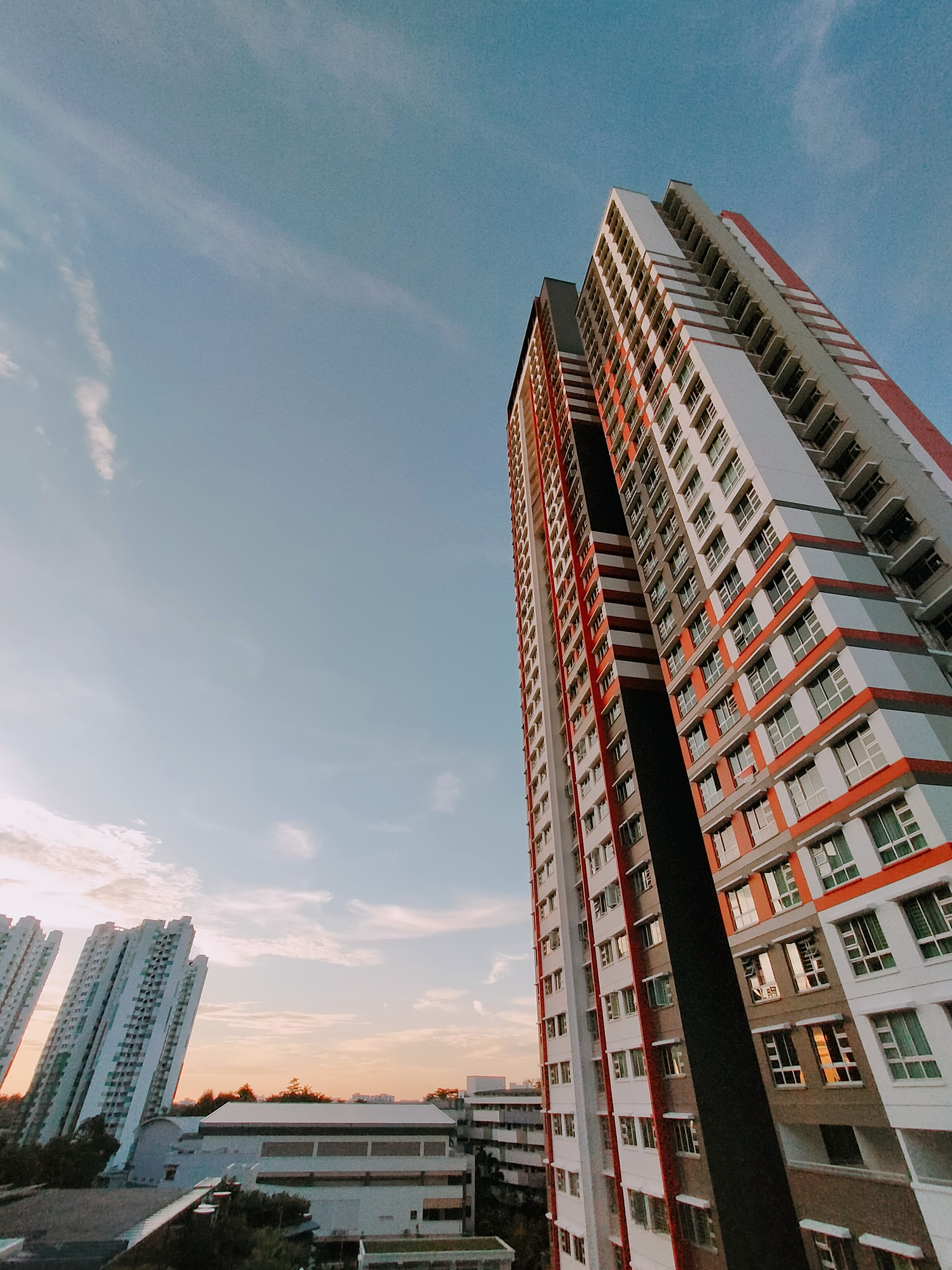
640A Senja Close, a HDB block in Senja, is the tallest building in Bukit Panjang with a total of 38 floors.

Bukit Panjang consists of a mixture of old and new blocks of flats, condominiums and private housing. To date, there are three community centres, namely Bukit Panjang Community Club, Zhenghua Community Club, and Senja-Cashew Community Club, which serve the entertainment, recreational, and educational needs of residents.

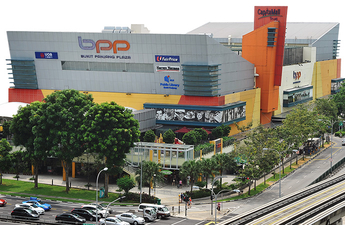
Bukit Panjang Plaza, which is one of the popular malls in Bukit Panjang, before its second major renovation.

Bukit Panjang Plaza is one of the well-known malls in Bukit Panjang. It is located in the heart of Bukit Panjang town and is near Bukit Panjang LRT station, Bukit Panjang MRT station, and Bukit Panjang Bus Interchange. Located on Jelebu Road, the mall has been expanded twice throughout its existence to include more shops in the building. The mall is owned by CapitaRetail which is another retail-based REIT by CapitaLand. The mall houses the Bukit Panjang Public Library as well as a NTUC FairPrice Finest supermarket.

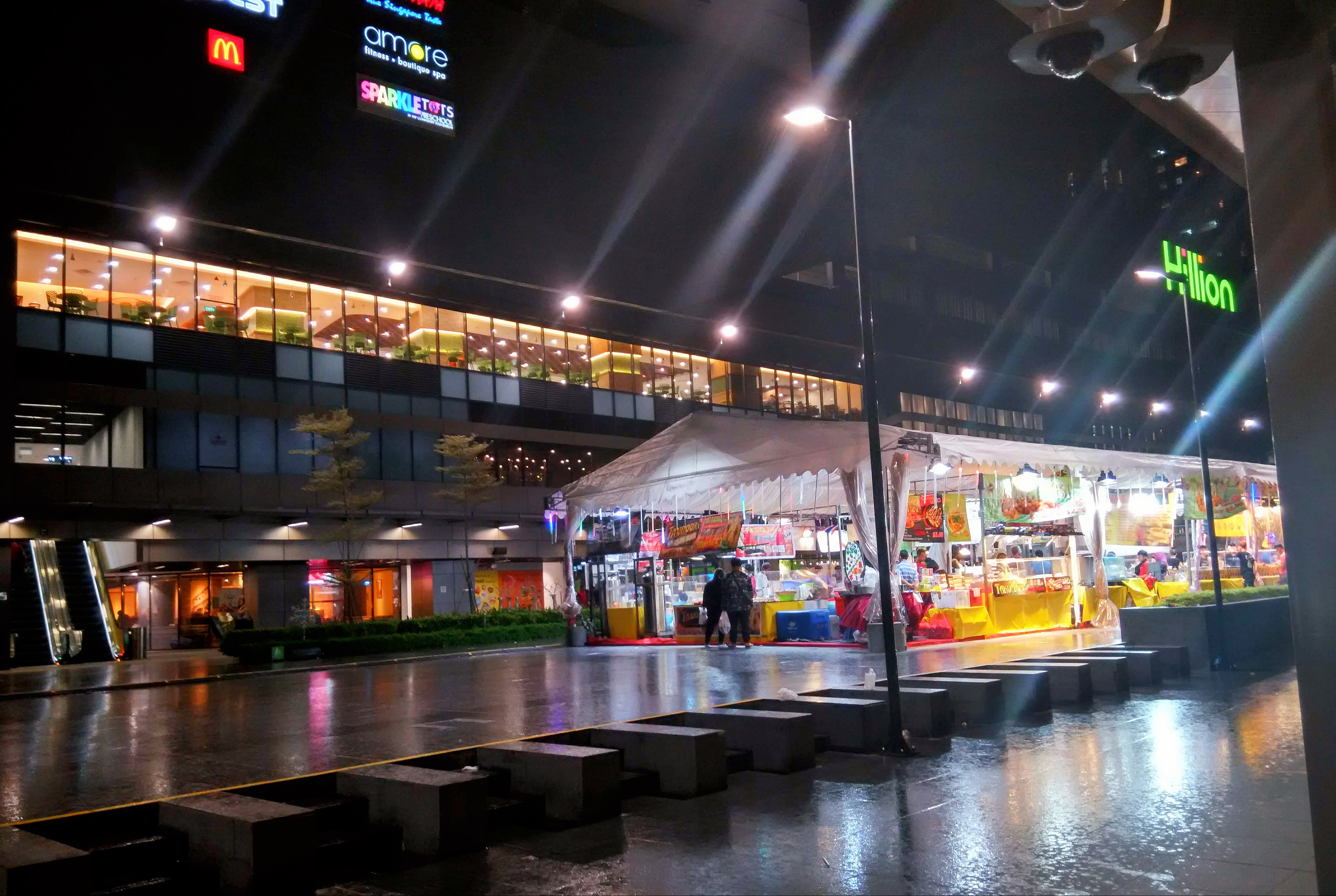
Hillion Mall as viewed from Bukit Panjang MRT station

Hillion Mall is another well-known mall in Bukit Panjang, located along Petir Road. It is one of the more recent commercial facilities, which completed construction and was opened to the public on 24 February 2017. It is part of the Bukit Panjang Integrated Transport Hub, which shares the building with the Bukit Panjang Bus Interchange, and directly links to the Bukit Panjang MRT/LRT station through an underpass and above-ground link way respectively.

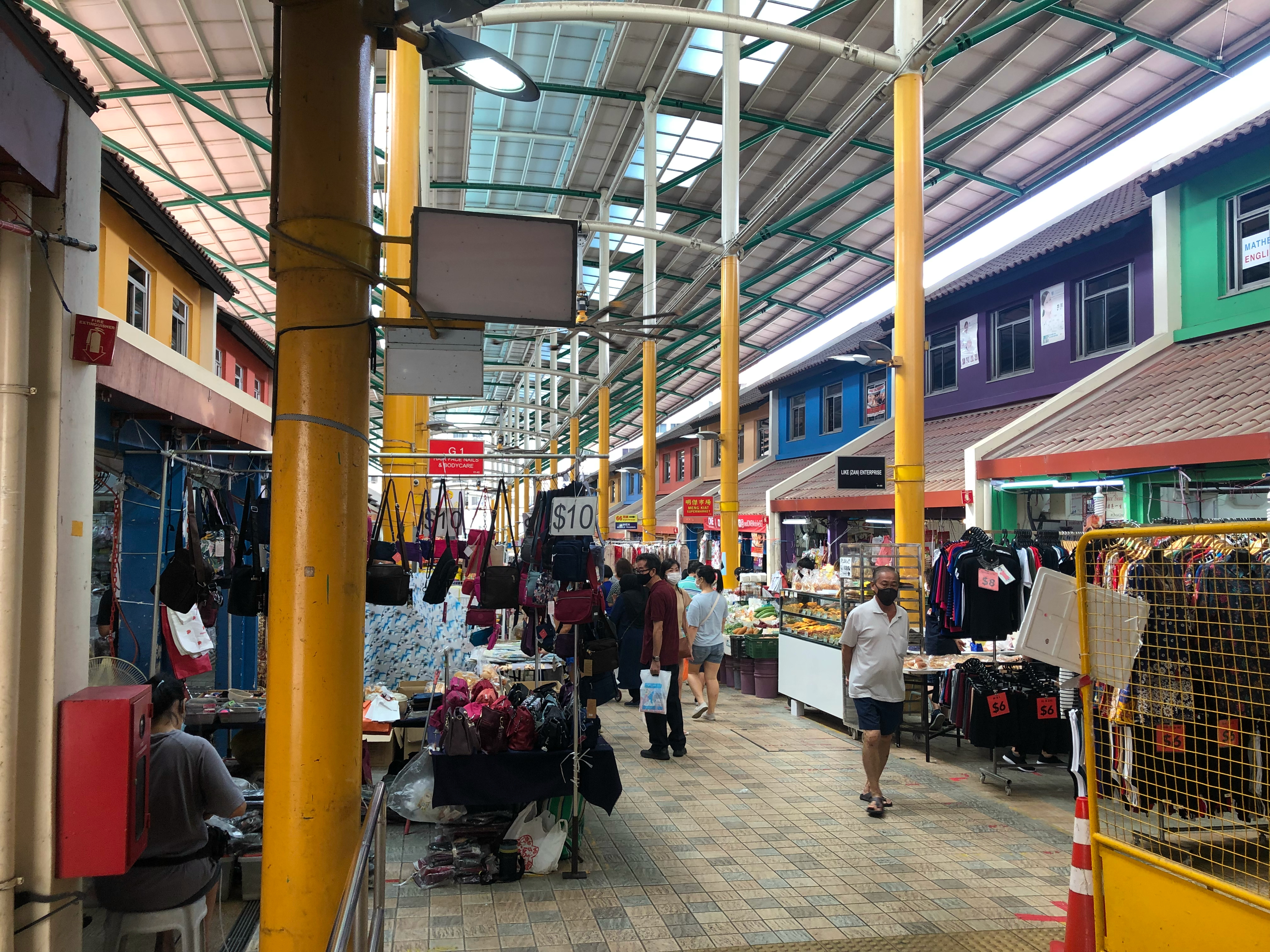
The market at the Bukit Panjang Neighbourhood Centre in Bangkit

There are other smaller commercial buildings equipped with food courts, supermarkets, and other basic shops to meet the basic necessities of the residents. They are commonly located within HDB estates or small standalone buildings. Some of the more iconic buildings include Junction 10 located along Woodlands Road, and the three neighbourhood centres (Fajar Shopping Centre located along Fajar Road, Greenridge Shopping Centre located along Jelapang Road, and the Bukit Panjang Neighbourhood Centre located along Bangkit Road).

Within the neighbourhood consists of two hawker centres; the Bukit Panjang Hawker Centre and Market and the Senja Hawker Centre. The former opened in 2015 while the latter opened in 2022.

A healthcare facility located along Senja Road was opened on 2 October 2021 to house the Bukit Panjang Polyclinic and the Senja Care Home.

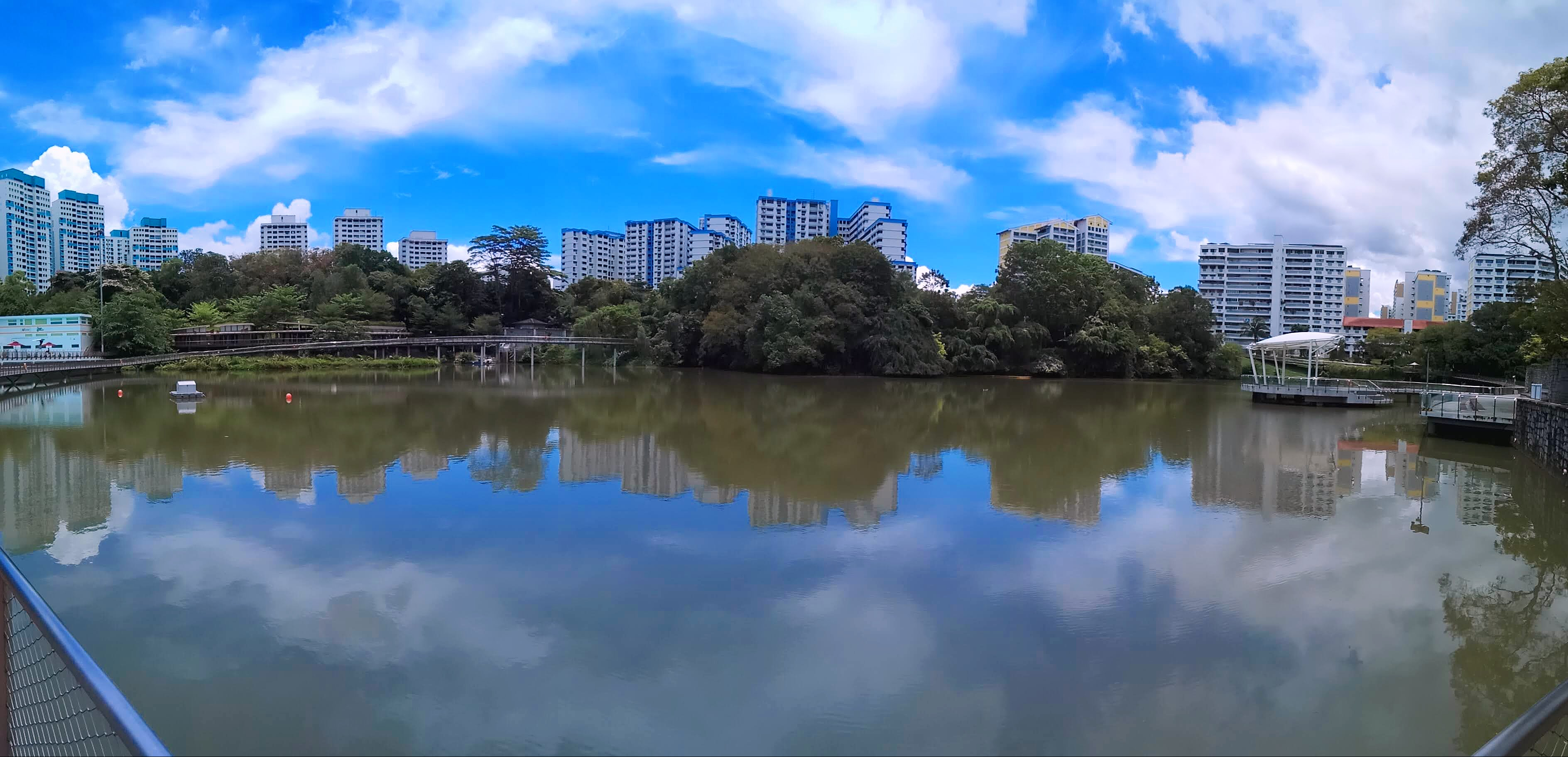
Pang Sua Pond, home to the second largest man-made floating wetland system in Singapore

The town has two major parks, namely Bukit Panjang Neighbourhood 5 Park and Zhenghua Park. Bukit Panjang Neighbourhood 5 Park is located adjacent to the Senja-Cashew Community Club and wraps around Pang Sua Pond, a man-made floating wetland. Zhenghua Park, located in the eastern part of Bukit Panjang, consists of a fitness area, gazebos, playgrounds, and a 2.5-kilometre cycling and jogging track that runs parallel to the Bukit Timah Expressway.

== Education ==
Bukit Panjang has both primary and secondary schools within the neighbourhood, as well as other private institutions.

=== Primary schools ===
- Beacon Primary School
- Bukit Panjang Primary School
- CHIJ Our Lady Queen of Peace
- Greenridge Primary School
- West Spring Primary School
- West View Primary School
- Zhenghua Primary School

=== Secondary schools ===
- Assumption English School
- Assumption Pathway School
- Greenridge Secondary School
- West Spring Secondary School
- Zhenghua Secondary School

=== Private institutions ===
- German European School Singapore
- St Francis Methodist School
- Trinity Theological College
- St Francis Xavier Major Seminary

== Transportation ==
=== Rail ===
Bukit Panjang is served by the following MRT stations on the Downtown Line, which opened on 27 December 2015, and provides residents with direct train access to the Downtown Core:

- DT1 – BP6 Bukit Panjang
- DT2 Cashew

It is also served by the following LRT stations on the Bukit Panjang LRT line, which connects it to nearby Choa Chu Kang for commuters to access the North–South Line:

- BP7 Petir
- BP8 Pending
- BP9 Bangkit
- BP10 Fajar
- BP11 Segar
- BP12 Jelapang
- BP13 Senja

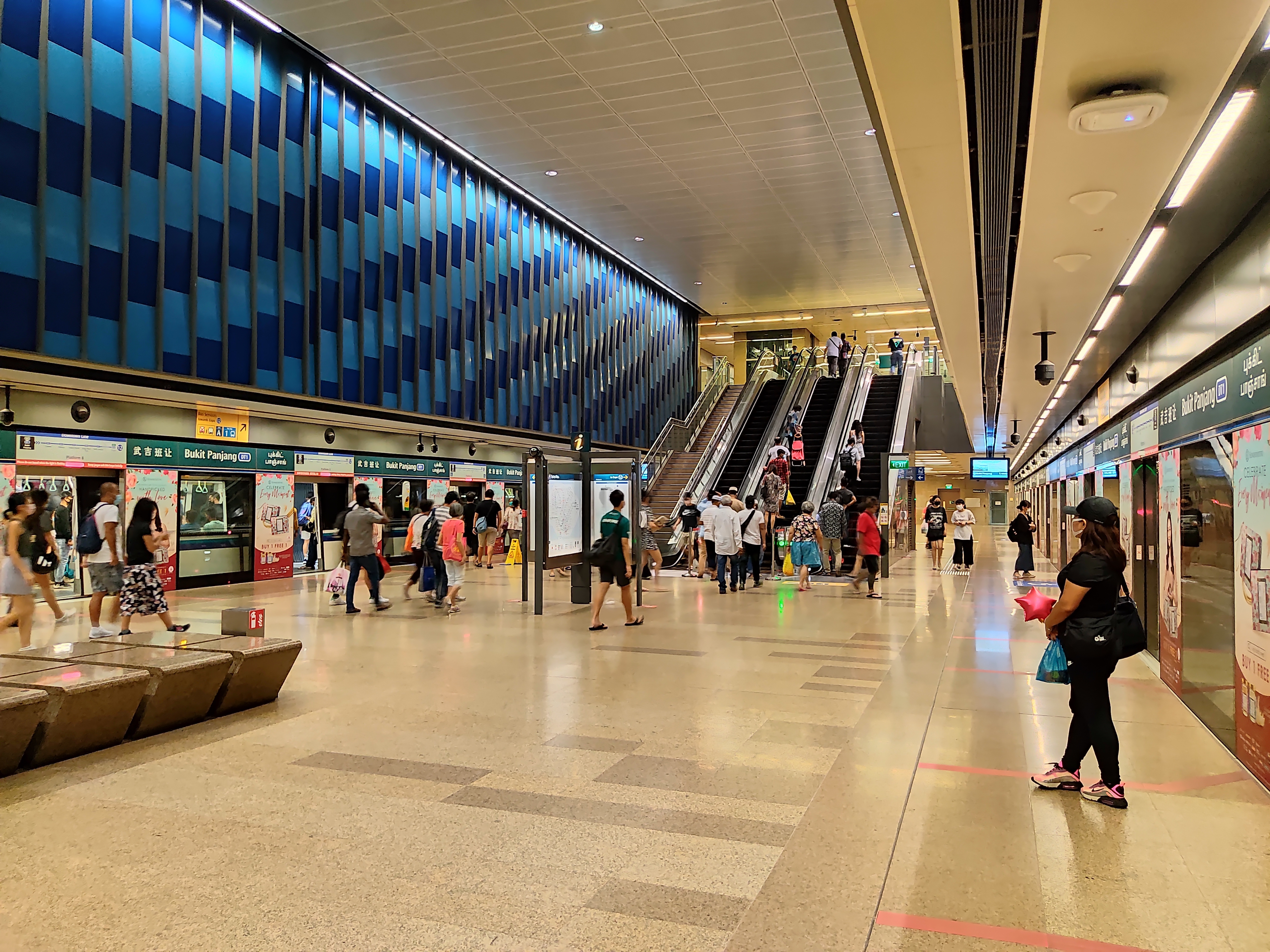
The interior of Bukit Panjang MRT station.

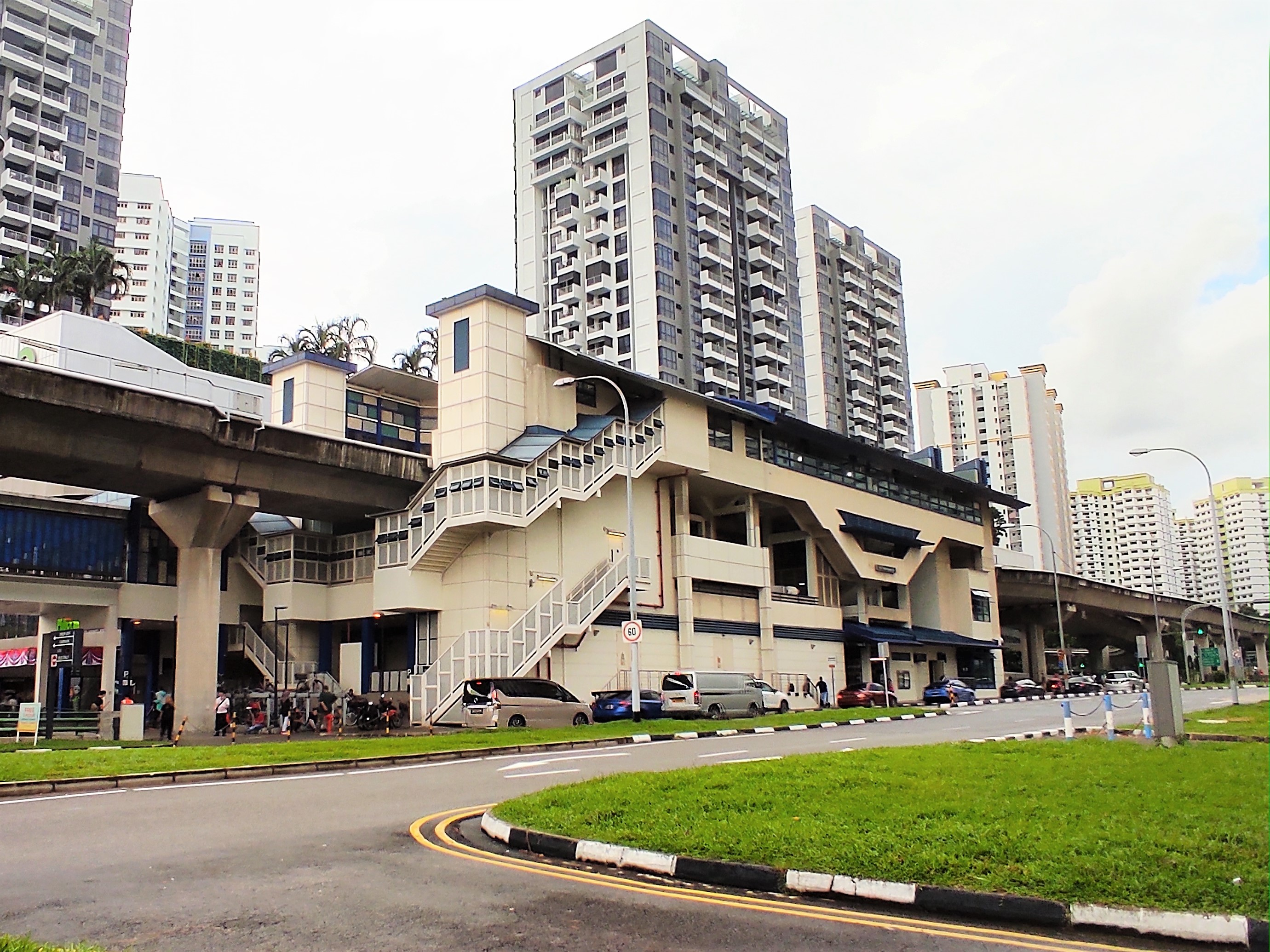
Bukit Panjang LRT station with a condominium and HDB flats in the background.

The driverless and fully automated Bukit Panjang LRT line was completed on 11 June 1999 at a cost of S$285 million. The rail line was intended to serve the growing town and act as a replacement to the many buses employed through the town, especially during rush hours. Originally opening with 14 stations, Ten Mile Junction station permanently closed on the 13th of January, 2019 after sighting low ridership, bringing the number to 13.

Several petitions were presented by the residents of Bukit Panjang protesting the decision by SMRT to replace the buses in Bukit Panjang with the LRT system. Some of the complaints were related to the fact that people preferred the previous bus system that covered most parts of the Bukit Panjang neighbourhoods such as bus service 190 and 972. The previous bus system was viewed as more efficient because it had many bus stops within walking distance; the LRT system has only 13 stations that are spaced hundreds of meters apart.

The LRT system is expected to go through a major upgrading programme that is due to be completed by 2026. The programme will bring about a new signalling system, better condition monitoring, new power rails system and 19 new light rail vehicles.

=== Bus ===
The public bus system is predominantly run by SMRT Buses. Of the SMRT buses based in Bukit Panjang, some are smaller feeder bus services that serve the various areas of the neighbourhood, while the rest are long-distance trunk services that serve as a mode of transport to other towns and to the city centre. Most bus services start and end at Bukit Panjang Bus Interchange.

Some buses loop around the bus interchange, using the bus stops along Upper Bukit Timah Road, above Bukit Panjang MRT as their looping point. This includes bus services 974 from Joo Koon Bus Interchange, 171 from Yishun Bus Interchange and 983 from Choa Chu Kang Bus Interchange. This is possibly due to the smaller Bukit Panjang Integrated Transport Hub compared to the previous bus interchange. The neighbouring Gali Batu Bus Terminal also houses and launches buses 75 and 184 that used to terminate at the bus interchange.

Other passing-through bus services include 67 and 190 from Choa Chu Kang Bus Interchange, 160 and 984 from Jurong Town Hall Bus Interchange, 170 from Queen Street Bus Terminal and 178 187 960 961 963 and 966 from Woodlands Integrated Transport Hub. Notably, buses 160 and 170 offer cross-border services to Johor Bahru, Malaysia and bus 178 provides a connection to Woodlands Train Checkpoint.

The town has numerous trunk buses that use expressways to access other towns or head towards the city. This includes services 187 963 966 to Woodlands via Bukit Timah Expressway (BKE) northbound, 171 to Yishun via BKE northbound and Mandai, 190 960 972 to city via BKE southbound.

=== Road ===
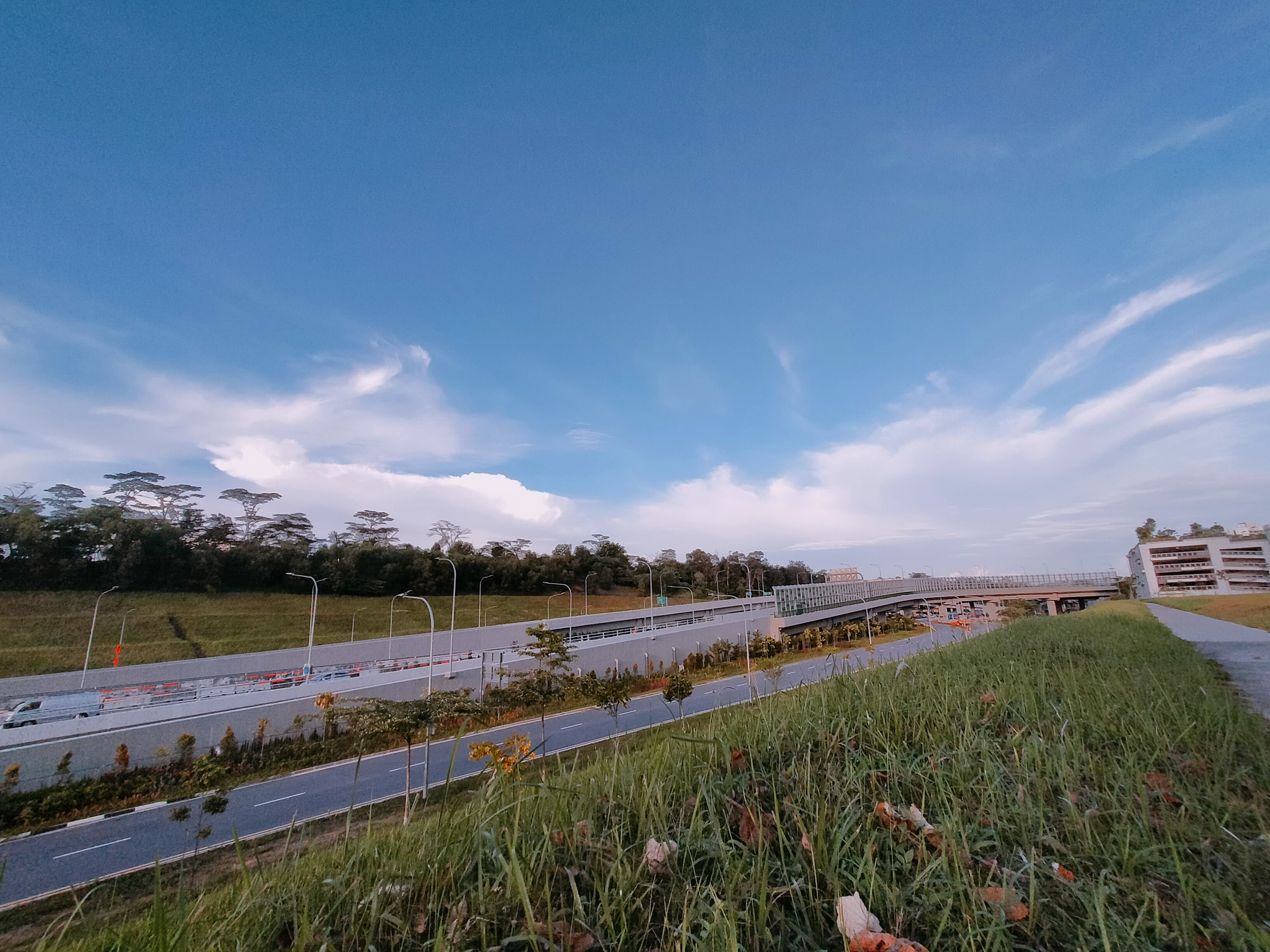
The Senja/KJE road interchange

Bukit Panjang is bounded by two of Singapore's expressways — the Bukit Timah Expressway (BKE) and Kranji Expressway (KJE). The BKE is accessible via Bukit Panjang Road and Dairy Farm Road, while the KJE is accessible via Woodlands Road and Senja Road.

Bukit Panjang also has a ring road running through the various parts of Bukit Panjang, the Bukit Panjang Ring Road. It acts as a feeder to the main arterial roads in the town.

=== Cycling ===
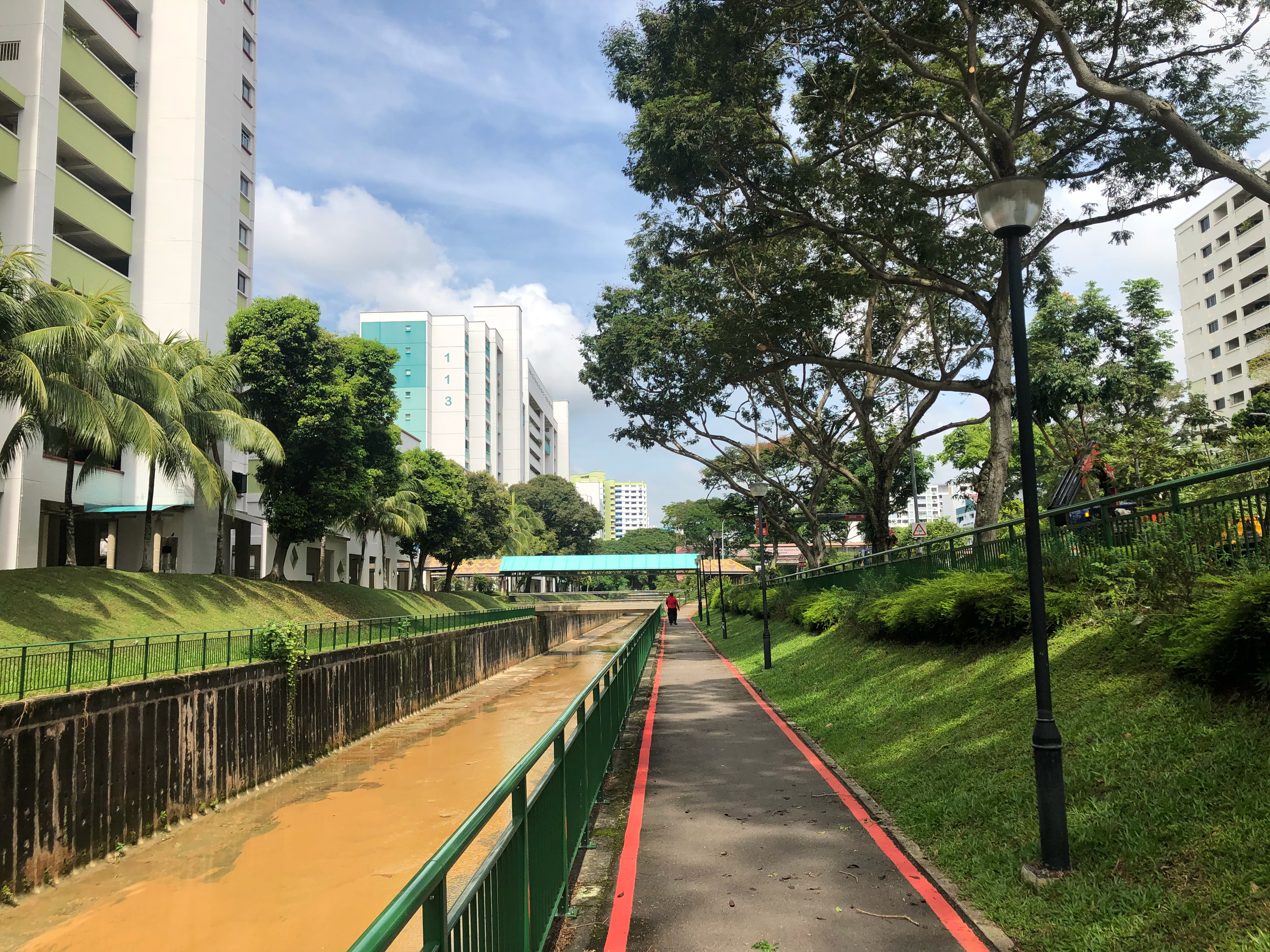
Pang Sua Park Connector running along a canal

There is a total of 8.5 km-worth of cycling paths around Bukit Panjang to facilitate active mobility as part of the Land Transport Authority's Walk-Cycle-Ride initiative. The first batch of cycling paths was constructed along Petir Road in 2018 by the Holland-Bukit Panjang Town Council. The network has since expanded to cover areas such as Fajar, Bangkit, Jelapang, and Senja. Together with the Pang Sua Park Connector, Bukit Panjang Park Connector, and Bukit Panjang (Woodlands Road to KJE) Park Connector, the cycling paths form the backbone of the town's 16 km cycling network.

== Politics ==
Bukit Panjang is politically divided into two constituencies, namely the Bukit Panjang Single Member Constituency and the Cashew and Zhenghua wards of the Holland-Bukit Timah Group Representation Constituency.

Bukit Panjang SMC mainly consists of the Pending, Bangkit and Fajar areas. Its Member of Parliament is Liang Eng Hwa.

Senja, Segar, and Jelapang are located in Zhenghua ward of Holland-Bukit Timah GRC where its Member of Parliament is Edward Chia. Petir, Gangsa, and Chestnut areas belong to the Cashew division of Holland-Bukit Timah GRC with its Member of Parliament being Vivian Balakrishnan.

=== Administration ===
The Bukit Panjang area comes under the administrative lead of the Holland-Bukit Panjang Town Council, which oversees the management and maintenance of the many apartments (HDB flats) and commercial units in Bukit Panjang. Its Member of Parliament is Liang Eng Hwa since the 2020 general election.
