= Zhenghua Secondary School =

- 正华中学; Sekolah Menengah Zhenghua செங்ஹூவா உயர்நிலைப்பள்ளி

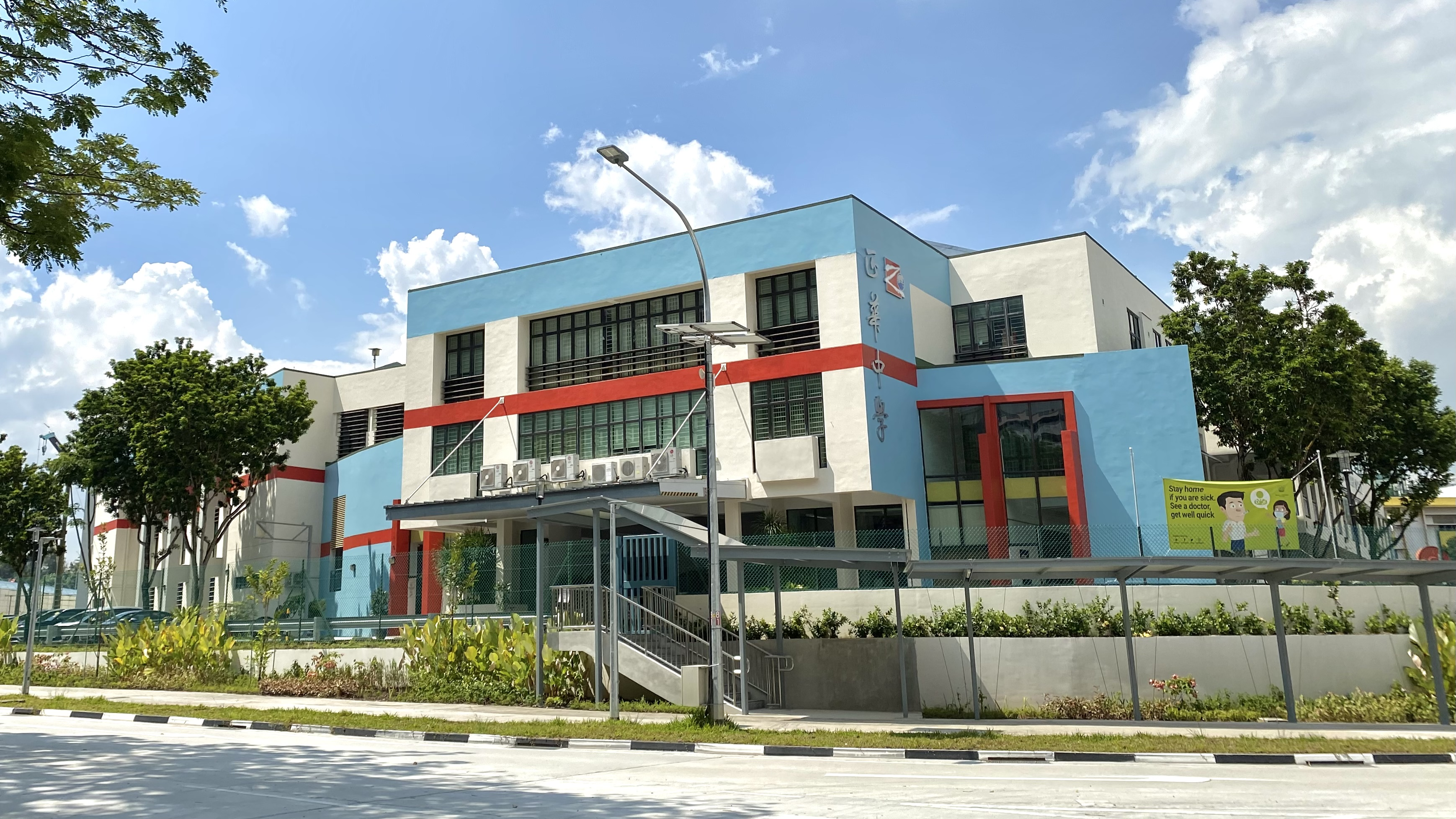

Location
- 62 Bukit Panjang Ring Road, Singapore 679962; Singapore; 1.3887°N 103.7652°E

Information
- Type: Government; Co-educational
- Motto: Engage and Create
- Established: 15 December 1999; 26 years ago
- Session: Single
- School code: 3617
- Principal: Ng Hock Soon
- Colour: Red Black
- Vision: Every student, a principled and future-ready leader
- Values: Respect, Resilience, Responsibility, Integrity, Compassion
- Website: zhenghuasec.moe.edu.sg

Zhenghua Secondary School (ZSS) is a co-educational government secondary school located in Bukit Panjang, Singapore. Established on 15 December 1999, the school offers secondary education leading to the Singapore-Cambridge GCE Ordinary Level examinations or the Singapore-Cambridge GCE Normal Level examinations.

== History ==
=== 1999 — 2002 ===
Zhenghua Secondary School's first principal was Cynthia Goh. She served as principal for three years from December 1999 to December 2002. It was under her guidance that the pioneer batch of head of departments and teachers crafted the school's logo, its motto, creed, the school's first set of ethos, and the first version of the school song titled "Riding on the Winds of Change".

Initially, Zhenghua Secondary School was temporarily housed in makeshift containers at Greenridge Secondary School. The school only moved to its own premises at 91 Senja Road in December 2000. In 2001, it was the school's turn to be hosts, sharing its campus with West Spring Secondary School for a year. It was during Goh's tenure that the school had its handover ceremony on 18 April 2001, and its official opening ceremony on 1 November 2002. The guest-of-honour was Gan Kim Yong, then-Member of Parliament for Holland–Bukit Panjang GRC. In December 2002, Goh retired from the education service.

=== 2003 — 2010 ===
Lim Kuan Min, former principal of Bishan Park Secondary School, took over as the second principal of Zhenghua Secondary School on 15 December 2002. He transformed the school under the mantra of "no discipline, no learning". Lim established outdoor education as a core part of the Zhenghua experience through the construction of the many outdoor elements that are currently still in use at the school. Lim retired from the education service in December 2010.

=== 2011 — 2014 ===
Fiona Tan was formerly the school's vice principal since 2010 before she became the third principal on 28 December of that same year. She strengthened the school's Character, Leadership and Citizenship programme, with the inclusion of the Moral Reasoning module. Tan expanded the Normal Curriculum experiential learning programme, which led the school to achieve the Lee Hsien Loong Innovations in Normal Curriculum award. Under her term as principal, the sabbatical programme started, allowing students to develop themselves in various aesthetics and sporting pursuits. Tan left the school at the end of 2014 after being posted to the Ministry of Education headquarters as a cluster superintendent.

=== 2015 — 2021 ===
Eugene Lin Yucheng was vice principal before he became the school's fourth principal on 30 December 2014. It was under his tenure when the school welcomed an addition to its campus, an indoor sports hall, in 2016. The revised version of the school song was also introduced during Lin's tenure.

In 2019, the school celebrated its 20th anniversary with a special edition of their arts festival named ZEST in July, which also featured a carnival that year. At the later part of that year, construction started for a new synthetic grass field with a running track, and a rebuilt podium and concrete parade square. The field was completed in 2020, while the new parade square was completed in 2021.

In 2021, the school started Full Subject-Based Banding. For the first time, the school organised classes that included secondary one students from all three courses, Express, Normal (Academic) and Normal (Technical). They will all take a set of subjects at a common level together and for other subjects, they will be grouped in classes according to the level at which they offer each subject. Full Subject-Based Banding will also allow secondary two students taking both Normal courses to take up Humanities subjects at a more demanding level. This helps better recognise each student's strengths and nurture their intrinsic motivation to learn.

In the same year, as part of the Personalised Digital Learning Programme, all students from secondary 1 to 3 purchased a Lenovo Chromebook for their personal learning device, which is integrated into the school's curriculum.

Lin was posted to Loyang View Secondary School in December 2021 as part of the Ministry of Education's rotational posting system, marking the end of his seven-year term at Zhenghua Secondary School.

=== 2022 — present ===
Ng Hock Soon, who was formerly the vice-principal of Queensway Secondary School, became the fifth principal of Zhenghua Secondary School on 3 December 2021.

In the 2nd half of 2022, Zhenghua Secondary School’s address was amended to better reflect the current placement of the school’s entrance. Formerly, the address was “91 Senja Road Singapore 677741”, with the current address being “62 Bukit Panjang Ring Road Singapore 679962”.

== Principals ==
=== Principals ===
No.	Principal name	Years served
1	Cynthia Goh Swee Tee	1999-2002
2	Lim Kuan Min	2002-2010
3	Fiona Tan	2010-2014
4	Eugene Lin Yucheng	2014-2021
5	Ng Hock Soon	2021–present

== Culture ==
=== School crest ===
The slashed, white 'Z' in Zhenghua Secondary School's crest represents water. This symbolises the continuous flow of knowledge and skills that is taught and learnt in the school, as well as the exuberance and vitality of youth. It breaks out of the frame to represent breaking out of a mindset and confines. The red in the crest represents the plasma of life, while the blue globe represents global opportunities.

=== Attire and appearance ===
Male students wear a red short-sleeved shirt with black long trousers, and white or black socks with black shoes. Female students wear a red tucked out short-sleeved blouse, a black skirt which must cover the knees, and white or black socks with black shoes. Students are also given the choice to wear a polo t-shirt. It is made out of a more comfortable material than the school uniform and looks visually similar.

Students are also allowed to be attired in half-uniform, which is a combination of the formal bottom and a tucked in PE t-shirt. It is only permitted after recess, after PE lessons, after curriculum hours and non-school days.

=== House system ===
Students are assigned a house based on their lower secondary class when the first join the school. The system is mainly used for sporting events within the school.

House name	House colour
Hawk	Red
Eagle	Black
Falcon	Yellow
Heron	Blue

=== Discipline ===
The school implemented a set of rules and regulations, covering areas such as the use of mobile phones and PLDs, attire and conduct. Discipline matters are usually handled by the school's discipline committee.

== Campus ==
The school's campus consists of 10 blocks. There are three three-storey blocks, six four-storey blocks, and a two-storey indoor sports hall block. The campus also features physical outdoor elements, a synthetic field, a parade square, and a Koi pond.

The campus is also handicapped-friendly, with the use of ramps that link all four-storeys of the school. There are also two lifts installed, one for the main campus and the other for the indoor sports hall.

== Academic information ==
Being a government secondary school, Zhenghua Secondary School offers three academic streams, namely the four-year Express course, as well as the Normal course, comprising Normal (Academic) and Normal (Technical) academic tracks.

=== O Level Express Course ===
The Express Course is a nationwide four-year programme that leads up to the Singapore-Cambridge GCE Ordinary Level examinations.

==== Academic subjects ====
The examinable academic subjects offered for Singapore-Cambridge GCE Ordinary Level offered by the school for upper secondary level are listed below.

Sciences	Language & Humanities	Arts & Aesthetics
Additional Mathematics; Mathematics; Physics; Chemistry; Biology; Science (Physics/Chemistry)/(Biology/Chemistry)	English Language; Mother Tongue Language; Higher Mother Tongue Language; Geography; Combined Humanities (SS/HY)/(SS/GY); Literature	Art; Design & Technology; Food & Nutrition

=== Normal Course ===
The Normal Course is a nationwide four-year programme leading to the Singapore-Cambridge GCE Normal Level examinations, which runs either the Normal (Academic) curriculum or Normal (Technical) curriculum, abbreviated as N(A) and N(T) respectively.

==== Normal (Academic) Course ====
In the Normal (Academic) course, students offer 5-8 subjects in the Singapore-Cambridge GCE Normal Level examinations. Compulsory subjects include:

- English Language
- Mother Tongue Language
- Mathematics
- Combined Humanities

A 5th year leading to the Singapore-Cambridge GCE Ordinary Level examination is available to N(A) students who perform well in their Singapore-Cambridge GCE Normal Level examination. Students can move from one course to another based on their performance and the assessment of the school principal and teachers.

==== Normal (Technical) Course ====
The Normal (Technical) course prepares students for a technical-vocational education at the Institute of Technical Education. Students will offer 5-7 subjects in the Singapore-Cambridge GCE Normal Level examination. The curriculum is tailored towards strengthening students’ proficiency in English and Mathematics. Students take English Language, Mathematics, Basic Mother Tongue and Computer Applications as compulsory subjects.

== Co-curricular activities (CCAs) ==
Zhenghua Secondary School offers a total of 20 co-curricular activities (CCAs). They are categorised into four main groups; Uniformed Groups, Clubs and Societies, Sports and Performing Arts.

Uniformed Groups	Clubs & Societies	Sports	Performing Arts
Scouts; NCC (Air); NPCC; Red Cross	Art Club; AVA Club; Infocomm; Library	Netball; Soccer; Volleyball; Sports Club; Basketball; Outdoor Activities Club (ODAC)	Band; Choir; Dance; Drums Ensemble; Handbells; Drama

== Gallery ==
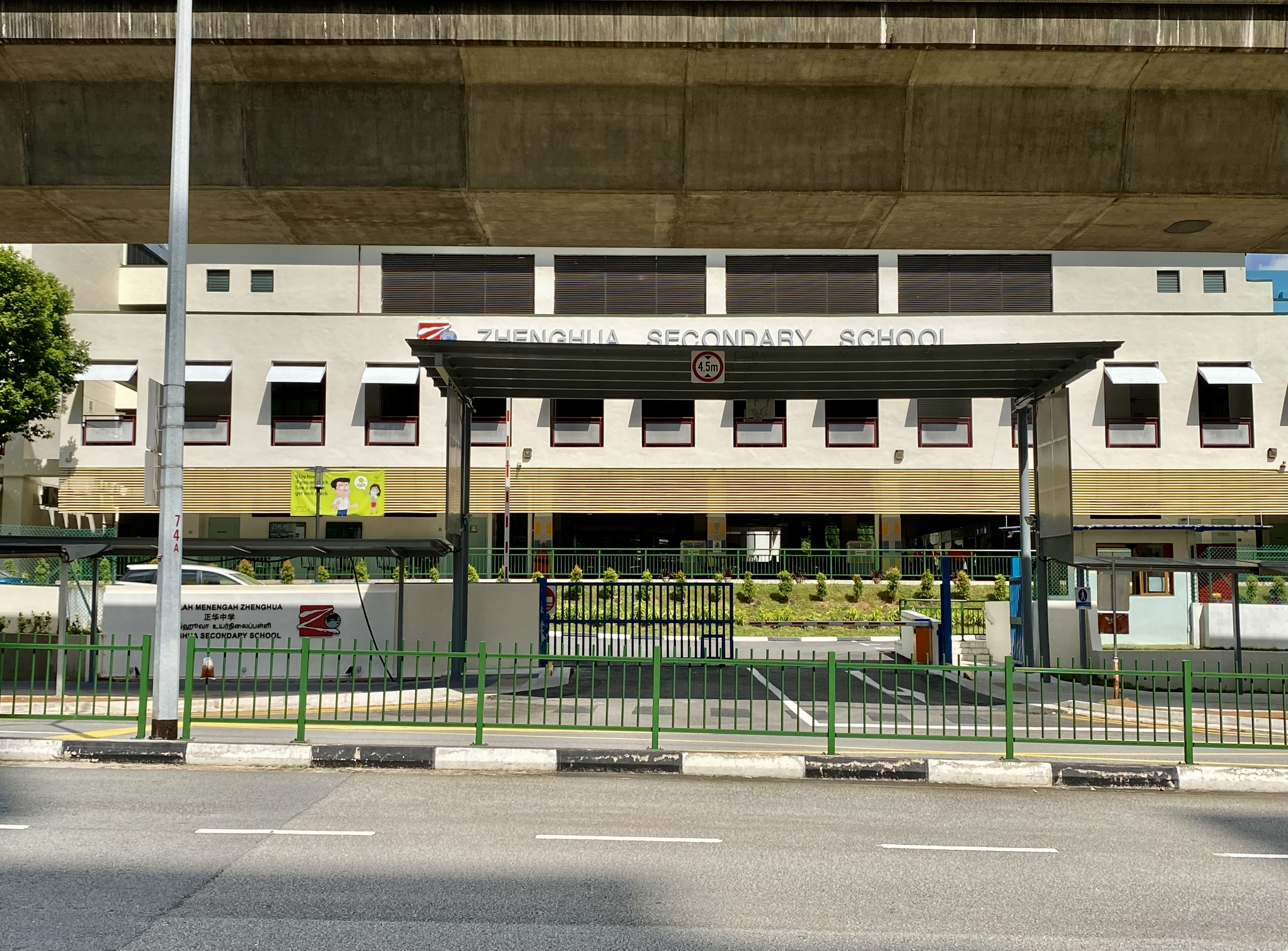
The school's main gate along Bukit Panjang Ring Road

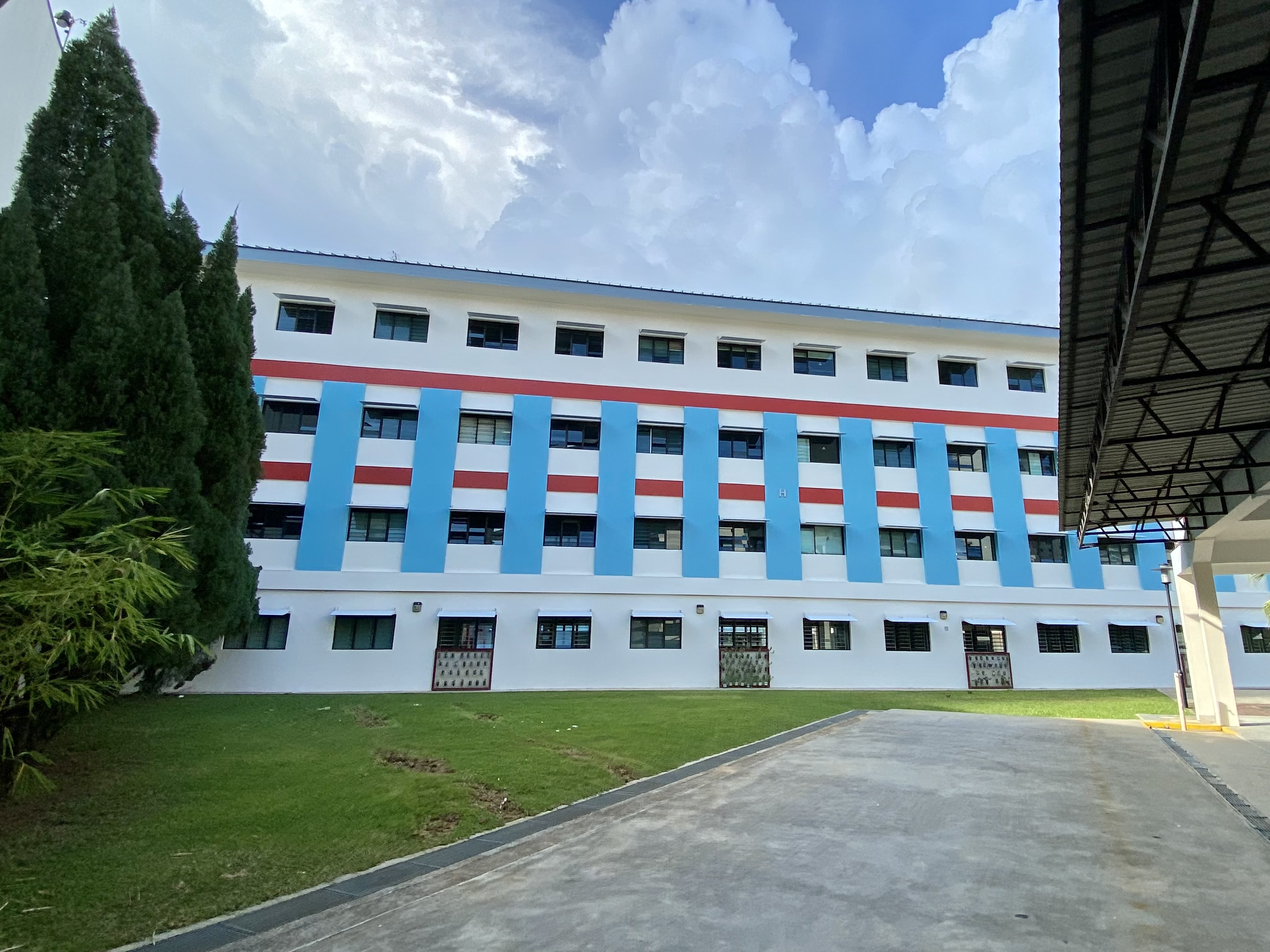
A typical classroom block

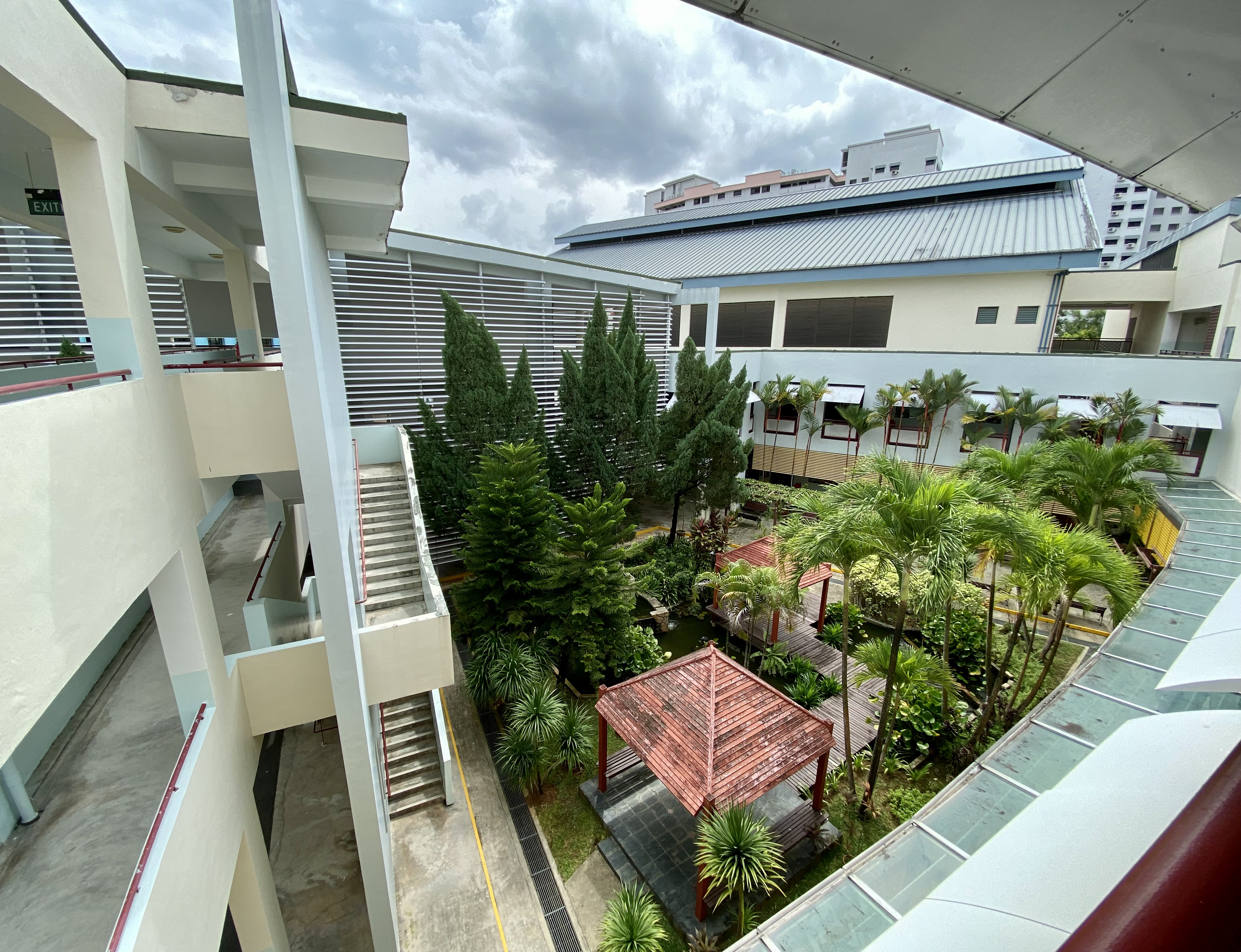
The school's koi pond

== Notable alumni ==
- Aliff Aziz, singer and actor
- Aisyah Aziz, singer
