= Bukit Timah Truss Bridge =

Former railway bridge in Singapore

Coordinates: 1°20′12″N 103°46′52″E

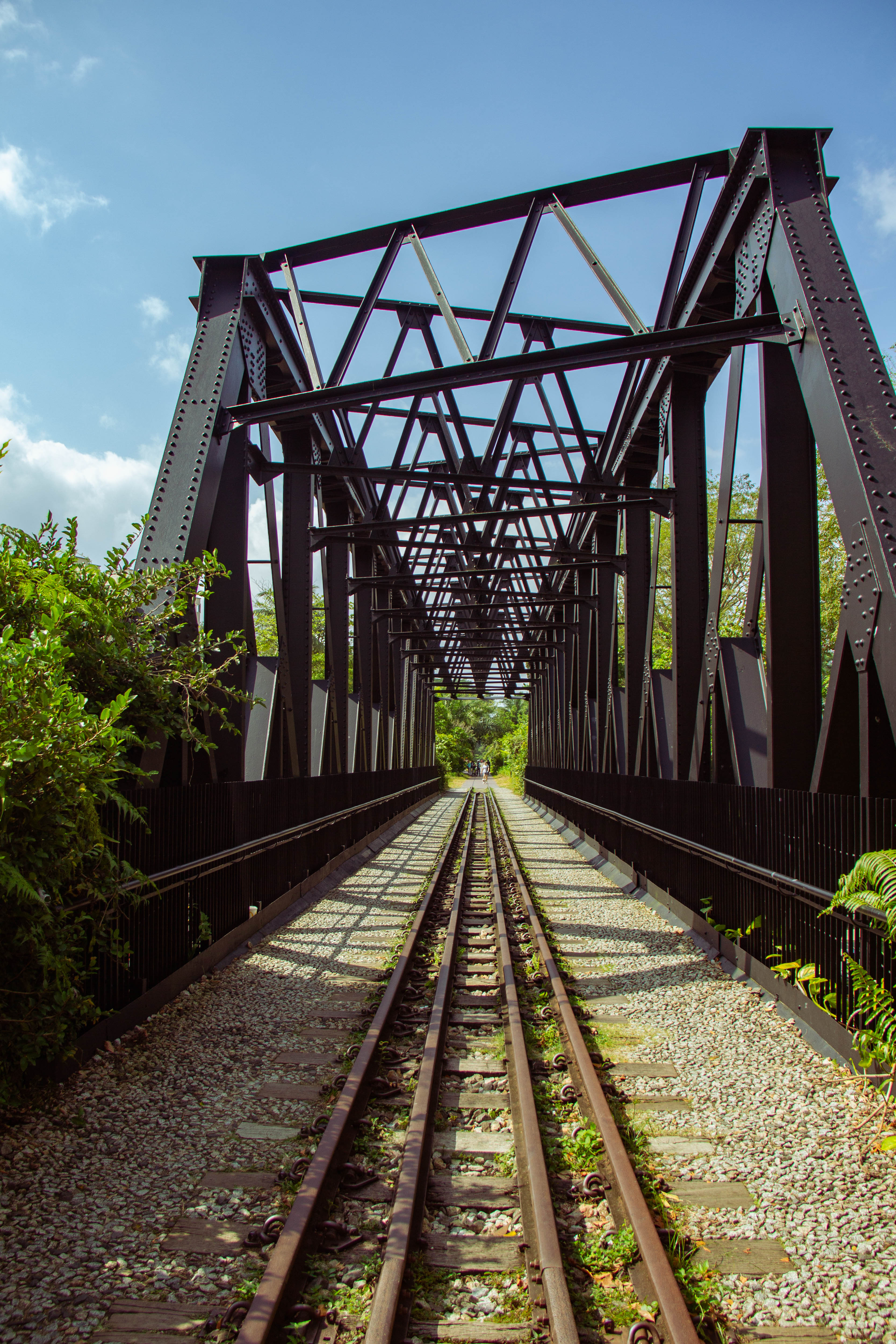
Bukit Timah Truss Bridge

The Bukit Timah Truss Bridge is a former railway bridge going over Bukit Timah Road and Dunearn Road in Bukit Timah, Singapore.

== History ==
Following the diversion of the Singapore Railway from Bukit Panjang railway station onwards, the Bukit Timah Truss Bridge was constructed at the seventh mile of Bukit Timah Road, just before Bukit Timah railway station, in 1932. By 1995, the bridge was not well-maintained, having become heavily rusted, with several bolts having already fallen off, despite the bridge's frequent usage. The bridge fell into disuse following the closure of the Singapore Railway in 2011 and was gazetted for conservation in late 2015 or early 2016.

In February 2021, decorations were hung up on the bridge for Chinese New Year. In March, railings were added to the bridge, ballast stones were added to either sides of the track, and rust was removed from the bridge. The bridge is now part of the Rail Corridor trail.
