= Bukit Panjang railway station =

Former railway station in Singapore

Bukit Panjang

General information
- Location: Singapore
- Coordinates: 1°22′44″N 103°45′37″E
- Platforms: 1

Other information
- Status: Demolished

History
- Opened: 10 April 1903; 123 years ago
- Closed: Unknown date
- Original company: Federated Malay States Railways

Former services
| Preceding station | Federated Malay States Railways | Following station |
|---|---|---|
| Kranji Terminus | Singapore–Kranji Railway (1932–1998) | Bukit Timah towards Tanjong Pagar |
| Mandai towards Woodlands | Singapore–Kranji Railway (1903–1932) | Bukit Timah towards Pasir Panjang |
Location

Bukit Panjang railway station was a railway station on the Singapore–Kranji Railway which served Bukit Panjang from 1903 to an unknown date. It briefly served as the line's northern terminus for 2 decades, from the closure of Woodlands and Mandai stations in the mid-1930s, to the opening of Kranji station, and possibly again after the closure of Kranji station until it ceased operation.

== History ==
Bukit Panjang railway station was opened to the public on 10 April 1903, located near the junction of Choa Chu Kang Road and Bukit Timah Road. It was situated between Bukit Timah and Woodlands stations. The station was built near the military exercise camp and range, and helped the surrounding neighbourhoods develop, as it attracted residents. The station was also near a rubber plantation. A post office was built at the station on 21 March 1924, and opened on 1 April 1924.

As it was decided that Tank Road station was unfit to be the terminus of the line, it was decided that the Bukit Timah-Tank Road section of the line would be abandoned, and the line would instead deviate in between Bukit Panjang station and Bukit Timah station, travelling down a different route which ran along the west of the main town, to a new terminal station at Tanjong Pagar, with a new station being built at Bukit Timah, and two new stations at Tanglin and Alexandra. In November 1955, a new service was introduced in which lorries would arrive at the station in the morning and in the evening to bring people to and fro from work from the station. This was introduced due to the low ridership of the station.

By 1984 the station had already been abandoned and demolished. The site was one of several possible locations for a railbus station for the railbus line that the Keretapi Tanah Melayu (KTM) planned to build in Singapore.

== Incidents ==
On 26 November 1921, a man was run over and killed by an oncoming train near the station. The body of the man was mutilated and very badly cut up.
