= Rail Corridor (Singapore) =

Heritage and nature trail in Singapore

Coordinates: 1°19′27″N 103°46′54″E

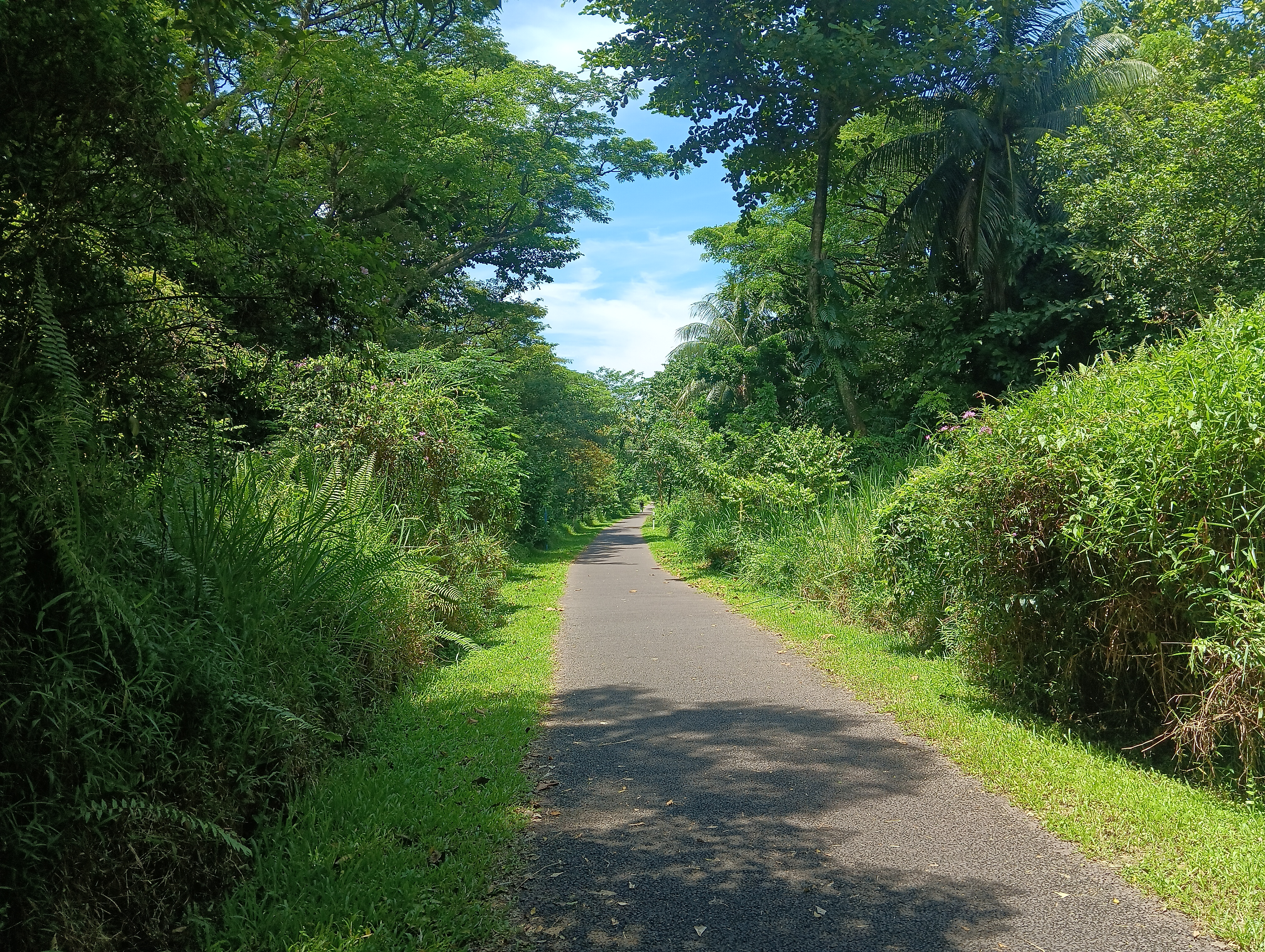
- A photo of the Rail Corridor, taken near Bukit Merah
- Length: 24 km (15 mi)
- Location: Singapore
- Began construction: 2018; 8 years ago
- Use: Hiking, cycling, walking
- Sights: Bukit Timah Truss Bridge; Bukit Timah railway station; Tanjong Pagar railway station (future; planned opening in 2026)
- Surface: Porous trail, grass and gravel, natural
- Maintainer: National Parks Board
- Website: NParks Rail Corridor

The Rail Corridor is a 24 kilometre-long greenway in Singapore created from sections of the former Singapore–Kranji Railway that once linked the island country to Peninsular Malaysia. After crossing the causeway, the railway ran south from Woodlands Train Checkpoint through Sungei Kadut before reaching Bukit Panjang and Bukit Timah, which includes the site of the former Bukit Timah railway station. From there it passed through Queenstown and ended at Bukit Merah, the location of the former Tanjong Pagar railway station.

Most of this route was converted into the Rail Corridor after the tracks were removed. Although much of the trail follows the original alignment of the former railway, a stretch has been realigned to facilitate the construction of new water facilities in Kranji. In addition, there are temporary diversions along the route which support ongoing restoration efforts aimed at conserving bridges, stations and other historic elements, as well as facilitating nearby construction projects, including new residential developments. Another branch of the trail following the path of the former Jurong railway line began construction in early 2025, and will open progressively from end-2026.

== Background ==
After Singapore gained its independence from Malaysia in 1965, operations and land used by the Singapore–Kranji Railway remained under the control of the Malaysian state-owned company Keretapi Tanah Melayu (KTM). Under the Singapore Railway Transfer Ordinance 1918, this strip of land consisted of 434.26 acres (175.74 ha) with 352.52 acres (142.66 ha) leased for a period of 999 years, while 81.74 acres (33.08 ha) was for perpetuity.

This strip of land extended approximately 27 kilometres (17 mi) from northern Singapore at Woodlands, passing through the central area near Bukit Timah railway station and down to Tanjong Pagar railway station in the south. Apart from the railway stations, it was generally narrow and consisted primarily of rail tracks and a few miscellaneous structures. In 2010, a land swap between Malaysia and Singapore enabled Singapore to reclaim this entire strip of land. That following year, a joint venture company named M+S Pte Ltd was established between Khazanah Nasional and Temasek Holdings to develop real estate in Singapore's city-centre worth $11 billion, which were Marina One and DUO.

== Development ==
=== Initial planning ===
Since the news of the swap was announced, the public had shown interest in the future developments of the now unused land. The Nature Society of Singapore (NSS) then submitted a proposal to the authorities to consider the land for a redevelopment in to a "green corridor". The proposal took inspirations from New York's High Line and Paris' Promenade Plantée. The public was receptive to the idea, and the Singapore government accepted the idea. The Urban Redevelopment Authority then held public engagement exercises, which culminated in a request for proposal in 2015. The winning proposal was further refined with public inputs collected in the earlier engagement exercises.

=== Redevelopment ===
In a joint statement issued on 21 October 2017, the Urban Redevelopment Authority and NParks announced that works to enhance the former railway land would begin the following year, with most of the Rail Corridor expected to be completed by 2021. Tanjong Pagar railway station, however, would only be completed in 2026 due to construction works for Cantonment MRT station located directly beneath the former railway station. Delayed from 2025 due to the COVID-19 pandemic.

Two truss bridges Bukit Timah Truss Bridge and Upper Bukit Timah Truss Bridge were conserved and reopened in 2020 and March 2021, respectively. The two bridges were built in 1932 for the railway route. Each sleeper, clip and spike of train tracks was put back in its exact position on the bridges after being removed for drainage works, with rotten timber sleepers replaced from other parts of the railway.

In March 2021, a 4 km stretch between the two conserved truss bridges, Bukit Timah Truss Bridge and Upper Bukit Timah Truss Bridge were opened after it was closed in 2019. Native plants were planted, and night lights that do not disturb wildlife at night were installed. Eight access points were added for residents, and drainage was improved to prevent waterlogging along the stretch. An underpass was built under the corridor at Hindhede Drive for pedestrians to access the Bukit Timah Nature Reserve without endangering themselves.

Community nodes along the Rail Corridor were developed in Kranji, under a PIE viaduct, at the former Bukit Timah Railway Station, and in Buona Vista.

=== Woodlands clearance ===
On 14 February 2021, 70 ha (170 acres) of Kranji woodlands next to the Rail Corridor was cleared by mistake. The ecological impact of the clearance on the Rail Corridor was unknown at the time of clearance. Subsequent investigations revealed that JTC Corporation had the permission from NParks to clear one plot of land, but instead three plots were being cleared. The clearance came under the inducement by two JTC officers who gave their superiors inaccurate information, and also the civil and structural consultants who agreed with the officers to a plan to fell the trees while making efforts to satisfy the wildlife protection related requirements instead of fulfilling the wildlife protection related requirements first per regulations then proceed with development of the land. The enacted plan was due to the impact of COVID-19 pandemic in Singapore affecting the development timeline of the construction project.

Later studies showed that the cleared land consisted of scrubland vegetation with non-native trees being grown and was not near any sensitive nature areas. Earlier, nature experts stated that the cleared land was of strategic importance for animals to reach the Rail Corridor.

=== Future plans ===
The former Bukit Timah Fire Station was redeveloped in 2024 and reopened in 2025. Two locations along the Rail Corridor, at Queensway and Stagmont Ring would be developed into community spaces and be completed in 2027 and 2035, respectively. There will also be a housing site Rail Garden @ CCK and Rail Green I & II @ CCK in between of Bukit Panjang and Choa Chu Kang integrated with the Rail Corridor scheduled to be completed in 2028.

== See also ==
- Park Connector Network (PCN)
