= Maju Forest =

Forest in Clementi, Singapore

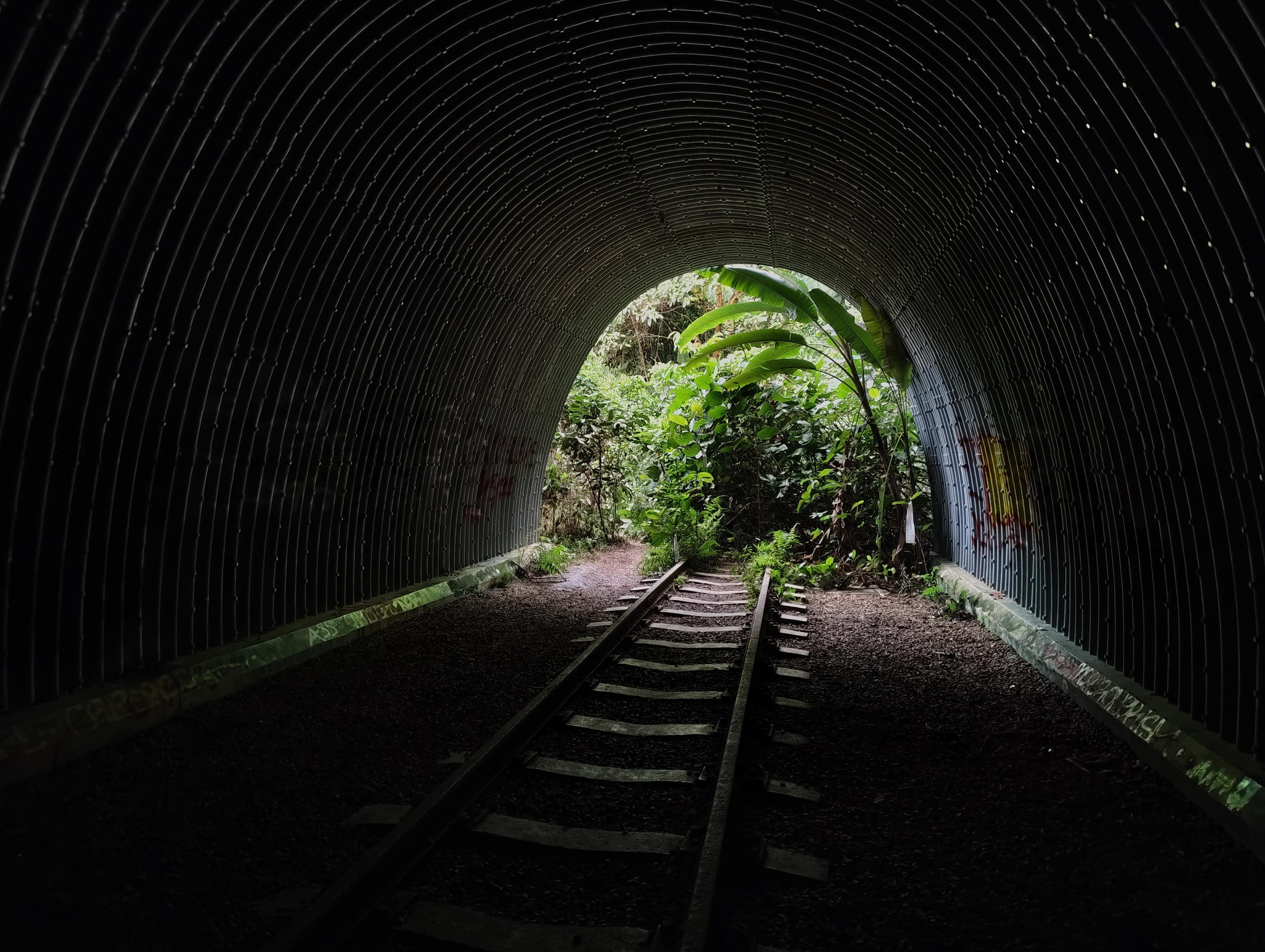
- Remnant of the KTM Jurong Line in Maju Forest
- Interactive map of Maju Forest

Geography
- Location: Sunset Way, Clementi, Singapore
- Coordinates: 1.3264°N 103.7717°E
- Elevation: 57m
- Area: 23 ha (57 acres)

Administration
- Authority: National Parks Board

Ecology
- Ecosystem: Peninsular Malaysian rain forests
- WWF Classification: Tropical and subtropical moist broadleaf forests

Maju Forest is a regenerating secondary forest located in Clementi, Singapore.

== Etymology ==
The term maju means "to move forward" in Malay.

== History ==
Records suggest that the area of the modern forest was a plantation in 1914, but was predominantly covered by grassland by 1950. The forest and the neighbouring Clementi Forest were later affected by the development and operations of the Keretapi Tanah Melayu (KTM) railway in the 1960s. In 1963, the Jurong Line was incorporated into the railway. It began at Clementi Forest and cut through the valley in the southern section of Maju Forest. Between 1975 and 2005, both forests matured into abandoned-land forest; railway operations ceased in the 1990s.

=== Redevelopment controversy ===
On 10 July 2026, the Housing and Development Board (HDB) announced that it would build new homes in Maju Forest and Gillman Barracks. Following the announcement, over 41,000 people signed a petition against the plans.

On 4 August 2026, Alvin Tan, the Minister of State for National Development, stated that the plans were not fixed.

== Natural history ==
=== Ecology ===
Maju Forest is home to over 100 species of wildlife, including 6 species of conservation significance, including the straw-headed bulbul, buffy fish-owl, changeable hawk-eagle, oriental magpie-robin, bamboo bat and long-tailed macaque.
