= Malaysia–Singapore Points of Agreement of 1990 =

Agreement regarding KTM railway land in Singapore

Malaysia–Singapore Points of Agreement of 1990 (POA) is an agreement between the Southeast Asian countries of Malaysia and Singapore over the issue of the future of the railway land along the Singapore–Kranji Railway in Singapore, which was owned by the Malaysian government through Keretapi Tanah Melayu (KTM). It was signed by then Prime Minister of Singapore Lee Kuan Yew and then Finance Minister of Malaysia Tun Daim Zanuddin on behalf of their respective countries on 27 November 1990.

The implementation of the agreement was deadlocked for many years because of disputes over its interpretation. However, on 24 May 2010, Malaysian prime minister Najib Razak and his Singaporean counterpart Lee Hsien Loong, after a leaders' retreat in Singapore, announced that the two sides had reached an agreement on outstanding issues concerning the 1990 POA, thus breaking the 20-year-old deadlock.

== The agreement ==
Under the agreement, KTM would vacate its station at Tanjong Pagar and move to Bukit Timah, while all KTM's land between Bukit Timah and Tanjong Pagar would revert to Singapore. Railway land at Tanjong Pagar would be handed over to a private limited company for joint development of which its equity would be split 60% to Malaysia and 40% to Singapore.

The agreement, however, became one of the major reasons for the less-than-warm relationship between Malaysia and Singapore. The key contention was the difference in interpretation of the agreement by the two countries, resulting in its implementation being deadlocked for many years.

Singapore insisted that the agreement came into effect immediately after it was signed by both parties. It was not until 1 July 2011 that the Singapore–Kranji Railway ceased operation, destroying the electrification plans and double-tracking plans, along with the new depot at Gali Batu.

== The dispute ==
=== Malayan Railway land in Singapore ===
The Malayan Railway land, covering over 217 hectares and stretching 20–30 kilometres into Singapore territory, was acquired through a lease under Railway Act 1918 specifically for use by Federated Malay States Railways (FMSR, which later became KTM) for a period of 999 years. That same ordinance limits the use of the land to railway operations, thus preventing the land from being developed despite being situated on prime land.

Under a bilateral arrangement on 27 November 1990 known as the Points of Agreement (POA), Malaysia and Singapore decided to depart from the Railways Act 1918 to facilitate joint redevelopment of the Tanjong Pagar Railway Station and the lands adjacent to the railway line.

Under the ordinance, Malaysia was allowed to operate a customs, immigration and quarantine checkpoint at Tanjong Pagar railway station, together with the Singapore CIQ to facilitate convenient checkpoint procedures for passengers. Passengers to Malaysia would go through immigration checks prior to boarding the train, allowing trains to run uninterrupted from Singapore to destinations in Malaysia. Passengers arriving in Singapore would only go through immigration procedures for Malaysia and Singapore after arriving at Tanjong Pagar.

=== Deadlock ===
The 1990 POA states that the Tanjong Pagar railway station would be moved either to Bukit Timah first, or directly to Kranji. In exchange three parcels of railway land—at Tanjong Pagar, Kranji, and Woodlands—would be jointly developed on a 60–40 basis with the Malaysian government holding the larger share. However, three years later, Prime Minister Mahathir expressed his displeasure with the POA as it failed to include a piece of railway land in Bukit Timah for joint development.

Malaysia's subsequent reluctance to go ahead with the 1990 agreement was based on the fear that it might eventually be forced to give up proprietary control over some or all of KTM's land in Singapore.

=== Checkpoint relocation ===
This issue has invariably become linked to Malaysia's CIQ checkpoint at Tanjong Pagar.

In 1993, both countries had agreed to move their CIQ facilities in Tanjong Pagar to the Woodlands Train Checkpoint at the northernmost point of the island by 1 August 1998. The agreement was reached outside the context of the 1990 POA. KTM had also worked with Singapore on re-aligning its railway tracks at Woodlands when Singapore built a new immigration checkpoint there to replace the old checkpoint, and with new facilities to carry out train passengers' immigration clearance at the point of entry into Singapore rather than at Tanjong Pagar.

However, in June 1997, while stating that the 1990 POA would come into effect only after it decided to relocate Tanjong Pagar station, Malaysia also informed Singapore that it had changed its mind on the relocation of the CIQ and decided not to co-locate its CIQ with Singapore's at Woodlands Train Checkpoint (WTCP) but to remain at Tanjong Pagar.

In April 1998, Singapore informed Malaysia that it would be moving its CIQ operations to Woodlands while Malaysia would have to move its CIQ out of Singapore from 1 August 1998. Malaysia requested, instead, that space be made available at the WTCP, as an interim arrangement, for Malaysian immigration officials to operate from there and thereby overcome the problem of sequence of exit and entry stampings by Singapore and Malaysia immigration authorities.

According to a press release from the Ministry of Home Affairs of Singapore dated 24 July 1998:

- Singapore will allow Malaysian customs officials to operate at Tanjong Pagar railway station. Singapore officials will be present at Tanjong Pagar railway station to lend their authority to Malaysian customs officials during the interim period.
- Singapore has agreed to Malaysia's request to allow Malaysian Immigration to put some desks for its immigration officers on the passenger platform at WTCP to clear passengers after Singapore has cleared them for exit from Singapore. Singapore Immigration must clear departing passengers for exit from Singapore before Malaysian Immigration clears them for entry into Malaysia. Otherwise, the sequence of immigration clearance will be illogical and it will cause problems in crime investigation and prosecution. These interim arrangements will overcome the problems which would be caused if Malaysian Immigration were to remain in Tanjong Pagar railway station.

However, Malaysia refused to have its immigration clearance on the passenger platform. It insisted that Malaysian Immigration should be inside the building at WTCP. If this was not possible, they said that Malaysian Immigration would remain at Tanjong Pagar.

Singapore argued that Malaysia's decision to locate its Immigration Control Post in Singapore is not in compliance with Malaysia's own law. Under Malaysian law, it is Johor Bahru railway station, not Tanjong Pagar, that is gazetted as an Immigration Control Post for persons travelling by train from Singapore to Malaysia. Singapore also pointed out that this was confirmed by the endorsement on the passports of passengers boarding the train at Tanjong Pagar, which showed:

MALAYSIA IMMIGRATION
JOHOR BAHRU
SOCIAL/BUSINESS VISIT PASS
Reg. 11. Imm. Regs 63
[Date]"
Permitted to enter and remain in West Malaysia and Sabah for one month from the date shown above

Singapore also maintained that using international conventions and legal practice, any exercise of sovereign rights by Malaysia on Singapore's territory, such as the stamping of passports, can only be done with the sufferance of the Government of Singapore. Since both parties had agreed to move the CIQ facilities to Woodlands, it was improper of Malaysia to detract from this agreement and continue to operate from Tanjong Pagar without the consent of the Singapore government.

Singapore argued that the two issues were separate: ownership of KTM land as opposed to exercising sovereign rights by another state on Singapore's sovereign territory. Singapore Foreign Minister Professor S Jayakumar informed the Singapore Parliament on 31 July 1998 that in a 17 July meeting between officials of both sides, the Malaysian delegation fully understood that the CIQ and POA were separate issues, and hence there was no question of Singapore taking back KTM land merely by relocating its CIQ to Woodlands.

On 1 August 1998, Singaporean Immigration ceased operations in Tanjong Pagar and moved to WTCP while Malaysian Immigration continued operating in Tanjong Pagar. Malaysia decided not to endorse the passports of outgoing rail passengers from Singapore and promised to provide legal arguments to show that Malaysia's CIQ has the legal right to stay at Tanjong Pagar.

The immigration clearance procedure which resulted from the impasse was:

- Towards Singapore, Malaysian immigration officers carry out immigration clearance on board the train at Johor Bahru railway station. After clearing immigration, the train crosses the causeway and stops at WTCP, where all passengers must proceed to Singapore Customs and Immigration. Therefore, travellers entering Singapore by rail are following the correct order of immigration clearance, that is, exit granted by Malaysian Immigration in Johor and entry granted by Singapore Immigration in Woodlands. After clearing immigration at Woodlands, passengers may disembark or continue their journey to Tanjong Pagar by train.
- Towards Malaysia, passengers must board the train at Tanjong Pagar and clear Malaysian Customs and Immigration before boarding. The train travels about 30 minutes to WTCP and stops for another 30 minutes to allow sufficient time for passengers to clear Singapore Immigration. In this case, passengers are granted entry into Malaysia before clearing Singapore Immigration, which is contrary to international practice. To circumvent this problem, Malaysian immigration officers do not stamp on passengers' passports.

=== Thawing of relations ===
An agreement in September 2001 nevertheless helped resolve this thorny issue which provided sufficient latitude to be exploited for political purposes in times of economic or political difficulties. Both governments have reached an understanding on the Malaysian immigration checkpoint on the Kuala Lumpur-Singapore railway line, which is to be moved from Tanjong Pagar to Kranji. The issue over Malayan Railway land—a very sensitive one for Kuala Lumpur—was then thought to be resolved by Singapore's agreement to offer Malaysia another twelve plots of land in Bukit Timah (as mentioned earlier). This would link concessions on land with those on water.

Little was heard subsequently until May 2009 when it was reported that both countries were seeking a timely resolution to the long-standing issue.

The Land Transport Authority has announced the construction of Downtown Line Stage 2 on 21 July 2008 of which it duplicates the KTM line from Bukit Panjang to Bukit Timah.

== Agreement reached ==
=== Points of Agreement Supplement ===
On 24 May 2010, Malaysian prime minister Najib Razak and his Singaporean counterpart Lee Hsien Loong, after a leaders' retreat in Singapore, announced that the two sides had reached an agreement on outstanding issues concerning the 1990 POA, thus breaking the 20-year-old deadlock.

Calling it a "supplement" to the 1990 POA, the two governments permanently closed down Tanjong Pagar railway station, and Bukit Timah railway station on 1 July 2011. Bus services 160, 170, 950, AC7, CW1, CW2 and CW5 will be beefed up together with several links to Woodlands from Woodlands Checkpoint railway station. In addition, the old Bukit Timah railway station will be conserved and Tanjong Pagar railway station will be preserved as a national monument. The older tracks has been permanently demolished except for conserved and preserved areas.

Khazanah Nasional and Temasek Holdings (M+S Pte Ltd) had been established to develop a parcel at Marina Bay (Marina One) which has been tendered out since 19 December 2009, and Bugis (Duo Residences) which has also been tendered out since 10 January 2010.

=== Land swap ===
On 22 June 2010, Lee Hsien Loong visited Malaysia to discuss the land swap issue with Najib Razak. Following the same meeting, Lee Hsien Loong sent a revised land swap offer to Najib Razak on 28 June 2010. Najib Razak accepted the offer on 17 September 2010 and Lee Hsien Loong replied on 19 September 2010 confirming his agreement.

On 20 September 2010 during a visit by Najib Razak to Singapore, he and Lee Hsien Loong issued a joint statement which stated that both Leaders have agreed to the following:

- The Singapore Government shall vest four land parcels in Marina South (TS30-361T, TS30-362A, TS30-363K and TS30-364N) and two land parcels in Ophir-Rochor (TS13-1115N and TS13-1116X) in M-S Pte Ltd, in lieu of the three parcels of POA land in Tanjong Pagar, Kranji and Woodlands and the three pieces of land in Bukit Timah. The four Marina South parcels are located at the heart of the financial and business cluster in Singapore's Marina Bay, while the two Ophir-Rochor parcels are located next to the Kampong Glam Historic District, in a new growth corridor that is being developed as an extension of Singapore's Central Business District.
- The Marina South and Ophir-Rochor land parcels shall be vested in M-S Pte Ltd for joint development when Keretapi Tanah Melayu Berhad (KTMB) vacates the Tanjong Pagar Railway Station. The station will be relocated from Tanjong Pagar to the Woodlands Train Checkpoint (WTCP) by 1 July 2011 whereby Malaysia would co-locate its railway Custom, Immigration and Quarantine facilities at WTCP.
- The Joint Implementation Team shall conclude by 31 December 2010 their discussion on the details of the implementation of the POA.

=== Disagreement over development charges ===
The two countries however could not come to an agreement over the payment of development charges to be levied by the Singapore government for the POA land in Tanjong Pagar, Kranji and Woodlands. Development charge is a tax on the enhancement in land value resulting from the approval of a higher value development proposal. Malaysia believes the POA renders the charge inapplicable to these three parcels, but agreed to the tax for the Bukit Timah parcels which were not covered in the POA. Singapore on the other hand believes it still applies and must be considered to determine a land swap of equivalent value.

Both leaders have agreed to bring the matter for arbitration at the Permanent Court of Arbitration. They further agreed to accept the arbitration award as final and binding. The arbitration will proceed on its own track and shall not affect the implementation of the POA and the other bilateral initiatives agreed in the Joint Statement of 24 May 2010.

On 31 October 2014, The Permanent Court of Arbitration ruled in favour of Malaysia that the development charges for the three parcels need not to be paid.
