= Tanglin railway station =

Former railway station in Singapore

Tanglin

General information
- Location: Singapore
- Coordinates: 1°18′18.328″N 103°47′34.094″E
- Platforms: 1

Other information
- Status: Demolished

History
- Opened: 3 May 1932; 94 years ago
- Closed: Middle to late 20th century
- Original company: Keretapi Tanah Melayu

Former services
Preceding station	Federated Malay States Railways	Following station
Bukit Timah towards Kranji	Singapore–Kranji Railway (1932–1998)	Alexandra Halt towards Tanjong Pagar
Location

Tanglin railway station, also known as Tanglin Halt, was a railway station on the Singapore–Kranji Railway. It was opened in 1932 and operated until at least 1961.

== History ==
Due to a myriad of issues arising from the old alignment of the railway, including the inadequate terminus at Tank Road, the section of the railway between Bukit Panjang and Tank Road was to be abandoned, and would be replaced by a new railway running to Tanjong Pagar. Tanglin railway station was opened as a new intermediate stop on 3 May 1932, along with Alexandra Halt and a new station at Bukit Timah. Located near what was then Buona Vista Road, the station was small, with not many amenities, such as automatic machines, that were common in other smaller stations.

After the closure of Alexandra Halt on 20 March 1934, Tanglin station became the new halt. In November 1955, due to the low ridership of the station, a new lorry service was introduced to act as a last-mile connection between the railway station and people's workplaces.

From 1966 or possibly earlier to at least 1987, Tanglin Halt station served a freight branch line to Ayer Rajah Industrial Estate. By then, the station had no longer operate passenger service.

In 1984, Tanglin Halt station was proposed as a stop for a new railbus service between Tanjong Pagar and Johor Bahru.

== Incidents ==
On 14 May 1951, forty-year-old Ng Ang Bee, the mother of ten-year-old Ng Ang Lek, was knocked down and killed by an oncoming train near the station. Ang Bee left her home in Buona Vista to call her daughter, who had been playing on the other side of the tracks, back home. Ang Bee then approached her daughter by stepping onto the railway tracks just as a train had arrived, flinging her over twenty yards. Her death was witnessed by Ang Lek. A verdict of death due to misadventure was returned.

On 20 October 1956, a woman, Chong Yit Moh, attempted to cross the railway tracks at the station and was knocked down by an oncoming train. She was admitted to the hospital in a serious condition.

== Legacy ==
Built in the 1960s, the Tanglin Halt neighbourhood and former industrial estate was named after the station.
