= Alexandra Halt railway station =

Former railway halt in Singapore

Alexandra Halt

General information
- Location: Singapore
- Coordinates: 1°17′4.52″N 103°48′2.93″E
- Platforms: 1

Other information
- Status: Demolished

History
- Opened: May 3, 1932; 94 years ago
- Closed: March 20, 1934; 92 years ago

Former services
Preceding station	Federated Malay States Railways	Following station
Tanglin towards Kranji	Singapore–Kranji Railway (1932–1998)	Tanjong Pagar Terminus
Location

Alexandra Halt railway station, or simply Alexandra Halt, was a railway station on the Singapore–Kranji Railway. It opened on 3 May 1932 and closed on 20 March 1934.

== History ==
Due to a myriad of issues arising from the old alignment of the railway, including the inadequate terminus at Tank Road, the section of the railway between Bukit Panjang and Tank Road was to be abandoned, and would be replaced by a new railway running to Tanjong Pagar.

Alexandra Halt was opened as a new intermediate stop on 3 May 1932, along with Tanglin and a new station at Bukit Timah. Located near Alexandra Road, the station served the former Alexandra Barracks, at present-day Alexandra Park Colonial Estate. The station was also about a mile away from the old Pasir Panjang railway station.

On 17 January 1933, an old Chinese woman suffered a skull fracture after an accident with a railway engine at Alexandrs Halt.

The station closed on 20 March 1934. Tanglin station then replaced it as the railway's new halt.
