= Woodlands Train Checkpoint =

Railway station and border checkpoint in Singapore for trains to Malaysia

Coordinates: 1°26′38″N 103°46′09″E

Woodlands

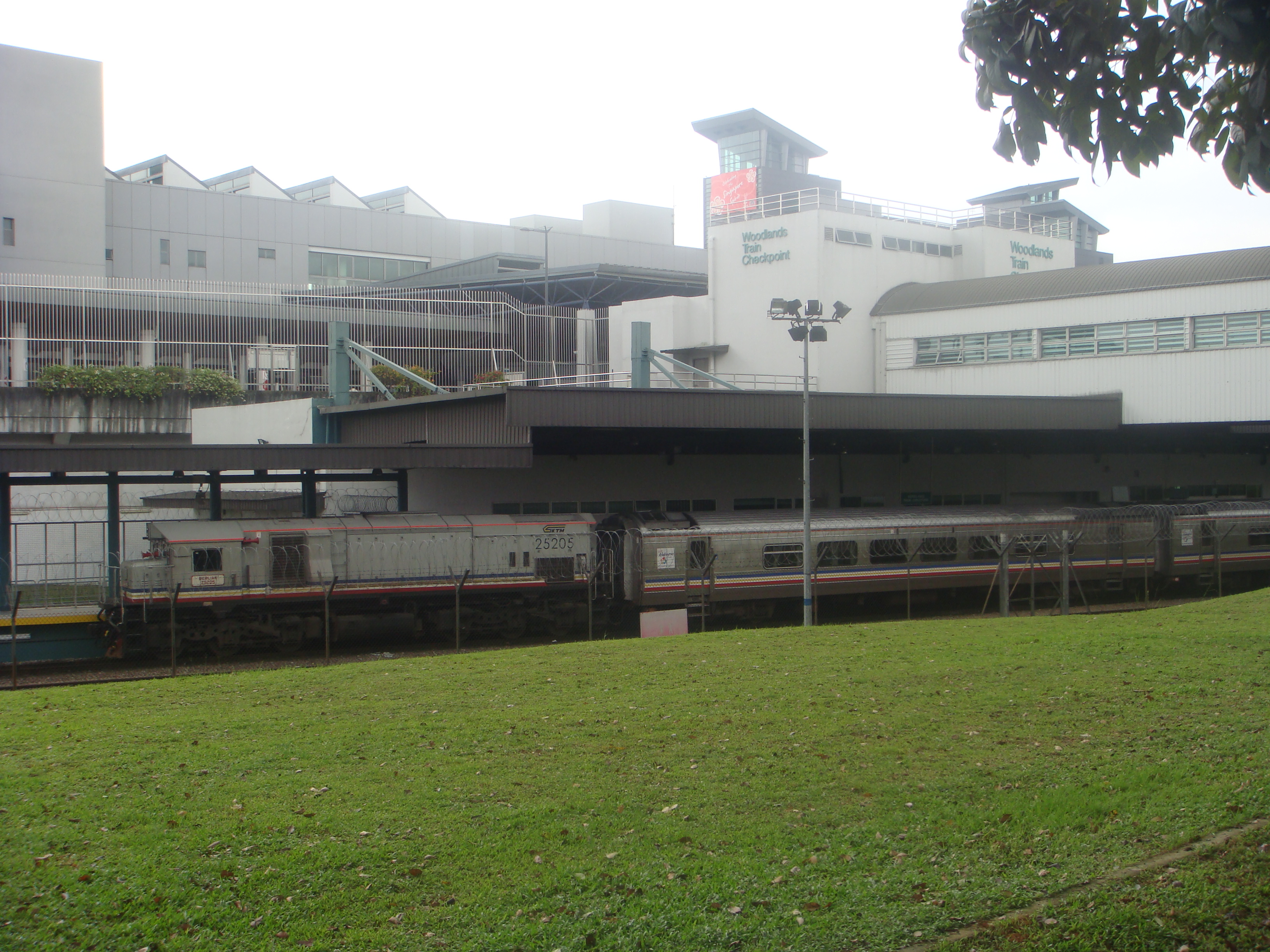
- A KTM Intercity train at Woodlands Train Checkpoint

General information
- Other names: Malay: Pusat Pemeriksaan Kereta Api Woodlands; Chinese: 兀兰火车关卡; Tamil: ஊட்லண்ட்ஸ் தொடருந்து சோதனைச் சாவடி
- Location: 11 Woodlands Crossing, Singapore 738103
- Owner: Immigration and Checkpoints Authority
- Operator: Keretapi Tanah Melayu
- Line: West Coast Line
- Platforms: 1 side platform
- Tracks: 2
- Connections: 46069 Bus stop; Stn Taxi stand

Construction
- Structure type: At-grade

Other information
- Status: Preparation of closure

History
- Opened: 1 August 1998; 28 years ago (border checkpoint); 1 July 2011; 15 years ago (passenger service)

Passengers
- 2026: 4,497 (inbound) and 2,240 (outbound)

Services
Preceding station	Keretapi Tanah Melayu (Intercity)	Following station
Johor Bahru Sentral Terminus	Shuttle Tebrau	Terminus
Former services
Preceding station	Keretapi Tanah Melayu	Following station
Terminus	Woodlands–Singapore Railway	Bukit Timah towards Tanjong Pagar
Location

Woodlands Train Checkpoint (abbreviated as WTCP) is a railway station and border checkpoint in Woodlands, Singapore. Located close to the Malaysia–Singapore border, the station is owned by Singapore's Immigration and Checkpoints Authority (ICA) and is operated by the Malaysian railway operator Keretapi Tanah Melayu (KTM) in agreement with the Singaporean authorities.

The facility is integrated with the Woodlands Checkpoint through a corridor and link bridge for commuters travelling by bus.

== History ==
=== Old Woodlands railway station ===
In 1903, the former Woodlands railway station opened as an extension of the original line on the Singapore–Kranji Railway to Tank Road. Upon the opening of the Johor–Singapore Causeway in 1923, the station was relocated along a more direct route to the causeway the following year. The station closed in the mid-1930s.

=== New Woodlands Train Checkpoint station ===
In 1990, a new station in Woodlands was proposed to replace Tanjong Pagar as the Singapore terminus of the KTM West Coast railway line. Constructed from 1992 to 1997, the Woodlands Train Checkpoint was opened on 1 August 1998 to become the new Singapore border control facility for rail passengers.

=== Border control issues ===
At the time of the opening of the new station, there were no boarding facilities, as northbound passengers heading towards Malaysia were required to clear Malaysia's customs and immigration at Tanjong Pagar, and northbound trains stopped at the Woodlands Train Checkpoint for Singapore exit immigration checks only. However, southbound passengers could disembark after clearing Singapore's customs and immigration at the Woodlands Train Checkpoint, as they had already cleared Malaysian customs and immigration at the old Johor Bahru railway station (which was subsequently replaced by JB Sentral).

Until 1998, both Malaysia and Singapore had their customs and immigration facilities for rail passengers at Tanjong Pagar. Singapore decided to relocate its customs and immigration facilities to Woodlands despite Malaysia's unwillingness to vacate the Tanjong Pagar railway station according to the Malaysia–Singapore Points of Agreement of 1990. The Singaporean Immigration and Checkpoints Authority ceased operations at Tanjong Pagar and moved into the Woodlands Train Checkpoint on 1 August 1998.

While providing immigration facilities for southbound passengers at JB Sentral, Malaysian customs and immigration clearance for northbound passengers remained at Tanjong Pagar, refusing to relocate to either the Woodlands Train Checkpoint or JB Sentral. This peculiarity resulted in passengers travelling to Malaysia being granted entry to Malaysia before being granted exit from Singapore, which is contrary to international practice.

To circumvent the problem, Malaysian Immigration officers in Tanjong Pagar did not stamp passports, instead the passports were scanned into a computer system, and passengers were provided with a stamped embarkation/disembarkation card to be retained until leaving Malaysia. This still posed problems for some visitors when leaving Malaysia due to the lack of a physical endorsement in their passports, especially for those who lost the card while in Malaysia.

The border control issues were resolved in 2010 following an agreement between Malaysia and Singapore to permanently close the Tanjong Pagar railway station as well as the Woodlands-Tanjong Pagar railway line. KTM services, together with Malaysian customs and immigration, relocated their operations to the Woodlands Train Checkpoint on 1 July 2011. The Woodlands Train Checkpoint subsequently became the southern terminus of the KTM West Coast Line.

=== Present ===
Today, northbound passengers clear both Singapore's and Malaysia's customs and immigration at the Woodlands Train Checkpoint before boarding the train for Malaysia, while southbound passengers clear Malaysian customs and immigration at JB Sentral and Singapore customs and immigration at Woodlands Train Checkpoint.

The station will be closed by mid-2027 in conjunction with the opening of the new Johor Bahru–Singapore Rapid Transit System, as well as to make way for the expansion of Woodlands Checkpoint. This will mark the complete withdrawal of KTM from Singapore.

== Train services ==
A diesel powered shuttle train service, known as Shuttle Tebrau and operated by KTM Intercity, runs from the Woodlands Train Checkpoint to JB Sentral. There are 31 trips daily: 18 trips from Johor Bahru and 13 trips from Woodlands. KTM Intercity train services that previously linked the Woodlands Train Checkpoint with various destinations in Malaysia were truncated to terminate at JB Sentral following the introduction of the shuttle train service on 1 July 2015.

The diesel powered Eastern & Oriental Express (E&O) has its southern terminus at Woodlands Train Checkpoint. The E&O is a luxury train that is run by Belmond Limited, the same operator of the Venice-Simplon Orient Express. From 1993 to 2021, the E&O has been used as a means of recreational travel between Singapore and Bangkok with stopovers at places of interest in Malaysia and Thailand. It was suspended in 2022 due to the COVID-19 pandemic. It resumed operations in February 2024 between Singapore and Malaysian venues.

== Transport connections ==
The Woodlands Train Checkpoint features both a domestic taxi stand and a domestic ride-hailing (private hire cars) stand.

The station functions as the de facto domestic public bus stop, taxi stand and ride-hailing stand (with much higher bus frequencies, bus seat availability and taxi availability) for the Woodlands Checkpoint, as all bus and taxi services that ply through the Woodlands Checkpoint itself are fully cross-border transport services.

=== Public bus services ===
The station is served by 7 local public bus services and a single cross-border public bus service through the bus stop (No. 46069), located adjacent to the pick-up point along Woodlands Centre Road. The bus services are linked to nearby public transport nodes with access to Singapore's Mass Rapid Transit (MRT) network.

Since 17 March 2019, bus service 913 (West Loop) was amended to serve Marsiling and Woodlands Street 13, and no longer called at the bus stops along the northern stretch of Woodlands Centre Road, including the Woodlands Train Checkpoint.

Public Bus Services at Bus Stop No. 46069 - Woodlands Train Checkpoint
Bus Service	Destination	Nearby Local Transport Nodes	Remarks	Route Ref
170 (Larkin)	Larkin Sentral Terminal (Johor Bahru)	-	Cross-border bound trip terminating at Larkin Sentral Terminal (Johor Bahru), for access to Woodlands Checkpoint Departure Hall mandatory alighting point by bus (2 stops).; Domestic-bound trip of the same service terminating at Queen Street Bus Terminal also calls at the same bus stop.	
170 (Queen Street)	Queen Street Bus Terminal	NS7; Kranji (7 stops) DT1 – BP6; Bukit Panjang (23 stops)	Cross-border bound trip of the same service terminating at Larkin Sentral Terminal (Johor Bahru) also calls at the same bus stop.	
178	Woodlands Bus Interchange	NS9 TE2; Woodlands (7 stops)		
856	Yishun Bus Interchange	TE1 – RTS; Woodlands North (6 stops) NS11; Sembawang (23 stops) NS13; Yishun (32 stops)	Evening peak-hour short trip service 856A terminates at this bus stop.; Morning peak-hour short trip service 856B terminates at Bus Stop 58159 (Aft Admiral Hill, located near Sembawang MRT), and does not continue to Yishun.	
903	Woodlands Bus Interchange	NS9 TE2; Woodlands (11 stops)		
911 (West Loop)	Woodlands Bus Interchange	NS9 TE2; Woodlands (7 stops)	Short trip service 911T terminates at Woodlands Interchange, and does not continue on East Loop.	
912 (West Loop)	Woodlands Bus Interchange	NS9 TE2; Woodlands (13 stops)	Short trip service 912B terminates at Woodlands Interchange, and does not continue on East Loop.	
950	Woodlands Temporary Bus Interchange	NS8; Marsiling (4 stops) NS9 TE2; Woodlands (7 stops)		

== See also ==
- Rail transport in Singapore
- Malaysia–Singapore border
- Johor–Singapore Causeway
- Malaysia–Singapore Points of Agreement of 1990
- Bukit Timah railway station
- Tanjong Pagar railway station

=== Hong Kong ===
- Shenzhen Bay Control Point
- West Kowloon Station Mainland Port Area
