= Bukit Timah railway station =

Former train station in Bukit Timah, Singapore

Bukit Timah
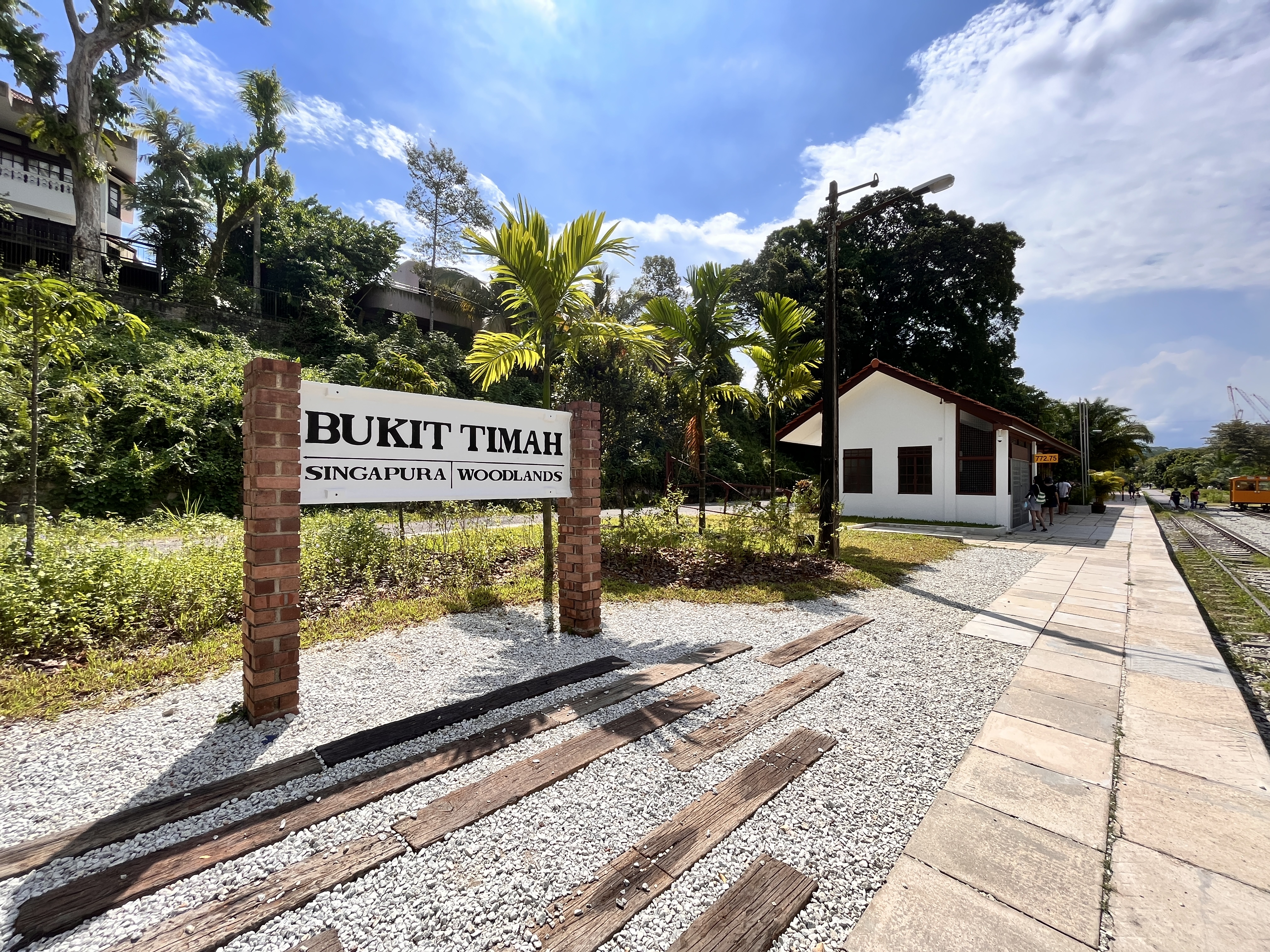
- The conserved Bukit Timah railway station

General information
- Location: 1 Blackmore Drive, Bukit Timah; Central Region; Singapore
- Coordinates: 1°20′03″N 103°46′52″E
- Owner: Singapore Land Authority
- Line: Formerly part of the Singapore Railway
- Platforms: 1 side platform
- Tracks: 3

Construction
- Structure type: At-grade
- Parking: None
- Cycle facilities: None

Other information
- Status: Conserved monument of the Urban Redevelopment Authority

History
- Opened: 3 May 1932; 94 years ago
- Closed: 1 July 2011; 15 years ago
- Rebuilt: 1 July 2022; 4 years ago (Note: As a cafe and museum.)
- Original company: Keretapi Tanah Melayu

Former services
Preceding station	Keretapi Tanah Melayu	Following station
Woodlands Terminus	Woodlands–Singapore Railway	Tanjong Pagar Terminus
Jurong towards Jurong Port	Jurong Freight Line	Terminus
Preceding station	Federated Malay States Railways	Following station
Bukit Panjang towards Kranji	Singapore–Kranji Railway (1932–1998)	Tanglin towards Tanjong Pagar
Bukit Panjang towards Woodlands	Singapore–Kranji Railway (1903–1932)	Holland Road towards Pasir Panjang

National monument of Singapore
- Designated: 27 May 2011; 15 years ago
Location

Bukit Timah railway station is a former railway station and crossing loop in Bukit Timah, in the westernmost part of the Central Region of Singapore.

Opened on the dismantled Tank Road mainline in 1903, it was rebuilt on the current Singapore–Johor Bahru KTM Intercity mainline in 1932, until the Jurong line shut down and it became a crossing loop station in the late 1940s until closure.

The station was a freight interchange for the now defunct Jurong line from 1965 to the early 1990s. The station closed in 2011, and it is now a conserved recreational building and museum that is part of the Rail Corridor.

== History ==
=== Early years ===
This station was the second to carry the name Bukit Timah and it was built on the new Deviation line from Bukit Batok to Tanjong Pagar in 1932. The original Bukit Timah Railway Station was a wooden construction at Pei Wah Avenue on the 1903 line from Woodlands to Singapore (River Valley Road) via Newton. The Singapore station was replaced in 1907 when a new station was built at Tank Road and the line extended to Pasir Panjang, the old station at River Valley road became a goods only station incorporated into the later expanded Tank Road complex.

When the line to Tanjong Pagar opened all passenger traffic on the line to Tank Road ceased and the old Bukit Timah Station was closed along with all the other stations on the old line which was closed to all traffic and lifted within a few years. The section from Tank Road to Tanjong Pagar continued for a short while to clear out all the freight and the section from Tanjong Pagar to Pasir Panjang was taken over by the Singapore Harbour Board.

Passenger traffic continued from the new Bukit Timah station until 1965 when Singapore was expelled from Malaysia, after which customs and immigration facilities were set up at Tanjong Pagar. Previously they had been carried out on the train at Johore Bahru during a lengthy stop.

The station is built in the style of traditional small town stations. Workers of the railways constituted of mainly Tamils and Malays, and were given much work privileges which include free medical facilities for themselves and their families. The station served as a commodities transport linkage for the then heavily industrialized Bukit Timah to other stations, allowing goods to be produced and transported efficiently. Numerous houses could be found along the vicinity of the railways. These houses ranges from typical metal sheds that provides services the railway staff's automobile needs to brick houses lived by residents.

This station was between Tanjong Pagar railway station at the southern end of Singapore island and Woodlands Train Checkpoint at the northern end. It was a crossing loop station and signalling control house.

The locomotive and two passenger coaches of a KTM train bound for Kuala Lumpur derailed near the Bukit Timah station just after 8am on 9 November 2010. None of the 60 passengers on board were injured. As a result of the derailment, all KTM train services from Singapore on the day of the incident were cancelled, southbound services terminated at JB Sentral and services the next day were rescheduled.

=== Closure and conservation ===
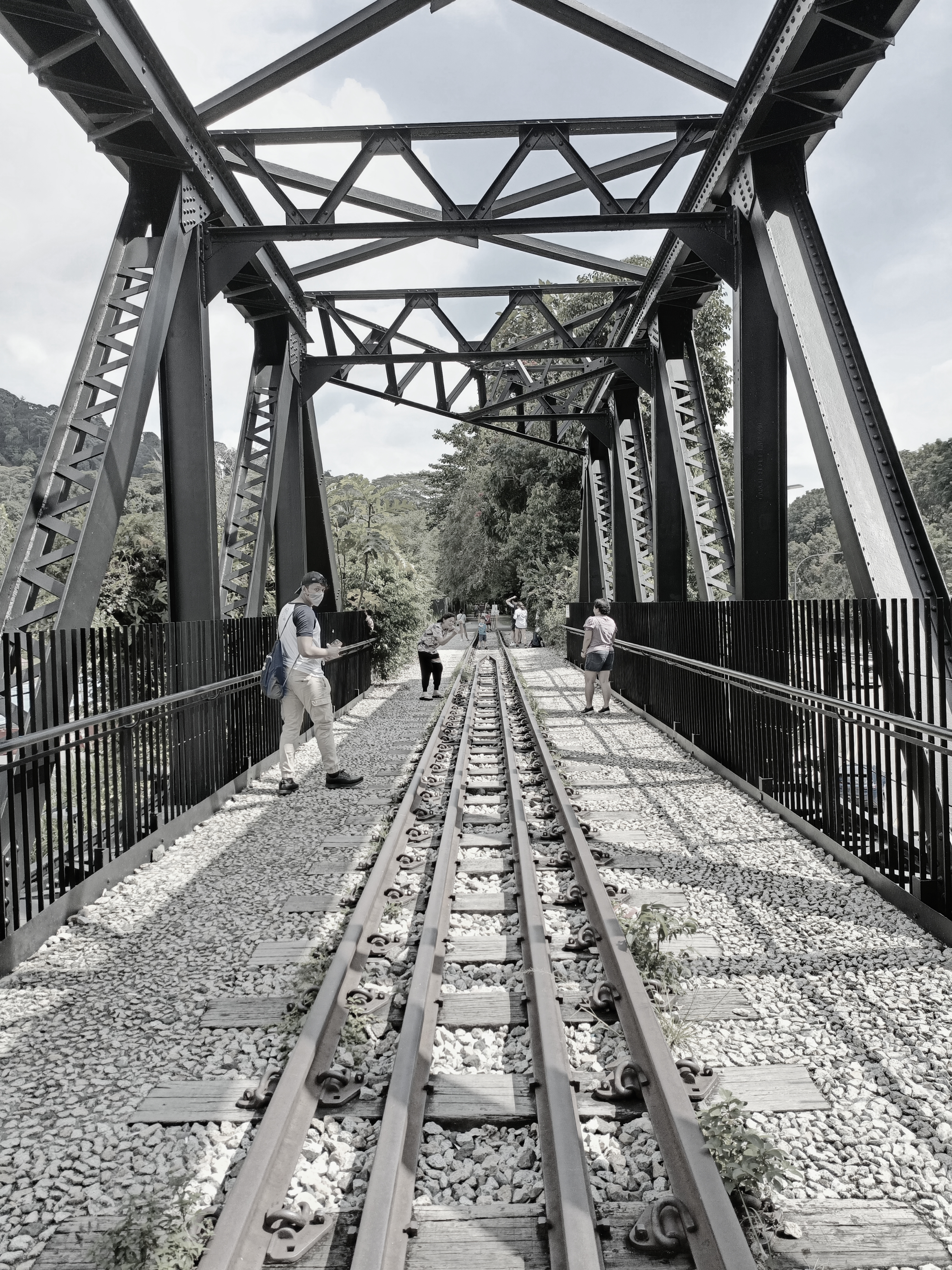
Former railway track

The station, along with the line between Woodlands at the northern edge of Singapore and Tanjong Pagar at the southern end, closed on 1 July 2011 and was returned to Singapore. The station was gazetted as a conserved building previously on 27 May that same year.

Following closure, the railway track between Tanjong Pagar and Woodlands was removed. A few metres of track have been left between the platforms at Bukit Timah, as well as the iron bridge across Bukit Timah Road, immediately to the north of the station. The rest of the trackbed has been turfed over and is now open to the public as a linear park, as part of Singapore's Nature Society and URA's "Rail Corridor" project.

The Bukit Timah station buildings were reopened to the public by the Singapore Land Authority on 16 September 2011. The buildings can be visited during daylight hours, but refurbishment or development would not occur until 2021 with the former track bed being refurbished into a recreational pavement while the former station was renovated into a museum and the former station master's house into a cafe. The next nearest station is at King Albert Park MRT station on the Downtown line, which opened on 27 December 2015.

On 1 July 2022, after two years of restoration work, the Bukit Timah railway station officially re-opened to the public once again, as part of the new 4.3-hectare community space around the mid-point of the Rail Corridor.

== Gallery ==
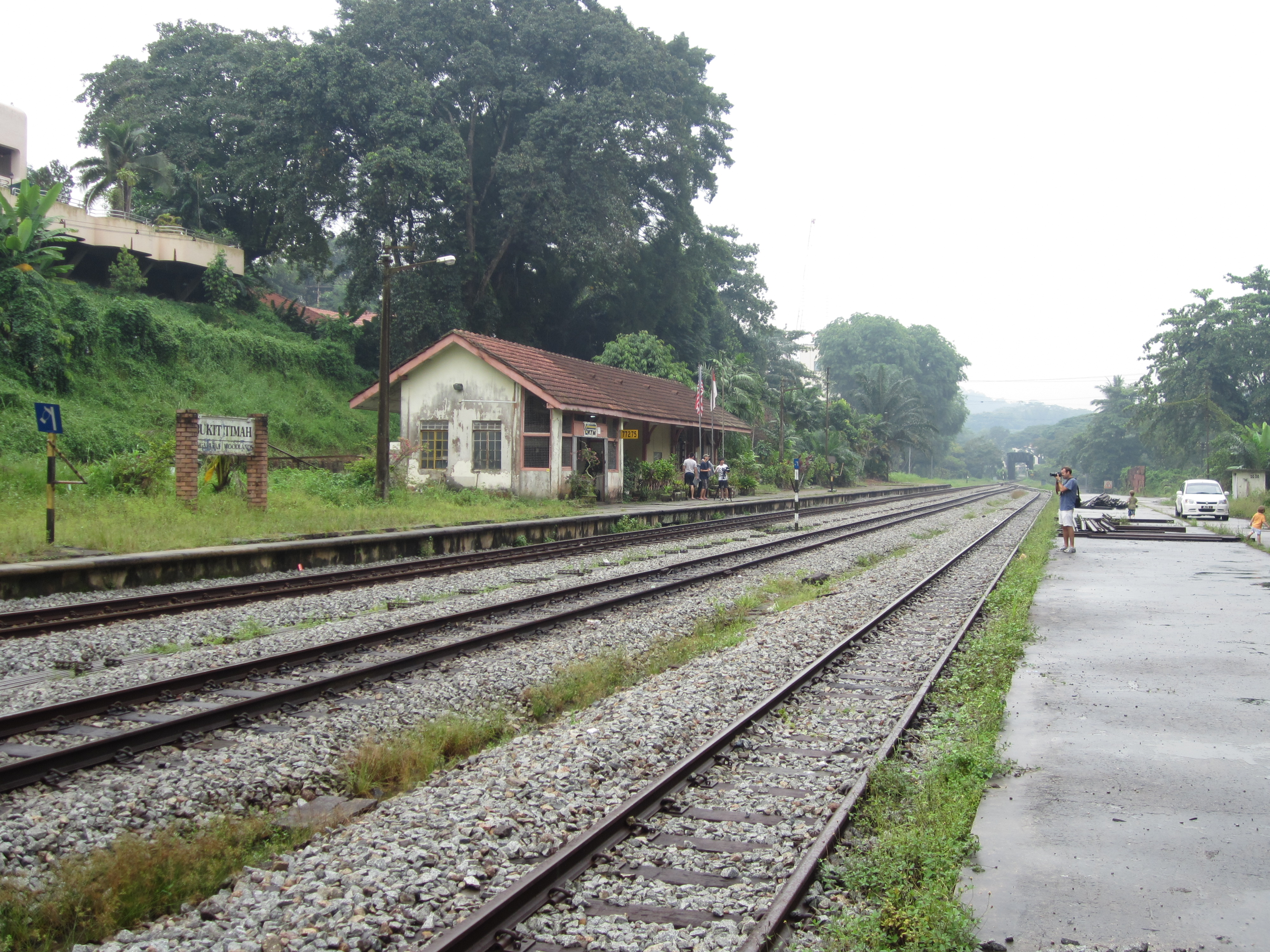
The Bukit Timah railway station when it was in operation, with the second version of the station building in centre

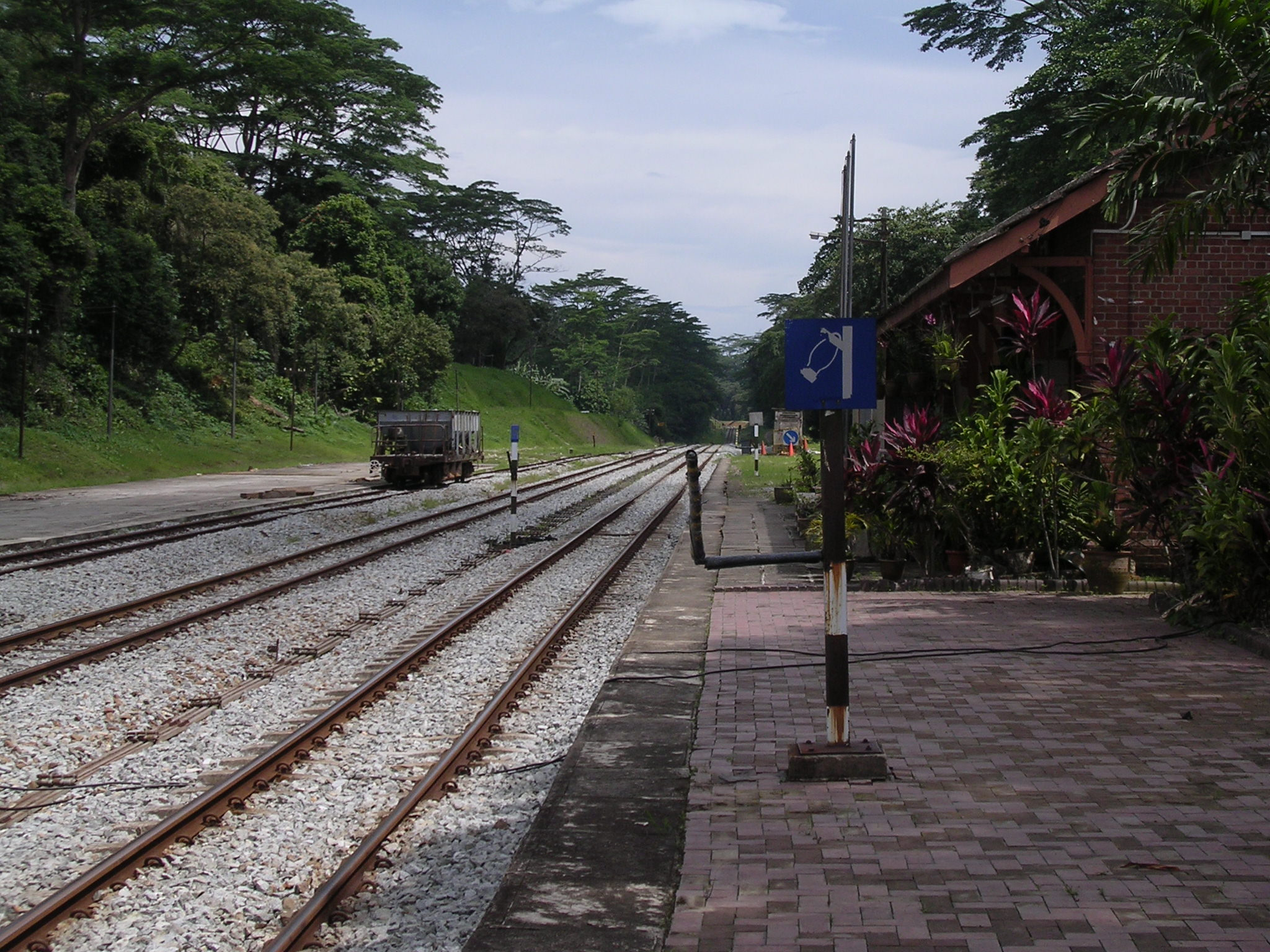
Bukit Timah railway station before closure

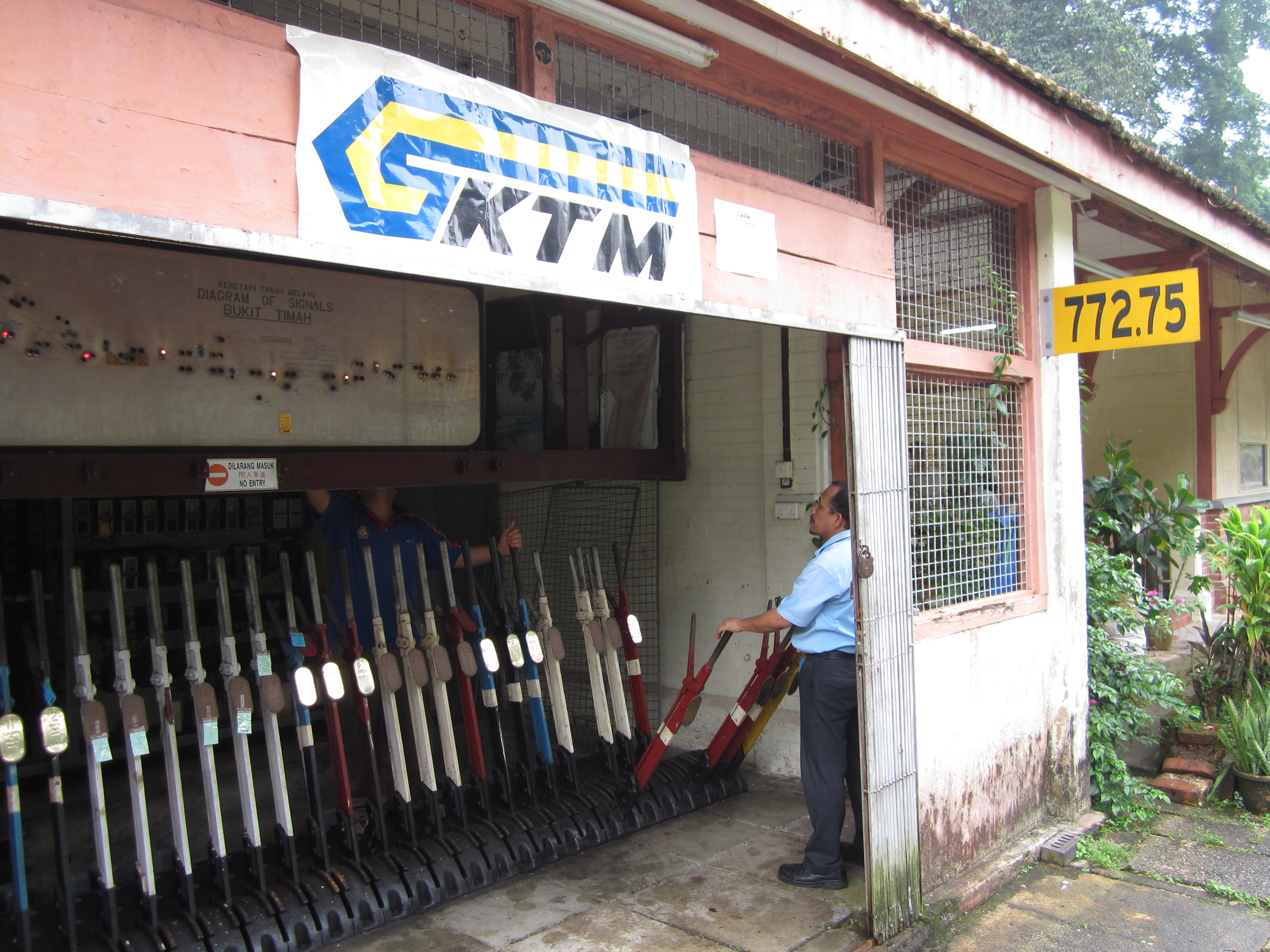
The manually operated signalling room at Bukit Timah before closure

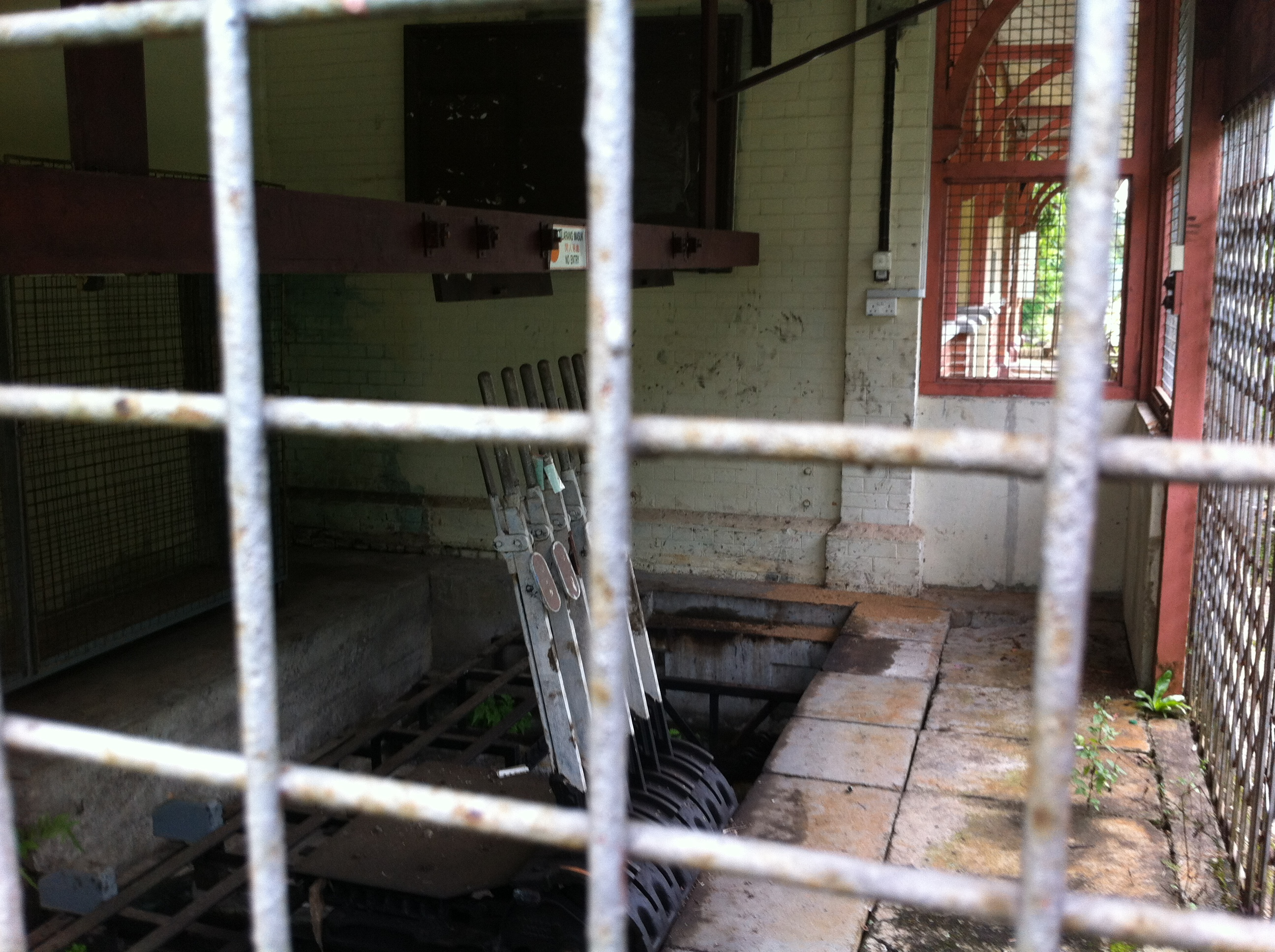
The same location in July 2012 following closure and removal of most fixtures and fittings

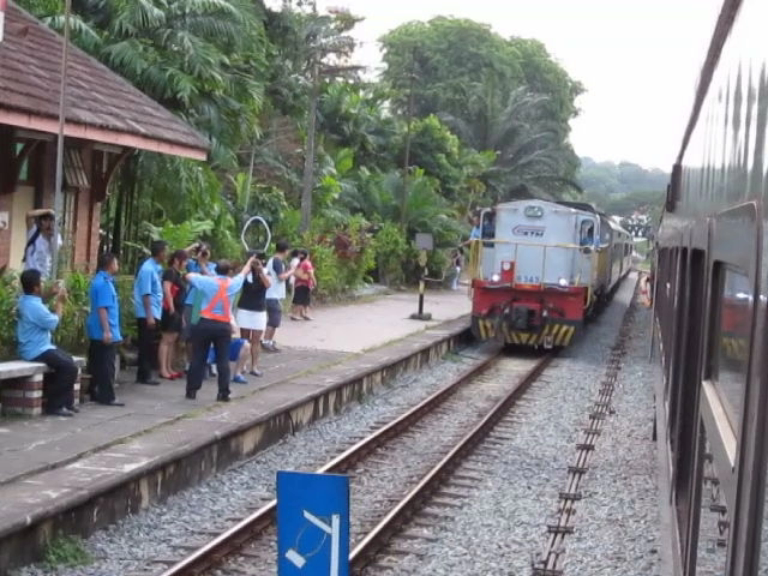
Train driver dropping a key token for the northern section between Woodlands and Bukit Timah.

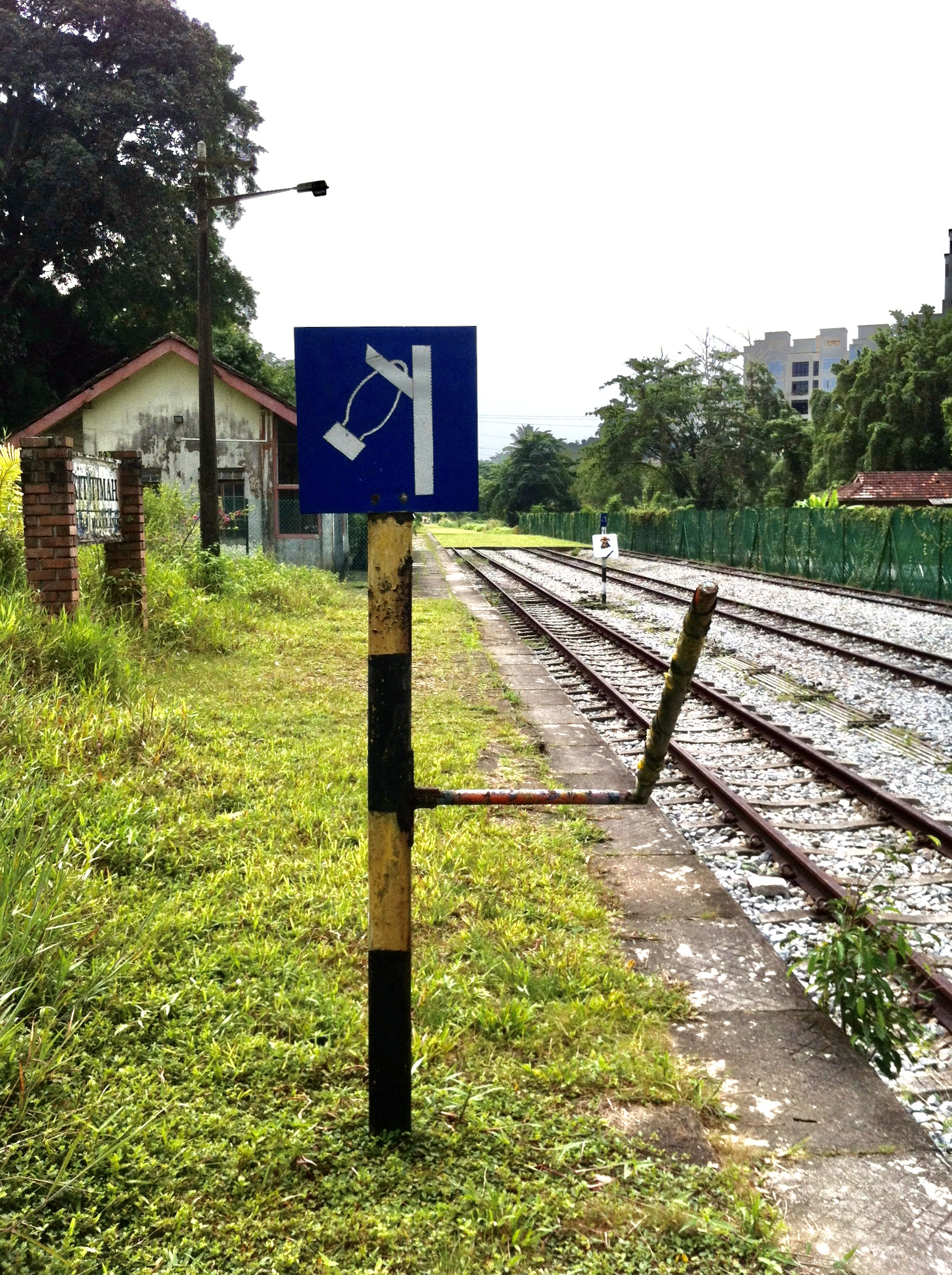
One of the old stands for receiving the key token remains at Bukit Timah railway station in July 2012

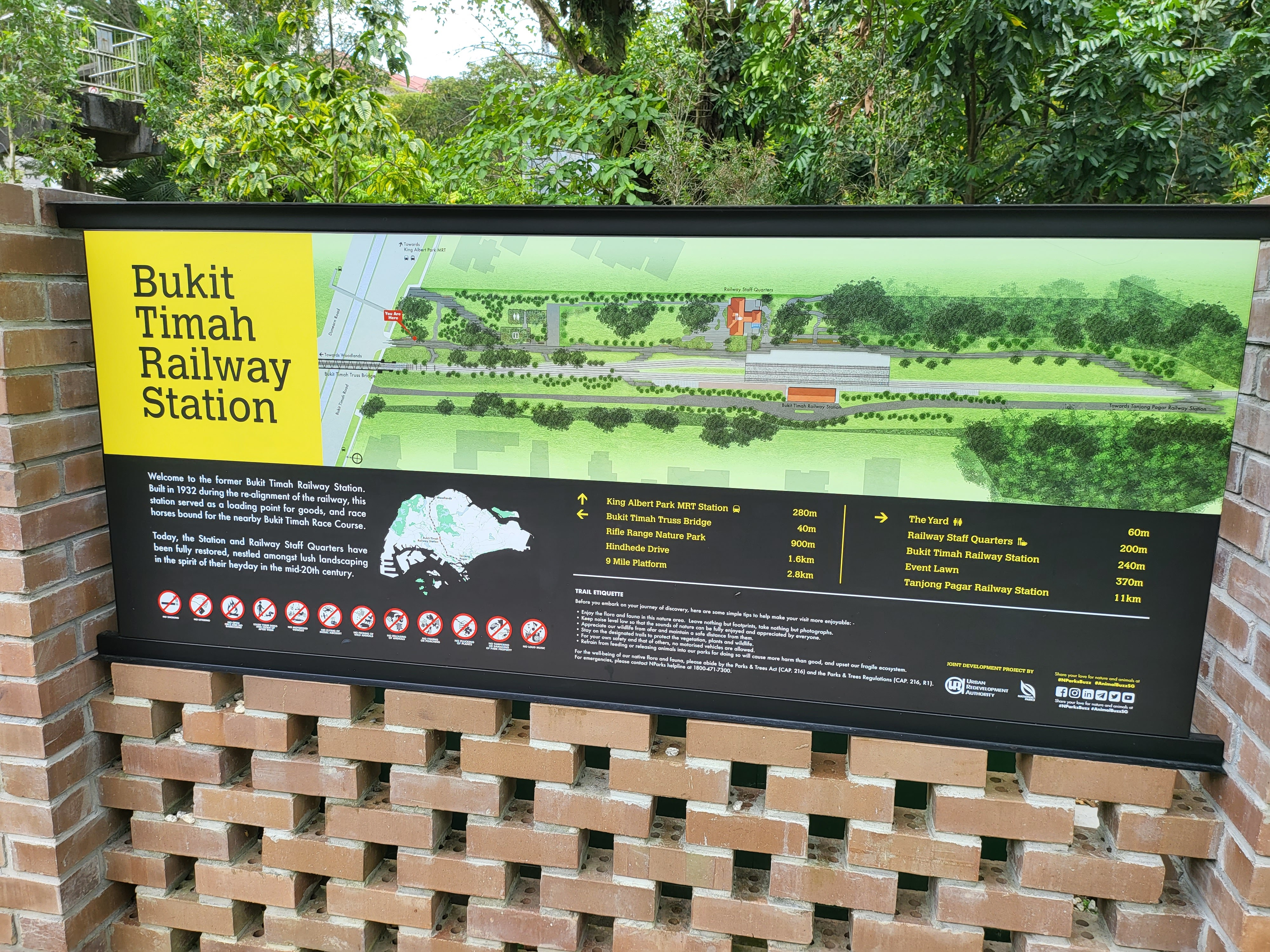
A guide to the conserved station

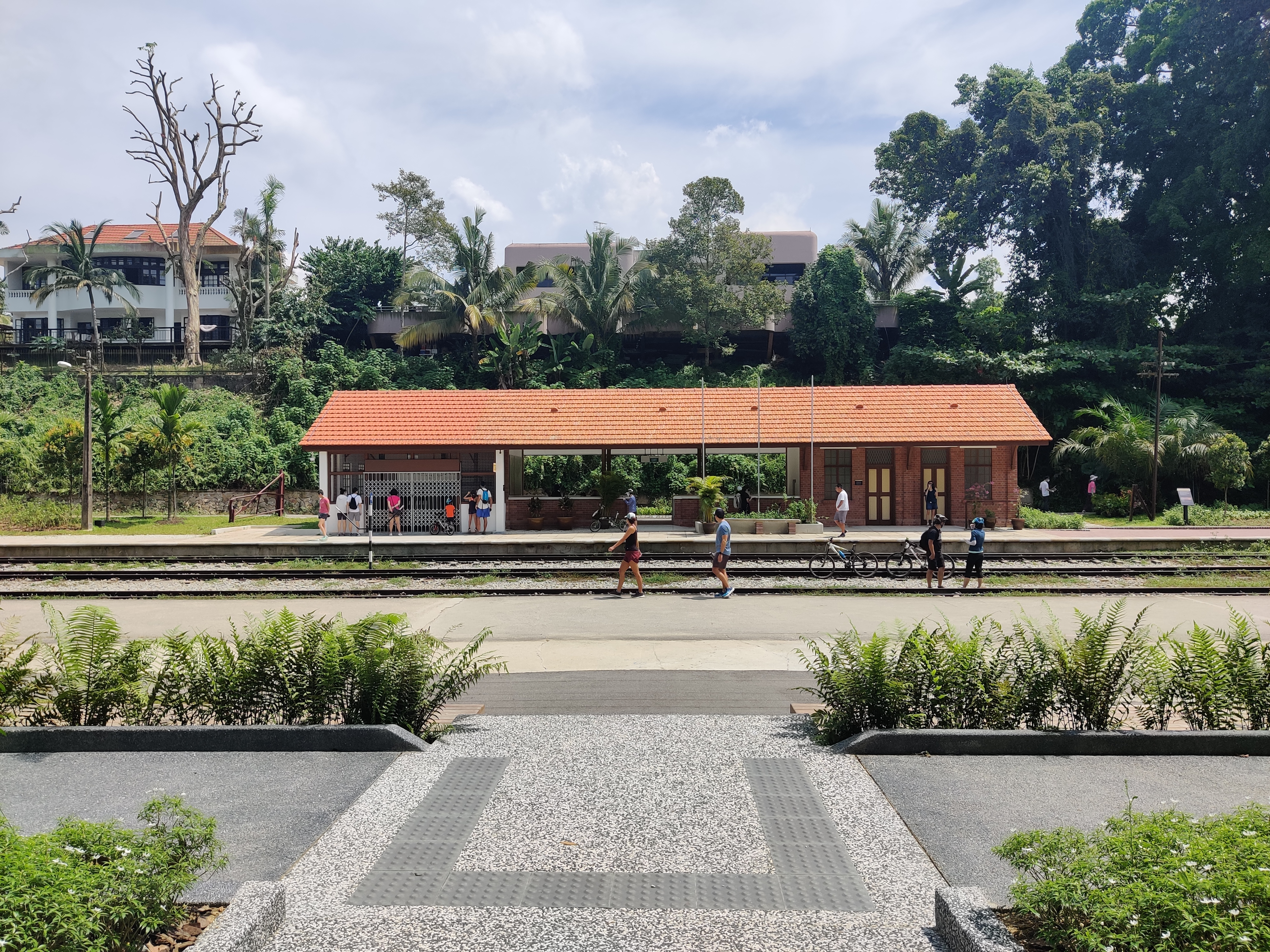
The conserved Bukit Timah railway station

== See also ==
- Malaysia–Singapore Points of Agreement of 1990
- Rail transport in Singapore
