= Kranji railway station, Singapore =

Railway station in Singapore

Kranji

General information
- Location: Singapore
- Coordinates: 1.43189°N 103.75857°E

Other information
- Status: Demolished

History
- Original company: Keretapi Tanah Melayu

Former services
Preceding station	Federated Malay States Railways	Following station
Terminus	Singapore–Kranji Railway (1932–1998)	Bukit Panjang towards Tanjong Pagar
Location

Kranji railway station was a railway station on the Singapore–Kranji Railway which served Kranji in the 20th century.

== History ==
Kranji railway station was opened to the public on an unknown date as the new northern terminus of the Singapore–Kranji Railway, after Woodlands station closed a few years prior. It would then continue north towards Johor Bahru station on the KTM West Coast railway line.

As it was decided that Tank Road station was unfit to be the terminus of the line, it was decided that the Bukit Timah-Tank Road section of the line would be abandoned, and the line would instead deviate in between Bukit Panjang station and Bukit Timah station, travelling down a different route which ran along the west of the main town, to a new terminal station at Tanjong Pagar, with a new station being built at Bukit Timah, and two new stations at Tanglin and Alexandra. In November 1955, a new service was introduced in which lorries would arrive at the station in the morning and in the evening to bring people to and fro from work from the station. This was introduced due to the low ridership of the station.

By 1984. the station had already been abandoned and demolished. The site of the former station was one of several possible locations for a railbus station for the railbus line that the Keretapi Tanah Melayu (KTM) planned to build in Singapore.
