= Tanjong Pagar railway station =

Former railway station in Singapore

Tanjong Pagar
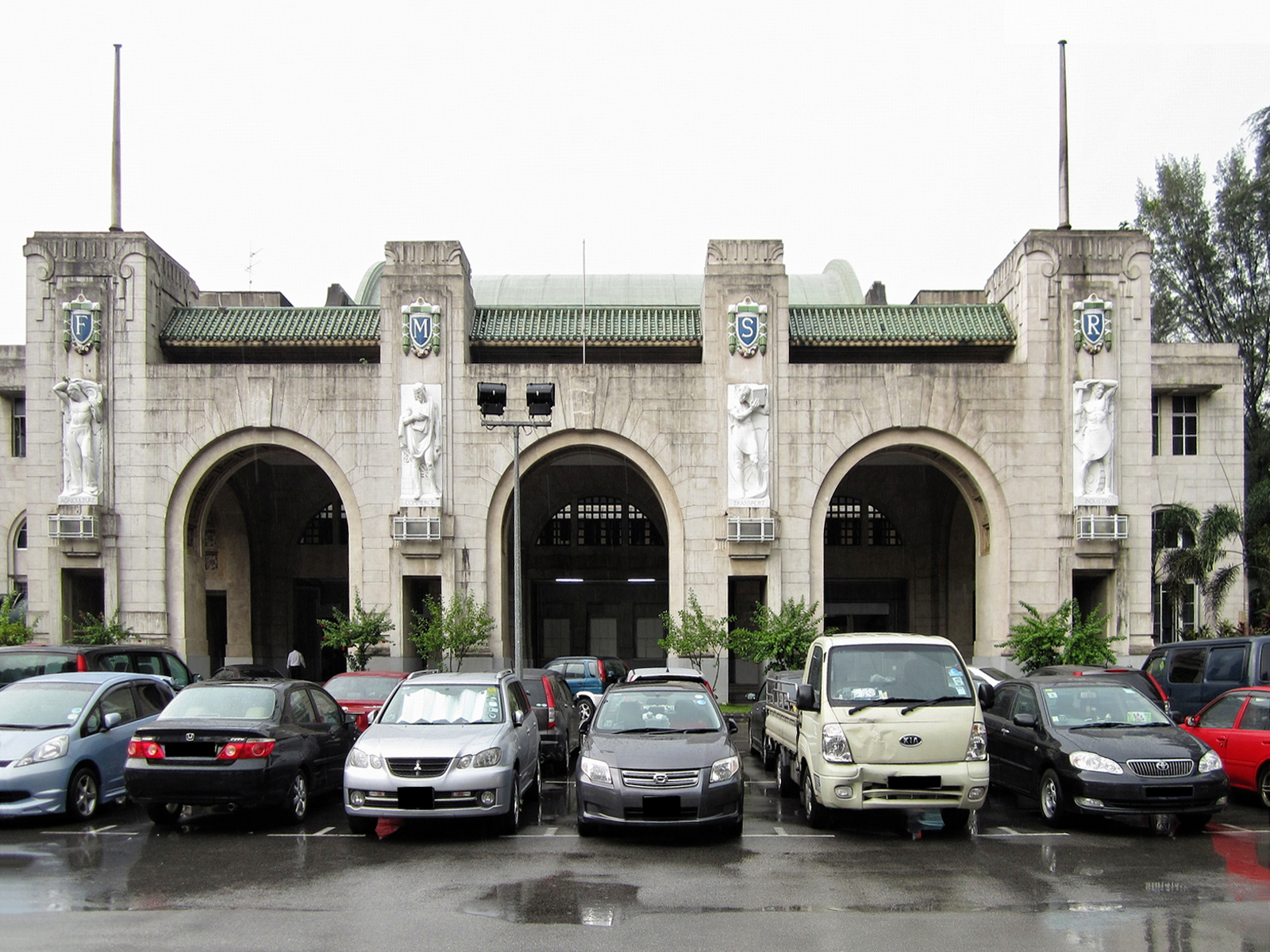
- The art deco Tanjong Pagar Railway Station, circa 2011. The large initials "F M S R" stand for Federated Malay States Railways. The four white marble reliefs beneath these initials are allegories of Agriculture, Commerce, Transport and Industry.

General information
- Other names: Singapore; Keppel Road
- Location: 30 Keppel Road, Singapore 089059
- Coordinates: 1°16′22″N 103°50′17″E
- Owner: Singapore Land Authority
- Line: Formerly part of the Singapore railway
- Platforms: 3 (1 island platform, 2 side platforms)
- Tracks: 3

Construction
- Parking: Yes
- Architectural style: Art Deco

Other information
- Status: Gazetted monument of the National Heritage Board

History
- Opened: 3 May 1932; 94 years ago
- Closed: 1 July 2011; 15 years ago
- Original company: Keretapi Tanah Melayu

Former services
Preceding station	Keretapi Tanah Melayu	Following station
Bukit Timah towards Woodlands	Woodlands–Singapore Railway	Terminus
Preceding station	Federated Malay States Railways	Following station
Alexandra Halt towards Kranji	Singapore–Kranji Railway (1932–1998)	Terminus

National monument of Singapore
- Designated: 9 April 2011; 15 years ago
- Reference no.: 64
Location

Tanjong Pagar railway station, (Note: (Malay: Stesen Keretapi Tanjong Pagar; Chinese: 丹戎巴葛火车总站; Tamil: தஞ்சோங் பகார் ரயில் நிலையம்)) also known as Singapore railway station (Note: (Malay: Stesen Keretapi Singapura; Chinese: 新加坡火车站; Tamil: சிங்கப்பூர் ரயில் நிலையம்)) or Keppel Road railway station, is a former railway station located at 30 Keppel Road in Singapore. The station was the southern terminus of the network operated by Keretapi Tanah Melayu (KTM), the main railway operator in Malaysia, until 30 June 2011 when the station ceased operations with relocation of the KTM station to Woodlands Train Checkpoint. The land on which the station and the KTM railway tracks stood was originally owned by KTM and over which Malaysia had partial sovereignty. This arrangement lasted until 30 June 2011, when rail service to Tanjong Pagar was ended and the land reverted to Singapore.

The main building of the railway station was gazetted as a national monument on 9 April 2011, completing one of the objectives of the new Points of Agreement between Malaysia and Singapore. The railway station is now integrated with Cantonment MRT station.

== History ==
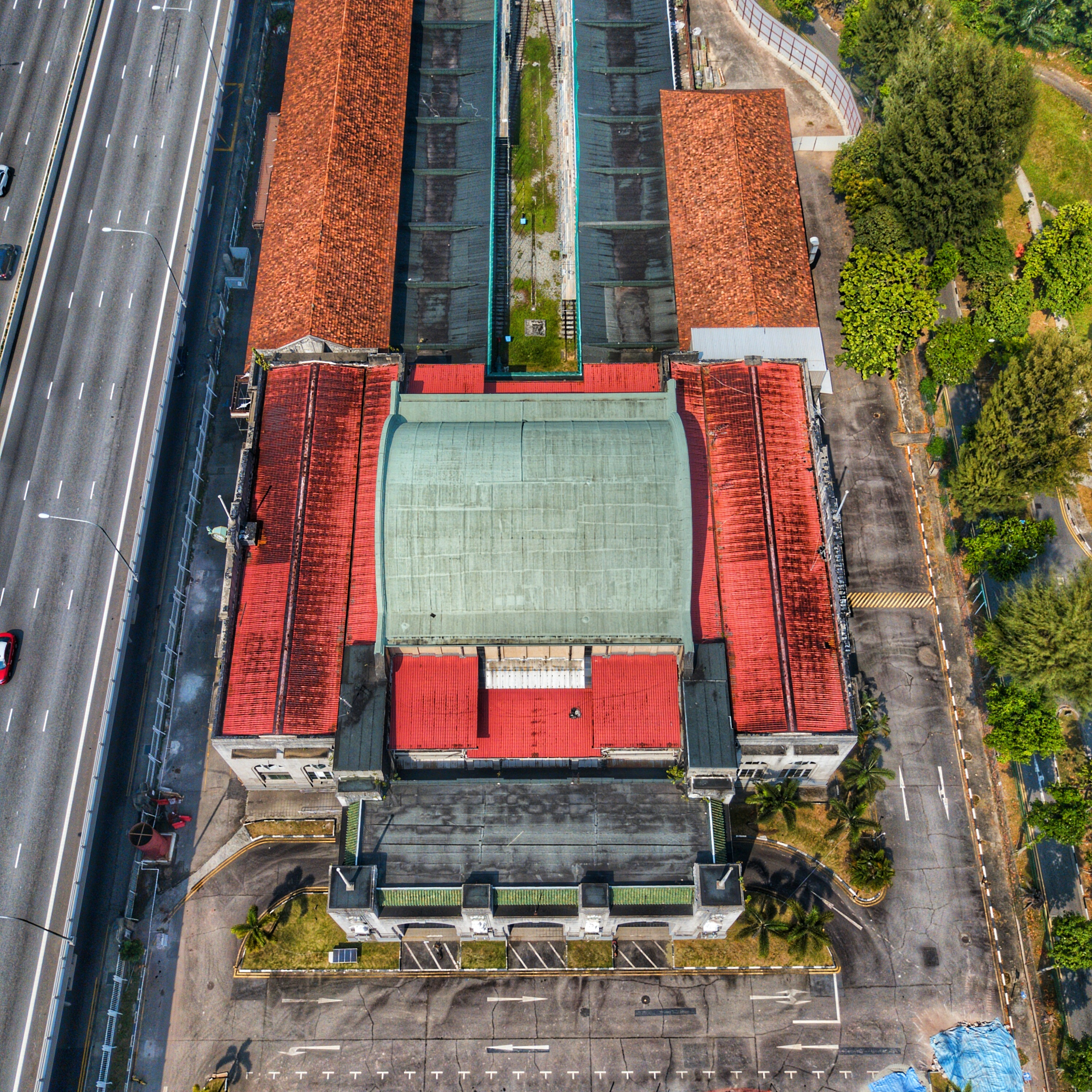
Topdown view of Tanjong Pagar Railway Station in 2018

Before the Johor–Singapore Causeway across the Straits of Johor was built, the railway in Singapore was limited to the island. The construction of the causeway began in 1919, and it was opened to goods trains on 17 September 1923 and to passenger trains on 1 October 1923. Previously, passengers and goods, particularly to service the transportation of tin and rubber industry in Malaya were transferred at Woodlands to a ferry to Johor Bahru and the connecting train on the peninsula. Tanjong Pagar railway station was completed on 3 May 1932 and officially opened by Sir Cecil Clementi. It was around for 79 years before it ceased operations on 1 July 2011 to be reserved as the Singapore Railway Museum.

=== Singapore Government Railway ===
In 1859, Captain William Cloughton built the first dry dock. With the emergence of steamships and growth of shipping industry, Tanjong Pagar Dock Company was formed in 1864, building wharves in the area. The area grew and was known as the ‘New Harbour’ shortly before being renamed as Keppel Harbour in 1900 by Acting Governor, Sir Alexander Swettenham.

Subsequently, with much political demands, plans to build a railway through Singapore, primarily to service the New Harbour, came underway in 1899 and the Singapore-Kranji Railway was completed in 1903. Between 1906 & 1907, the line was extended southwards from the terminus station at Tank Road to Tanjong Pagar and the wharves. It was eventually disused due to noise complaints by nearby residents.

=== Train services ===
KTM used to run six daily KTM Intercity trains between Singapore and Kuala Lumpur, the capital city of Malaysia. It also ran several other trains between Singapore and other parts of Peninsular Malaysia, such as Kelantan state in the northeast. It also operated a shuttle service between Johor Bahru and Singapore for commuters. Until 30 June 2011, the stops in Singapore were at Woodlands (for immigration clearance by Singapore Immigration and disembarkation of passengers travelling from Malaysia) and Tanjong Pagar (embarkation and disembarkation). Since 1 July 2011, the only stop in Singapore is at Woodlands.

Tanjong Pagar and Outram Park MRT stations are approximately 1km from the Tanjong Pagar railway station.

=== Cessation of operations ===
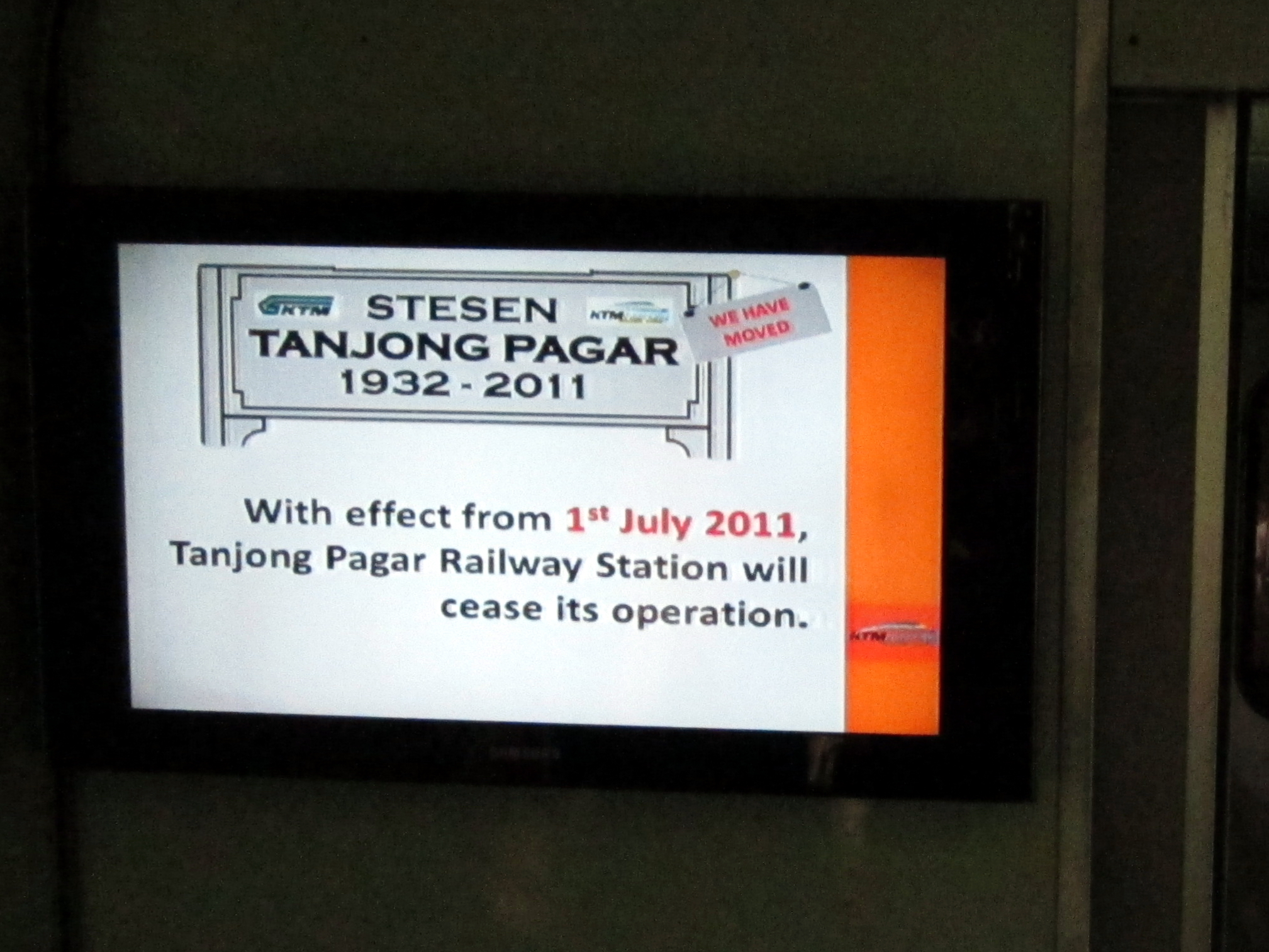
A notice of the cessation of operations at the Tanjong Pagar train station displayed on board a train from Kuala Lumpur to Singapore (Tanjong Pagar) on 26 June 2011, during the last week of the station's operations.

Following an agreement between the governments of Malaysia and Singapore on 24 May 2010, railway operations at the station ceased from 1 July 2011. The conserved building may be integrated with future developments on the site or turned into a museum. KTM's southern terminus was relocated to the Woodlands Train Checkpoint.

The closure of the line between Tanjong Pagar and the Woodlands checkpoint was something that had been considered for some 20 years with the intention made clear through the Malaysia–Singapore Points of Agreement of 1990, though the exact details could not be agreed upon until the agreement was signed between the two countries in 2010. Though supported by some, the closure was opposed and lamented by others as representing a great loss of Singapore's heritage and of a key public transportation facility. At the time of closure, Singapore had already built 180 km of domestic MRT and LRT lines combined.

The main building of the railway station was gazetted as a national monument on 9 April 2011.

The station was closed on 26 December 2016.

=== Proposed redevelopment ===
In 2015, the Urban Redevelopment Authority (URA) proposed that the station be converted into multi-functional community space as part of the revamp of the Rail Corridor stretching from Kranji to Tanjong Pagar. A request for design plan was announced. The winning proposal for Tanjong Pagar Railway Station includes a public park in front of the station named Station Green, and an integrated entrance to Cantonment MRT station. Facilities such as an auditorium and art gallery would be added, and the Railway Corridor would become a linear park that would be nearly ten times longer than New York's High Line. The redevelopment is set to take place over 20 years.

To facilitate construction of Cantonment MRT station, the platform canopy structures of the railway station were relocated to a nearby restoration yard in November 2017. Subsequently, a 580 m (1,900 ft) segment of the old railway platforms were dismantled in March 2018 as part of a S$33.5 million (US$24.3 million) heritage preservation effort.

The station is now integrated with Cantonment MRT station.

== Architecture ==
Tanjong Pagar railway station

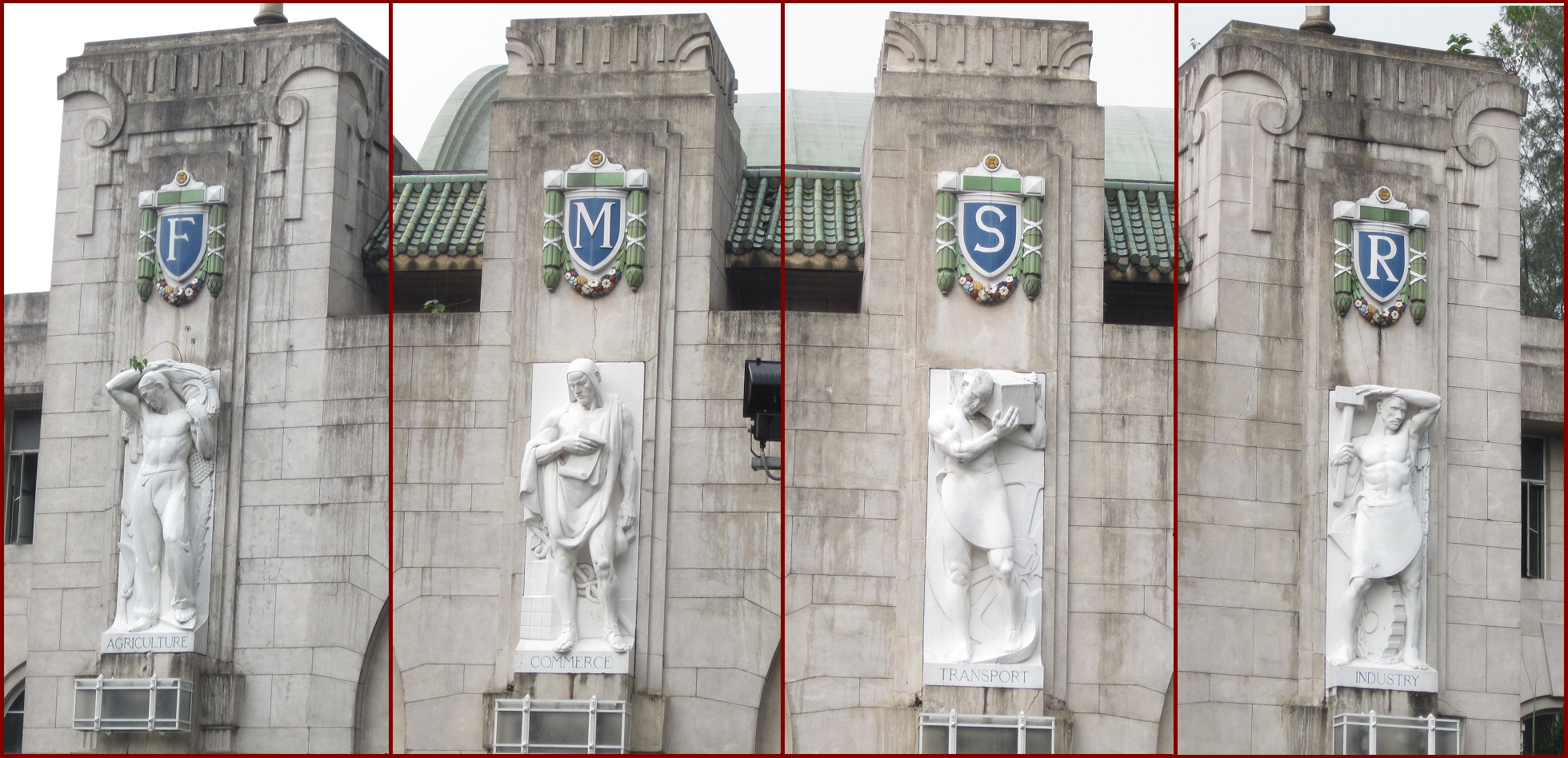
Four marble statues by Angiolo Vannetti

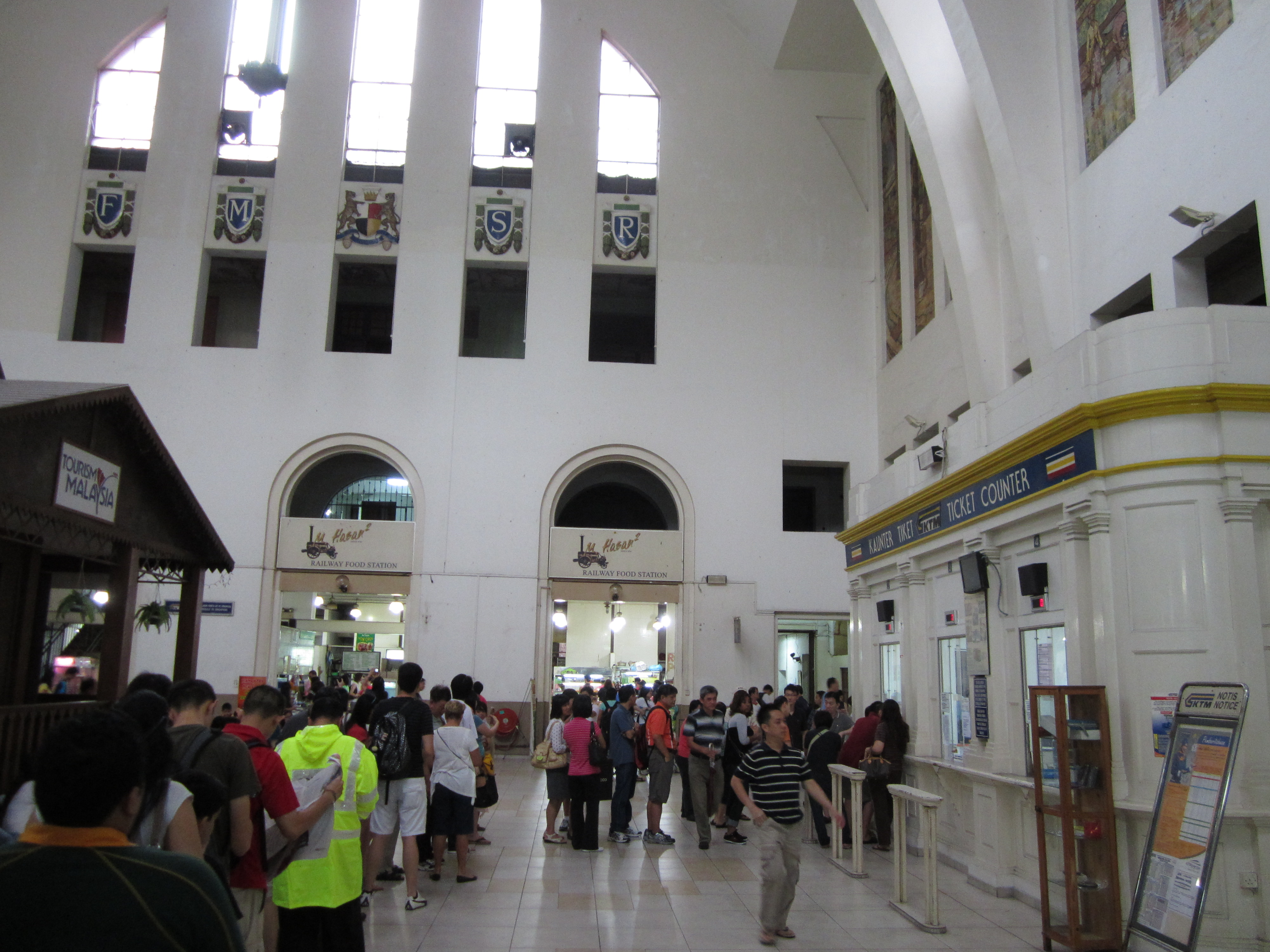
The interior hall of Tanjong Pagar station

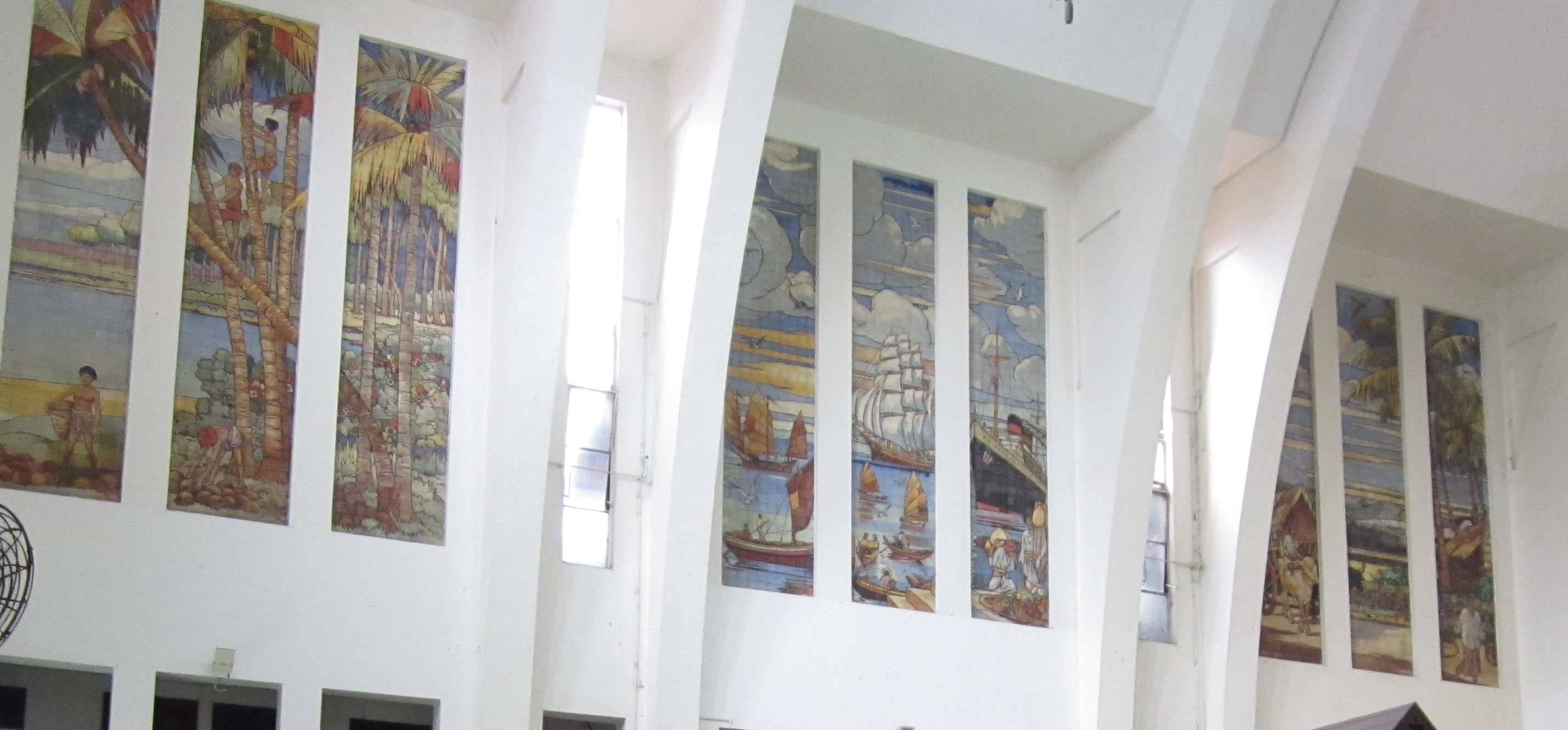
Panels of paintings depicting economic activities of Malaysia and Singapore in the Station hall

The building is in a richly ornamented Art Deco style. On its exterior are four reliefs of white marble, allegories of Agriculture, Industry, Commerce and Transport. They are works by Angiolo Vannetti, a sculptor from Florence, Italy.

The hall has a barrel vault roof.

Inside the main public hall, the walls bear panels with scenes depicting economic activities that were historically significant in Malaya: rice planting, rubber tapping, shipping activities, bullock cart transport, copra growing and tin mining.

These panels and the original floor slabs were manufactured locally, using rubber to deaden noise.

The two long platforms were capable of accommodating the longest mail trains, covered by umbrella reinforced concrete roofs.

== Facilities ==
In 1936, a convenience store, Habib Railway Book Store, was established inside the station. After the separation of Singapore from Malaysia in 1965, a money changer was set up beside it due to the splitting of currency. Both shops were owned by the same owner. The shop was closed in July 2011.

The upper floors of the station housed the Station Hotel and Prairie Express Pub, a pub and lounge since 1932. Both places are managed by Lim Jit Chin and his family. In 1992, Lim was acknowledged by the Guinness Book of Records as the second-longest serving hotel manager in the world. Since 1983, the hotel was in a legal tussle with the Malaysian government which wanted to evict the business. The hotel was closed in 1993 after losing its case against the Malaysian government.

The station platform was accessible to non-passengers at a fee of 20 cents to send off passengers. The platform was closed to non-passengers from 18 December 1988 as the platform was congested especially during festive seasons with very high passenger load.

== Disputes between Singapore and Malaysia ==
The status of the railway station was disputed between the governments of Malaysia and Singapore.

When Singapore left Malaysia in 1965, there was no border control between the two countries. When the two countries established border controls, both the Malaysian and Singaporean Customs, Immigration and Quarantine (CIQ) officers were stationed at Tanjong Pagar for clearance of railway passengers. Road travellers clear immigration at the Malaysian side of the Causeway and Woodlands, Singapore upon entry to Singapore. In this case, the CIQ of both countries are separated.

=== Malaysia–Singapore Points of Agreement of 1990 ===
In 1990, Malaysia and Singapore signed an agreement concerning Tanjong Pagar railway station. Malaysia agreed to relocate the station to Bukit Timah, thus freeing up land for development. In return, Singapore agreed that railway land at Tanjong Pagar would be handed over to a private limited company for joint development, with equity split 60% to Malaysia and 40% to Singapore. However, the parties interpreted the agreement in very different ways. Singapore insisted that the agreement took immediate effect but Malaysia argued that the agreement would come into effect only after it decided to move the station.

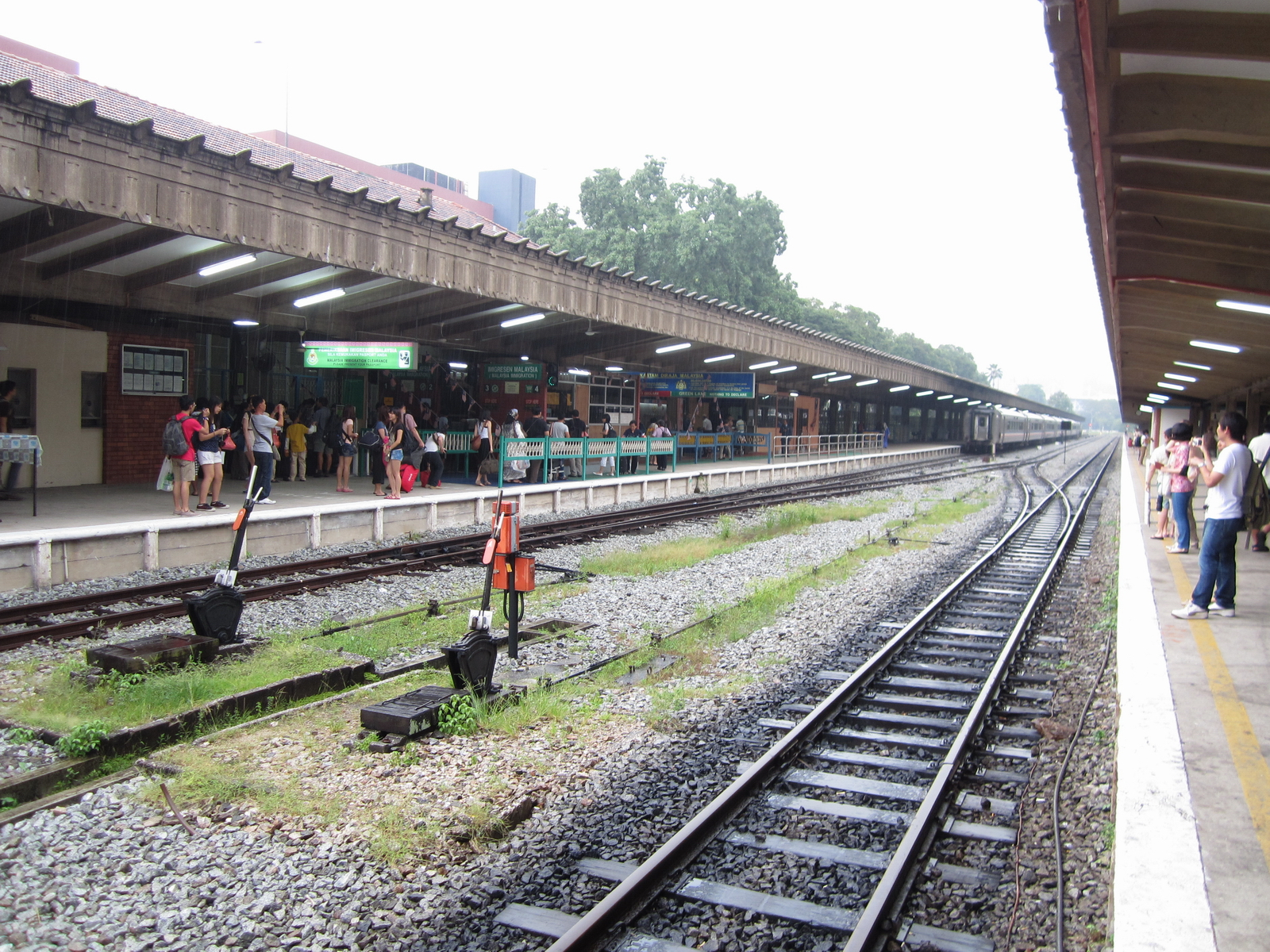
Platforms and lines at the Tanjong Pagar railway station, with passengers on the platform to the left clearing Malaysian immigration and customs formalities before boarding the northbound train for Malaysia. Photo taken on final month of operation.

=== Immigration control issues ===
Since 1992 KTM has worked with Singapore on re-aligning its railway tracks at Woodlands, where Singapore built a new immigration checkpoint to replace the old checkpoint, with facilities to carry out train passengers' immigration clearance instead of at Tanjong Pagar. In 1993, Malaysia responded that it would transfer its CIQ operations to the new Woodlands checkpoint.

However, in June 1997 Malaysia stated that the Malaysia-Singapore Points of Agreement of 1990 would come into effect only after it decided to relocate Tanjong Pagar station. Malaysia also informed Singapore that it had changed its mind and decided not to co-locate its CIQ with Singapore's at Woodlands Train Checkpoint (WTCP) but to remain at Tanjong Pagar. In April 1998, Singapore informed Malaysia that it would be moving its CIQ operations to Woodlands while Malaysia would have to move its CIQ out of Singapore from 1 August 1998. Malaysia requested, instead, that space be made available at the WTCP, as an interim arrangement, for Malaysian Immigration officials to operate from there and thereby overcome the problem of sequence of exit and entry stampings by Singapore and Malaysia immigration authorities.

According to a press release from the Ministry of Home Affairs of Singapore dated 24 July 1998:

- Singapore will allow Malaysian customs officials to operate at Tanjong Pagar railway station. Singapore officials will be present at Tanjong Pagar railway station to lend their authority to Malaysian customs officials during the interim period.
- Singapore has agreed to Malaysia's request to allow Malaysian Immigration to put some desks for its immigration officers on the passenger platform at WTCP to clear passengers after Singapore has cleared them for exit from Singapore. Singapore Immigration must clear departing passengers for exit from Singapore before Malaysian Immigration clears them for entry into Malaysia. Otherwise, the sequence of immigration clearance will be illogical and it will cause problems in crime investigation and prosecution. These interim arrangements will overcome the problems which would be caused if Malaysian Immigration were to remain in Tanjong Pagar railway station.

However, Malaysia refused to have its immigration clearance on the platform: it insisted that Malaysian Immigration should be inside the building at WTCP. If this was not possible, it said that Malaysian Immigration would remain at Tanjong Pagar. Singapore argued that Malaysia's decision to locate its Immigration Control Post in Singapore was not in compliance with Malaysia's own law. Under Malaysian law, it is Johor Bahru railway station, not Tanjong Pagar, that is gazetted as an Immigration Control Post for persons travelling by train from Singapore to Malaysia. Singapore also pointed out that this was confirmed by the endorsement on the passports of passengers boarding the train at Tanjong Pagar, which showed:

"MALAYSIA IMMIGRATION
JOHOR BAHRU
SOCIAL/BUSINESS VISIT PASS
Reg. 11. Imm. Regs 63
[Date]"
Permitted to enter and remain in West Malaysia and Sabah for one month from the date shown above"

On 1 August 1998, Singaporean Immigration ceased operations in Tanjong Pagar and moved to WTCP, while Malaysian Immigration continued operating in Tanjong Pagar. Malaysia decided not to endorse the passports of outgoing rail passengers from Singapore and promised to provide legal arguments to show that Malaysia's CIQ had the legal right to stay at Tanjong Pagar.

The immigration clearance procedure which resulted from the impasse until 1 July 2011 was:

- Towards Singapore, Malaysian immigration officers carried out immigration clearance on board the train at Johor Bahru railway station. After clearing immigration, the train crossed the causeway and stopped at WTCP, where all passengers proceeded to Singapore Customs and Immigration. Therefore, travellers entering Singapore by rail followed the correct order of immigration clearance, that is, exit granted by Malaysian Immigration in Johor and entry granted by Singapore Immigration in Woodlands. After clearing immigration at Woodlands, passengers could choose to leave the checkpoint or continue on the train to Tanjong Pagar.
- Towards Malaysia, passengers boarded the train at Tanjong Pagar and cleared Malaysian Customs and Immigration before boarding. The train travelled for about 30 minutes to WTCP and stopped there for 30 minutes for passengers to clear Singapore Immigration. In this case, passengers were granted entry into Malaysia before clearing Singapore Immigration, which is contrary to international practice. To circumvent this problem, Malaysian immigration officers did not stamp passports.

In early 2007, news of a Singaporean woman being jailed for failing to have her passport stamped when entering Malaysia threw the spotlight on the unusual clearance procedures. The Ministry of Foreign Affairs reminded Singaporeans that their passports would not be stamped when departing for Malaysia by train, instead stamping a disembarkation card, which had to be retained until departure from Malaysia. The entry records were also entered into a computer system. Even then, this arrangement continued to present problems for some commuters.

=== Relocation agreement ===
On 24 May 2010, a meeting between Malaysian Prime Minister Najib Razak and his Singaporean counterpart Lee Hsien Loong in Singapore resolved the relocation issue. In a joint statement after the meeting, they announced that KTM would move out of Tanjong Pagar railway station and establish a station at the Woodlands Train Checkpoint (WTCP), making it the southern terminus of the Malaysian rail network, from 1 July 2011. Malaysia would also relocate its customs, immigration and quarantine facilities from Tanjong Pagar to the WTCP, enabling an integrated border crossing facility between Malaysia and Singapore.

Singapore agreed to ensure a connecting bus service between WTCP and a nearby MRT station, and for the National Heritage Board to preserve the station building in any development of the area. Bukit Timah railway station building at Blackmore Drive can also be conserved.

Both sides agreed to create a consortium called M-S Pte Ltd, of which 60% equity is owned by Malaysia's Khazanah Nasional Berhad and 40% by Singapore's Temasek Holdings Ltd. The company will be vested with three parcels of land in Tanjong Pagar, Kranji and Woodlands and three additional pieces of land in Bukit Timah (Lot 76-2 Mk 16, Lot 249 Mk 4 and Lot 32-10 Mk 16) in exchange for the return of KTM railway land to Singapore, which was swapped with the Marina One and DUO plots of land, which is located at Marina Bay and Bugis areas in Singapore, in a bid to boost the financial growth in the central business district, and the nearest MRT stations to their M-S Pte Ltd ownage of the land are Marina Bay and Bugis.

Both sides also agreed to the building of a rapid transit link between Johor Bahru and Singapore to enhance connectivity across the Causeway. After the completion of the link, the KTM terminus may be relocated to Johor.

The last train out of Tanjong Pagar was driven by Sultan Ibrahim Iskandar, whose grandfather, Ismail of Johor, had opened the causeway between Singapore and Malaya in 1923. The Sultan had to learn how to drive a train before he was able to perform this task, receiving training from KTM. Two drivers accompanied him to ensure safety.

== See also ==
- Rail transport in Singapore
- Eastern & Oriental Express
- Malaysia–Singapore border
- Bukit Timah railway station
- Woodlands Train Checkpoint
