= Jurong railway line =

Former railway line in Singapore

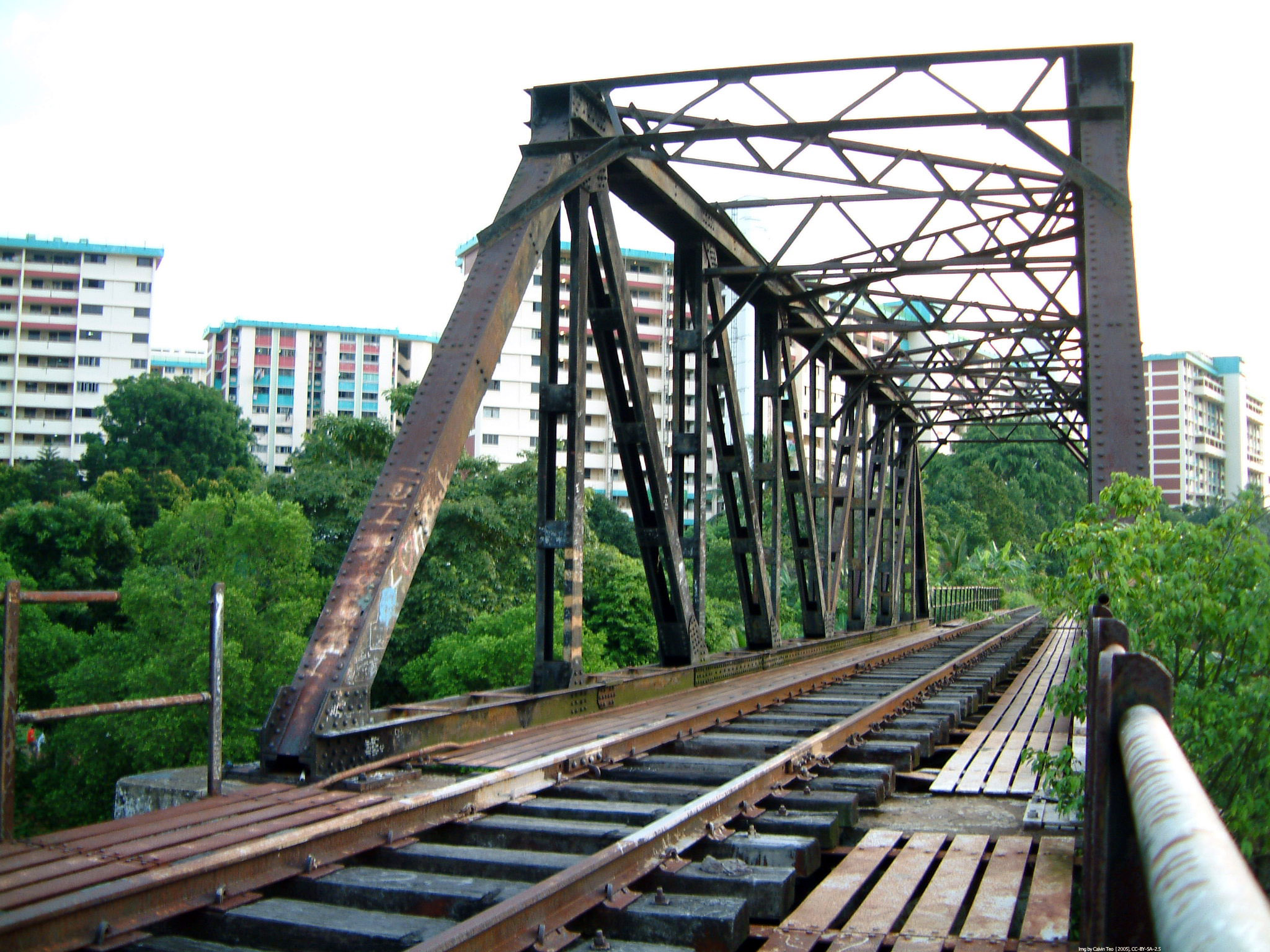
- Disused railway bridge on the defunct KTM Jurong Line

Overview
- Status: Closed
- Owner: Keretapi Tanah Melayu
- Locale: Singapore
- Termini: Bukit Timah; Jurong Port
- Stations: 3

Service
- Type: Freight rail
- Operator: Keretapi Tanah Melayu

History
- Work began: September 1963; 62 years ago
- Opened: 4 March 1966; 60 years ago
- Completed: November 1965; 60 years ago
- Closed: 1990s

Technical
- Line length: 12 mi (19 km)
- Track gauge: 1,000 mm (3 ft 3 3/8 in) metre gauge

The Jurong railway line is a former railway line located in Singapore. Stretching a total of 12 miles (19 km) from Bukit Timah to the Jurong industrial estate, the line consisted of a 9 miles (14 km) main line and three branches. The line was initially planned as part of the Jurong industrial estate by the Singapore government, to connect the industrial estate with Malaya and to facilitate the transfer of goods between Malaya and Jurong. A $6 million loan was given to the Malayan Railway for its construction, which was carried out by the railway and the Economic Development Board, and construction of the line took place between September 1963 and November 1965, with the first train services commencing in the same month. The line was then officially opened on 4 March 1966. However, the line's potential was limited by Singapore's separation from Malaysia in 1965, with 128,000 tons of freight transported on the line in 1974, and the line eventually closed in the 1990s. Portions of the line remain in place, some of which have become popular among explorers and wildlife enthusiasts.

== Route ==
The Jurong railway line ran between Bukit Timah and the Jurong industrial estate. It consisted of a 9 miles (14 km) main line between Bukit Timah and the Mobil refinery in the industrial estate, and three branch lines, which connected the main line to the heavy industries area, the docks and to the National Iron and Steel Mills respectively, with the total length of the line and its branches being 12 miles (19 km).

From Bukit Timah, the main line ran under Clementi Road through a tunnel. It then ran westward across Sunset Way and the Sungei Ulu Pandan before running along Upper Ayer Rajah Road and Jalan Ahmad Ibrahim, and then ran across a causeway before passing through the heavy industrial and port areas of the Jurong industrial estate. The line had three tunnels, eight bridges and 22 culverts along its route.

=== Key locations ===
| Point | Coordinates (links to map & photo sources) | Notes |
|---|---|---|
| Start | 1.32995°N 103.78125°E | near Bukit Timah railway station |
| Midpoint | 1.32629°N 103.73326°E | approximate |
| End (Shipyard Rd) | 1.30372°N 103.68800°E | serving Mobil refinery, National Iron and Steel Mills |
| End (Jurong Port Branch) | 1.30920°N 103.71639°E | |
| End (Jalan Tepong) | 1.30884°N 103.72172°E | serving Central Abbatoirs, Jurong Fishing Port and Central Fish Market |

== History ==
=== Background and construction ===
The line was initially planned as part of the development of a new industrial area in Jurong, in order to link the Jurong industrial area with northern Singapore and Malaya, and was first announced in July 1960. The line was to stretch 8 miles (13 km) from the Jurong port to Bukit Timah station, and the Singapore government intended the line to be utilised for the movement of raw materials into Jurong from Malaya, and to transport goods out of Jurong back into Malaya. For the construction of the line, the Economic Development Board of Singapore provided the Malayan Railway a loan of nearly $6 million, which was to be repaid with the tonnage moved over the line.

Construction on the line began in September 1963. The bridges, tunnels and culverts along the line were constructed by the Economic Development Board, and tracklaying was done by the Malayan Railway. A marshalling yard with six tracks, a small railway station at Jalan Ahmad Ibrahim, along with a godown that housed a goods shed and customs office were also constructed. In total, around 1,000,000 cubic yards (760,000 m^{3}) of earth was moved. At a cost of $5 million and stretching 12 miles (19 km), the line was completed and opened for rail service in November 1965, with initial services consisting of a cement clinker train from Perak. The three branches on the line were then opened in January 1966. The line was officially opened on 4 March 1966. At the line's opening, the Malayan Railway stated that it expected yearly rail traffic on the line to be at least 400,000 tons, and to bring in a yearly revenue of $3 to $4 million.

=== Operational years ===
In September 1967, as part of a westward expansion of the Jurong industrial estate, a 3.5 miles (5.6 km) extension of the line westward was proposed. With traffic congestion on roads into Jurong, in 1969, the Automobile Association of Singapore suggested that the line be used for passenger service in and out of the industrial estate.

With the separation of Singapore from Malaysia, the ability of the Jurong line to serve the Malaysian market was limited. In 1974, the line handled 128,000 tons of freight. By the late 1970s, the Malaysian government had announced proposals to stop train services into Singapore, with a rail connection to the Pasir Gudang port in its place. The line was eventually closed in the mid-1990s.

== Remaining infrastructure ==
After the line's closure, portions of the line were dismantled or demolished, while other sections remain in place. The intact sections include a tunnel under Clementi Road, and bridges across the Sungei Ulu Pandan and Sunset Way. In several areas, the line has become overgrown with vegetation. The abandoned rail infrastructure along the line has also attracted nature enthusiasts and explorers.

In July 2021, the National Parks Board announced plans to convert 4 km (2.5 miles) of the line into a nature trail. Termed as the Old Jurong Line Nature Trail, the trail was expected to be opened from 2024.

However, in an update shared on 31 August 2024, National Development Minister Desmond Lee shared that restoration of the former railway will be done in phases, with work on the first phase to begin in early-2025. He also shared that the trail will be opened progressively from end-2026.
