= Track gauge in Singapore =

In Singapore, the main lines on the Mass Rapid Transit system use the 1,435 mm (4 ft 8 1/2 in) standard gauge.

The KTM trains running from Malaysia to Woodlands Train Checkpoint, and formerly to Tanjong Pagar railway station, uses the 1,000 mm (3 ft 3 3/8 in) metre gauge.

== Standard gauge ==
Singapore's Mass Rapid Transit system uses the 1,435 mm (4 ft 8 1/2 in) standard gauge since the system was first constructed. Its metro lines all use the same standard gauge throughout the network. Its current metro lines using the gauge are the North–South Line, East–West Line, Circle Line, Thomson–East Coast Line, Downtown Line and North East Line. Future lines using the gauge are the Jurong Region Line and Cross Island Line.

== Other gauge ==
=== Metre gauge ===
The former KTM Intercity that ran from the former Tanjong Pagar Railway station to Johor Bahru used the 1,000 mm (3 ft 3 3/8 in) metre gauge. The tracks and depot of the line have been since removed when the service was withdrawn from 1 July 2011. The service now terminated at Woodlands Train Checkpoint, and currently only a shuttle service is run from Johor Bahru Sentral railway station to Woodlands Train Checkpoint.

=== Non-gauged railways ===
The current Sengkang LRT and Punggol LRTs on the Light Rail Transit as well as the Changi Airport Skytrain do not have a traditional track gauge or rails. Rather, they use rubber tires on the Crystal Mover guided by rails on the sides, essentially a sort of hybrid between a driverless traditional electric multiple unit and a trolleybus.

The Bukit Panjang LRT uses the Bombardier Innovia APM 100 which also uses rubber tires, but instead uses a center third rail to guide and receive power.

=== Other ===
The current Sentosa Express is a monorail line not part of the MRT or LRT systems and uses a straddle-beam monorail system by Hitachi Rail, using their small-type monorail.
