= Hitachi small-type monorail (Sentosa Express) =

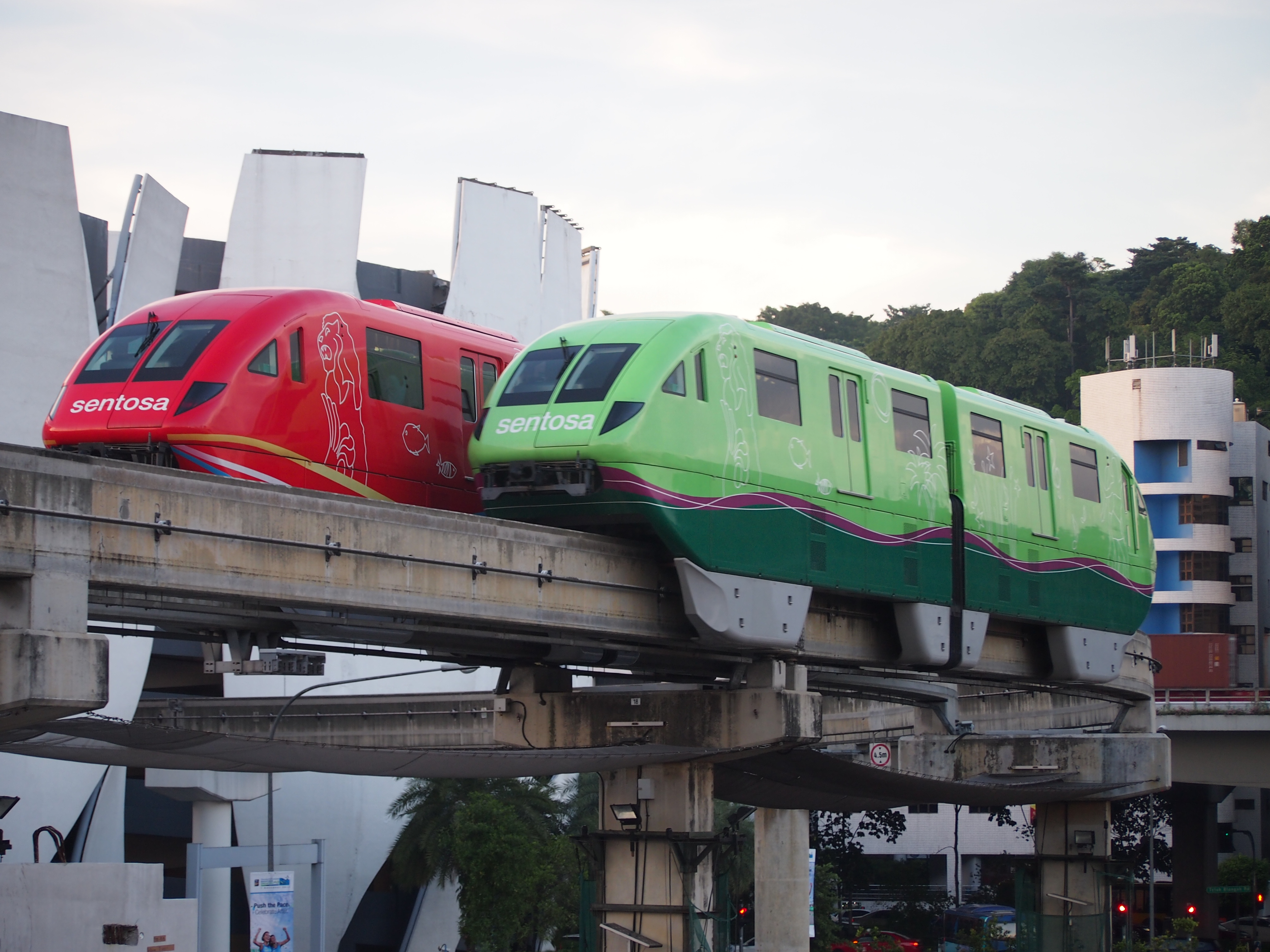
- Two SDC Hitachi monorails outside VivoCity

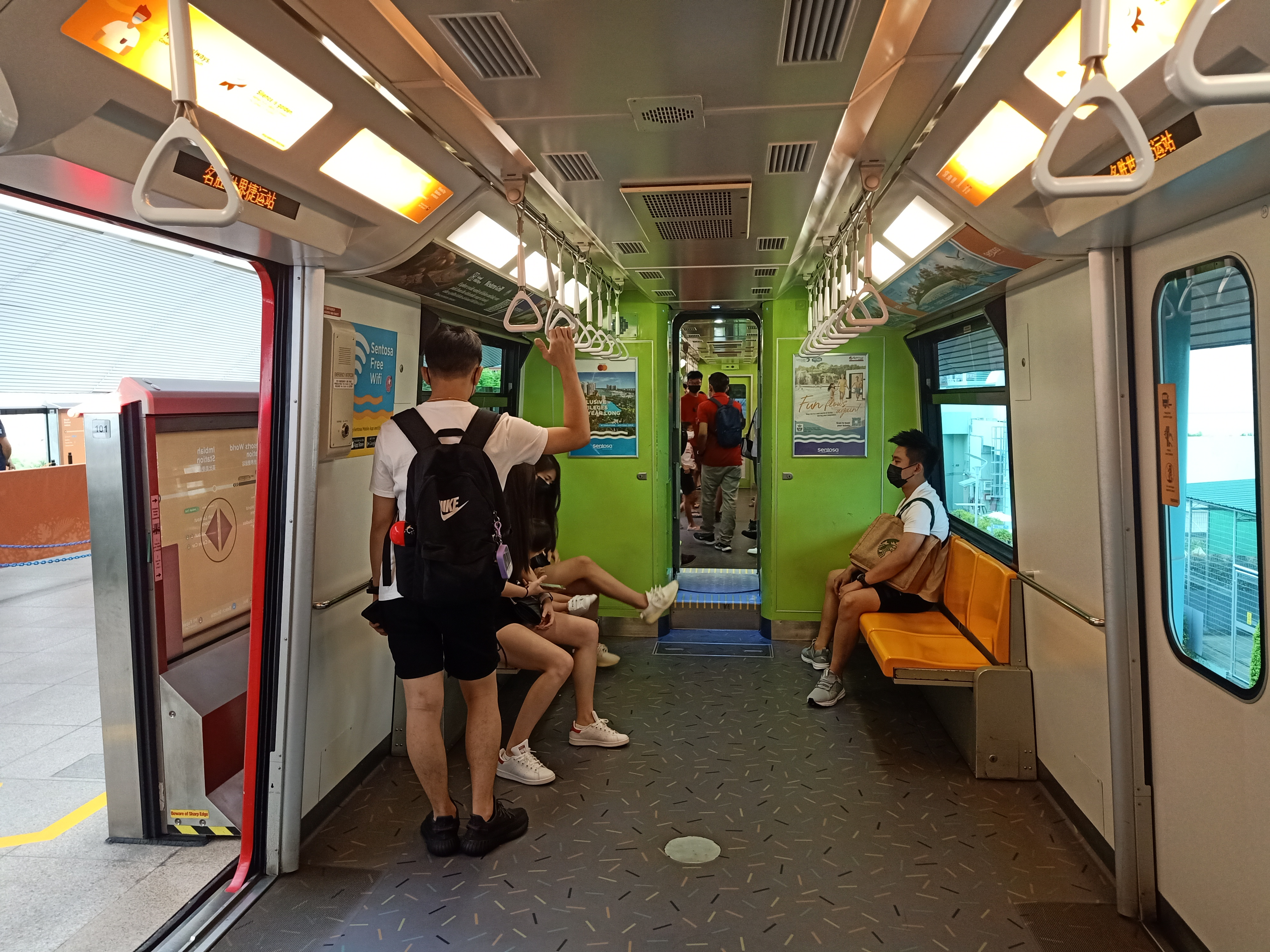
- Interior of the Sentosa Express Hitachi monorail
- Stock type: Straddle-beam guideway
- In service: 15 January 2007; 19 years ago – present
- Manufacturer: Hitachi Rail
- Built at: Kasado Works, Kudamatsu, Japan
- Family name: Hitachi Monorail
- Replaced: Sentosa Monorail
- Constructed: 2005–2009, 2017
- Entered service: 15 January 2007
- Number built: 14 vehicles (7 train sets)
- Number in service: 14 vehicles (7 train sets)
- Formation: 2 cars per trainset Mc1–Tc2
- Capacity: 32 seated; 152 standing
- Operator: SMRT Corporation under their subsidiary Strides
- Depot: Beach Station Depot
- Line served: Sentosa Express

Specifications
- Car body construction: Welded aluminium
- Train length: 25 m (82 ft 1/4 in)
- Car length: 13 m (42 ft 7 13/16 in) (Mc1); 12 m (39 ft 4 7/16 in) (Tc2)
- Width: 2.7 m (8 ft 10 5/16 in)
- Height: 2 m (6 ft 6 3/4 in)
- Doors: 2 per car, sliding
- Maximum speed: 80 km/h (50 mph) (design); 50 km/h (31 mph) (service)
- Traction system: Hitachi IGBT–VVVF
- Electric systems: 750 V DC third rail
- Current collection: Collector shoe
- UIC classification: Bo′Bo′+2′2′
- Safety systems: Original: Fixed block Hitachi digital ATP/ATS for GoA 1; Current: Moving block Hitachi wireless CBTC with subsystems of ATC, ATO under GoA 3 (DTO), ATP, ATS and CBI
- Coupling system: Shibata rotary
- Track gauge: Straddle-beam

The Hitachi small-type monorail is a straddle-type monorail built by Hitachi Rail for the use on the Sentosa Express. These trains are part of Hitachi Monorail line of ALWEG-based monorail. The trains were part of a project to replace Sentosa's previous aging monorail system. The trains are fully air-conditioned.

== Operations and safety systems ==
Trains and platform screen doors were previously manually operated by train attendants; the trains utilised digital automatic train protection (ATP) to ensure trains keep a safe distance between each other and automatic train supervision (ATS) to provide the route setting for the train to travel.

With the upgrading to the wireless communications-based train control (CBTC) system in 2017, trains and platform screen doors are now operated automatically.

These trains are designed to have a maximum speed of 80km/h (50 mph), but they usually cruise at 15 to 50 km/h (9.3 to 31.1 mph).

== Refurbishment and upgrades ==
The Vacuum Fluorescent Display (VFD) has been changed to a newer updated LED Displays with route information.

A signalling system upgrade was also upgraded to Communications-Based Train Control (CBTC). With the change in Signalling System, it allowed more trains to run on the network.

== See also ==
- Hitachi Monorail
- Sentosa island
- Rail transport in Singapore
- Sentosa Monorail – a monorail system that used to ferry visitors around Sentosa from its introduction in 1982 to its dismantling in 2005
