= Rail transport in Singapore =

Singapore
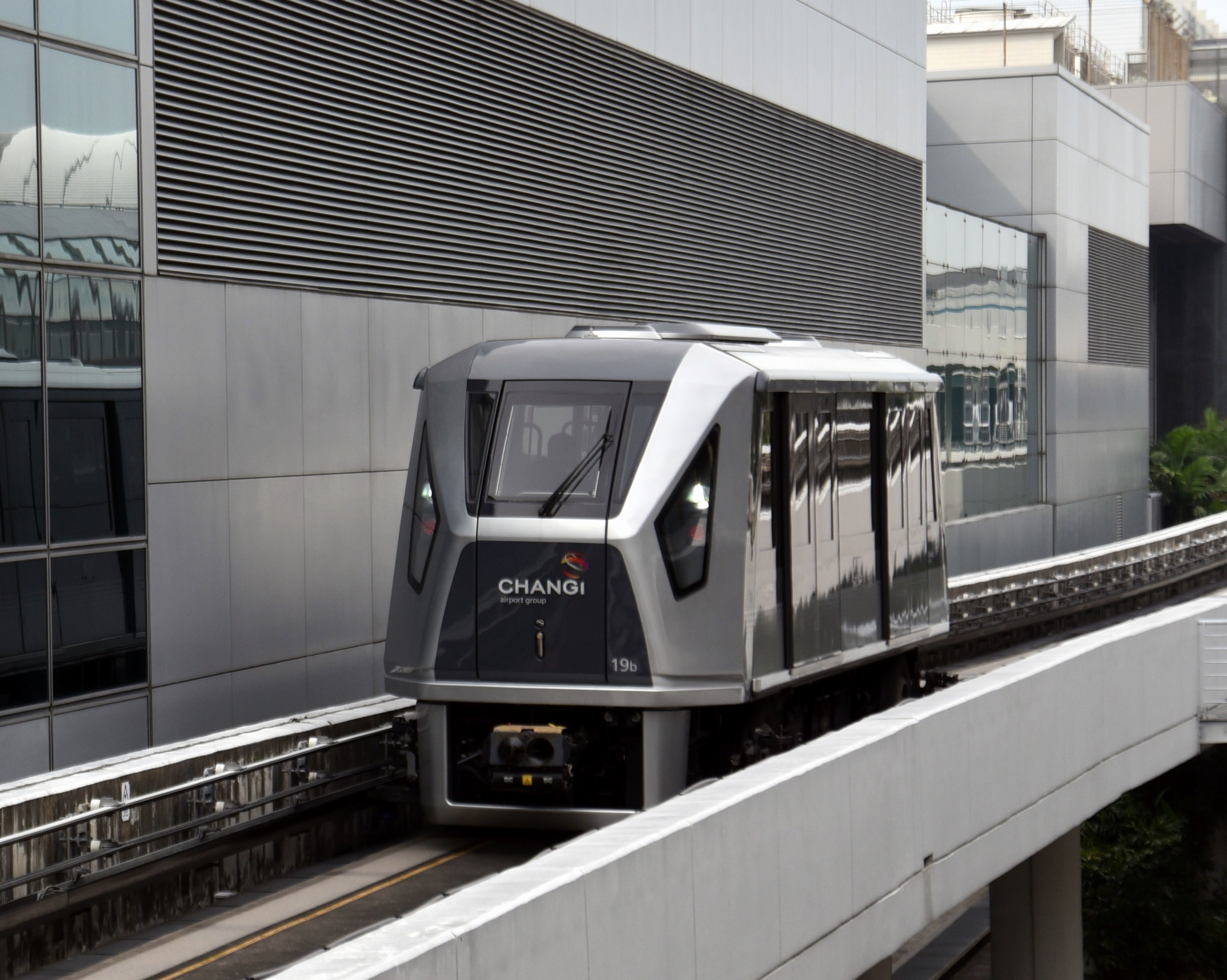
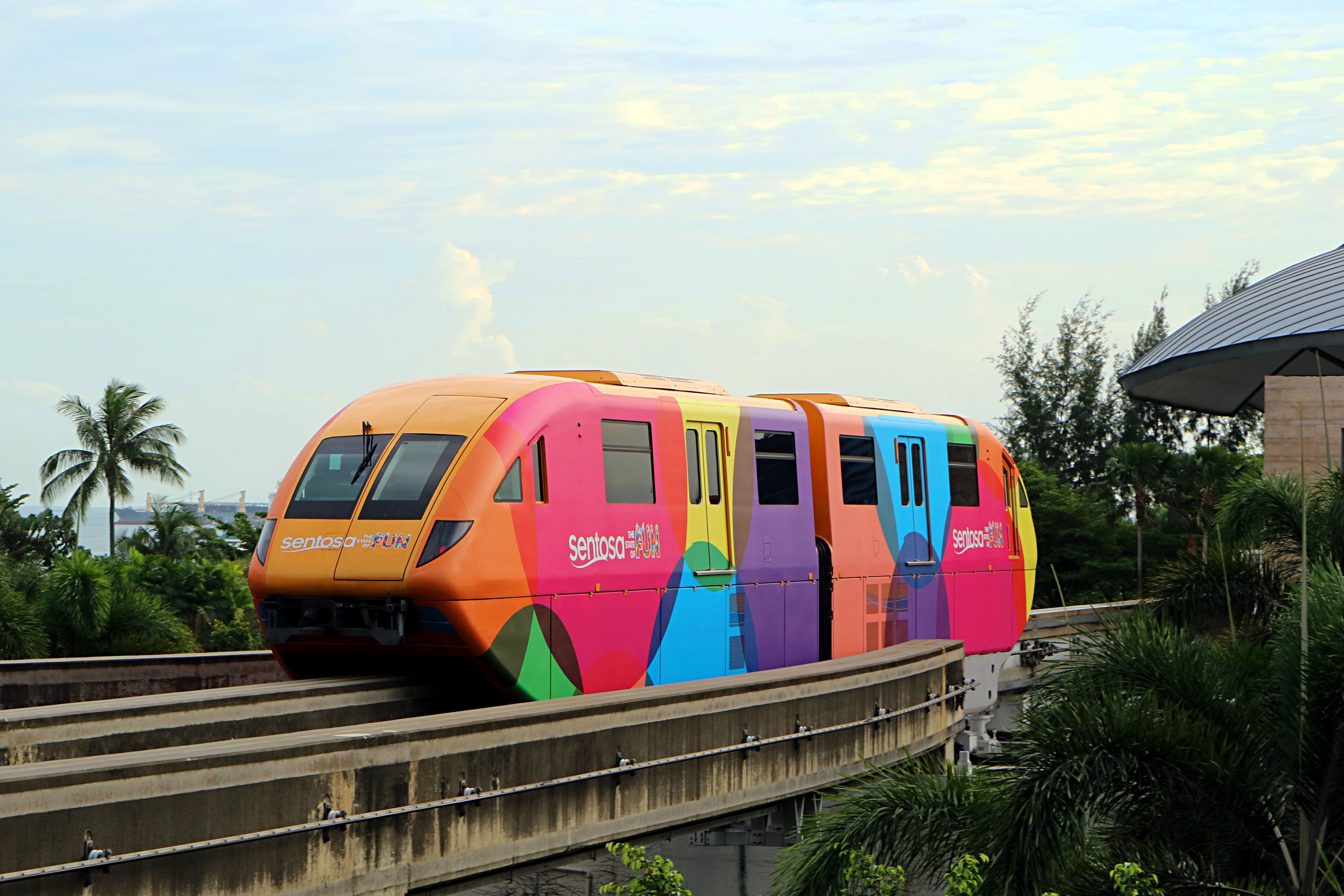
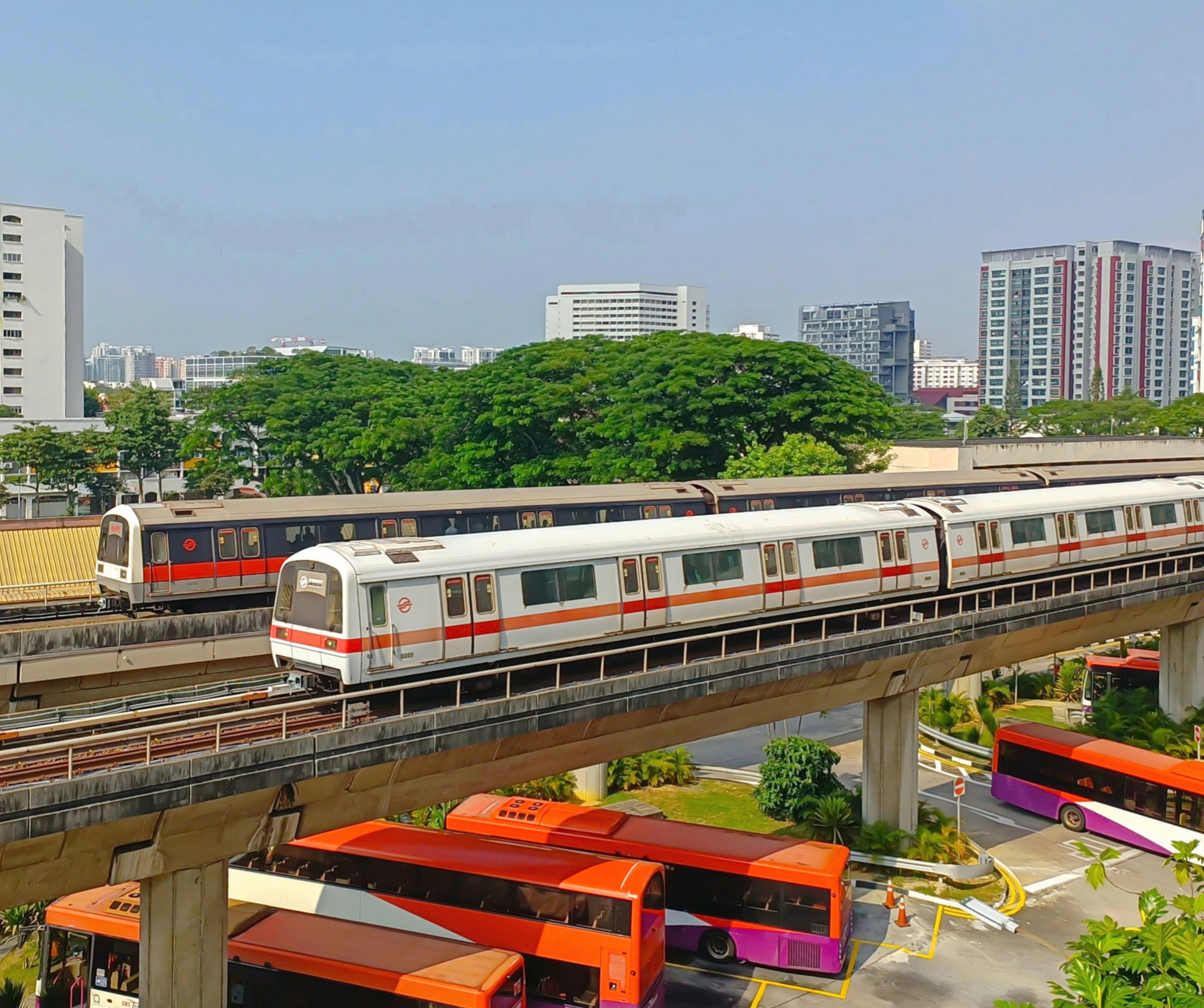
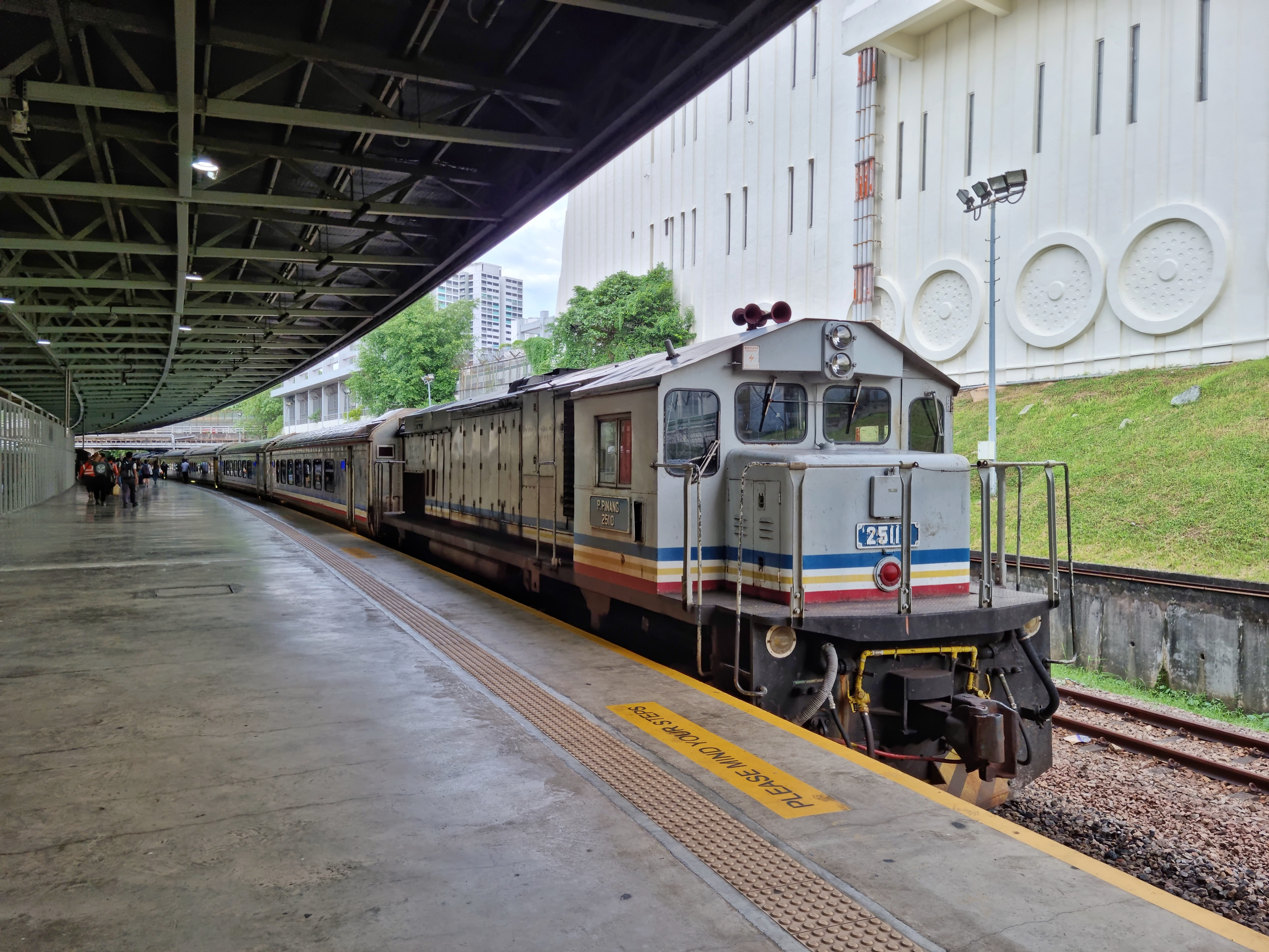
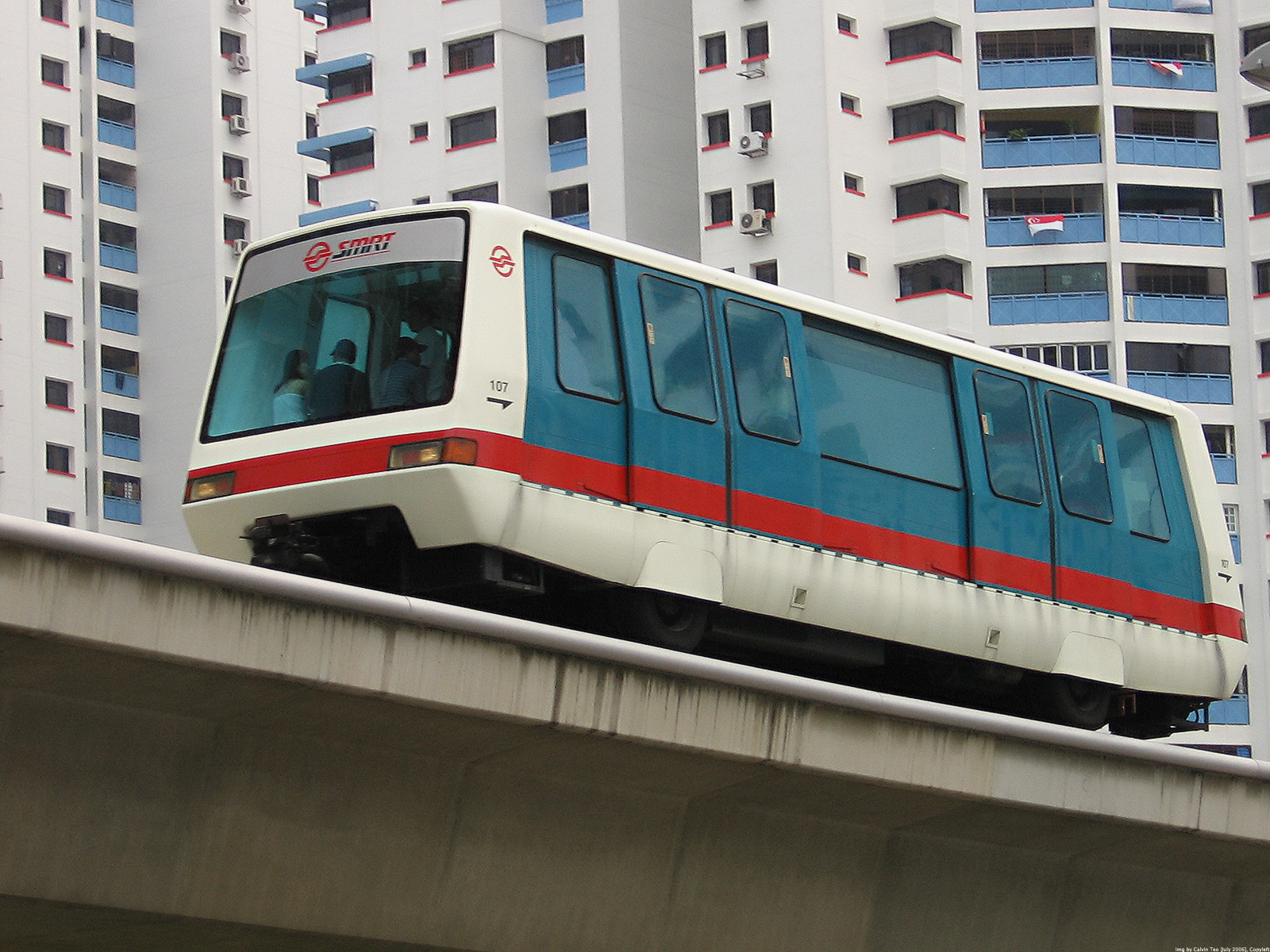
- From top, left to right: A Changi Airport Light Rail Crystal Mover set, A Sentosa Express train in the 'State of Fun livery', two trains on the East-West MRT line at Eunos MRT station, a KTM Intercity train loading passengers at Woodlands Train Checkpoint, and a Bukit Panjang LRT train passing through the estate.

Operation
- Infrastructure company: MRT and LRT: Land Transport Authority
- Major operators: MRT and LRT: SMRT Trains, SBS Transit; International railway: Keretapi Tanah Melayu, Belmond Limited; Other: Changi Airport Group

Statistics
- Ridership: MRT and LRT: 3.7 million per day (2025); KTM Intercity: An average of 8,635 per day (2023)

System length
- Total: MRT and LRT: 271.3 kilometres (168.6 mi); Changi Airport Skytrain: 6.4 kilometres (4.0 mi); Sentosa Express: 2.1 kilometres (1.3 mi)
- Electrified: 279.8 km (173.9 mi) (2025)

Track gauge
- Main: KTM: 1,000 mm (3 ft 3 3/8 in), MRT: 1,435 mm (4 ft 8 1/2 in)

Rail transport in Singapore mainly consists of a passenger urban rail transit system spanning the entire city-state: a rapid transit system collectively known as the Mass Rapid Transit (MRT) system operated by the two biggest public transport operators SMRT Trains (SMRT Corporation) and SBS Transit, as well as several Light Rail Transit (LRT) rubber-tyred automated guideway transit lines also operated by both companies. In addition, local specialised light rail lines are in operation in places such as the Singapore Changi Airport and Sentosa.

A short remaining section of the railway originally built during the British colonial period is connected to the Malaysian rail network, and is operated by the Malaysian railway company Keretapi Tanah Melayu (KTM). The Singapore section of the railway now serves only inter-city passenger services; until 2011 the railway also carried freight between Malaysia and the Port of Singapore at Tanjong Pagar.

Two international rail links to Malaysia have been proposed to replace the KTM railway. The Johor Bahru–Singapore Rapid Transit System is currently under construction and is scheduled to begin operations in January 2027. The Kuala Lumpur–Singapore High Speed Rail was planned but shelved in January 2021 until 2023, which both Malaysia and Singapore decided to revisit the project and the project was then under request for approval as of 2025.

Although Singapore is not a member of the International Union of Railways (UIC) given the nature of Singapore as a city-state and its lack of a national railway proper, SMRT Corporation, SBS Transit and the Land Transport Authority are members of the International Association of Public Transport (UITP). SMRT Corporation is also a member of the Community of Metros (CoMET) benchmarking group. In addition, Keretapi Tanah Melayu, the Malaysian train operator that operate Shuttle Tebrau services in Singapore is a member of UIC.

== History ==
=== Early railways in the 19th century ===
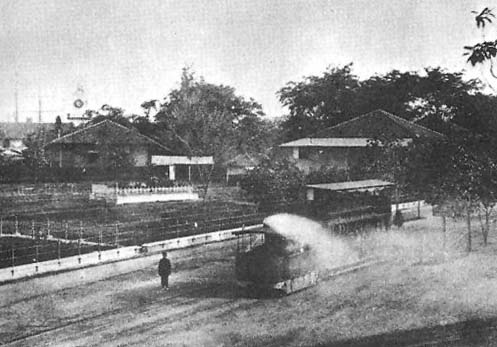
A steam tram as used in 1880s Singapore

The first railway in Singapore was a steam railway dating back to 1877 that was used by the Tanjong Pagar Dock Company to "aid the labour of unloading vessels"; this railway ran along the mile-long wharf was served using 0-4-0ST shunters supplied by Dick & Stevenson.

The foundations for the first tramway in Singapore were first laid in 1882 with the formation of the London-based Singapore Tramway Company following an approval under the 1882 Tramways Ordinance to construct five steam tramway lines across Singapore Town. On 8 December 1883, the Singapore Tramway Company launched a prospectus to construct and build tramways for the transport of passengers and goods in Singapore. The first rails were laid on 7 April 1885, and the first regular service from Tanjong Pagar to Johnston's Pier began on 3 May 1886. The tramway was operated using 16 (initially 14) 0-4-0ST steam tram engines from Kitson and Company and double-deck passenger trailer cars. However, the tramway proved to not be competitive against other modes of transport like the rickshaws and was discontinued in 1894.

The first electric railways in Singapore began in 1891 as a 180 feet-long demonstration line built along New Harbour (present-day Keppel Harbour) by Charles Buckley with anticipation that an electric tramway between the Town and Kranji be built eventually. Several distinguished figures, including the Sultan of Johore were invited to witness the experiment and the Sultan rode on a makeshift tramcar up and down the line. This was followed by the Kranji Electric Line built near the residence of the Johore Sultan in 1892. Despite initial positive reception on the opening of the Line, little materialised out of the demonstrations.

=== Singapore–Kranji Railway, 1900s ===
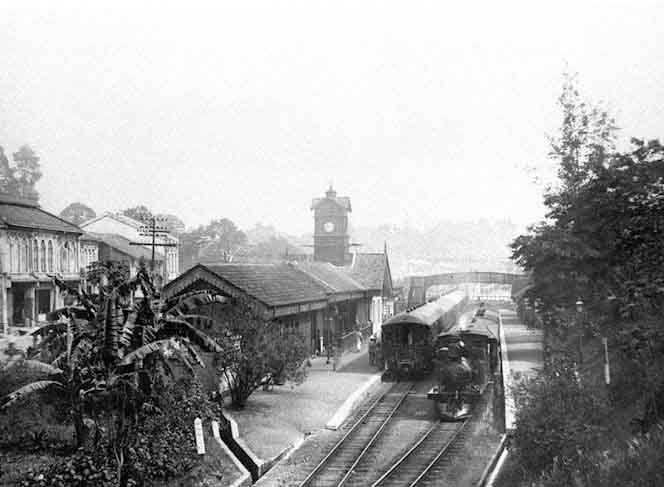
Tank Road station, the original town terminus of the Singapore Government Railway

Plans to build a railway line through Singapore, primarily to service the New Harbour had been mooted as early as 1869 by Engineer W. J. du Port of the Tanjong Pagar Dock Company but the project to build a railway line was only approved by Governor Charles Bullen Hugh Mitchell only in 1899 after then Governor Cecil Clementi Smith raised the need for it in an 1889 Legislative Council meeting. Construction works were then initiated, with the groundbreaking ceremony held on 16 April 1900. Chinese labour was employed principally.

C. E. Spooner, general manager of the Federated Malay States Railway (FMSR), was appointed the supervisor of the project. At a total cost of $1,967,495, the Singapore–Kranji Railway (also known as the Singapore Government Railway), running from Singapore to Kranji, was completed in 1903. The first section was launched on 1 January 1903. It stretched from Singapore station at Tank Road to Bukit Timah and consisted of four stations along the line: Singapore, Newton, Cluny and Bukit Timah. According to a newspaper report the following day, “a total of 557½ passengers were carried” on the opening day. The second section, which extended the line to Woodlands, was completed three months later when the Woodlands station was opened on 10 April 1903. In 1903, there were a total of 426,044 passengers. By 1905, this had increased to 525,553. Soon after, work began on the extension of the railway line from a point near Tank Road where a new through station was built in 1906/7 to the wharves at Pasir Panjang. The extension was completed and opened on 21 January 1907. With the extension, the stations along the line were Woodlands, Bukit Panjang, Bukit Timah, Holland, Cluny, Newton, Tank Road, Borneo Wharf and Pasir Panjang. People's Park and Mandai were later added as infill stations.

Rolling stock-wise, the railway initially used four 4-4-0 steam locomotives from Hunslet Engine Company and in 1907, acquired another two of such engines.

The Singapore–Kranji Railway initially ran nine trains every day: six through-trains between Woodlands and Tank Road and three trains stopping at Bukit Timah. The last train of the day left Tank Road for Bukit Timah at 6.40 pm. By 1904, there were eight runs per day with all trains running between Tank Road and Woodlands. At a speed of 16 to 29 km/h, trains now took 54 to 55 minutes to reach Woodlands from the Town as opposed to two hours on other transport modes like the bullock cart, horse carriage or rickshaw.

=== Return of the tramway, 1905-1926 ===
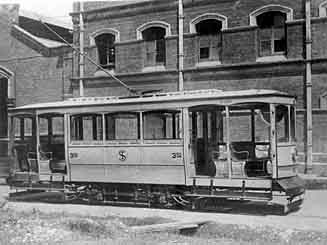
Singapore Traction Company (STC) took over the fledging tramway network in 1925. A third-class tram as operated by STC circa mid-1920s

Meanwhile, tramways were experiencing a construction boom across many urban areas following improvements for electric tramways by Frank J. Sprague in 1888. With high hopes of exporting the electric tram beyond domestic markets, Singapore Tramways Ltd was established in 1901 to build an electric tramway for Singapore. The Tramways Ordinance of 1902 was subsequently enacted, granting rights to the company to build and run a tramway in Singapore.

Five lines, which both ran along the original steam tram alignment and extended beyond the original steam tram network, were planned but another line running between High Street and Orchard Road and a connecting line to a depot at Mackenzie Road were also built. In 1905, a power station was built to provide electricity supply for the overhead lines of the tramway; the same station also powered the electric street lighting of the municipality.

The electric tramway was to operate both passenger services and freight services. To this extent a variety of rolling stock was acquired from the United Electric Car Company, namely cross-bench tramcars and "Californian" tramcars for passenger services and freight motors, open wagons and vans for freight transport.

On 29 March 1905, the Singapore Tramways was officially acquired by the Singapore Electric Tramways Limited. The electric tramways opened to public on 24 July 1905 to little fanfare. Run-ins with bullock carts and rickshaw drivers as well as vandals troubled the electric tram operations. The growth of the island's commerce provided the impetus for increased hauls, which included passengers, though human traffic on the trams saw slow growth. The competition from rickshaws remained stiff. Nonetheless, the reduction in tram fares increased ridership to 32,000 in 1909; at the end of that year, the company was in the black – albeit with an ultra-modest profit of £134.26.

The tram operators faced the strain of having to replace the tracks and maintain the generators. By 1913, all the tracks required replacement and the generators were worked to full capacity. The outbreak of the First World War restricted the overhauling efforts; by 1921, Singapore Electric Tramways was making losses of £50,000 annually. It sought professional advice from the successful Shanghai Electric Construction Company, and then undertook a complete rehabilitation in a last-ditch effort to keep the system alive. The trams were rebuilt and the fare scales revised. Fares for short-distance travellers (less than approximately 2.4 km) were reduced and the result was dramatic. There was a 235-percent increase in ridership and revenues increased by 95 percent. Singapore Electric Tramways saw a profit of £23,000 in 1923.28.

Just as the system started becoming viable, however, the municipal commissioners refused to extend tramway concessions. They cited incompatibility of the parties’ interests over the state of the roads on which the trams ran and were embarrassed that the reconstructed tracks ran on fine, metalled surface while the outside lanes were battered.

On 1 October 1925, the electric tramways was taken over by the Singapore Traction Company (STC), which was tasked to convert from trams to trolley buses. The last trams ran on the streets in 1927.

=== Subsequent developments, 1910-1941 ===
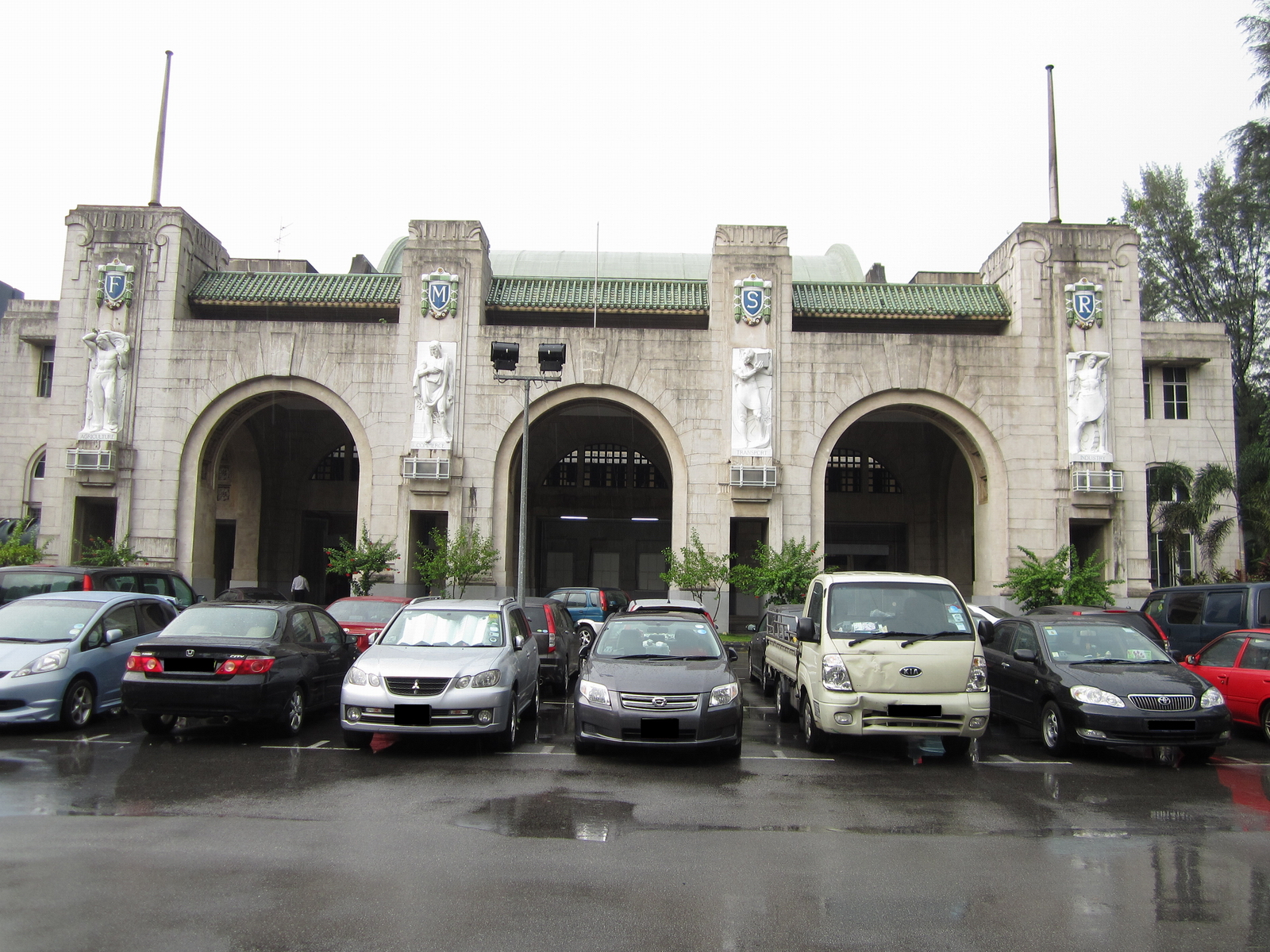
Tanjong Pagar served as the railway terminus from 1932 to 2011.

In 1904, the Sultan of Johore signed off a 194 km line between Gemas and Johor Bahru which was completed in 1909. There was now an almost continuous rail link between Singapore and Penang excluding the crossing of the Straits of Johor, which was served using two boats named Singapore and Johore. In 1913, the Singapore-Kranji Railway was sold off to FMSR at a price of $4.136 million in anticipation of eventual connections between the two railways. This connection was finally fulfilled in 1923 with the opening of the Causeway.

From 1929 to 1932, the portion of the railway between Bukit Timah and Pasir Panjang was deviated from its original alignment to a new route running through Tanglin and Alexandra to Tanjong Pagar to eliminate the level crossings along the original alignment.

==== Military railways, 1920s-1930s ====
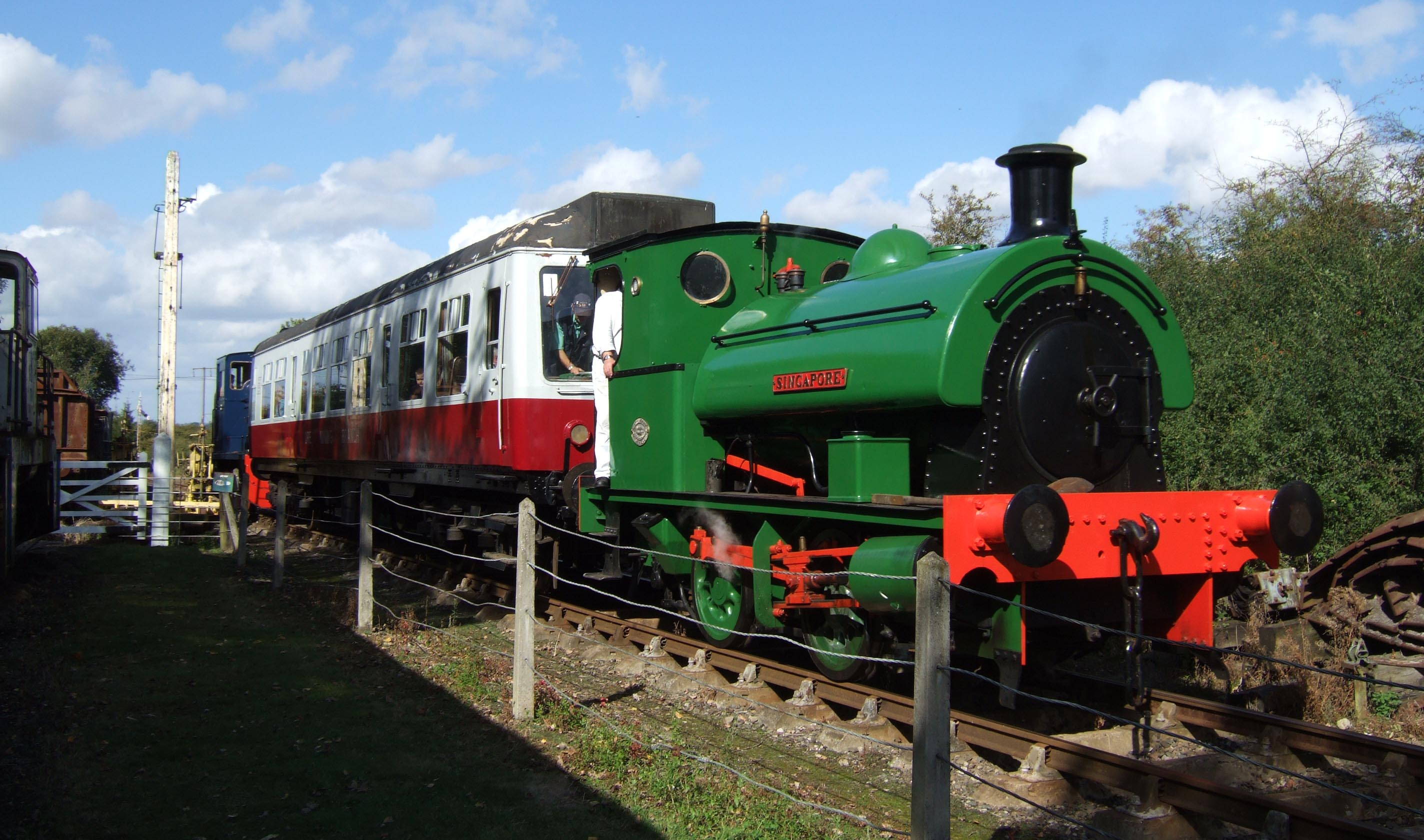
Hawthorn Leslie 0-4-0ST 3865 "Singapore"

The Admiralty Military Railway was a line that branched off the main line near Woodlands and was built in the 1930s to serve the Naval Shipyard at Sembawang. Three of the locomotives were 0-6-0Ts built by Hunslet in 1929 and numbered SL18-20. In November 1941 they were transferred to the FMSR as the second Class A, later becoming 331 class before being sold to the Port Of Singapore in 1946. In addition to the metre gauge line there was a standard gauge system and two of the locomotives which operated this system were returned to the UK in 1955. One of these, Hawthorn Leslie 3865 of 1936, an 0-4-0ST named "Singapore", has been preserved.

The Changi Military Railway was a 4-mile long standard gauge line built by the FMSR for the War Department, for the protection of Singapore's new Naval Base at Sembawang. The fortifications for the Naval Base were laid at the entrance to the Old Strait, at Changi, where one 15-inch gun, one 9-inch battery, one 6-inch battery and search lights were installed. The artillery installations were supplied with underground ammunition depots and loaded with armour piercing shells. On the beach, concrete machine emplacements and wire were installed. Airfields in Sembawang, Seletar and Tengah were to provide air cover for the Base. Bagnalls of Stafford supplied an 0-6-0ST, number 2547 of 6/1936, to the War Office department, Changi, Singapore. It had 16" x 22" cylinders and 3' 4" driving wheels. It was last seen derelict in 1947 but its fate is unknown. The railway ran from Fairy Point pier to the battery with a short branch to a depot.

=== Post-war developments, 1950s-1995 ===
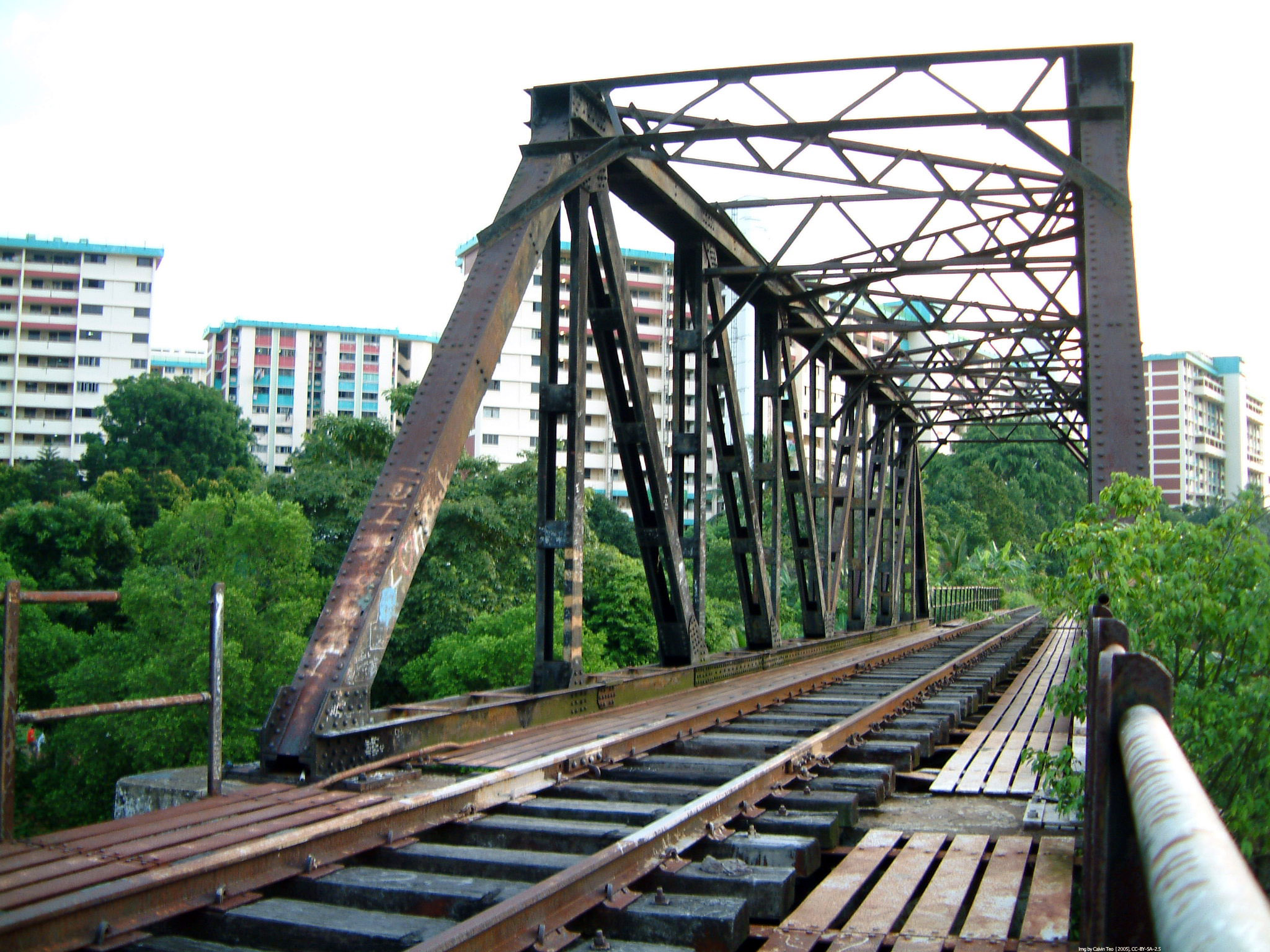
Disused railway bridge in the defunct KTM Jurong Line.

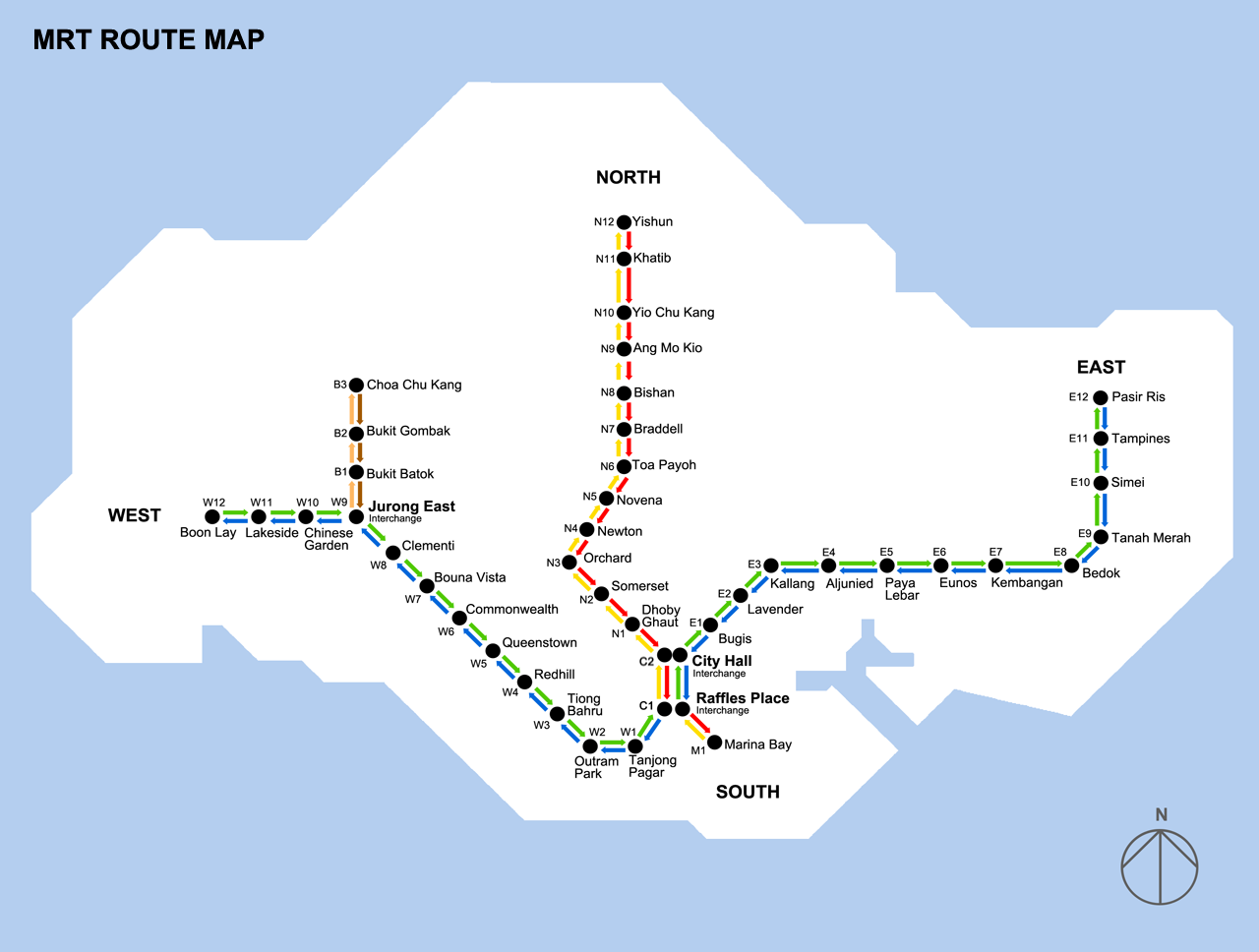
A map of the initial MRT system used from 1987–1996

By the time the Second World War ended in 1945, the FMSR was still operating six stations along the line: Tanjong Pagar, Tanglin Halt, Bukit Timah, Bukit Panjang, Kranji and Woodlands. In 1946, the FMSR closed Tanglin Halt, Bukit Panjang and Kranji to allow for faster travel between Woodlands and Tanjong Pagar. Meanwhile, FMSR was renamed as Malayan Railways in 1948 after the formation of the Federation of Malaya; in 1962 it was renamed again as Keretapi Tanah Melayu (KTM).

In 1953, a proposal was made to convert the existing Malayan Railway line into a double-tracked electrified light rail transit system to resolve the congestion problem; diesel railcars could be used should this not be economic. Nothing materialised out of the proposal however. When STC bus drivers went on strike in 1956, a local supplementary train service had to be provided by the Malayan Railways to provide relief for commuters affected by the strike.

In 1961 the Singapore Harbour Board had 16 miles of tracks in its 950-acre site, which were connected to the main line west of Tanjong Pagar station. By the 1970s it had been renamed to the Port of Singapore Authority and owned a number of diesel shunters.

Following full internal self-governance of Singapore in 1959, the new government under the People's Action Party pursued an aggressive industrialisation policy to resolve unemployment problems, one of which included building Jurong Industrial Estate in 1960. Keen on tapping the economic hinterland of Malaya, a freight-only Jurong line was built in 1963 and was opened in 1965. Trains would run west from Bukit Timah under Clementi Road, through Ulu Pandan, under a roundabout at Upper Ayer Rajah Road and Jalan Ahmad Ibrahim and branched out into three lines that penetrated into Jurong Industrial Estate. Despite high expectations of having 2-3 million tons of good moved every year, a shaky merger with Malaysia from 1963 to 1965 led to under-utilisation of the line's potential. The Jurong line eventually closed in the 1990s despite renewed calls from the Automobile Association of Singapore and various members of the public to upgrade the line for passenger service.

Use of steam locomotives was discontinued in Singapore in 1972. Electrification was planned since the late 1970s but plans never come to fruition.

KTM trialled railbus services using experimental vehicles from BRE-Leyland and Ganz Mavag of Hungary between Singapore and Johor Bahru in 1988.

In 1982, a closed loop monorail line commenced operations at the resort island of Sentosa following the approval of plans to build it in 1979. The same year, the green light was also given to the construction of the Mass Rapid Transit (MRT) following a three-phase study conducted from 1972 to 1982 and a debate on an all-bus system against a bus-rail system. The initial MRT network opened in phases from 1987 to 1990, two years ahead of the original deadline of 1992.

In 1990, a rubber-tyred automated people mover, the Changi Airport Skytrain, was opened in Changi Airport to connect between Terminal 1 and the then newly-opened Terminal 2 on both the landside and airside. Like many of its contemporaries such as the Tampa International Airport People Movers and the Gatwick Airport Shuttle Transit, the Skytrain initially used the fully automated Westinghouse-Adtranz C-100 system.

In 1995, the statutory board in charge of the MRT, the MRTC, was merged with several other statutory boards in charge of other land transport matters to form the Land Transport Authority.

=== Last train out of Tanjong Pagar, 2011 ===
The government of Singapore greatly coveted the 217 hectares of land used for the KTM line that was under Malaysian jurisdiction. In 1990, Prime Minister of Singapore Lee Kuan Yew and Malaysian Finance Minister Daim Zainuddin signed a landmark Points of Agreement (POA) where KTM would withdraw north to Woodlands from Tanjong Pagar in return for three parcels of Singapore land by a company jointly owned by Singapore and Malaysia. However, several terms of the POA came under disagreement between the two governments and little progress was made. In 1998, Singapore moved its CIQ facilities to Woodlands from Tanjong Pagar but Malaysia did not follow suit.

It was only in 2010 when an agreement was reached between the Prime Ministers Lee Hsien Loong and Najib Razak to close the loops in the POA. In the end, KTM was shortened to Woodlands Train Checkpoint, while any plans south of Woodlands Train Checkpoint were removed. A cross-border metro system was also agreed upon by the two governments.

On 30 June 2011, Tanjong Pagar railway station saw its last train out before it was closed the next day.

=== Contemporary developments, 1990s onwards ===
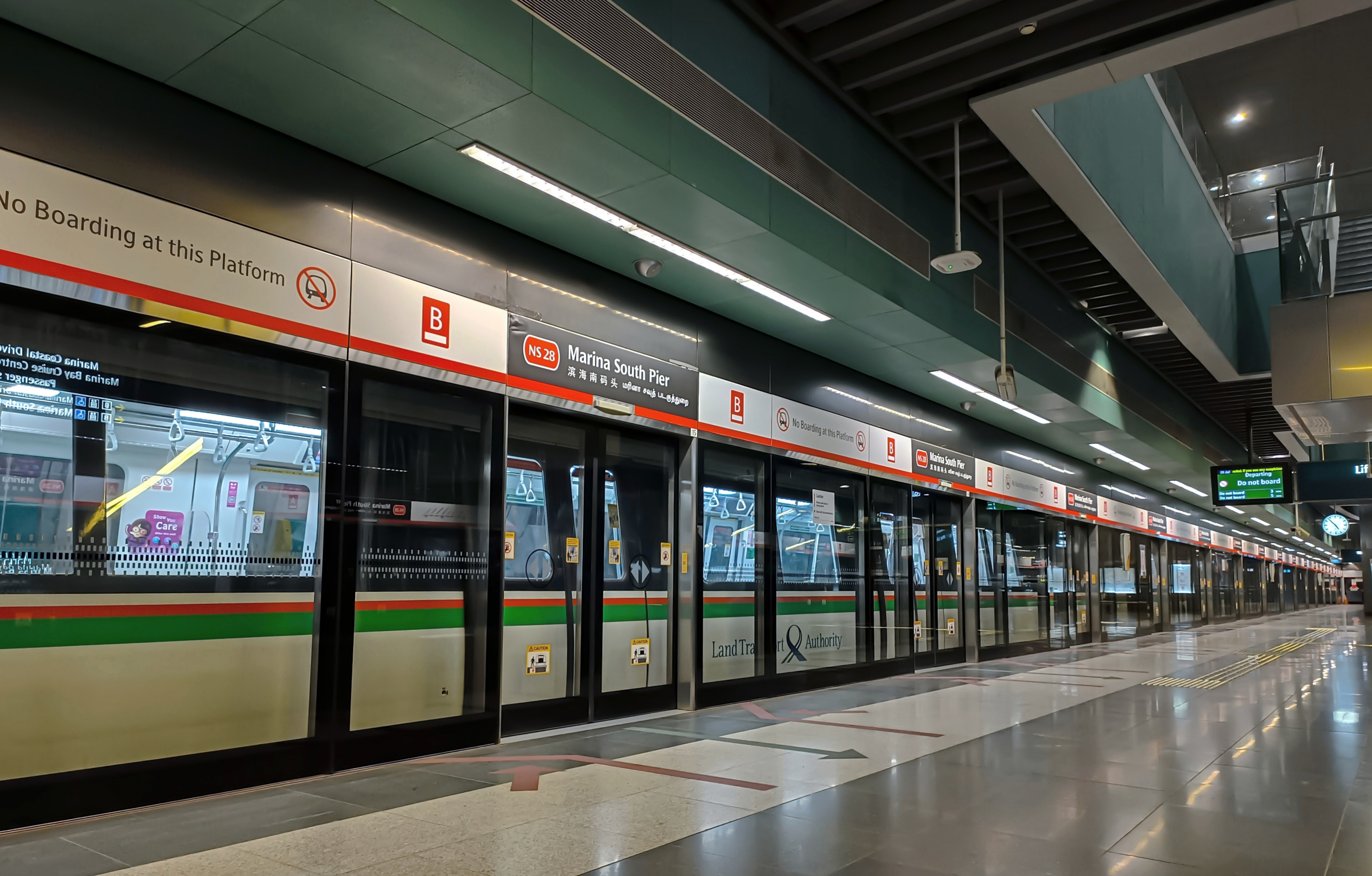
Marina South Pier MRT station is one of the newer MRT stations in the network and was opened in 2014.

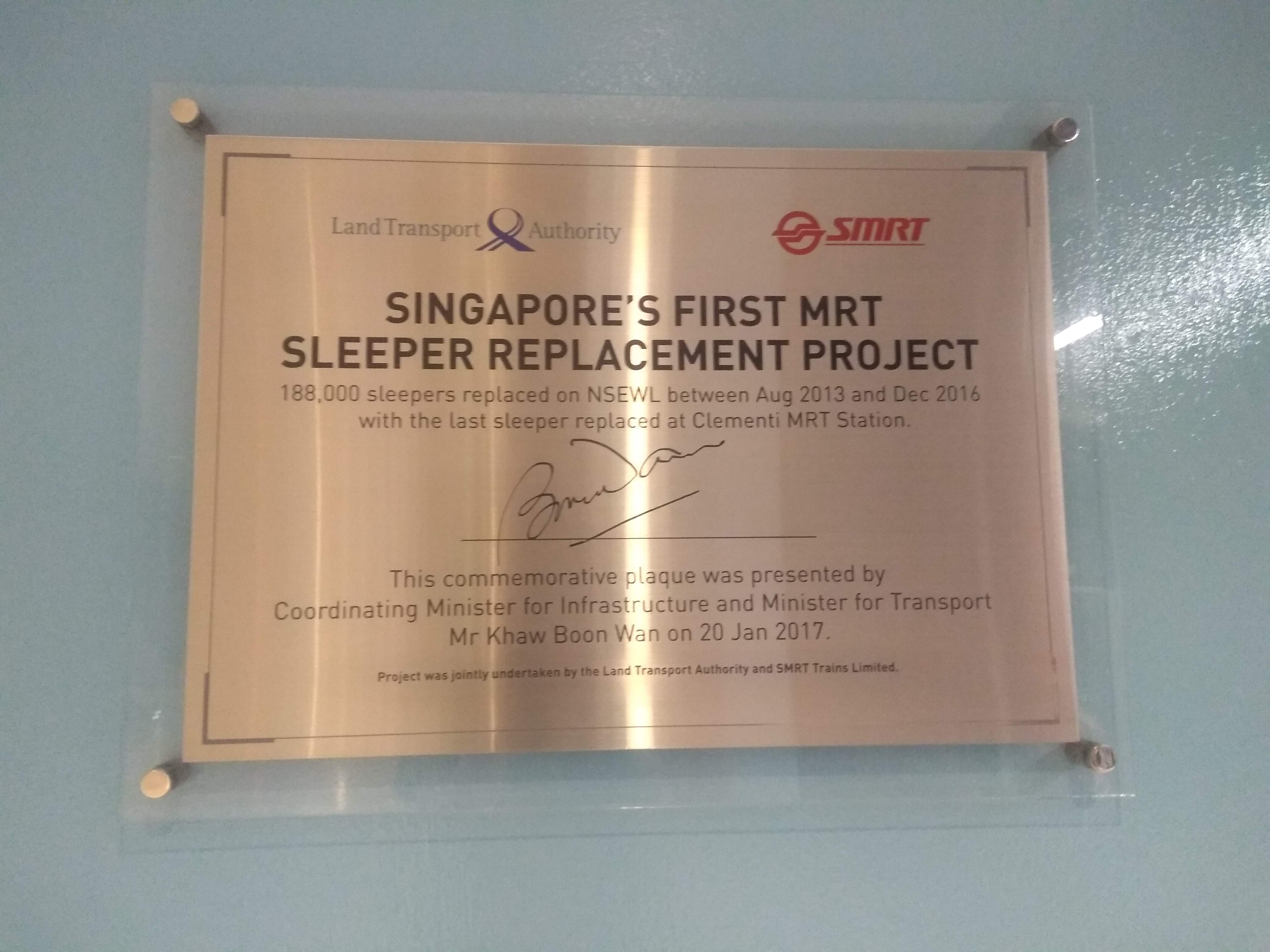
The old timber sleepers on the two oldest MRT lines were replaced with concrete ones from 2013 to 2016.

Since the completion of the initial MRT system in 1990, the Singapore government has taken steps to further expand the city-state's urban rail network; said expansions have been highlighted in many plans such as the 1996 White Paper and various Land Transport Master Plans, the latest of which intends to bring the length of the MRT network up to almost 400 km by 2040. The first of such extensions was the Woodlands extension connecting Sembawang, Woodlands and Kranji to Yishun and Choa Chu Kang in 1996. In 2002, a spur line connecting Changi Airport to the main MRT network via Singapore Expo was fully completed while a new infill MRT station, Dover MRT station, also commenced operations. In 2003, the first fully automated heavy rail metro line (there are several older fully automated medium capacity urban rail systems in cities such as Lille) opened between Punggol and Harbourfront.

Following studies on the feasibility of urban applications of automated people mover systems as feeder transport in the 1990s, a Light Rail Transit (LRT) line was built between Choa Chu Kang and Bukit Panjang and was opened in 1999. However, this LRT line was plagued with many problems such as damaged guide rails. The subsequent LRT lines built in Sengkang and Punggol in the early 2000s hence used the Mitsubishi Crystal Mover instead; said technology was also adopted for the Changi Airport Skytrain in 2007 to replace the original C-100 system when the system was further expanded to serve the new Terminal 3. Several LRT systems were also planned for many other new towns but were either cancelled or planned as new MRT lines instead.

In 2002, construction of the Circle Line, which was previously conceived as separate LRT lines, commenced and was to connect the sub-regional centres of Bishan, Paya Lebar and Buona Vista together. However, construction was impeded by the collapse of Nicoll Highway in 2004 that claimed four lives and injured another three. Operations of the fully automated medium capacity line only commenced in 2009 and the original line was fully completed by 2012. The second medium-capacity MRT line, the Downtown MRT line, was built from 2008 and was opened in stages from 2013 to 2017. In January 2020, the sixth MRT line, the Thomson–East Coast MRT line, commenced operations.

In 2005, the original Sentosa monorail was closed down due to plans to redevelop Sentosa with an integrated resort by 2010. A new Sentosa Express built by Hitachi commenced operations two years later.

The MRT system was hit by a series of serious disruptions in the 2010s, the most serious cases occurring in December 2011, July 2015 and October 2017. To address the problems, the government has sought to renew and expand the network as well as expand the workforce in the rail industry. This has included replacement of sleepers, third rail, power supply, signalling and track circuits on the North–South and East–West lines, procurement of new rolling stock for existing lines and building of new lines to relieve congestion on the existing lines. The Singapore Rail Academy was also inaugurated in 2017 to better train railway engineers. These efforts are starting to pay off with the reliability of the MRT lines improving by almost ten-fold by 2019.

== Urban rail transit ==
=== Mass Rapid Transit (MRT) ===
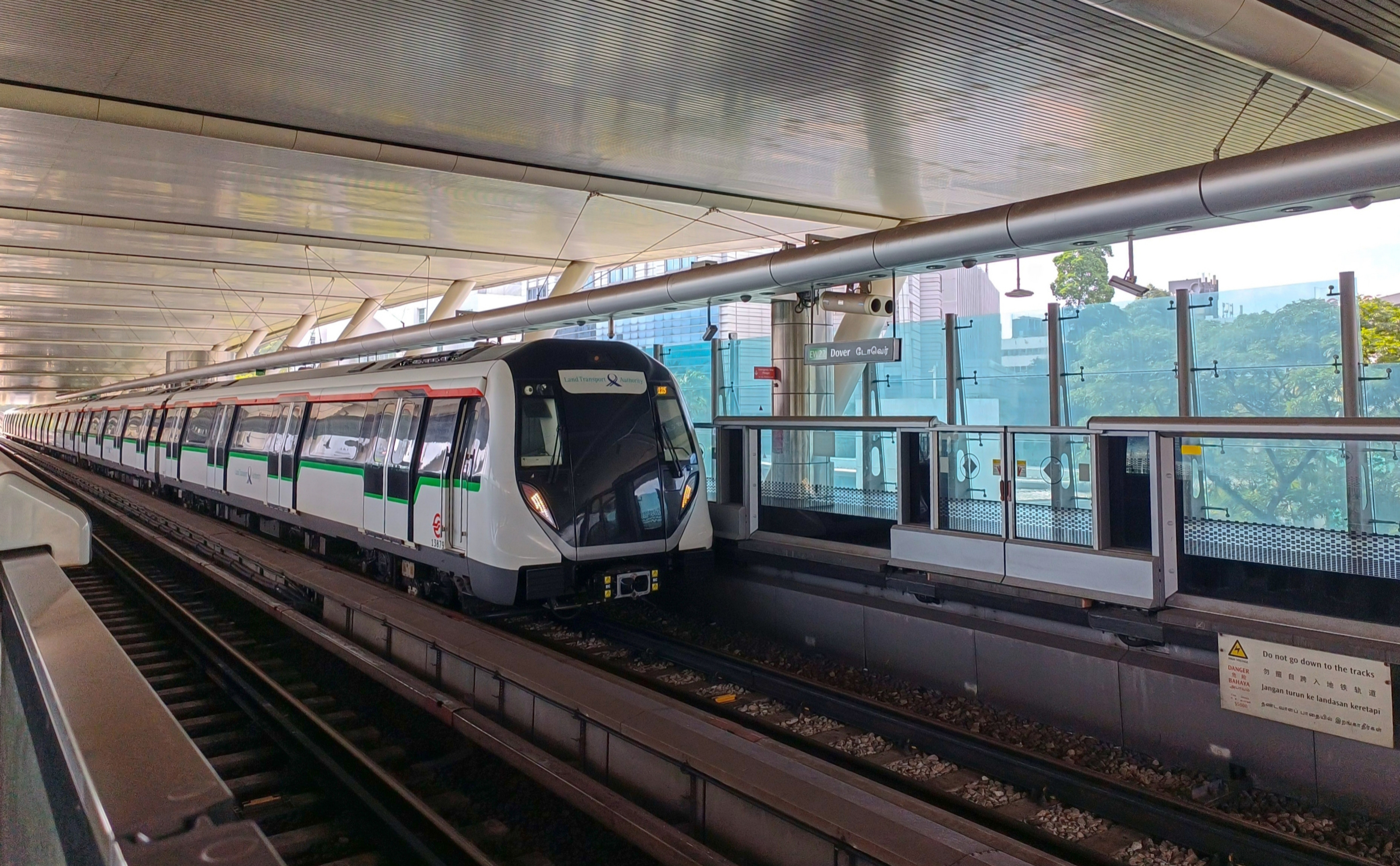
Mass Rapid Transit

The Mass Rapid Transit, which opened in 1987, is a heavy rail metro system that serves as the major backbone of Singapore's public transport system along with public buses; as of 2022, the network has a length of 230 km (142.92 mi) and 134 stations. The Land Transport Authority plans to provide a more comprehensive rail transport system by expanding the rail system to a total of 360 km (223.69 mi) by the year 2030, with eight in ten households living within a 10-minute walking distance of an MRT station.

The current MRT network consists of six main lines: the North–South Line, East–West Line, Circle Line and Thomson–East Coast Line operated by SMRT Trains (SMRT Corporation) and the North East Line and Downtown Line operated by SBS Transit. Two more lines, the Jurong Region Line and the Cross Island Line, will open in stages from 2027 and 2030 respectively.

=== Light Rail Transit (LRT) ===
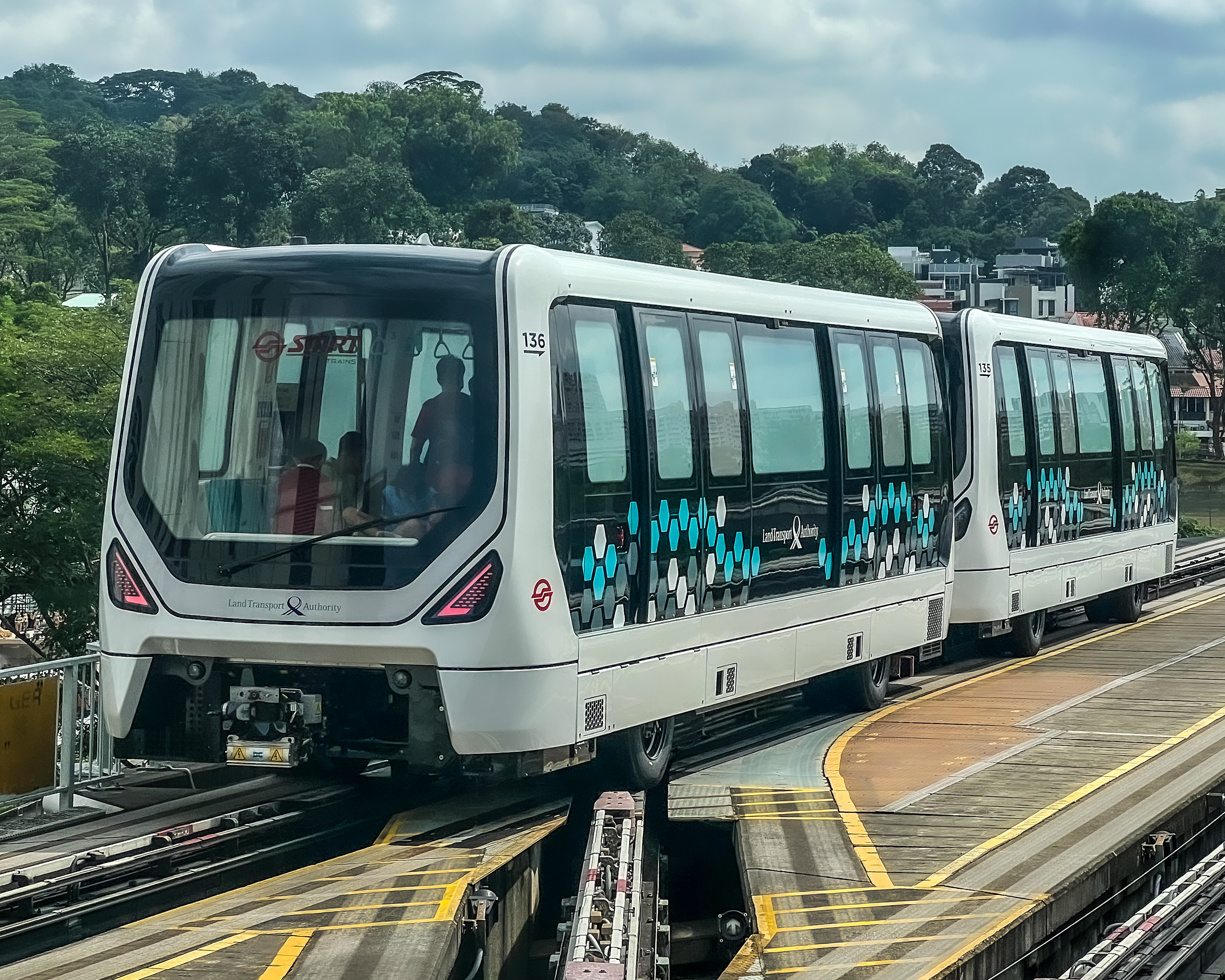
Light Rail Transit

In several new towns, automated rubber-tyred light rail transit systems function as feeders to the main MRT network in lieu of feeder buses. The first LRT line, which is operated by SMRT Light Rail, opened in Bukit Panjang in 1999 to provide a connection to Choa Chu Kang in neighbouring Choa Chu Kang New Town. Although subsequently hit by over 50 incidents, some of which resulted in several days of system suspension, similar systems albeit from a different company were introduced in Sengkang and Punggol in 2003 and 2005 respectively, both operated by SBS Transit.

=== Trams ===
Trams twice operated in Singapore: a steam tram from 1886 to 1894 and an electric tram from 1905 to 1927. Both attempts were unsuccessful and the second attempt was replaced with trolley buses.

== Airport people mover ==
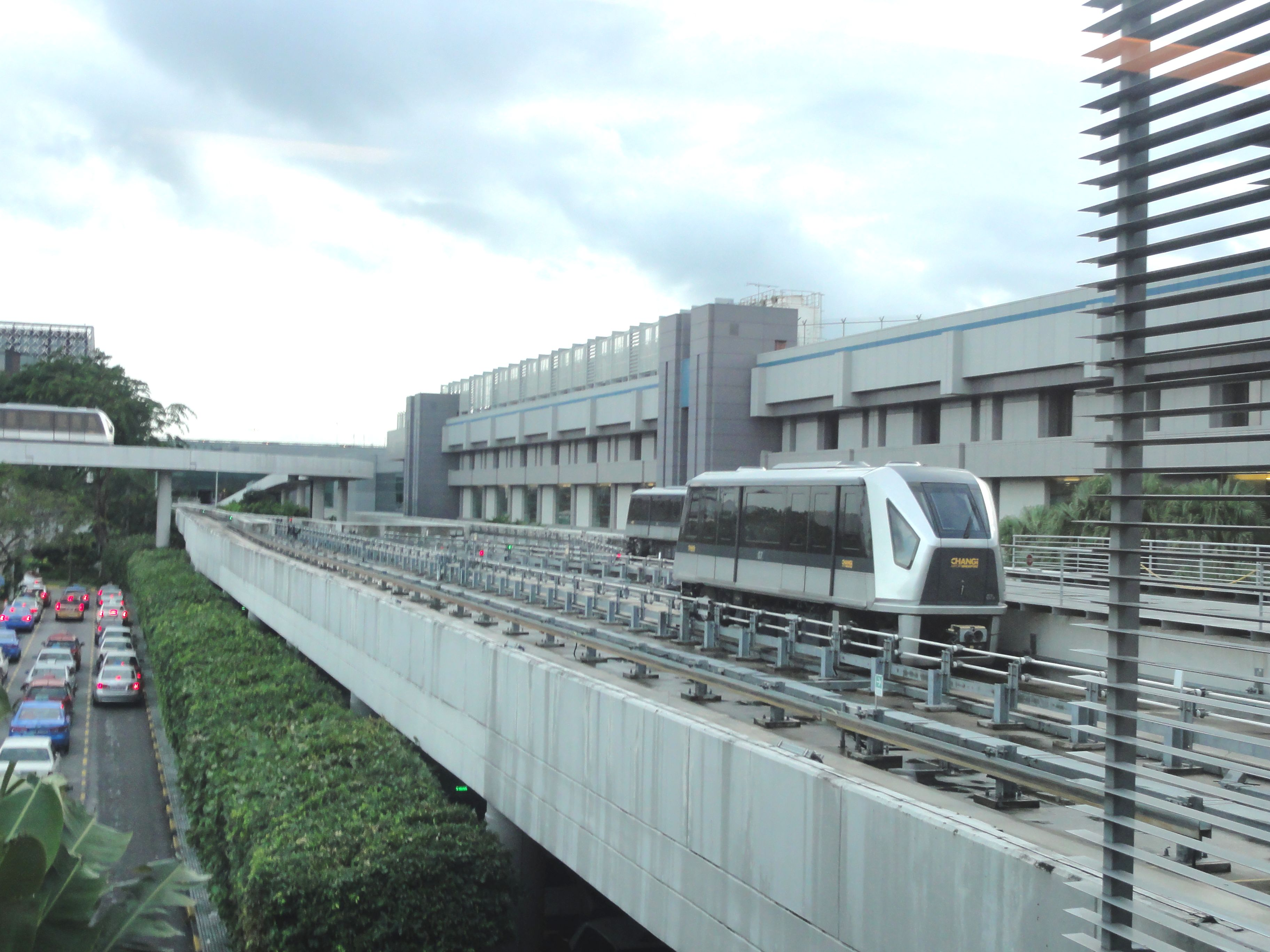
Changi Airport Skytrain

Changi Airport, the main international airport of Singapore, is served by an automated rubber-tyred Skytrain system which first opened in 1990 to connect both the landside and airside of Terminals 1 and 2 when the latter terminal opened the same year. From 2004 to 2007, the original Adtranz C-100 system was replaced with the Mitsubishi Crystal Mover when the system was upgraded and expanded to Terminal 3. In 2019, six more vehicles were phased in and three-car services between Terminals 2 and 3 were introduced to expand the capacity of the system.

An underground airport people mover system will also be built to serve the new Terminal 5.

== Other local rail lines ==
Singapore has had other various forms of light railway systems, such as the monorail system on Sentosa island, which opened in February 1982. This 6.4 km, 7-station system was closed in March 2005 and a new Sentosa Express system was built by December 2006. The Jurong BirdPark previously featured an air-conditioned panorail which closed in 2012. A two-feet gauge railway using diesel-powered "steam locomotives" had also previously operated at the Singapore Zoo in the mid-1990s.

Historically Singapore had also operated several industrial railways at the Port of Singapore and the Mandai Quarry and several military railways at military bases at Admiralty and Changi.

== International rail links ==
=== KTM West Coast railway line ===
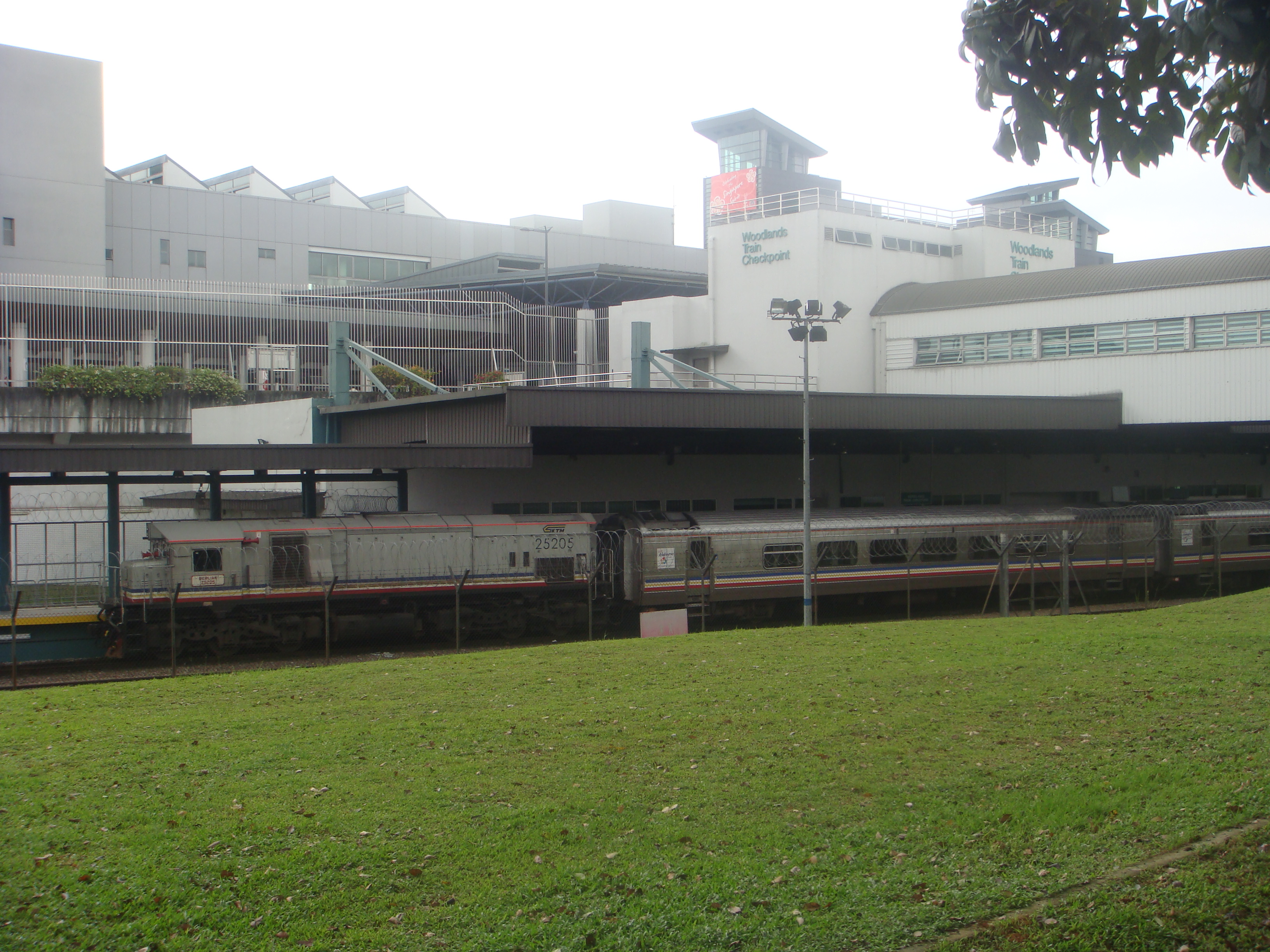
A KTM Intercity train at Woodlands Train Checkpoint

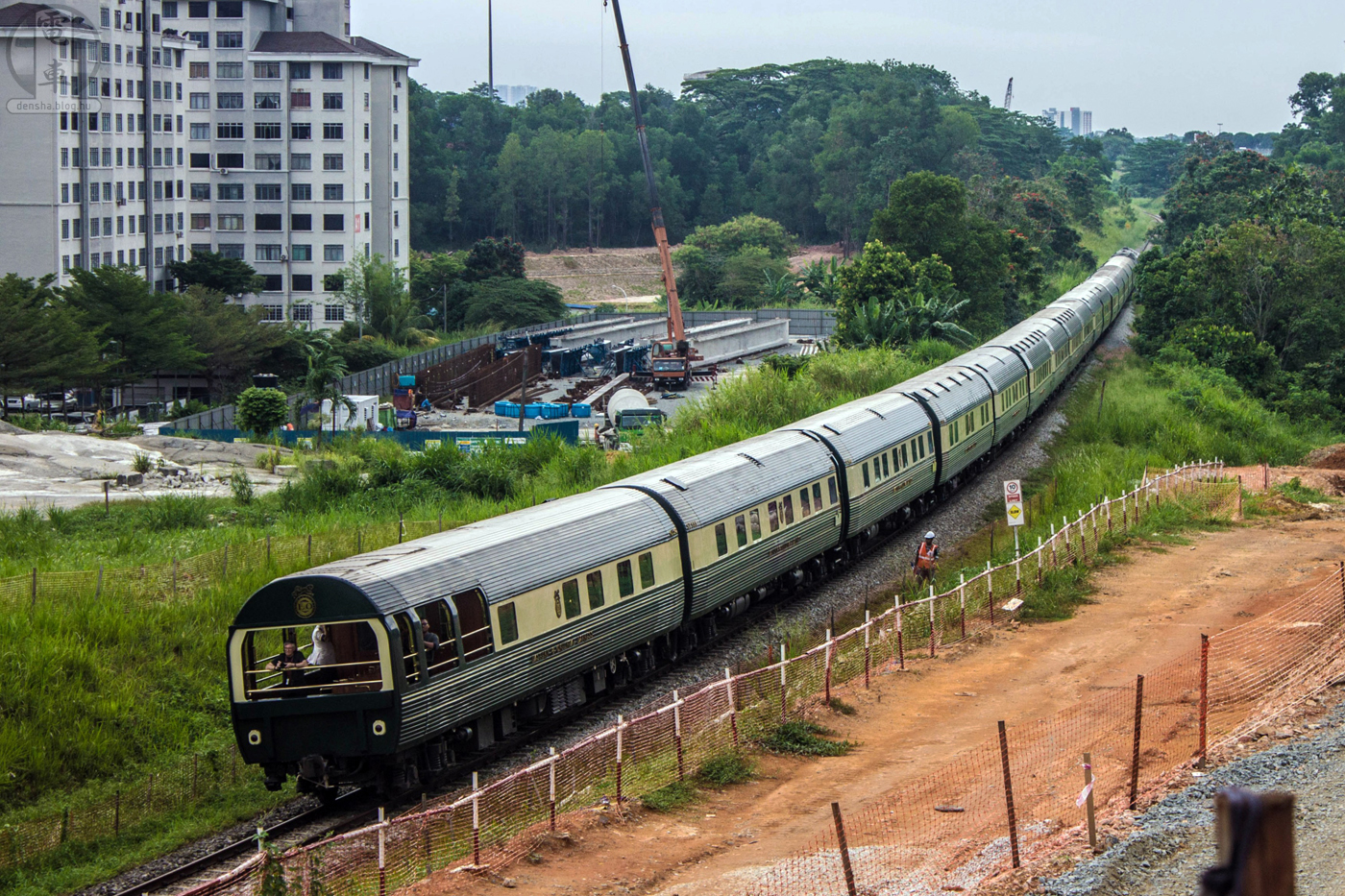
Eastern & Oriental Express

The sole mainline railway line providing direct international connections is the Malaysian West Coast railway line which runs across the Johor–Singapore Causeway from Johor Bahru to Woodlands Train Checkpoint, the southern terminus of the line.

The metre-gauge single track previously ran all the way to the Tanjong Pagar railway station in southern Singapore, running through Kranji, Bukit Timah and Buona Vista. The line was however closed on 30 June 2011 and train services, which were provided by Keretapi Tanah Melayu, ended at Woodlands instead. The railway tracks were progressively removed.

All KTM Intercity train services used to cross the Causeway and end at Woodlands. However, from 1 July 2015, a shuttle service began running between Johor Bahru Sentral railway station (JB Sentral) in Johor Bahru and Woodlands. Intercity train services formerly serving Woodlands Train Checkpoint terminated at JB Sentral. The shuttle service will be replaced by the Johor Bahru–Singapore Rapid Transit System by 2027 when it is expected to become operational.

The Eastern & Oriental Express luxury train runs between Woodlands and Bangkok via Kuala Lumpur.

=== Johor Bahru–Singapore Rapid Transit System ===
The idea of an MRT link across the border to Johor Bahru has been mooted since the first MRT line was built in the 1980s. In 2010 when the relocation of the KTM terminus to Woodlands was agreed, it was also announced that a rapid transit system would be built to enhance connectivity across the border and to relieve congestion on the Johor-Singapore Causeway.

The RTS is currently envisioned as a two-station line. Singapore RTS terminus will be at Woodlands North, providing interchange with the Thomson–East Coast MRT line. The Johor Bahru RTS terminus will be at Bukit Chagar, next to Johor Bahru Sentral railway station and Sultan Iskandar CIQ Building. The two stations will each have combined Customs, Immigration and Quarantine (CIQ) facilities of both countries, similar to the current arrangement at Woodlands Train Checkpoint. Passengers will clear both countries' border controls before boarding the RTS train, and need no further checks upon arrival at the other station.

The RTS link was planned to be operational by 2024, but the project was postponed under the request of the Malaysian government for review, and its completion was pushed to January 2027, with construction starting in 2021. After the completion of the RTS link, train services to Woodlands Train Checkpoint will cease operations, completing KTM's withdrawal from Singapore.

=== Kuala Lumpur–Singapore High Speed Rail ===
Plans to build a high-speed rail link between Singapore and Kuala Lumpur have been mooted in recent years. A proposal was brought up in 2006 by YTL Corporation Berhad, builder and operator of the Express Rail Link in Kuala Lumpur, however it was not further acted upon due to the Malaysian government's lack of interest at that time.

In 2013, the governments of Singapore and Malaysia officially agreed to build the Kuala Lumpur–Singapore High Speed Rail between Kuala Lumpur and Singapore by 2020 at a meeting between Singapore's Prime Minister Lee Hsien Loong and Malaysia's Prime Minister Najib Razak in Singapore. The high-speed rail link will cut travel time between the two cities from seven hours on existing rail lines, to about 90 minutes. Malaysia's Land Public Transport Commission chairman, Syed Hamid Albar, announced seven stops in Malaysia for the high speed railway, namely Kuala Lumpur, Putrajaya, Seremban, Ayer Keroh, Muar, Batu Pahat and Nusajaya. In May 2015, the Singapore government announced Jurong East to be the site of the HSR terminus in Singapore, 600 metres away from the current Jurong East MRT station. Construction of the railway was expected to start in 2018. In May 2018, the Malaysian Prime Minister Mahathir Mohamad initially announced that the line was to be cancelled, but later said that the project was merely delayed. An agreement for a two-year suspension was made, and the line was expected to open by January 2031. However the two governments ultimately failed to reach an agreement to continue the project and terminated it on 1 January 2021 in a joint statement. In March 2021, Malaysia compensated Singapore S$102.8 million for the terminated project. In November 2021, the Malaysian Prime Minister Ismail Sabri Yaakob suggested reviving the project with route changes. Malaysia is currently in the process of gathering concept proposals to deliver the project under a joint public-private partnership.

== Technical specifications ==
=== Trackwork and structure gauge ===
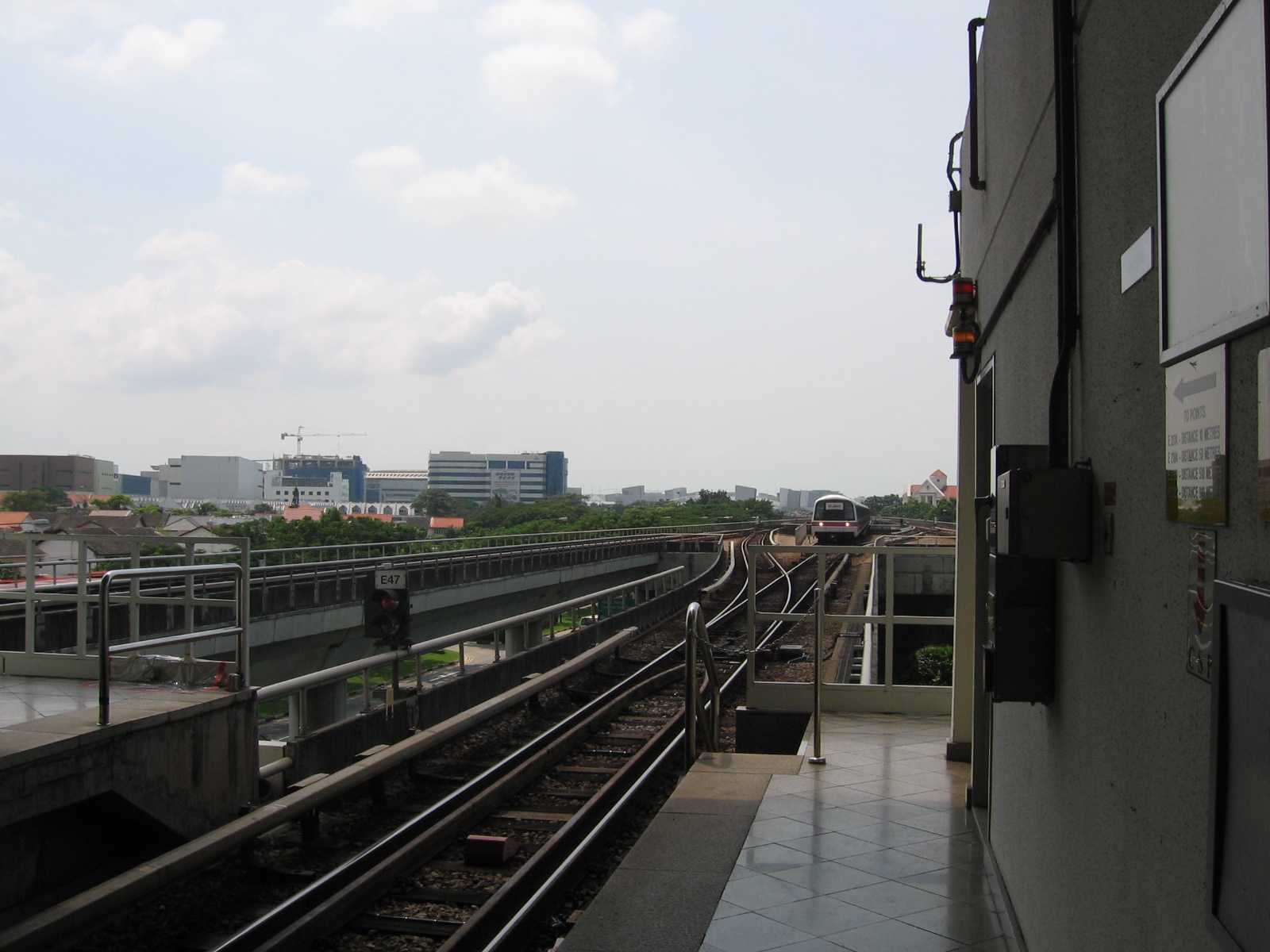
Elevated rail tracks in the MRT network have guard rails for safety purposes.

Historically, railway lines from the colonial period, such as the now-defunct trams and the KTM rail lines, used the metre gauge of 1,000mm. However several military railways in former British military bases also used the standard gauge of 1,435mm.

The contemporary MRT system uses the 1,435mm standard track gauge with the elevated lines also having guard rails to prevent a derailed vehicle from striking fixed obstructions and viaduct parapets by keeping derailed wheels adjacent to the running rails. Three types of rail tracks are used on the MRT: ballasted track, fixed slab track and floating slab track; floating slab tracks are used at sections of the rail network located beneath densely populated and built-up areas to alleviate vibration and noise transmission to neighbouring buildings, by means of interposing rubberised supports between the tunnel wall and the tracks. When initially built, the MRT used swingnose crossings for 26 out of 131 railway points to minimise noise. From July to November 2000, these swingnose crossings were replaced with conventional ones for reliability reasons.

The structure gauge of the MRT is based upon the kinematic envelope such that each point on the perimeter of the kinematic envelope is enlarged vertically upwards by 50mm and horizontally by 100mm.

The Sengkang-Punggol LRT and Changi Airport Skytrain use a 1,880mm broad gauge guideway while the Bukit Panjang LRT line relies on a central guide rail.

=== Coupling ===
KTM uses AAR couplers on its trains. All trains on the MRT network, including work trains, use Scharfenberg type 35 couplers. The Bukit Panjang LRT uses BSI (Bergische Stahl Industrie) couplers whereas the Mitsubishi Crystal Mover vehicles used on the Sengkang and Punggol LRT use the compact tight coupler from Japan Steel Works.

=== Railway electrification ===
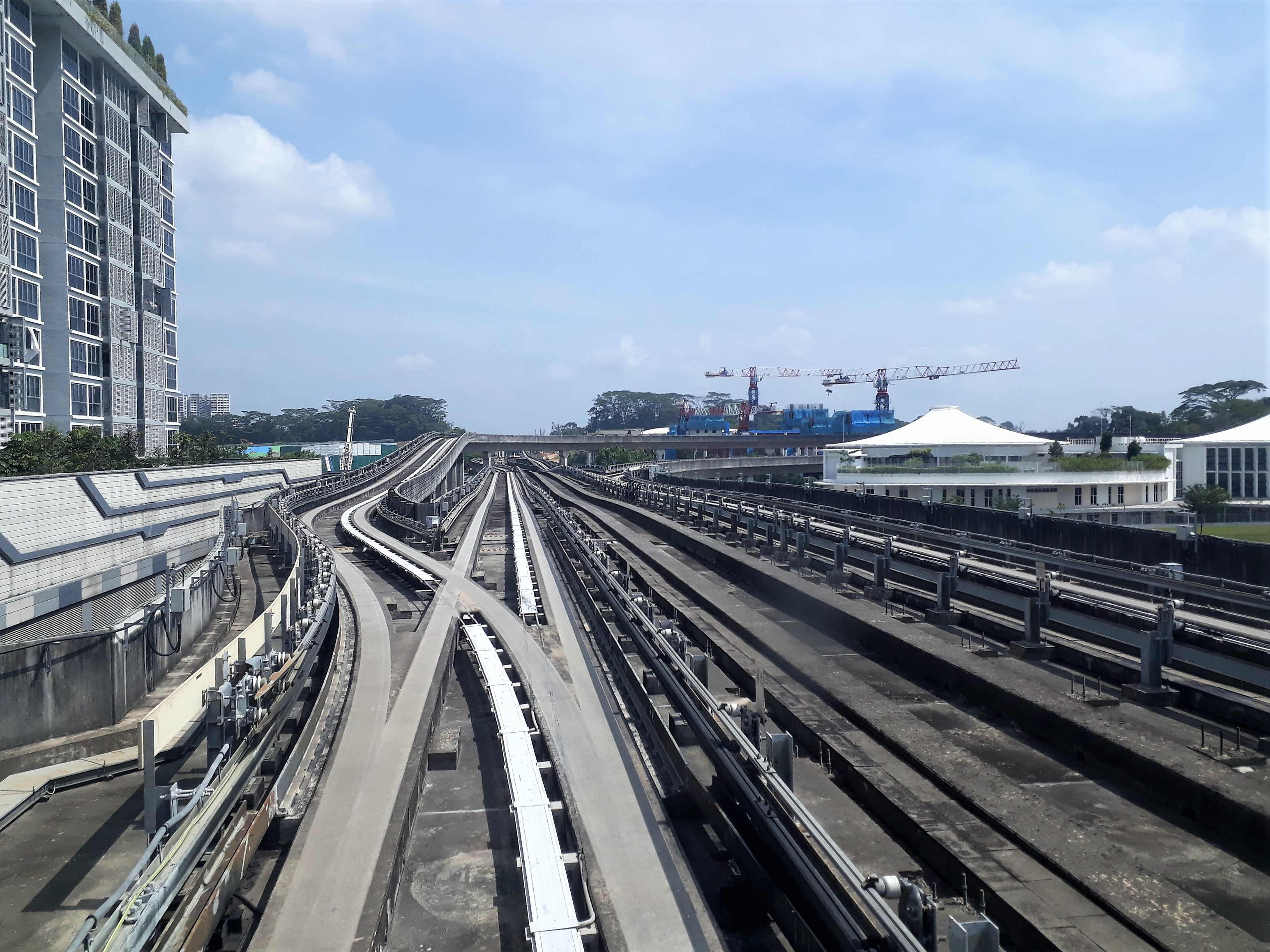
Guideway of the Punggol LRT, with the third rail located to the right of the guideway.

The entire MRT network uses the 750V DC third rail with the exception of the North East Line, which uses 1,500V overhead catenary.

The Bukit Panjang LRT uses a 650V three phase AC third rail located between the guide beams whereas the Sengkang and Punggol LRT use a side-mounted 750V DC third rail.

=== Railway signalling ===
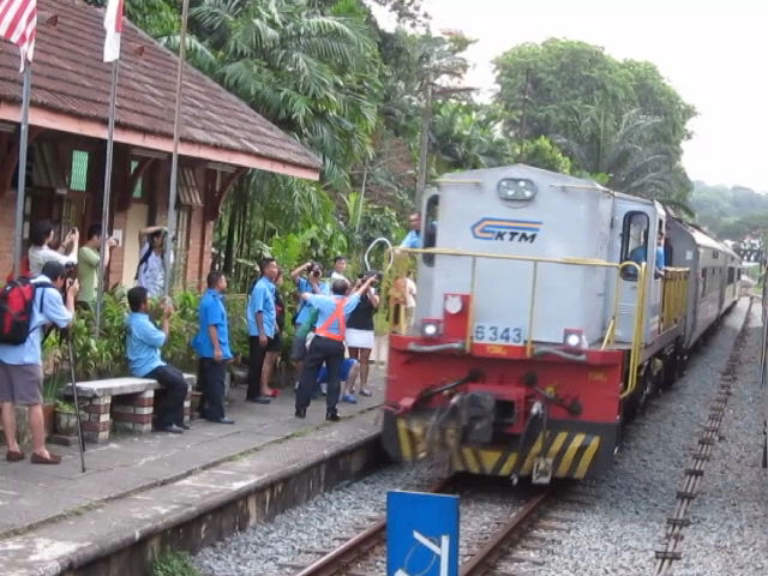
Token signalling as used at KTM Bukit Timah station

The KTM was known to use token signalling in Singapore as the main line between Woodlands and Tanjong Pagar was a single track line.

In contrast the MRT system uses contemporary technology for its signalling systems such as computer-based interlocking, automatic train protection, automatic train operation and automatic train supervision. Although the original signalling system used on the North–South and East–West lines were previously fixed-block, newer MRT lines use a moving block system and the former two lines have also been migrated to a moving block system. Although all MRT lines are automated and correspond to a Grade of Automation (GOA) 4, degraded modes in the form of Coded Manual and Restricted Manual are available for emergency and shunting purposes.

=== Railway standards ===
In the 1980s the railway standards adopted on the MRT network were from the United Kingdom and Japan, with the former being for railway signalling and train control systems and the latter for rolling stock. The NFPA 130 Standard for Fixed Guideway Transit and Passenger Rail Systems from the USA were also initially adopted as no local standards for a rapid transit system existed then until the development of the Standard for Fire Safety in Rapid Transit Systems (SFSRTS) by LTA and the Singapore Civil Defense Force in 2000. Subsequent railway standards for subsequent MRT lines were adopted from CENELEC of Europe; LTA also ensures that these new lines are compliant to standards laid out under ISO TC 269 and IEC TC 9, the latter which LTA is also a participating member.

In March 2021, the first three areas of the Singapore Railway Standards was launched with the ultimate goal being to provide a benchmark for the rail industry players in Singapore. Developed by 17 working groups under a technical committee established in 2020, the standards would cover on asset management, maintenance, safety and security, and service.

== See also ==
- Transport in Singapore

== Bibliography ==
- Freeman, Lewis R. (22 March 1913). "How the Railroad is Modernising Asia". The Advertiser. Adelaide, SA, Australia. p. 8. (An historical article of approx. 1,500 words, covering about a dozen Asian countries.)
- McNicol, Steve (1985). Kuala Lumpur & Singapore: a railway pictorial. Elizabeth, SA, Australia: Railmac Publications. ISBN 0949817503.
- Pang, Hock Lye, John; Cheong, Mun Kit, Eric (2019). Railway Systems Handbook. Singapore: Institution of Engineers Singapore. ISBN 978-981-14-2006-1.
