= Sentosa Express =

Monorail connecting Singapore with Sentosa

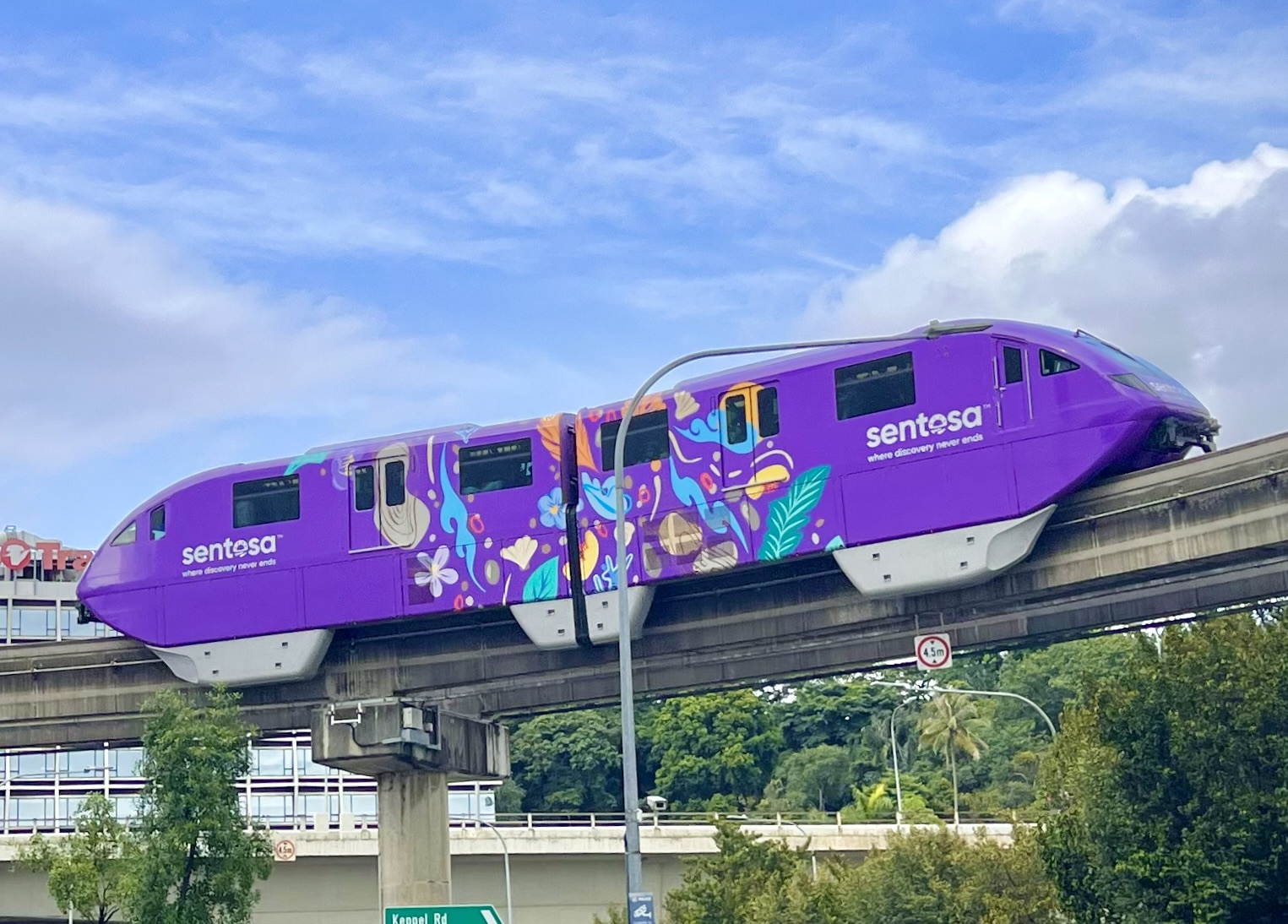
- The purple Sentosa Express trainset

Overview
- Status: Operational
- Owner: Sentosa Development Corporation
- Locale: Sentosa, Singapore
- Stations: 4

Service
- Type: Straddle beam monorail
- Services: 1
- Operator(s): SMRT Corporation; Under their subsidiary Strides
- Depot: Beach
- Rolling stock: 7 × 2-car Hitachi small-type monorail

History
- Opened: 15 January 2007; 19 years ago

Technical
- Line length: 2.1 km (1.3 mi)
- Character: Fully elevated
- Electrification: 750 V DC third rail
- Operating speed: Limit of 50 km/h (31 mph)
- Signalling: Original: Fixed block Hitachi digital ATP/ATS for GoA 1 Current: Moving block Hitachi wireless CBTC ATC under ATO GoA 3 (DTO), with subsystems of ATP, ATS and CBI

The Sentosa Express is a monorail line connecting Sentosa island to HarbourFront on the Singapore mainland. It was built at a cost of S$140 million to replace the previous Sentosa Monorail. Development began in June 2003 and construction works were completed in late 2006. The fully elevated 2.1-kilometre (1.3-mile; per direction) two-way line (4.3-km total track length) opened on 15 January 2007. The monorail system, privately owned by Sentosa Development Corporation and operated by SMRT Corporation, can move up to 4,000 passengers per hour per direction.

== History ==
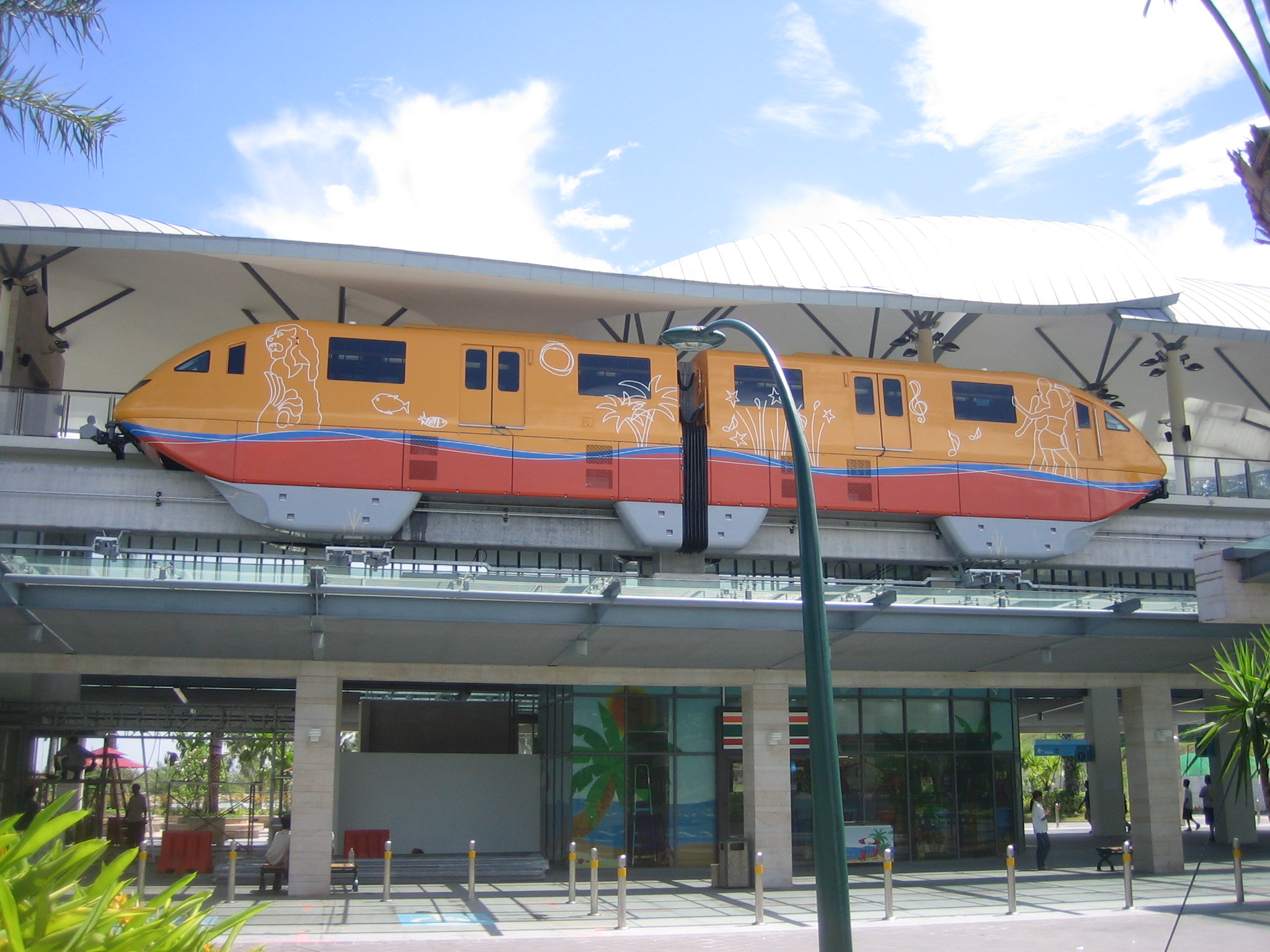
The Sentosa Express system undergoing trial runs in 2006 in the old livery

In June 2002, the Sentosa Development Corporation (SDC) awarded a S$78 million (US$43.56 million) contract to Japanese subsidiary Hitachi Asia to build the Sentosa Express, which was part of a ten-year redevelopment plan for Sentosa, an offshore island south of the Singapore main island dedicated to tourism. It was to replace the Sentosa Monorail which had been in operation since 1982, with the previous monorail planned for demolition by 2005. Unlike its predecessor which ran in a loop around the island, the Sentosa Express crosses the sea to interchange with the North East Line of the MRT on the mainland, with three stations on Sentosa itself, making up a total of four stations.

Construction of the system began in June 2003, took three and a half years, and was completed in late 2006, costing S$140 million (US$88.11 million). Two of three stations on the island, Imbiah and Beach stations, opened with the line on 15 January 2007 along with VivoCity station (previously called Sentosa station) on the mainland, which had been integrated into the new VivoCity shopping mall.

The third station Waterfront (now called Resorts World station) was planned to open in tandem with the then-in development integrated resort Resorts World Sentosa, but was demolished a year later in January 2008 for redevelopment. A spokesman from the Sentosa Leisure Group said that the station had been built before plans for the integrated resort were finalised. The station opened on 1 February 2010 as part of a phased opening of the entire resort complex.

To cater to an increase in passenger traffic, the SDC awarded a S$30 million (US$23.68 million) upgrading contract to Hitachi Asia in November 2014. The signalling system was to be upgraded to a communications-based train control system, with the provision of two additional train cars, and to be operational by the end of 2017.

During the Ministry of State for Trade and Industry's budget debate speech on 2 March 2026, trade and industry minister Alvin Tan announced that the Sentosa Express will be replaced by Pulau Brani People-Mover System under Greater Sentosa Master Plan Phase 1 to improve connectivity.

== Network and operations ==
=== Train timings ===
The daily first and last train timings of both VivoCity and Beach stations are 07:00 and 00:00 hours. Trains run at an average frequency of three minutes throughout the day. The entire route, from one terminus to the other, takes eight minutes.

=== Fares and ticketing ===
Travel within Sentosa (between Resorts World and Beach stations) and from Sentosa back to the mainland is free of charge. Travel from the mainland to Sentosa is charged but during the COVID-19 pandemic period until 31 March 2023, travel was free.

Commuters can scan the CEPAS (EZ-Link, Concession, NETS FlashPay and SimplyGo EZ-Link/SimplyGo Concession) cards and NETS/credit/debit cards on the VivoCity station's faregates for entry payment from the mainland. Those who are using NETS/credit/debit cards must use the special entrance on the left at VivoCity station. Fares are as follows:

- $4: All other cards (including credit/debit cards)
- $2: Senior Citizens, Persons with Disabilities, Workfare Transport Concession Card, Primary, Secondary, Junior Colleges, ITE and Polytechnic Concession Card
- $0: Child Concession Card

=== Stations ===
Sentosa Express stations timeline
Date	Project	Description
15 January 2007	Sentosa Express	Opening of Sentosa, Imbiah and Beach stations
1 February 2010	Sentosa Express	Waterfront station opened between VivoCity and Imbiah
1 April 2019	Sentosa Express	Sentosa and Waterfront stations were renamed VivoCity and Resorts World stations respectively to better reflect surrounding attractions
November 2023	Sentosa Express	Opening of newly constructed alighting platform at Beach station

Legend:

Elevated	Line terminus	Transfer outside paid area
Ground-level	Wheelchair accessible	Bus interchange
Underground	Civil Defence Shelter	Other transportation modes

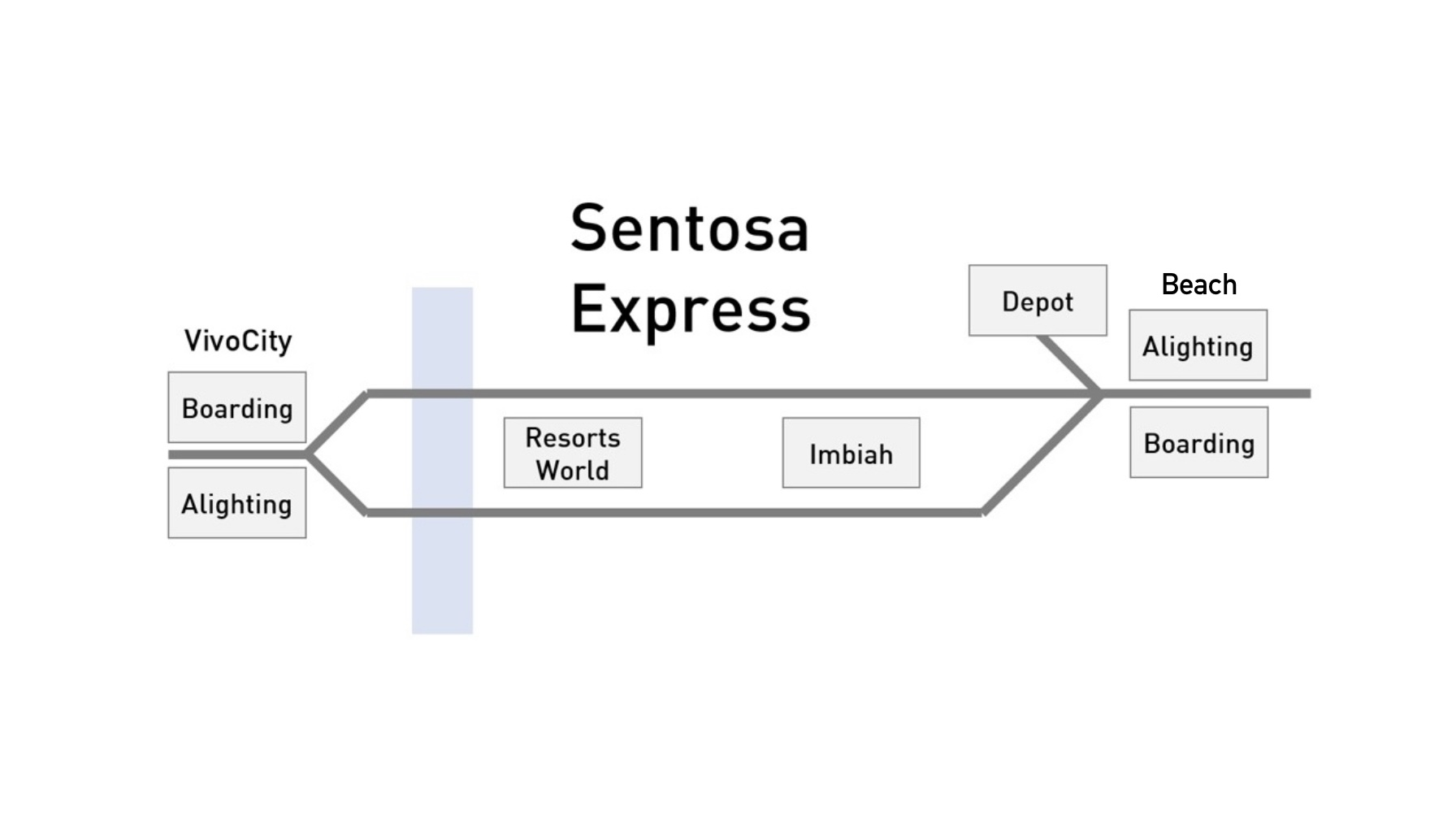
Sentosa Express Track Diagram

Station name / colour code	Images	Interchange; Adjacent transportation	Opened	Initial name	Working name
VivoCity		North East Line; Circle Line ― HarbourFront ― Singapore Cable Car Mount Faber Line; HarbourFront Centre; Singapore Cruise Centre	15 January 2007	Sentosa	Gateway
Resorts World		Resorts World Sentosa	1 February 2010	Waterfront	Sentosa
Imbiah		Singapore Cable Car Mount Faber Line; Singapore Cable Car Sentosa Line	15 January 2007	—N/a	Merlion
Beach		Beach Station Bus Terminal	15 January 2007	—N/a	Palawan

S$26 million was spent on the elevated stations and the depot next to Beach station. VivoCity station is the only station of the line on the mainland; the rest are on Sentosa. It is also the only one with full-height platform screen doors. The other stations on Sentosa island are not air-conditioned and are the first train stations in the country to utilise half height platform screen doors by Fangda.

Like the Mass Rapid Transit, stations have bi-directional escalators and a lift to take passengers from the station concourse to the platforms, except VivoCity station which has both on the same level within VivoCity on the mainland.

Both Vivocity Station and (since 2023) Beach Station employ a bay platform using the Spanish solution – passengers enter via one side of the train after passengers have alighted on the other side. This layout was also used by the now dismantled Sentosa Monorail stations; the only other remaining station in Singapore that uses this model is Choa Chu Kang LRT station.

==== VivoCity ====
The northern terminus VivoCity station (previously Sentosa @ VivoCity) is just a few levels above HarbourFront MRT station and the nearby HarbourFront Bus Interchange, located within the mall it is named after. Like Changi Airport and Stevens MRT stations, ticketing, faregates and platforms are all on the same level.

The station consists of a single track and a single platform handling Beach-bound trains for turnaround. This is the only station on the Sentosa Express that is air-conditioned and utilises full-height platform screen doors.

On 1 April 2019, the station was renamed to its present name to better reflect the nearby attractions and to showcase the attractions names.

==== Resorts World ====
Resorts World station is located in the northern region of Sentosa within Resorts World Sentosa. Platform A handles Beach-bound trains, while Platform B handles VivoCity-bound trains. There are two tracks and one island platform. As the line is left-hand drive, all train doors open on the right. It also connects to the Resorts World Sentosa.

The station was originally known as Waterfront and operated for nearly a year before closing down in January 2008, to make way for the construction of Resorts World Sentosa. It was rebuilt and reopened on 1 February 2010. On 1 April 2019, the station was renamed Resorts World after the integrated resort.

==== Imbiah ====
Imbiah station is located in the middle of Sentosa next to Imbiah Lookout. Platform A handles Beach-bound trains, while Platform B handles VivoCity-bound trains. There are two tracks and one island platform. As the line is left-hand drive, all train doors open on the right. The nearest attraction is Madame Tussauds Singapore and the Singapore Cable Car.

==== Beach ====
The southern terminus Beach station is located between Siloso Beach and Palawan Beach at Sentosa. The station consisted of a single track and a single platform handling VivoCity-bound trains for turnaround. In November 2023, a new platform was opened for alighting passengers, employing a Spanish solution in the station.

At the street level, there are beaches, shops, sea sports, pubs, cafés, and restaurants. It is connected to the Beach Station Transfer Hub for transfers to Beach Trams, SBS Transit Bus Service 123, Sentosa Golf Club Shuttle, Shuttle to HarbourFront as well as Sentosa Internal Bus Services A & B.

The Beach Shuttles run along the Beach to Siloso Beach and Palawan and Tanjong Beaches. The shuttle loops at Siloso Beach and Tanjong Beach respectively.

== Infrastructure ==
=== Rolling stock ===
The Sentosa Express is the first system to use Hitachi Rail's small-type, straddle–beam monorail with a capacity of about 184 passengers per train. With a total of seven two-car, 25-metre (82 ft)-long trains of different colours each—namely green, orange, blue, purple, pink, red and yellow; the pink and red trains were added to the original fleet of four on 1 December 2009; the yellow train was added on 24 November 2017. In 2015, the orange train was painted into a multi-coloured livery train. In addition, there are 2 other yellow maintenance trains.

Daily, five monorails are picked to be deployed on the line while the other two remain in the depot.

=== Signalling ===
A switch over from the fixed block Hitachi digital ATP/ATS to the moving block Hitachi wireless CBTC-ATC was conducted in November 2017. The new CBTC system uses wireless communication to gather data on trains' locations and speeds so that the headway between trains can be reduced. This will reduce the travel times for passengers, and allow more trains to run together for greater capacity. With the implementation of the driverless CBTC system, all train cab windows are opened except during manual operation. Train Captains are still present in the front train cab to manage and monitor for safety and security risks on the train.

== See also ==
- Sentosa
- Sentosa Monorail – a dismantled monorail system that used to ferry visitors around Sentosa from 1982 to 2005
- Rail transport in Singapore
