= Cluny Road railway station =

Railway station in Singapore

Cluny Road

General information
- Location: Singapore
- Coordinates: 1°19′25″N 103°48′45″E
- Platforms: 1

Other information
- Status: Disused

History
- Opened: 1 January 1903; 123 years ago
- Closed: 2 May 1932; 94 years ago

Former services
Preceding station	Federated Malay States Railways	Following station
Holland Road towards Woodlands	Singapore Government Railway	Newton towards Pasir Panjang
Location

Cluny Road railway station was a railway station on the Singapore–Kranji Railway from 1903 to 1932.

== History ==
Cluny Road railway station was opened to the public on 1 January 1903, along Bukit Timah Road, as one of the first four railway stations in Singapore, along with the Tank Road, Newton and Bukit Timah railway stations. Cluny Road station, Holland Road station and Bukit Timah station helped attract residents to the area surrounding the stations. However, many residents were later forced to move away from both Cluny Road station and Newton station as the land in the surrounding areas were low and were constantly flooded during wet seasons. The highest passenger volume was on Sundays, as the railway allowed easier access to gambling dens in Johor, which offered to pay for return fares, attracting gamblers from Singapore. In 1907, the station reported a decrease in revenue, as many residents had left the surrounding area for other districts, and fewer residents were using the station to get to Johor.

As it was decided that Tank Road station was unfit to be the terminus of the line, it was decided that the Bukit Timah-Tank Road section of the line would be abandoned, and the line would instead deviate in between Bukit Panjang and Bukit Timah, travelling down a different route which ran along the west of the main town, to a new terminal station at Tanjong Pagar. Cluny Road station, along with the rest of the Bukit Timah-Tank Road section of the line, was closed and abandoned on 2 May 1932, with the opening of the new terminus at Tanjong Pagar.

The former site of the station is currently being occupied by a part of the Dunearn Underpass.

== Incidents ==
On 22 February 1908, at around 11.30 at night, a night signal man, stationed near Cluny Road station, was decapitated, and mutilated by an oncoming train. Earlier, he had left his lamp on the tracks, and went to sleep. As he heard the oncoming train, he made a dash for the lamp, but was instead hit by the train. An inquest was held at the station on 26 February 1908, and a verdict of accidental death was returned. The accident was one of two fatal incidents on the railway that year.
