= Holland Road railway station =

Former railway station in Singapore

Holland Road

General information
- Location: Singapore
- Coordinates: 1°20′1″N 103°47′27″E
- Platforms: 1

Other information
- Status: Disused

History
- Opened: 16 July 1903; 123 years ago
- Closed: 10 March 1930; 96 years ago

Former services
Preceding station	Federated Malay States Railways	Following station
Bukit Timah towards Woodlands	Singapore–Kranji Railway (1903–1932)	Cluny Road towards Pasir Panjang
Location

Holland Road railway station was a railway station on the Singapore–Kranji Railway from 1903 to 1930.

== History ==
Holland Road railway station was opened to the public on 16 July 1903, along Holland Road, as an infill station on the Singapore Railway between Cluny Road and Bukit Timah station. Cluny Road station, Holland Road station and Bukit Timah station helped attract residents to the area surrounding the stations, developing the surrounding neighbourhoods. The station was also convenient to members of the Swiss Rifle Club, as the rifle club's range was relatively near the station, as well as the St. Valentine Bath Hotel, which was also near the station.

As it was decided that Tank Road station was unfit to be the terminus of the line, it was decided that the Bukit Timah-Tank Road section of the line would be abandoned, and the line would instead deviate in between Bukit Panjang and Bukit Timah, travelling down a different route which ran along the west of the main town, to a new terminal station at Tanjong Pagar. Holland Road station was closed on 10 March 1930.

== Incidents ==
On 18 June 1918, near Holland Road Station, a train collided with a car driven by a chauffeur. The car was carried along by the train for a distance. Police inspector Dyam arrived on the scene soon after and the occupants of the car, the chauffeur and a servant, were taken to Tan Tock Seng Hospital, where the servant was pronounced dead. The chauffeur later died due to the injuries he sustained from the accident. A verdict of death due to misadventure was returned.

On 17 August 1919, a woman and a porter, Amakutty, with whom she was having an affair, were stabbed to death by her husband, Krishnasamy, at the station's coolie quarters, after he found out about their affair. Following the murder, Krishnasamy fled along the railway with his child in his left arm and the murder weapon in his other arm, and was found by policemen from Bukit Timah Road police station. They then promised to release him if he surrendered, which he accepted.
