= Borneo Wharf railway station =

Former railway station in Singapore

Borneo Wharf
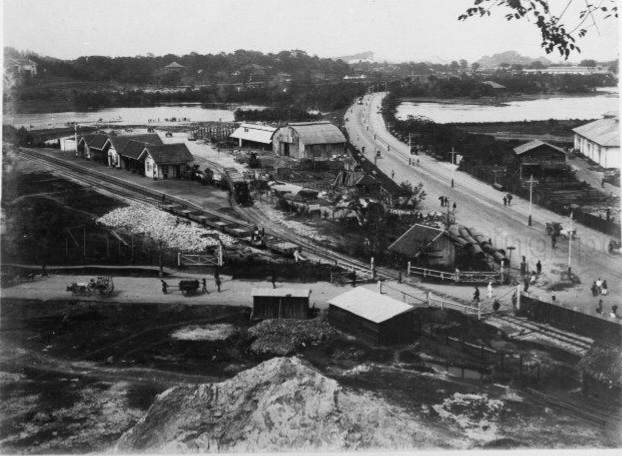

General information
- Location: Singapore
- Coordinates: 1.27116°N 103.82892°E
- Platforms: 2

Other information
- Status: Disused

History
- Opened: 21 January 1907; 119 years ago
- Closed: Between 1929 and 1932

Former services
| Preceding station | Federated Malay States Railways | Following station |
|---|---|---|
| People's Park towards Woodlands | Singapore–Kranji Railway (1903–1932) | Pasir Panjang Terminus |
Location

Borneo Wharf railway station was a railway station which served Borneo Wharf on the Singapore–Kranji Railway from 1907 to 1932.

== History ==
Borneo Wharf railway station was opened to the public on 21 January 1907, as one of the two original railway stations on the 1907 extension of the Singapore-Kranji railway from Tank Road station, along with Pasir Panjang railway station. The station was built along Keppel Road, next to Nelson Road and Breeze Hill, in front of a coolie shed. It served those travelling to Singapore after arriving at Borneo Wharf, removing the need to ride a rickshaw to the main town. The station did not have a shelter, forcing passengers to stand under the sun or in the rain while waiting for a train to arrive. In 1909, the bridge near the station went under repairs, and a temporary wooden structure was erected to replace it. However, the bridge was later revealed to be unfixable, and a new permanent 15-feet bridge was erected near the station.

As the line from Pasir Panjang station to Tank Road station did not generate enough revenue, it was closed to passenger traffic on 1 April 1908, carrying only freight since then.

As it was decided that Tank Road station was unfit to be the terminus of the line, it was decided that the Bukit Timah-Tank Road section of the line would be abandoned, and the line would instead deviate in between Bukit Panjang and Bukit Timah, travelling down a different route which ran along the west of the main town, to a new terminal station at Tanjong Pagar. Pasir Panjang station, as well as rest of the Tank Road-Pasir Panjang line was negotiated off to the Singapore Harbour Board, as some of the board's land was going to be used for the new terminal station. The station was closed sometime between 1929 and 1932, and was later replaced by Alexandra Halt railway station on the new railway line going to Tanjong Pagar.
