= Newton railway station, Singapore =

Former railway station in Singapore

Newton
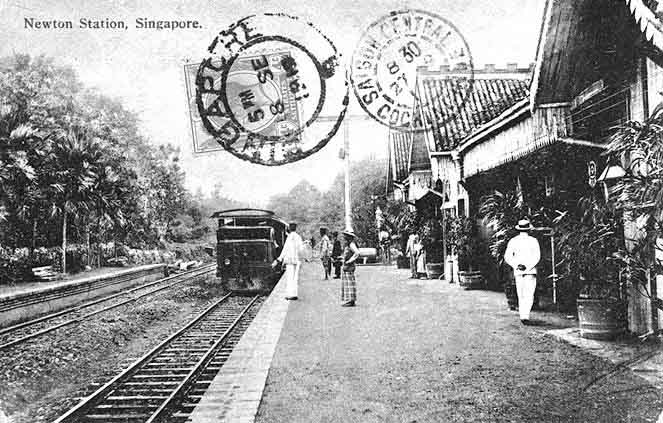
- Postcard c. 1919

General information
- Location: Singapore
- Coordinates: 1°18′51.59″N 103°50′19.68″E
- Platforms: 1

Other information
- Status: Demolished

History
- Opened: 1 January 1903; 123 years ago
- Closed: 2 May 1932; 94 years ago

Former services
Preceding station	Federated Malay States Railways	Following station
Cluny Road towards Woodlands	Singapore–Kranji Railway (1903–1932)	Tank Road towards Pasir Panjang
Location

Newton railway station was a railway station on the Singapore–Kranji Railway, serving Newton from 1903 to 1932.

== History ==
Originally to be named Scott's Road railway station, Newton railway station was opened to the public on 1 January 1903. It was located along Bukit Timah Road, as one of the first four railway stations in Singapore, with the Tank Road, Cluny Road, and Bukit Timah railway stations. The station was built next to Bukit Timah Canal and was near several swamps. The master-in-charge of the station was V. S. Chundrapillai. Pillar boxes were installed in both Newton station and Tank Road station later that year. By February 1906, the station was only serviced by rickshaws, as the tram lines did not extend to the area surrounding the station.

In November 1906, authorities began filling up the swampy ground around Newton station with earth from filter beds at the excavation at Bukit Timah Road. Such measures ensure the prevention of malaria spread, which had been prevalent at the swampy location of the station. A new siding was erected at the station to facilitate the deposition of the earth. By 1909, the loop lines and sidings of the station were lengthened to provide for the increased length of trains.

As it was decided that Tank Road station was unfit to be the terminus of the line, the Bukit Timah-Tank Road section was eventually abandoned. The line would instead deviate between Bukit Panjang and Bukit Timah, travelling down a different route, which ran along the west of the main town, to a new terminal station at Tanjong Pagar. Newton station, along with the rest of the Bukit Timah-Tank Road section of the line, was closed and abandoned on 2 May 1932, with the opening of the new terminus at Tanjong Pagar.

After the station was demolished, the Newton Circus Roundabout was built on the former station grounds.

== Incidents ==
On 2 November 1904, the engine of a train arriving at Newton station from Tank Road station took the main line instead of the platform line. A truck carrying coal, which had been attached to the engine, veered onto the platform line and was subsequently dragged by the engine across the opposite side, derailing and causing it to fall. The luggage van followed suit, with the third-class compartment partially dislodged. Fortunately, none of the passengers were injured. However, the derailment resulted in the track between Newton station and Tank Road station being blocked. The accident was caused by the movable guiding rail being out of place.

On 27 May 1905, Abdul Nazaar, the gateman of the level crossing at Chancery Lane, near Newton station, fell asleep and failed to open the gate for a train. This resulted in the engine colliding with the gate. However, the train did not sustain any damage. Nazaar was charged with neglecting his duty and endangering the safety of passengers of the railway, on 1 June 1905.

On 10 November 1912, a man named Hamid crashed his car into the railway gate at the crossing near Newton station. A car wheel went over the foot of Gunda Singh, the gatekeeper, who was later admitted to a hospital. Hamid was charged with driving recklessly, injuring Gunda Singh, and mischief by damaging the gate on 11 November.
