= People's Park railway station =

Former railway station in Singapore

People's Park

General information
- Location: Singapore
- Coordinates: 1°17′10.7″N 103°50′30.3″E
- Platforms: 2

Other information
- Status: Demolished

History
- Opened: 1 April 1908; 118 years ago
- Closed: Between 1929 and 1932

Former services
| Preceding station | Federated Malay States Railways | Following station |
|---|---|---|
| Tank Road towards Woodlands | Singapore–Kranji Railway (1903–1932) | Borneo Wharf towards Pasir Panjang |
Location

People's Park railway station was a railway station which served the People's Park area on the Singapore–Kranji Railway from 1 April 1908 to between 1929 and 1932.

== History ==
People's Park railway station was opened on 1 April 1908. It served as the new southern terminus of the passenger line, after Borneo Wharf and Pasir Panjang stations were closed to passenger service that same day. The station was built on Park Road, next to Pearl's Hill Road, near Tanjong Pagar, at the foot of Pearl's Hill. In October 1912, the station's ticket-stamping machine had to be replaced, as it was stolen for an unknown reason.

As the line from Pasir Panjang station to Tank Road station did not generate enough revenue, it was closed to passenger traffic sometime before 1919, only carrying freight.

As it was decided that Tank Road station was unfit to be the terminus of the line, it was decided that the Bukit Timah-Tank Road section of the line would be abandoned, and the line would instead deviate in between Bukit Panjang and Bukit Timah, travelling down a different route which ran along the west of the main town, to a new terminal station at Tanjong Pagar. Pasir Panjang station, as well as rest of the Tank Road–Pasir Panjang line was negotiated off to the Singapore Harbour Board, as some of the board's land was going to be used for the new terminal station. The station was closed sometime between 1929 and 1932, along with the rest of the extension.

After the station was demolished, the former station grounds were used as the padang for the Sikh Police Barracks. As of 2022, the former site of the railway station is being occupied by the Pearl's Hill Care Home.
