= Singapore–Kranji Railway =

Former railway line in Singapore

The Singapore–Kranji Railway, also known as the Singapore Government Railway or simply the Singapore Railway, was the first commercial railway line on the island of Singapore. It ran in a north–south direction between the city of Singapore and Woodlands, before heading to Johor in Peninsular Malaysia. It was in service between 1903 and 2011.

== History ==
=== Early developments ===
External image
- Map of the proposed New Harbour Railway.

Plans to build Singapore's first railway line had been mooted as early as 1869 by W. J. du Port, an engineer of the Tanjong Pagar Dock Company. The proposed line was estimated to cost 200,000 Straits dollars. In 1874, Andrew Clarke, then governor of the Straits Settlements, announced his support for a proposed private railway line named the New Harbour Railway.

=== Initial openings ===
In 1889, governor Cecil Clementi Smith proposed building a railway line in Singapore, which he later in 1898, unveiled to be possible soon. In August 1899, a 24.85 km (15.44 mi) Singapore–Johore Straits Railway was approved to be built. The line was estimated to cost 881,440 dollars, of which 68,000 dollars was set down for the cost of land acquisition. Three sites were proposed for the line's southern terminus–Dhoby Ghaut, near Kandang Kerbau, and along Tank Road near River Valley, the last of which was chosen. Groundbreaking of the line occurred at Back Road at the foot of Fort Canning Hill on 16 April 1900. In 1901, the Federated Malay States Railways (FMSR) was established, which would be responsible for the construction of the railway, and unite the fragmented railway systems of Malaya.

The Singapore–Kranji Railway opened on 1 January 1903, and ran from Singapore station to Bukit Timah. William Tearle, an Englishman, was appointed the first manager. On 10 April that same year, the line was extended from Bukit Timah to Woodlands. On 21 January 1907, the line was extended from Singapore station, by then had been renamed to Tank Road station, to Pasir Panjang. Around that same time, the line was reported to be struggling financially, as the prediction of large migration of citizens from the colonial town to Bukit Timah did not happen. On 1 April 1908, the line between Tank Road and Pasir Panjang closed to passenger service, and remained so as of November 1923. People's Park station opened that same day to serve as the passenger line's new southern terminus.

=== Connection to Johor and line deviation ===
In 1909, Johor Bahru station was opened as part of the Johore State Railway in British Malaya. However, the lack of a bridge between Singapore island and Malaya meant a ferry service was required to link Johor Bahru and Woodlands. In May 1911, the railway was reported to have earned 297,327 dollars that fiscal year, a 25% increase from the previous year, transporting over half a million passengers.

In 1923, the Johor–Singapore Causeway opened for cargo train crossings on 17 September, then to passenger trains on 1 October. Woodlands station, which was located east of the causeway, ceased operation on the same day to allow for a more direct route to and from the causeway. It was then rebuilt on the realigned route west of the causeway, ahead of the causeway's official opening in June 1924. That same year, Mandai station was relocated on 3 February.

In February 1928, plans for the deviation of the railway line were announced, with a new southern terminus at Tanjong Pagar. In May 1929, the deviation was discussed during a meeting of the Finance Committee of the Federal Council in Kuala Lumpur. The alignment of the deviation was formally announced the following month by engineer K. L. Haskins of the FMSR. The line between Tank Road and Bukit Timah stations permanently closed on 2 May 1932. By then, Holland Road, People's Park, Borneo Wharf and Pasir Panjang stations had already ceased operation years prior. The deviation opened the next day. By October 1935, most of the infrastructure on the old line had been demolished.

=== Contemporary period, railbus service and closure ===
In 1948, the Singapore–Kranji Railway, along with all the railways in Malaya previously managed by the FMSR, were reorganised to now be managed by the Malayan Railway, later renamed to Keretapi Tanah Melayu (KTM). In November 1955, to encourage use of the railway due to low passengers count, free lorry services were introduced to connect residents to select stations during peak hours. Fares were also decreased by about 5 cents per mile.

In December 1980, a railbus service was proposed to operate on the railway track, as a cheaper alternative to heavy rail. Railbuses, with a capacity of 260 passengers per vehicle, were loaned for a trial run in July 1984. The one-month trial, later extended by another month, was conducted on the line between Woodlands and Tanglin Halt. The service was close to capacity for most days within 2 weeks of operation, and by the end of the trial in October, the railbus service was being considered to become permanent. A second round of trial service ran for three months from January 1986, before being extended by another three months to June. Official service was scheduled to begin in March 1988, before being delayed to July.

On 8 September 1998, the railbus service officially commenced. The service ran from Tanjong Pagar to Kulai, Johor, Malaysia, at a speed of up to 100 km/h (62 mph). A total of 40 railbuses were procured at a sum of RM15 million. Four services began at Tanjong Pagar each day, costing S$1 for a trip to Johor Bahru, or S$2 to Kulai. An extension of the service to Kluang, Johor was proposed to begin by the end of that year. In 1992, a route between Tanjong Pagar and Senai was also proposed, which would begin service in September that year. Railbus services operated until at least 1997.

In August 2000, the then-prime minister of Malaysia Mahathir Mohamad proposed an underground tunnel to connect Johor Bahru with a new railway station at Kranji, superseding Tanjong Pagar as the new southern terminus of the KTM West Coast railway line. The plan, however, did not come to fruition. In 2010, the Singapore and Malaysian governments formally agreed to return the Malaysian-owned 26 km (16 mi) long KTM railway land back to Singapore, in exchange for joint development of the land totalling to an area of 270 ha (670 acres). On 1 July 2011, Tanjong Pagar and Bukit Timah stations ceased operation, and the southern terminus of the KTM West Coast railway line was relocated to Woodlands Train Checkpoint. By January 2012, all of the railway track had been removed.

== Private branch lines ==
=== Admiralty military railway ===
In June 1925, orders were given to construct an extension of the railway from Woodlands to His Majesty's Naval Base at Sembawang, which was underway by September 1926.

=== Alexandra railway ===
The Alexandra railway served Brickworks Industrial Estate. In May 1949, work began to extend the railway to Archipelago Brewery, located at present-day Anchorpoint shopping mall. The extension included a bridge across Alexandra Road, with a station located at present-day IKEA Alexandra. A locomotive shed also served military trains.

On 6 March 1979, an empty train crashed through a crossing gate at Jalan Bukit Merah.

Today, the site of the former railway tracks north of Jalan Bukit Merah is occupied by Rumah Tinggi Eco Park and a car park.

=== Jurong railway ===
Opened on 4 March 1966, the Jurong railway served Jurong Industrial Estate.

=== Tanglin railway ===
Branching from Tanglin railway station, the Tanglin railway served Ayer Rajah Industrial Estate. Similar to the Alexandra railway, military trains were stored in a locomotive shed on this line.

== Stations ==
=== 1903–1932 ===
External image
- 1924 map of the Singapore–Kranji Railway.

Station	Images	Opened	Closed
Woodlands (1st)		10 April 1903	1 October 1923
Woodlands (2nd)		1924	—N/a
Mandai		1908 (Note: Mandai station did not initially open for passenger service until sometime after 1911.)	—N/a
Bukit Panjang		10 April 1903	—N/a
Bukit Timah (1st)		1 January 1903	2 May 1932
Holland Road		16 July 1903	10 March 1930
Cluny Road		1 January 1903	2 May 1932
Newton		1 January 1903	2 May 1932
Tank Road		1 January 1903	2 May 1932
People's Park		1 April 1908	1912–1924
Borneo Wharf (Note: Referred to as Keppel Harbour station in the 1924 map.)		21 January 1907	1924–1932
Pasir Panjang		21 January 1907	1924–1932

=== 1932–2011 ===
External image
- 1933 map of Singapore, including the Singapore–Kranji Railway stations.

Station	Images	Opened	Closed
Woodlands (2nd)		—N/a	1933–1937
Woodlands (3rd)		1 August 1998	—N/a
Kranji		1945–1952	Unknown
Mandai		—N/a	1933–1937
Bukit Panjang		—N/a	1955–1960
Bukit Timah (2nd)		3 May 1932	1 July 2011
Tanglin		3 May 1932	1961–1984
Alexandra Halt		3 May 1932	20 March 1934
Tanjong Pagar		3 May 1932	1 July 2011

- Note: A 1955 article mentioned a station at Telok Blangah.

== See also ==
- Malaysia–Singapore Points of Agreement of 1990
- Rail Corridor (Singapore)
- Duxton Plain Park
