= Tearle =

Tearle is a surname. Notable people with the surname include:

- Conway Tearle (1878–1938), Anglo-American stage actor, stepson of Osmond
- Godfrey Tearle (1884–1953), British actor, son of Osmond
- Osmond Tearle (1852–1901), British actor
- William Tearle (1852–1922), British railway manager

== See also ==
- Earle (surname)
- Searle (surname)
