= William Tearle =

British railway manager

William Tearle (1852 - 23 March 1922) was the first manager of the Singapore Railway from its opening in 1903 to his retirement in 1907.

== Early life ==
Tearle was born in 1852 in England, and when he was young, went to the West Indies, spending three years in sugar planting.

== Career ==
Tearle then returned to England and became an employee of the Leeds Northern Railway, later becoming the stationmaster at Keighley and Halifax. After spending 21 years working for the Leeds Northern Railway, he went to Malaysia and became the traffic superintendent of the Selangor Government Railway.

Tearle was appointed the manager of the Singapore Railway in 1903, during which he lived along Fort Canning Road, near terminal Tank Road station. Tearle retired from his position in November 1907.

== Personal life ==
In April 1880, Tearle wrote from an address in Cambridge Street, St Neots, to Charles Darwin about the conflicting accounts of man's creation in On the Origin of Species and in Genesis. Darwin replied saying that he was unable to assist.

Tearle married Eleanor Todd (1860–1935) in 1888.

After his retirement in November 1907, the couple moved to Bedford.

Tearle died on 23 March 1922 due to his deteriorating health, while his wife died on 26 December 1935 in Yorkshire.
