= Anchorpoint =

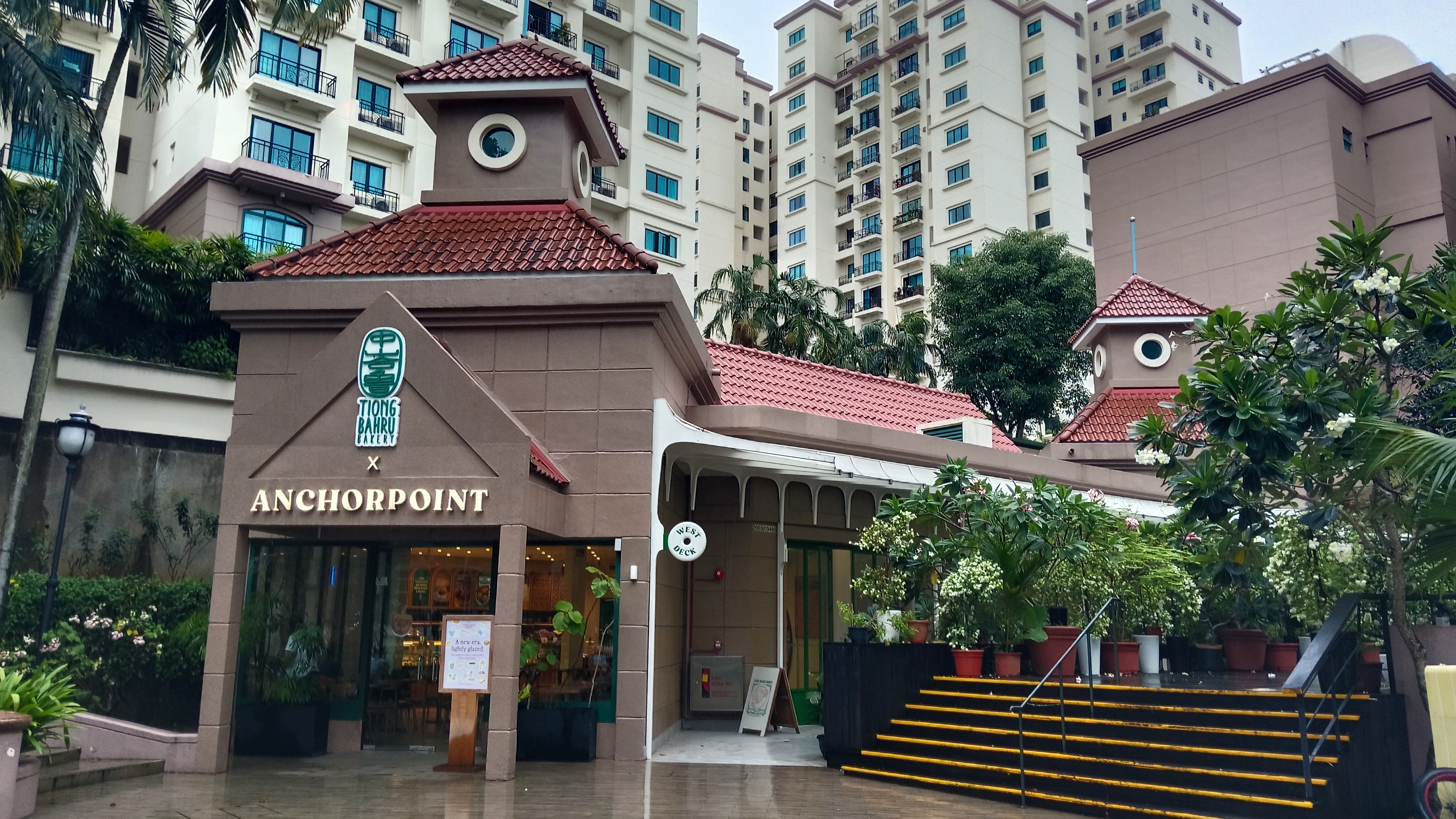
- West-facing entrance to Anchorpoint
- Location: Queenstown, Singapore
- Coordinates: 1.2887°N 103.8051°E
- Address: 370 Alexandra Rd, Singapore 159953
- Opened: 1997
- Developer: Frasers Property
- Num. of stores: 52
- Num. of anchor tenants: ironically none
- Floors: 3 (1 basement level)
- Parking: 1
- Website: www.anchorpoint.com.sg

Anchorpoint is a shopping mall located in Queenstown, Singapore. First opened in 1997, the mall is built at the site of a former brewery, the Anchor Brewery, which was established in the 1930s. Nothing remains of the brewery with the exception of the two-storey brew master's office which has been incorporated into the shopping mall complex, all of which are owned by Frasers Property.

== History ==
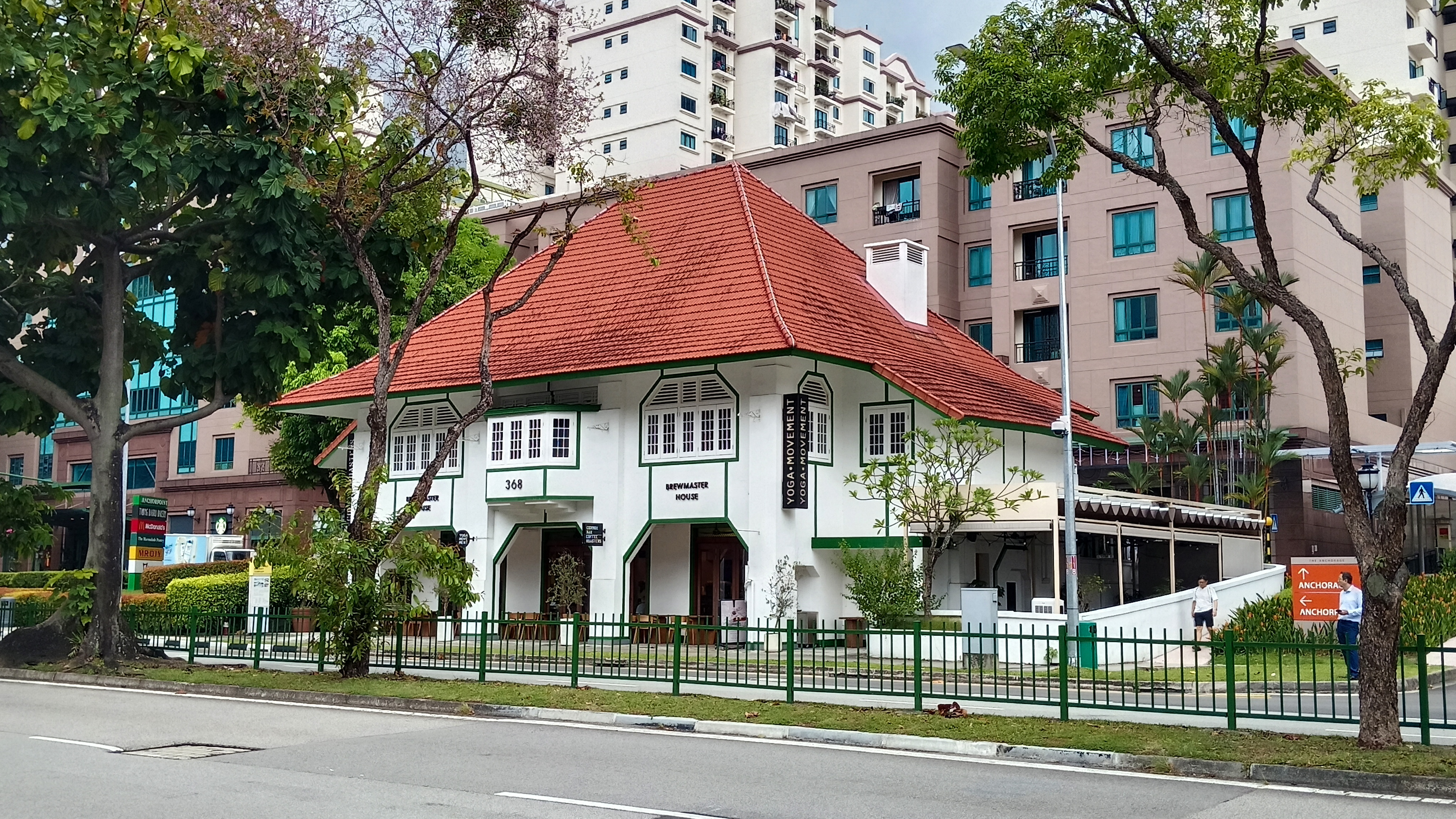
The preserved Brewmaster House that has been incorporated into Anchorpoint.

Originally, the site was where a beer brewery complex named Anchor Brewery once stood. Established in the 1930s by German businessmen under the Archipelago Brewery Company, it was strategically located next to the now defunct Alexandra Railway for the convenient transport of beer to sell. Most of the brewery including its factory and warehouse made way for redevelopments in the area, with the exception of the two-storey brew master's office that was preserved and gazetted for conservation on 12 February 1993. The mall itself, which stands on the site of the factory, was opened in 1997.

== Architecture ==
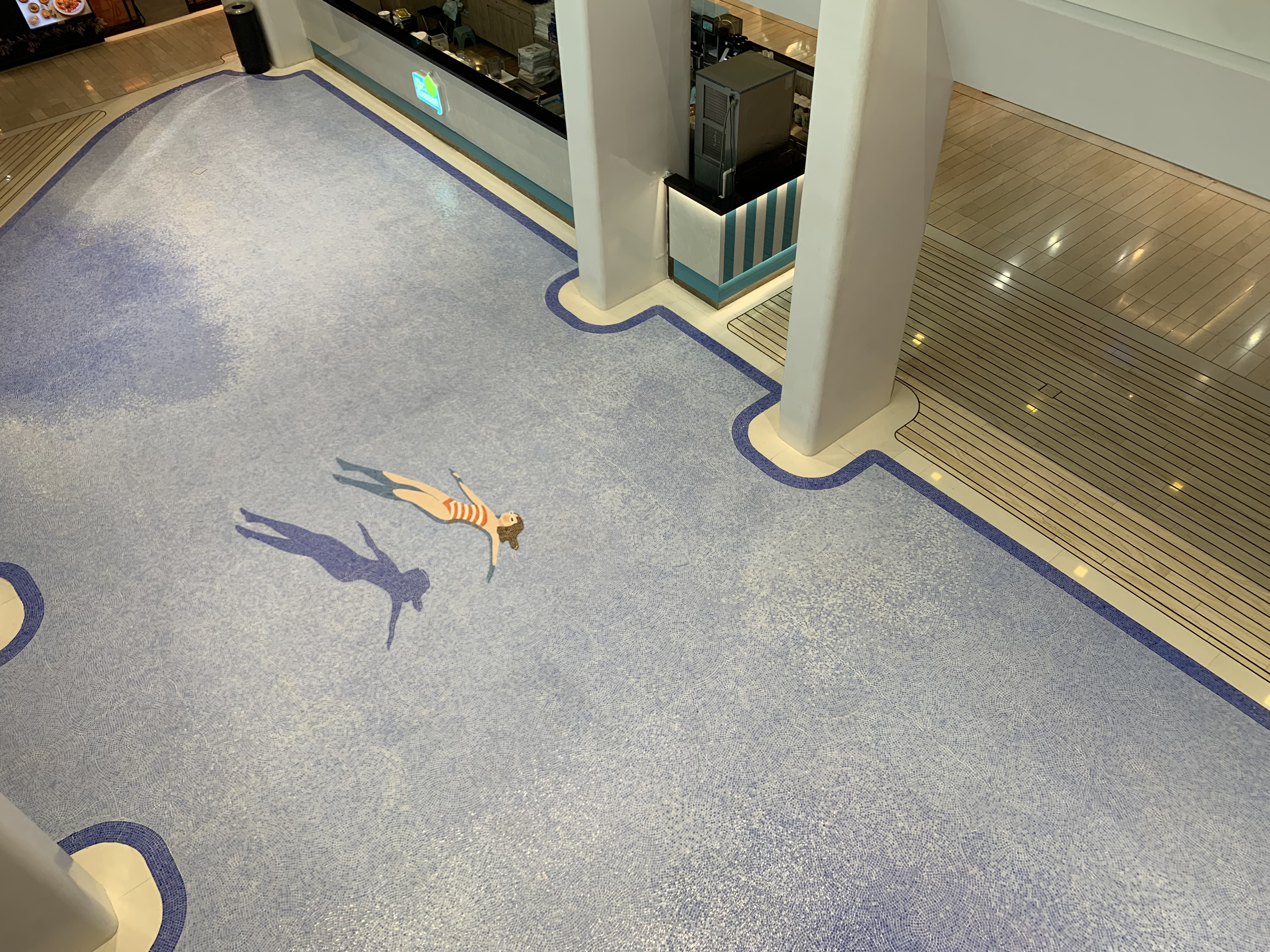
Decorated tiled floor of the main basement level in the mall

The Anchorpoint complex is built in a modern architectural style that incorporates elements of classical 1920–1930s local architectural styles, such as geometric patterns and pyramidal roofs. There are architectural features that evoke a marine feel, for example the arches that are intended to mimic the hull of a ship and nautical themed blue tiles for flooring in the central space.

The Brewmaster House, a preserved two-storey building that formerly served as a residence for the brew masters of the former Anchor Brewery, was designed by German architect Heinrich Rudolf Arbenz, who had also designed the Dutch Pavillion at Tanglin. The first floor of the building has been converted into a restaurant, while the second floor has been repurposed as a recreational area. The building has a pyramidal tiled roof which is made of red bricks, while the building itself is predominately white coloured.

The main Anchorpoint mall building has two retail levels and a basement car park. It has 52 tenants, which comprise restaurants, eateries, utility stores, party stores, medical clinics and a Cold Storage supermarket.
