= Tank Road railway station =

Former train terminus in Singapore

Tank Road
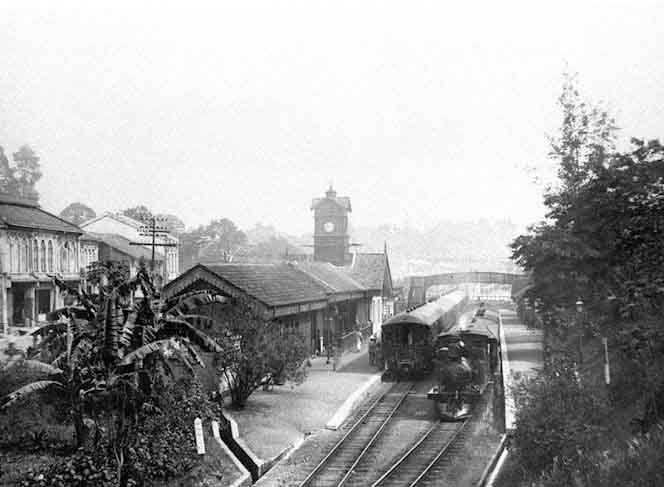
- The station in the 1900s

General information
- Location: Singapore
- Coordinates: 1°17′49.3″N 103°50′38.8″E
- Platforms: 2

Other information
- Status: Demolished

History
- Opened: 1 January 1903; 123 years ago
- Closed: 2 May 1932; 94 years ago

Former services
Preceding station	Federated Malay States Railways	Following station
Newton towards Woodlands	Singapore–Kranji Railway (1903–1932)	People's Park towards Pasir Panjang
Location

Tank Road railway station was a railway station along the Singapore–Kranji Railway, serving as its terminus from 1903 to 1907, and then again from around 1919 to the station's closure in 1932.

== History ==
Originally located along River Valley Road at the foot of Fort Canning Hill, the station was opened on 1 January 1903, under the name of Singapore Station, on the Singapore-Kranji Railway, the first railway line in Singapore. The station served as the terminus of the line, running services to Bukit Timah railway station, and later to Kranji and to Malaya. The station master occupied the Tan Yeok Nee House, after Tan Yeok Nee and his family moved out amid construction of the station. Pillar boxes were installed in both Tank Road station and Newton station later that year. The station was later relocated along Tank Road, and reopened on 1 May 1906. The old station was then turned into a goods yard, serving the new station.

An extension from the station to the docks at Pasir Panjang was completed on 17 January 1907, and opened to the public on 21 January 1907. The extension crossed Singapore River towards the docks, and ended at Pasir Panjang railway station, which was near the Alexandra Brickworks. In 1909, the loop lines and sidings of the station were lengthened to provide for the increased length of trains. By 1919, passenger services were cut back from Pasir Panjang to Tank Road, while the railway past Tank Road would only carry freight. In 1923, the Johor–Singapore Causeway was completed, opening to goods trains on 17 September 1923, and opening to passenger trains on 1 October 1923, allowing the Singapore-Kranji Railway to connect with the railways of Malaya easier. The highest passenger volume was on Sundays, as the causeway allowed easier access to gambling dens in Johor, which offered to pay for return fares, attracting gamblers from Singapore.

By the 1920s, the station was found to be unable to adequately serve as the terminal station in Singapore, with it being too small and outdated, and was often considered a nuisance. The station was also far from the centre of the city, forcing those who arrived at the station to take a rickshaw from the station to their destination. Several solutions were proposed, including the construction of a new station on Hill Street, along with a station hotel. The new station would have three platforms which would be 800 feet (240 m) long each, as opposed to the current 350-foot-long (110 m) platforms, and the station would have been constructed in two wings. This plan also included demolishing the level crossing at Tank Road, and would run around Fort Canning Hill. The line was also to be doubled to Woodlands. It was eventually decided that this proposal would be chosen to solve the issue. However, the plans for both the hotel and the doubling of the line were later dropped, and it was decided that the line would cut through Fort Canning Hill. It was also later decided that the new station would instead be in the same location as the previous station. Construction on the tracks eventually began, but stopped in 1921 due to a slump.

It was eventually decided that the Bukit Timah-Tank Road section of the line would be abandoned, and the line would instead deviate in between Bukit Panjang and Bukit Timah, travelling down a different route which ran along the west of the main town, to a new terminal station at Tanjong Pagar. Tank Road station, along with the rest of the Bukit Timah-Tank Road section of the line, was closed and abandoned on 2 May 1932, with the opening of the new terminus at Tanjong Pagar.

Demolishment of the station began in August 1933, and several badminton courts were built on the grounds of the former station soon after, with fields of lalang covering the rest of the grounds. Some remnants of the station remained till at least 1957. Several office buildings, such as the Rediffusion Building, as well as the Singapore Shopping Centre and the George Lee Motors Building were later built on the site. The former station grounds are currently being occupied by the Haw Par Centre. The goods yard that served the station was replaced by the King George V Jubilee Park, later renamed Fort Canning Park, the National Theatre, a public swimming pool, and the Van Kleef Aquarium.
