= Pasir Panjang railway station =

Former railway terminus in Singapore

Pasir Panjang

General information
- Location: Singapore
- Coordinates: 1.271778°N 103.80173°E
- Platforms: 2

Other information
- Status: Disused

History
- Opened: 21 January 1907; 119 years ago
- Closed: Between 1929 and 1932

Former services
Preceding station	Federated Malay States Railways	Following station
Borneo Wharf towards Woodlands	Singapore–Kranji Railway (1903–1932)	Terminus
Location

Pasir Panjang railway station, also known as Alexandra Road railway station or Passir Panjang railway station, was a railway station which served as the terminus of the Singapore–Kranji Railway from 1907 to 1932.

== History ==
Pasir Panjang railway station was opened to the public on 21 January 1907, as one of the two original railway stations on the 1907 extension of the Singapore-Kranji railway from Tank Road station, along with Borneo Wharf railway station. Despite the official name of the station being Pasir Panjang, the station board read Passir Panjang, and the tickets referred to the station as Alexandra Road. The station was built opposite Alexandra Road, serving the docks. The station was near the Alexandra Brickworks.

As the line from Pasir Panjang station to Tank Road station did not generate enough revenue, it was closed to passenger traffic on 1 April 1908, carrying only freight since then.

As it was decided that Tank Road station was unfit to be the terminus of the line, it was decided that the Bukit Timah-Tank Road section of the line would be abandoned, and the line would instead deviate in between Bukit Panjang and Bukit Timah, travelling down a different route which ran along the west of the main town, to a new terminal station at Tanjong Pagar. Pasir Panjang station, as well as rest of the Tank Road-Pasir Panjang line was negotiated off to the Singapore Harbour Board, as some of the board's land was going to be used for the new terminal station. The station was closed sometime between 1929 and 1932, and was later replaced by Alexandra Halt railway station on the new railway line going to Tanjong Pagar.
