= Woodlands railway station, Singapore =

Former train terminus in Singapore

Woodlands
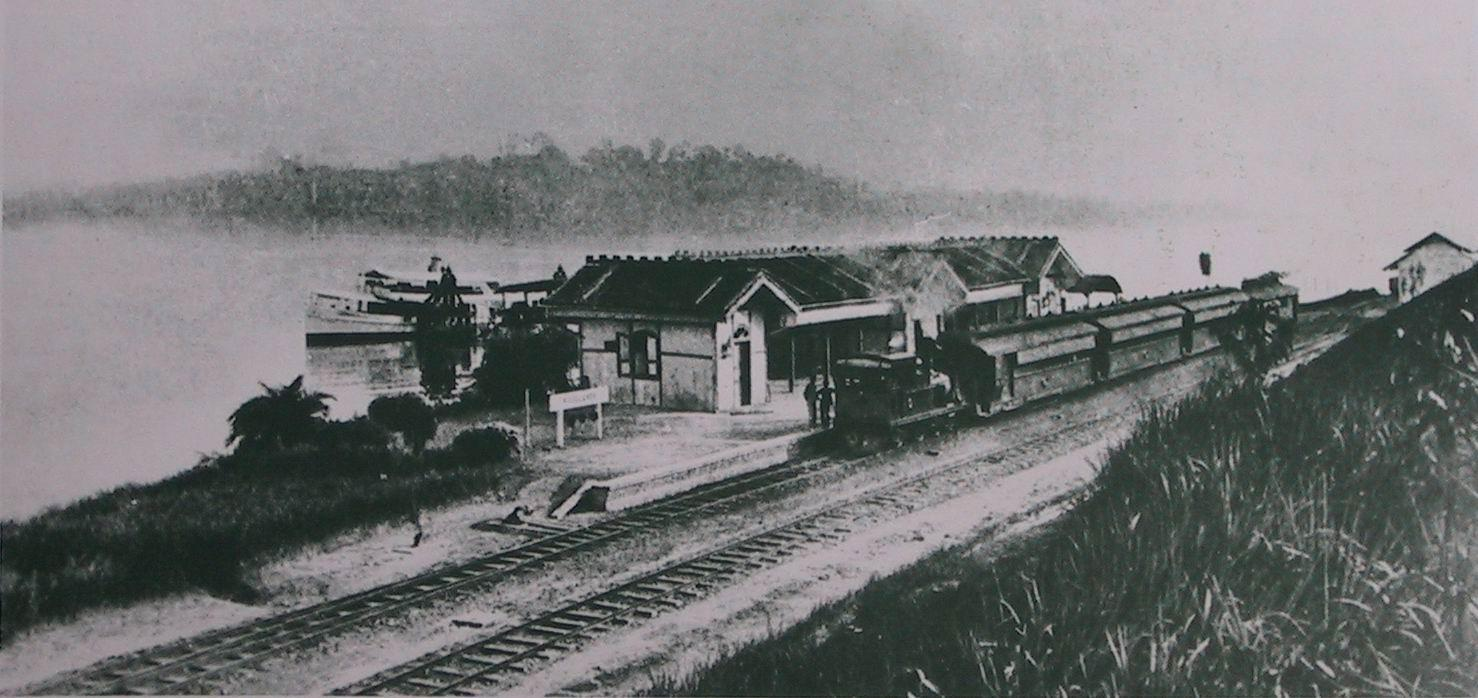
- The station c. 1910

General information
- Location: Singapore
- Platforms: 2

Other information
- Status: Demolished

History
- Opened: April 10, 1903; 123 years ago
- Closed: October 1, 1923; 102 years ago

Former services
Preceding station	Federated Malay States Railways	Following station
Terminus	Singapore–Kranji Railway (1903–1932)	Mandai towards Pasir Panjang

Woodlands railway station was a railway station on the Singapore–Kranji Railway which allowed passengers to access ferries bound for Johor from 1903 to 1923.

== History ==
Woodlands railway station was opened to the public on 10 April 1903 as the new northern terminus of the line, as part of the extension of the railway from Bukit Timah railway station, which also included a station at Bukit Panjang, which had not yet finished construction by the time the extension had opened. The station allowed for quicker and more convenient access to ferries, which were bound for Johor. The station replaced the bus, which previously ran the route. Despite being in close proximity to the nearby village of Kranji, there was no road connecting the station to the village, thus rendering it impossible for residents of Kranji to utilise the station. The station was serviced by a police station, which opened shortly after the opening of the station. The land surrounding the station was owned by the railway, and a rule was implemented in which entering the premises of the station would cost an extra five cents. This included the nearby piers, the police station, the post office box and the ticket office.

The station was not used often, as it was too far away from town. When the station first opened, many of the employees caught a severe illness and had to be sent to the hospital. The opening of Johor Bahru railway station likely lessened the passenger traffic in the station, as they replaced the ferries going to Johor.

The station was closed on 1 October 1923 and was later demolished, being replaced with a petrol station. The site of the former station was one of several possible locations for a railbus station for the railbus line that the Keretapi Tanah Melayu (KTM) planned to build in Singapore.
