= Federated Malay States Railways =

Former railway operator

Federated Malay States Railways (FMSR)
Overview
- Headquarters: Kuala Lumpur, Federated Malay States (now Malaysia)
- Locale: British Malaya (including Singapore)
- Dates of operation: 1901–1948
- Predecessor: Various state-level railways, including Perak Railway, Selangor Railway, Singapore Railway, Malacca Railway, Sungai Ujong Railway, Johore Railway, and other minor lines in British Malaya
- Successor: Malayan Railways

Technical
- Track gauge: Metre gauge (1,000 mm (3 ft 3 3/8 in))

The Federated Malay States Railways (FMSR) was a consolidated railway operator in British Malaya (present day Peninsular Malaysia and Singapore) during the first half of the 20th century. Named after the then recently formed Federated Malay States in 1896 and founded five years after the formation of the federation, the company acquired various railways that were developed separately in various parts of Malaya, and oversaw the largest expansion and integration of the colonial rail network encompassing the Federated Malay States, the Unfederated Malay States (except Trengganu) and the Straits Settlements, with lines spanning from Singapore in the south to Padang Besar (near the border with Siam) in the north.

== History ==
=== Predecessors ===
Until the formation of the FMSR, Malaya's railway systems were fragmented and concentrated in the commercially active west coast of the peninsula; none of the systems were originally intended for interstate travel, and were founded to fulfill specific purposes. By the end of the 19th century, Malaya had at least six separate railway companies:

- The Perak Government Railway in Perak, which was primarily tasked to serve tin mines within the state and operated two separate lines: The Taiping line between Parit Buntar and Port Weld, and another between Enggor and Teluk Anson.
- The Muar State Railway, a railway system in the district of Muar, Johore transporting agricultural goods and passengers.
- The Selangor Government Railway in Selangor, which was originally used to transport goods between Klang and Kuala Lumpur. By 1900, an extension of the line to Port Swettenham was only completed the year before, and a branch line through Kuala Lumpur (stopping at Sultan Street), Pudoh and the mining town of Ampang was operating for use in the transport of tin from Ampang.
- The Sungei Ujong Railway in Negeri Sembilan, which operated a line between Seremban and Port Dickson.
- The Singapore Government Railway in Singapore.
- The operator of the Prai-Bukit Mertajam line in Province Wellesley.
- A recommendation by Cecil Clementi Smith was also made in 1892 to link the interior of Pahang via a railway line to render the state accessible for economic development. The state favoured railway construction, but it was unable to do so due to the lack of funds.

=== Frank Swettenham and the founding of the FMSR ===
The formation of the Federated Malay States (FMS) in 1896 led to a centralisation of Residential power and improved co-ordination of development in the new founded federation. In the same year, the newly appointed residents-general of the FMS, Frank Swettenham, proposed a master plan to extend and connect railway networks within the FMS and Province Wellesley.

Swettenham's proposal encompassed three phases: The first was to be the construction of a "development" line towards the north that would connect Perak's railways with those of Selangor's and the Province Wellesley's, while running through valuable but underdeveloped land in between; the second phase consisted of an extension of the line to Kuala Lipis, Pahang's then administrative capital, to promote the development of the state's mineral industry; the third section was to be a southwards extension from the Selangor Railway's southern terminus in Cheras to Seremban, connecting Selangor Railway to Sungei Ujong Railway and providing direct connectivity from Prai to the north to Port Dickson to the south.

Swettenham's proposal was approved by the Colonial Office under the justification wide-ranging transport linkages would allow access to land for use in agriculture and diversify the region's sources of revenue, while improving administrative efficiency by linking the FMS with the Straits Settlements (widening the scope of the plan to include additional linkages to the Straits Settlements of Malacca and Singapore).

Construction of the connections began in 1897 and concluded in 1903 with the Prai-Port Dickson line completed. The FMSR was founded in 1901 in the process, combining assets of Perak Railway and Selangor Railway as the two railway networks were the first to be connected. Management of stations and railways within the two networks were turned over to the FMSR, while locomotives originally operated by the two companies were absorbed into the FMSR and renumbered in July 1901. The amalgamation of other railway companies into the FMSR would follow in the coming years.

=== Extensions ===
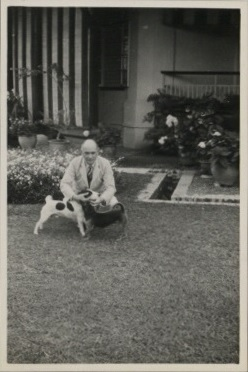
David Henry Elias, General Manager of the Federated Malay States Railways, 1935

While the Prai-Port Dickson line was completed in 1903, extensions were still required to connect the network with Malacca and Singapore. The extension southwards led to the formation of two short-lived railway companies largely intended to oversee the construction of lines within their state borders.

The Malacca Government Railway (MGR) was awarded a concession by the state government for the construction a railway line between Tampin and Malacca Town, as well as an extension of the main line between Malacca's state border with Negeri Sembilan that leads to Gemas. Upon completion of the lines, the MGR was absorbed into the FMSR in 1905.

In 1904, the Johore state government signed an agreement with Amalgamation.

=== World War II and the end of the FMSR ===
The outbreak of World War II was marked with the Japanese Empire's invasion of Malaya and Singapore in 1941 and 1942, which saw the entirety of the FMSR network falling under Japanese control. The system suffered minimal damage during the initial invasion and bombing runs, but saw the dismantling and closure of minor branch lines during the occupation for construction materials for the Thailand-Burma Railway. Similarly, several FMSR locomotives were transferred for use at the Thailand-Burma Railway during the period, but were eventually returned after the war.

Following the end of the war, the FMSR continued to operate as an entity for three years under the British Military Administration and Malayan Union, before it is renamed in 1948 as the Malayan Railway Administration (also known simply as the Malayan Railway, or MR) as the Malayan Union is reinstituted as the Federation of Malaya. The Malayan Railway would in turn be formally rebranded with a Malay translation of the name, Keretapi Tanah Melayu, in 1962.

== Design ==
=== Railway ===
Years before the formation of the FMSR, an agreement was met in which new lines built by state governments are to be laid out in the same metre gauge under the expectation that the separate lines will eventually be connected to each other. Consequentially, the system would further expand exclusively in metre gauge under the FMSR. Much of the FMSR network were single-track lines with passing loops situated near or at stations. Exceptions can be found in and around larger stations and cities, where higher rail traffic necessitates double tracks or more.

Railway signalling was entirely mechanical and manually operated; the entirety of the system utilised semaphore signals and each station with multiple tracks are equipped with a lever frame housed within the station building or a separate shed. While rare and almost exclusively found in portions of the system with larger numbers of tracks, dedicated signal boxes were also built.

In its early year the railway was also essential for communication. In addition to mail transported in baggage cars, telephone wires would typically parallel railway lines, which relayed voice communication and telegraphs between railway stations and nearby post offices.

=== Crossings and tunnels ===
The predominant number of crossings along the FMSR were almost entirely composed of single-track beam bridges (for shorter crossings) or truss bridges (for longer crossings) composed of cast iron and steel spans laid on brick piers and abutments. While much of the track was laid out along cuttings, several tunnels were also excavated near Seremban, Bukit Berapit, Sungai Mengkuang, Ulu Temiang, Dabong and Kuala Geris.

While rare, road viaducts crossing under or over the railway were similarly built throughout FMSR's history, typically in the form of brick arch or truss bridges in areas with high rail and road traffic. For the rest of the system, level crossings were laid instead.

== Engineering facilities ==
=== Stations ===
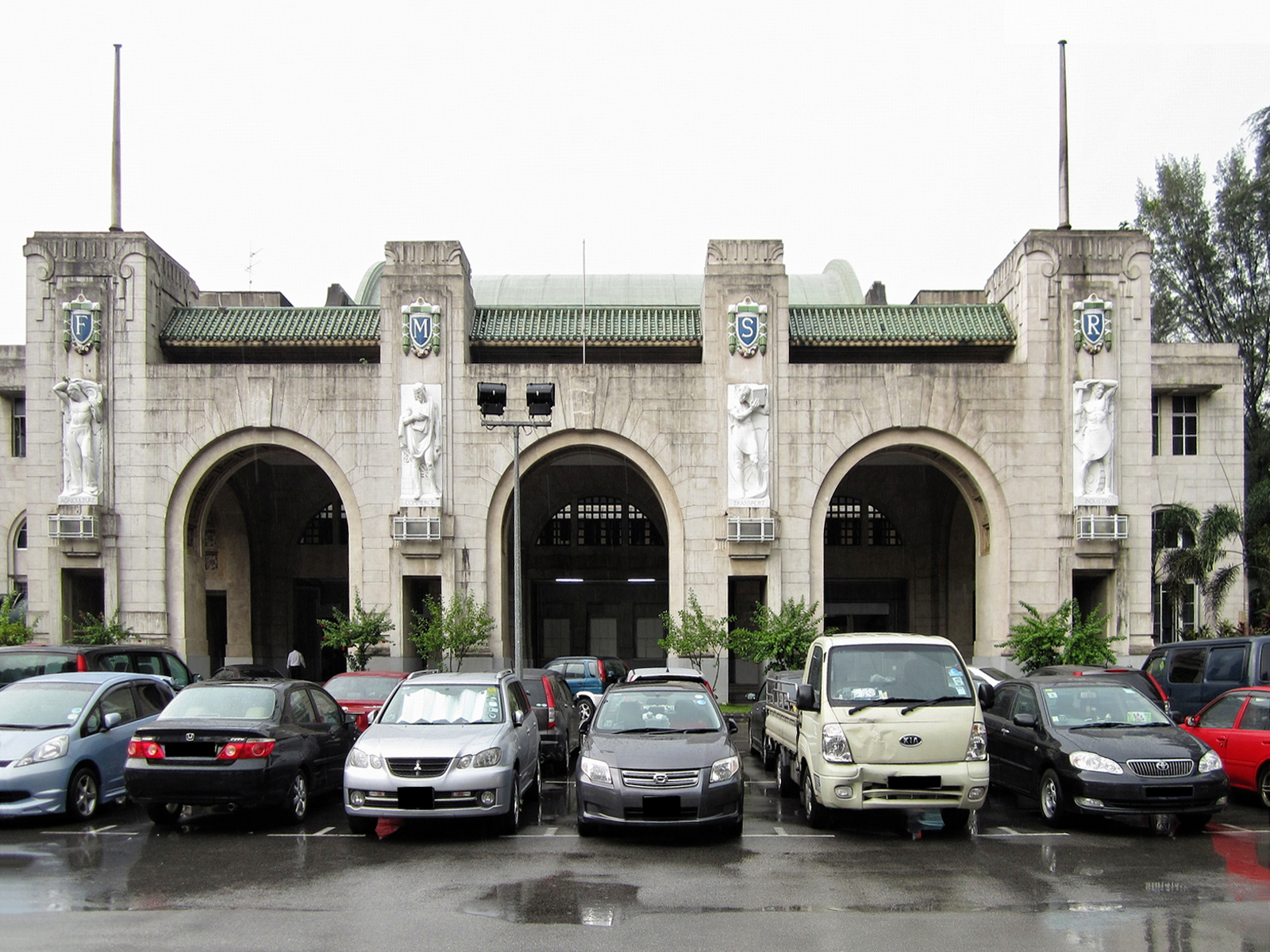
Tanjong Pagar railway station in Singapore, with "FMSR" emblazoned on the facade

Railway stations constructed along the FMSR network composed of two forms.

One, which characterised the vast majority of stops, are vernacular timber structures with sizes that varied based on the size of the towns they served based on construction methods of past state railways; larger timber stations are typically exemplified by longer platforms and lengthier station buildings designed to house communications, signalling control, luggage handling and station management, while lesser halts are often identifiable by small timber shelters (if any) and short platforms. Despite their simplistic constructions, many of the stations buildings were typically adorned in traditional fashion with wooden carvings and cast-iron decors. Larger timber stations are also usually equipped with railway quarters and maintenance facilities in their immediate vicinity.

The other form dot larger towns and cities. Originally allocated with similarly constructed timber stations, increased ridership often necessitated the construction of larger, grander stations constructed of sturdier materials and varying architectural styles. Among the stations built in grander styles include the Indo-Saracenic Revival Kuala Lumpur station (1911), the late-Edwardian Baroque Ipoh station (1917), and the Art Deco Johore Baharu station (1932) and Tanjong Pagar station in Singapore (1932). Lesser grand stations (some dating from before the FMSR), including Kelang, Pudoh, Seremban and Alor Setar are architecturally similar to larger timber stations but are distinguishable by more sophisticated station building layouts, masonry construction, additional ornamentation, and larger numbers of platforms.

The FMSR "station" in George Town, Penang (built 1907, later known as the "Malayan Railway Building" and "Wisma Kastam"), which administered railway operations in the north of Malaya, was also cited as a FMSR stop despite lacking a railway connection; the building housed ticketing facilities and railway administrative offices, but train rides from George Town required passengers boarding Railway Ferry Streamers that cross the Penang Strait from Weld Quay to Prai Junction (prior to the completion the Tunku Abdul Rahman Bridge that led to Butterworth supplanting Prai as a railway stop to George Town in 1967).

=== Workshops, depots and freight management ===
During early consolidation the FMSR would inherit many of former state railways depots, workshops and yards located around major stations and junctions, which were eventually downgraded into minor depots while centralised workshops charged with more important maintenance duties were constructed in specific regions. The largest of the new workshops was the Central Workshops in Sentol, Selangor; completed in 1905, it occupied a large plot close to the town and employed around 5,000 employees in its heyday, building railroad cars, fabricating railway parts, and performing maintenance on traction units. Other major depots were constructed in Prai and Gemas during FMSR's existence.

As the FMSR was an essential shipping channel to and from the interior of Malaya, some stations serving sea ports and commercial and industrial centres doubled as goods stations, managing tin and rubber shipments alongside other essential goods; such stations are typically complemented with godowns and marshalling/goods yards of varying sizes.

== Headquarters ==
Throughout its existence the FMSR has headquartered in Kuala Lumpur, but has operated in two different locations and three different buildings. The first FMSR site was situated in front of a major marshalling yard in the city near the Kuala Lumpur padang (present-day Dataran Merdeka), close to the Federated Malay States administration building. The original 1896 headquarters building was a spartan single-storey structure which served briefly before being replaced by a more ornate, Neo-Mughal double storey counterpart by 1905 in lieu with the surrounding architecture of the padang buildings. The second building would similarly see brief use as the FMSR would eventually move in 1917 to a larger, dedicated Railway Administration Building at Victoria Road, styled similarly in Neo-Mughal architecture and fronting the then newly completed Kuala Lumpur railway station. Both the second and third headquarters were designed by Arthur Benison Hubback, a chief draughtsman of Selangor public works department notable for the design of various municipal buildings in the Federated Malay States.

The second and third FMSR headquarters survive to date, the former subsequently housing various occupants before serving as the National Textile Museum and the latter continuously housing successive rail operators in Malaya and Peninsular Malaysia after the dissolution of the FMSR, including the Malayan Railway Administration and Keretapi Tanah Melayu.

== Rolling stock ==
=== Locomotives ===
As the FMSR first grew through mergers of existing state railway operators, the majority of its locomotive fleet during its first decade were merely absorbed from merged railway companies and renumbered. The FMSR began ordering its own locomotives by 1907, continuing to do so up to the Japanese invasion of Malaya in World War II.

Virtually all locomotives operated by the FMSR were steam locomotives manufactured by various builders in the United Kingdom. The locomotives were also known to assume all-black liveries throughout the existence of the FMSR, with the exception of the Johore Railway, which used Catalan blue.

=== FMSR Class A ===
==== Old A (1901–1933) ====
The FMSR Class A was the first designated series of locomotives in use by the FMSR. Consisted of 18 4-4-0T tank locomotives originally purchased by numerous state railways, the locomotives served as the FMSR's backbone fleet before the arrival of newer FMSR-ordered locomotives.

The Class A was designated in July 1901 for 12 locomotives originally assigned for both the Perak Railway and Selangor Railway and manufactured between 1884 and 1898, consisting of 11 from manufactured by the Hunslet Engine Company and one from the Selangor Railway produced by Neilson & Company. The Class A designation was further assigned to two 1904 Hunslet locomotives from the Malacca Railway in 1905, and four 1901–1903 Singapore Railway Hunslet locomotives in 1912.

Several Class A Selangor Railway locomotives were known to have been converted to run on oil rather than firewood to cut cost, years before the formation of the FMSR Class A. In addition, the outer cylinders of the Class A were rebuilt with a dimension of 11" by 16" from the original 10" by 16".

The Class A was gradually retired beginning the 1920s when new locomotives were introduced into the FMSR network. From 1912 onwards, certain Class As were also transferred to the Construction Department; FMSR 71 (Malacca Railway 2) was sold to Siam for use in coal mining assignments in 1924. The last Class A, FMSR 34 (Perak Railway 19), was withdrawn in 1933.

==== New A (1941–1946) ====
Encompassing only three 1928 Hunslet single engine 0-6-0T OCs, the "new" FMSR Class A was originally delivered to Singapore for use in the construction of the Sembawang Naval Base in 1929, and remained stored in the base after its construction was completed. In 1941, the FMSR acquired the locomotives, reintroducing the Class A designation for the locomotives. When introduced in 1941, the FMSR had retire the last original Class A locomotive, allowing the designation to be reused for a new series of locomotives.

The locomotives were only briefly used, surviving World War II, before renumbered by the FMSR in 1946 and sold to the Singapore Harbour Board in September of that year.

=== FMSR Class B ===
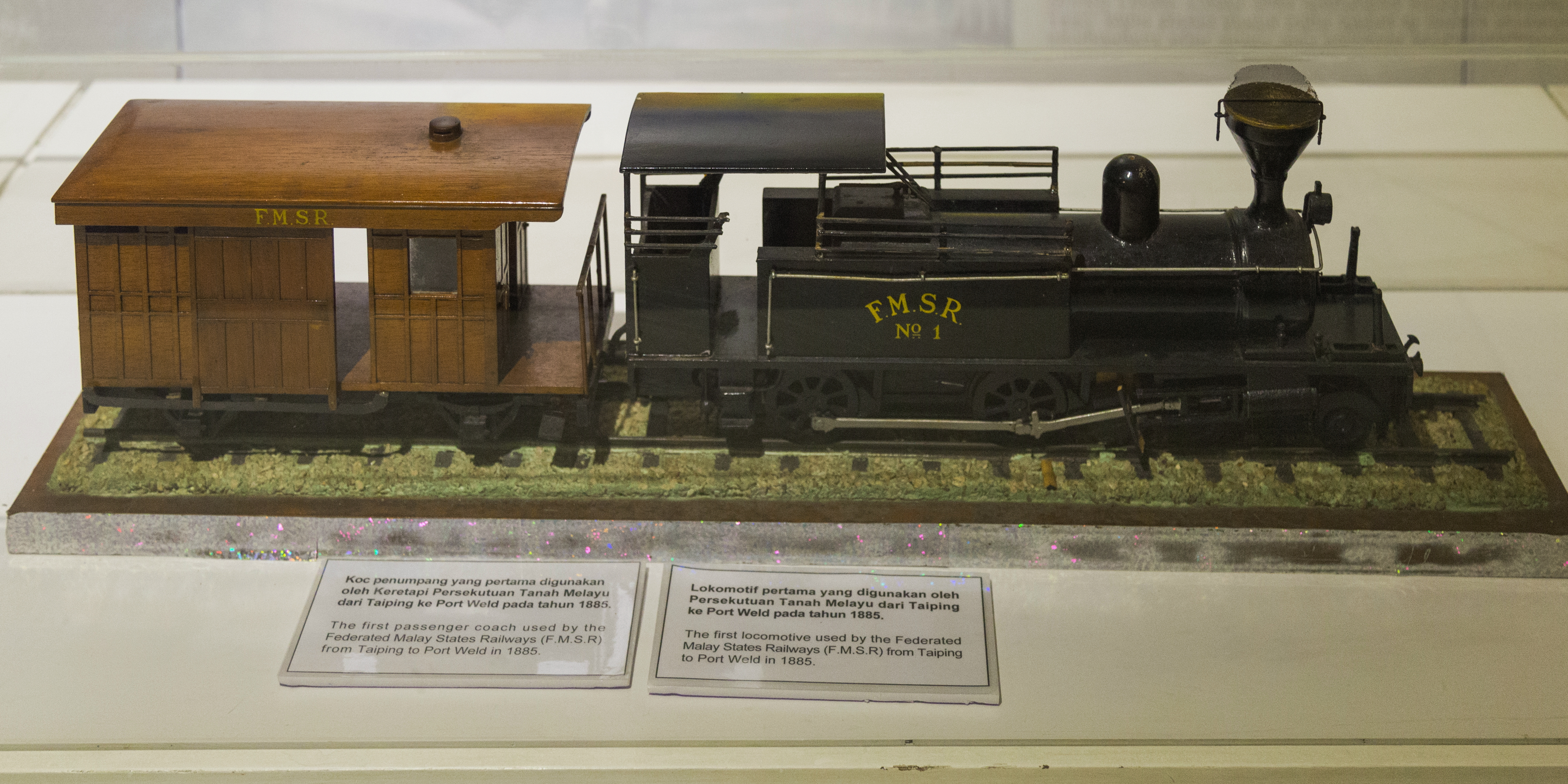
Scale model of Perak Railway No. 6 (later designated as an FMSR Class B) and a Perak Railway brake van circa 1890, National Museum

The 4-4-0T FMSR Class B locomotives were heavier, more powerful versions of the original Class A, with extended tanks. Also originated from local state railways, the series was, however, made up of a smaller number of locomotives, compared to the Class A, with only seven.

Like the Class A, the Class B was introduced in 1901 with the redesignation of the two Perak Railway locomotives, one from Hunslet, and another from Hawthorn Leslie. In 1910, the Class B fleet would see another addition, another Hunslet locomotive from the Johore Railway, followed by another three from Singapore Railway (two Hunslets and one Hawthorn Leslie) and two Hunslets from Johore Railway in 1912.

Class B locomotives were retired as new locomotives were delivered for the FMSR. While four Class B locomotives were removed from the active fleet during the 1920s with the last Class B withdrawn in 1932, three others were sold to the Malayan Collieries in 1923 and 1925.

=== FMSR Class C ===
==== Old C (1901–1928) ====
With seven originally built between 1893 and 1894, FMSR Class C locomotives were essentially 4-4-0T Class B locomotives with additional four-wheel tenders. As were other pre-FMSR locomotives, the Class Cs were absorbed from a state railway company, specifically, the Perak Railway, between 1901 and 1903. The Class Cs consisted of two locomotives from Neilson, three from Kitson & Company, and two from Hawthorn Leslie. All Class Cs were known to feature outer cylinders measuring 12" by 18", 3' 3" driving wheels, and 140 pounds of boiler pressure.

In 1907, the two Class C Hawthorn Leslie locomotives were passed to the then independent Johore Railway, two years before the opening of the state's line in 1909, and returned to the FMSR in 1912. All Class C locomotives would later be remove from service and scrapped between 1924 and 1928.

==== New C (1929–1970s) ====
By 1929, all original Class C locomotives were removed from active service, allowing the Class C designation to be reassigned to a new series of locomotives. The "new" FMSR Class C locomotives was introduced in 1929, beginning with a fleet of five locomotives from Nasmyth, Wilson & Company and saw the addition of 11 from the North British Locomotive Company between 1939 and 1940, expanding the fleet to encompass 16 locomotives.

All Class C locomotives were 38-foot-11-inch-long 4-6-4T side tank engines with two cylinders measuring 14½" by 22". Differences may be noted with the 1929 Class C and the 1939–1941; among others, the 1929 series was lighter (73 tons compared to the later series' 74.1 tons) but featured a smaller fire grate (at 23.6 sq ft [2.19 m^{2}] compared to the later series' 28 sq ft).

An additional six orders from North British were completed in 1941, but were redirected by the War Department of the United Kingdom to Egypt for use as military locomotives in World War II. The six locomotives were allocated FMSR numbers after the war, but a dispute over payment arose as the locomotives were no longer new. Subsequently, all six locomotive were sold to the Royal Jordanian Hashemite Railway in 1949 and delisted from the FMSR by 1951.

The remaining Class Cs were presumably scrapped by Malayan Railways during the 1960s and 1970s.

=== FMSR Class D ===
Designated as FMSR numbers 22 to 25, the FMSR Class D was a series of 4-6-0 locomotives with four-wheel tenders that originated from the Selangor Railway and given the Class D designation upon its entry into the FMSR fleet in July 1901. Consisting of only four locomotives, the Class D included two locomotives from Kitson (built 1894, numbers 3530 and 3531) and two from Dübs & Company (built 1895, numbers 3220 and 3221).

FMSR 24 was scrapped in 1926, followed by the rest of the Class Ds in 1928.

=== FMSR Class E ===
Designated as FMSR numbers 30 and 31, the FMSR Class E was introduced in July 1901 as a fleet of two Kitson 4-6-0 locomotives with four-wheel tenders, both originated from the Perak Railway (built 1896 with works numbers 3681 and 3682). In comparison to the Class D, the Class E feature larger drive wheels.

The Class E was scrapped entirely between 1929 and 1930.

=== FMSR Class F ===
Designated as FMSR numbers 32 and 33, the FMSR Class F was a pair of Sharp, Stewart & Company 4-4-0 locomotives with four-wheel tenders built in 1897 for the Selangor Railway (with Sharp Stewart works numbers 4267 and 4268).

Both locomotives were scrapped in 1929 and 1930.

=== FMSR Class G ===
Designated as FMSR numbers 36 and 69, the FMSR Class G was introduced in July 1901 with a starting fleet of 21 locomotives from both the Perak Railway and the Selangor Railway, followed by two from the Malacca Railway in 1905 and an additional 11 orders directed to the FMSR between 1903 and 1905, bringing a total of 34 locomotives. The Class G was thus the largest FMSR fleet to include locomotives absorbed from state railways following the formation of the FMSR.

While the Class Gs were largely similarly built 4-6-0 locomotives with six-wheel tenders; all 34 of them were manufactured by four separate locomotive companies between 1898 and 1905. Sixteen were from Kitson, 9 were from Hunslet, three were from Robert Stephenson & Company, and two were from Neilson, Reid & Company.

The Class G was largely retired between 1928 in 1938. The last two Class Gs were withdrawn from service in July 1947.

=== FMSR Class H ===
The FMSR Class H was the first FMSR class to consist of locomotives entirely ordered after the formation of the FMSR. Delivered in the form of three batches between 1907 and 1914, three companies, Kitson, Nasmyth Wilson and Robert Stephenson, would produce a total of 54 Class H locomotives for the FMSR, while another 6 were delivered to the Johore Railway in 1908 before its absorption together with the rest of Johore Railway into the FMSR in 1912.

The Class H consisted of 4-6-2 locomotives with 8-wheel, dual bogie tenders. While nearly consistent in design, 11 1908 Class H locomotives from Kitson featured thicker frames that increased each of their weights by over 2½ tons.

The Class Hs may be distinguished by the order of the batch they were in: The first batch of 17 locomotives delivered between 1907 and 1908 were referred as "Class H1" locomotives, the second batch of 17 locomotives delivered between 1908 and 1912 were referred as "Class H2" locomotives, while the last batch of 15 locomotives received between 1913 and 1914 were referred as "Class H3" locomotives (of which two were redesignated as a "Class H4" locomotives in 1924).

The entire Class H fleet remain in service until the entire stock of Class H1s was scrapped between 1930 and 1934. The H2s and H3s were partially decommissioned before 1946, but were selected in limited numbers in 1946 for use in the Malayan Railways: Six H2s were numbered MR 501.01 to 501.06, while five H3s were numbered MR 501.07 and 501.11. The remaining 11 Class Hs remained in service at least before the 1960s and 1970s.

Builder details:

- H1 72 - 78 2C1-n2 15½"×24" 54" Kitson 4425 - 4432 / 1906
- H1 79 - 82 2C1-n2 15½"×24" 54" Nasmyth Wilson 839 - 842 / 1908
- H1 88 - 98 2C1-n2 15½"×24" 54" Kitson 4569 - 4579 / 1908
- H2 103 - 106 2C1-n2 15½"×24" 54" Kitson 4835 - 4838 / 1911
- H2 107 - 112 2C1-n2 15½"×24" 54" Kitson 4866 - 4871 / 1912
- H2 115 - 117 2C1-n2 15½"×24" 54" Kitson 4875 - 4877 / 1912
- H2 118 - 121 2C1-n2 15½"×24" 54" Stephenson 3502 - 3505 / 1913
- H2 131 - 134 2C1-n2 15½"×24" 54" Nasmyth Wilson 833 - 836 / 1908
- H2 135 - 140 2C1-n2 15½"×24" 54" Kitson 4955 - 4959 / 1913
- H2 141 - 144 2C1-n2 15½"×24" 54" Kitson 4960 - 4963 / 1913
- H3 162 - 166 2C1-n2 15½"×24" 54" Kitson 5015 - 5019 / 1914

=== FMSR Class I ===
The FMSR Class I was built for the FMSR by three locomotive companies between 1907 and 1916 and delivered in five batches between 1908 and 1916. Upon the delivery of the last batch, the Class I included a total of 31 locomotives. The Class I was a 0-6-4T tank locomotives with tanks of varying sizes: The first batch featured 800 gallon tanks, while the third batch featured 1200 gallon tanks.

The first batch, delivered 1908, encompassed five locomotives from Kitson (works numbers 4527 to 4531) built between December 1907 and January 1908, followed by an additional three from North British in 1912 (works numbers 19909 to 19911), eight and ten from Kitson in 1913 (works numbers 4946 to 4953) and 1914 (works numbers 5021 to 5030), and five from Hawthorn Leslie in 1916 (works numbers 3146 to 3150).

Between 1927 and 1945, 13 Class I were decommissioned. While 18 Class Is remained in service in 1946 to receive a new locomotive number, virtually all of the class were withdrawn from the FMSR's and MR's rolling stocks by 1953. Two Class Is were sold to the Malayan Collieries in 1951 and 1953.

Builder details:

- I1 182 - 185 2C1-h2 15½"×24" 54" Kitson 5159 - 5162 / 1918
- I1 186 - 201 2C1-h2 15½"×24" 54" North British Locomotive Company 22505 - 22520 / 1919

=== FMSR Class J ===
The FMSR Class J was a fleet of three 1891 Dübs (2462 to 2464) locomotives that served the Sungei Ujong Railway and was absorbed into the FMSR in 1908. Originally 0-6-2T tank locomotives, the trains were previously rebuilt as 4-4-2T locomotives in 1902. The trains were assigned FMSR numbers 99 to 101.

Having served for 20 years, the J Class was gradually withdrawn between the late 1910s and early 1920s. FMSR 99 was sold to the Malayan Collieries in April 1922, while FMSR 100 was retired in May 1919 and followed by the FMSR 101 in November 1924.

=== FMSR Class K ===
==== Old K (1908–1926) ====
Like the J Class, the FMSR Class K originated as part of Sungei Ujong Railway's rolling stock, before the railway company was absorbed into FMSR in 1908. The K Class consisted of only a single 1899 Dübs (works number 3621) 4-4-2T locomotive, and was significantly larger than the J Class.

The Class K was withdrawn in August 1926.

==== New K (1928–1970s) ====
As the K Class designation was vacant following the retirement of the sole K Class locomotive in 1926, a new series of locomotives was introduced in the following year to take its place. Bearing FMSR numbers 151 to 161, the "new" FMSR Class K was introduced in 1928 for use for the then newly opened East Coast Line that served the East Coast of British Malaya, with eleven in total built. The Class K was delivered in two batches; the first in the form of seven locomotives built by Beyer-Peacock in 1927 (works numbers 6373 to 6379) and delivered 1928, followed by another four by Robert Stephenson in 1929 (works numbers 4013 to 4016) and delivered 1930. The locomotives were distinguished as K1 for those from the first batch and K2 for those from the second batch.

Based on the earlier Class L, the Class K was a 4-6-2 tender locomotive with an 8-wheel bogie tender. The first batch of Class Ks were essentially improved version of the L Class; further improvement were made on the second batch. With an overall length of 56' 4" and cylinders measuring at 17" by 24", the Class K weighs in a total of 91.3 tons (55.5 tons from the locomotive and 35.8 tons from the tender).

While records exists of three Class K1s and three Class K2s shipped to Burma during Japanese occupation in World War II for use in the Thailand-Burma Railway, the entire K Class fleet was accounted for when it was renumbered in 1946. The K1 Class was entirely withdrawn between 1958 and 1959, while the K2 Class remain in use well into the 1970s, when all steam locomotives were withdrawn.

Builder details:

- K1 153" - 159" 2C1-h2 17"×24" 54 Beyer, Peacock & Company 6373 - 6379 / 1927 -> 541.01-07
- K2 151" - 152" 2C1-h2 17"×24" 54 Stephenson 4013 - 4014 / 1927 -> 542.01-02
- K2 160" - 161" 2C1-h2 17"×24" 54 Stephenson 4015 - 4016 / 1927 -> 542.03-04

=== FMSR Class L ===
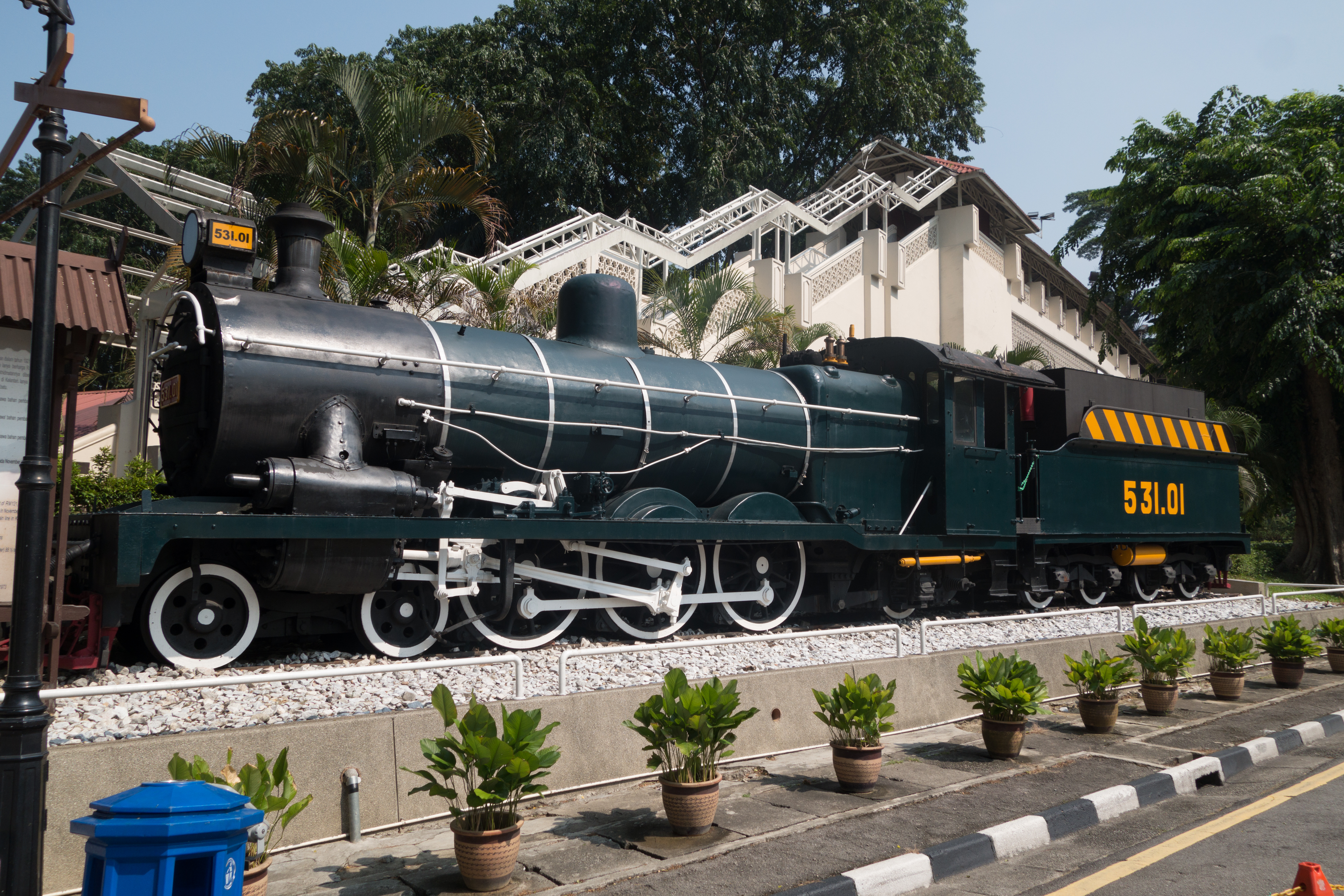
Ex-FMSR Class L No. 214 (KTM No. 531.01) at the National Museum.

Designated as FMSR numbers 214 to 233, the FMSR Class L was introduced 1921 with the arrival of 20 Kitson locomotives (works numbers 5300 to 5319), which were completed and tested between January and April 1921.

Ordered to eliminate double-heading of express services, the Class L was an improved and more powerful variant of the Class P, intended to haul longer coaches with lesser need for additional motive power. Like the Class P, the Class L was a 4-6-2 tender locomotive pulling an eight-wheel bogie tender. The Class L is 56' 4" long, weighs 88.4 tons and features cylinders measuring 17" by 24".

During Japanese occupation of Malaya in World War II, five Class Ls (FMSR 216, 220, 222, 224 and 229) were taken to the Thailand-Burma Railway. Following surrender by the Japanese in 1945, all five of the Class L were returned, with all Class Ls renumbered in 1946. The fleet continued to serve the FMSR and MR into the 1970s, by which the entire class would be withdrawn by MR. The first Class L built and the remaining Class L in the MR fleet, FMSR 214/MR 531.01, was donated to the National Museum in Kuala Lumpur in 1971, where it is now a permanent outdoor exhibit.

Builder details:

- L1 214 - 233 2C1-h2 15½"×24" 54" Kitson 5300 - 5319 / 1921 -> 531.01-20

=== FMSR Class O ===
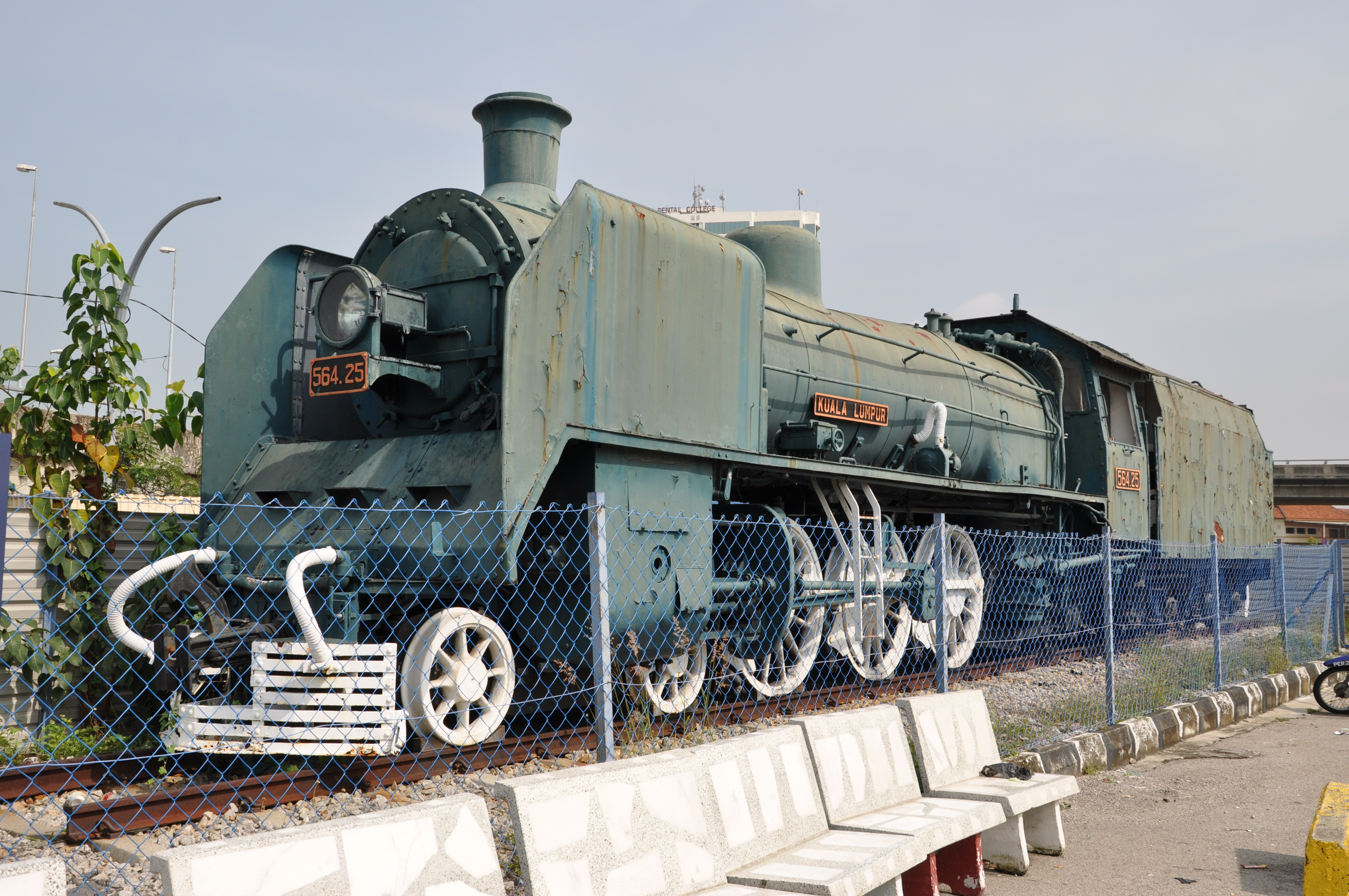
Ex-FMSR Class O No. 74 "Dungun" (KTM No. 562.04) (later renumbered after the scrapped 564.25 "Kuala Lumpur") at Butterworth station in 2013.

Four examples have been preserved: 562.04 "Dungun" (later renumbered after the scrapped 564.25 "Kuala Lumpur" and formerly preserved in Butterworth), 564.12 "Alor Gajah" (preserved in Port Dickson), 564.34 "Pekan" (preserved in Pekan), 564.36 "Temerloh" (formerly preserved in Gemas, and due to be moved to Johor Bahru). 564.36 "Temerloh" was the last operational steam locomotive in Peninsular Malaysia, inactive since 1997.

- O1 60" - 70" 2C1-h3 (3)12½"×24" 54" North British Locomotive Company 24419 - 24429 / 1938 -> 561.01-11
- O2 71" - 76" 2C1-h3 (3)12½"×24" 54" North British Locomotive Company 25508 - 24513 / 1939 -> 562.01-06
- O3 77" - 80" 2C1-h3 (3)13"×24" 54" North British Locomotive Company 24570 - 24573 / 1939 -> 563.01-03
- O3 81" - 87" 2C1-h3 (3)13"×24" 54" North British Locomotive Company 24574 - 24580 / 1940 -> 563.04-11
- O4 564.01 - 564.40 (3)13"×24" 54" North British Locomotive Company 25756 - 27595 / 1946

=== FMSR Class Q ===
Builder details:

- Q1 202 - 207 2C1-h2 15½"×24" 54" Baldwin 51914 - 51957 / 1920
- Q1 208 - 209 2C1-h2 15½"×24" 54" Baldwin 51991 - 51992 / 1920
- Q1 210 - 213 2C1-h2 15½"×24" 54" Baldwin 52018 - 52021 / 1920

=== FMSR Class S ===
- S1 237 - 239 2C1-h3 (3)17"×24" 54" North British Locomotive Company 23679 - 23681 / 1928 -> 551.01-03
- S2 240 - 247 2C1-h3 (3)17"×24" 54" North British Locomotive Company 23904 - 23911 / 1929 -> 552.01-08
- S3 248 - 252 2C1-h3 (3)17"×24" 54" Beyer, Peacock & Company 6721 - 6725 / 1931 -> 553.01-05

=== FMSR Class WD ===
The FMSR bought 28 United States Army Transportation Corps class S118 2-8-2 "MacArthur" locomotives after World War II. Later it sold some of them to East African Railways, where they became EAR class 27.

=== Other classes ===
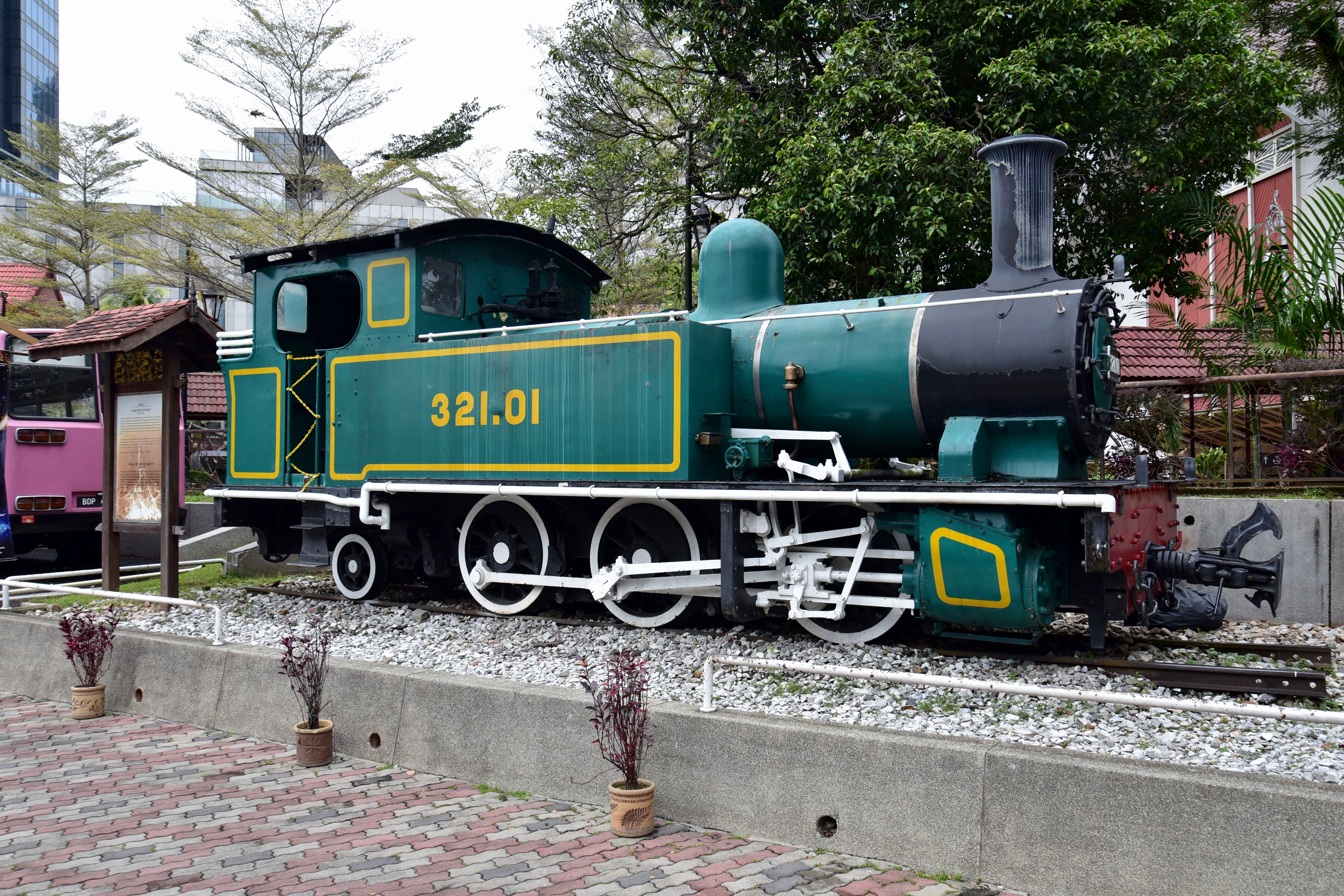
Ex-FMSR Class T No. 321.01 at the National Museum.

A number of early locomotives which survived into FMSR ownership along with several more FMSR classes (M, N, P, R, T & 90) are missing from the above.

== See also ==
- Rail transport in Malaysia
- Keretapi Tanah Melayu (Malayan Railways)
- Prasarana Malaysia
- Mass Rapid Transit Corporation (Malaysia)
- Express Rail Link Sdn Bhd
