= World Trade Centre Kuala Lumpur =

Convention and exhibition centre in Kuala Lumpur

Coordinates: 3°10′4.96″N 101°41′29.78″E

- Pusat Dagangan Dunia Kuala Lumpur
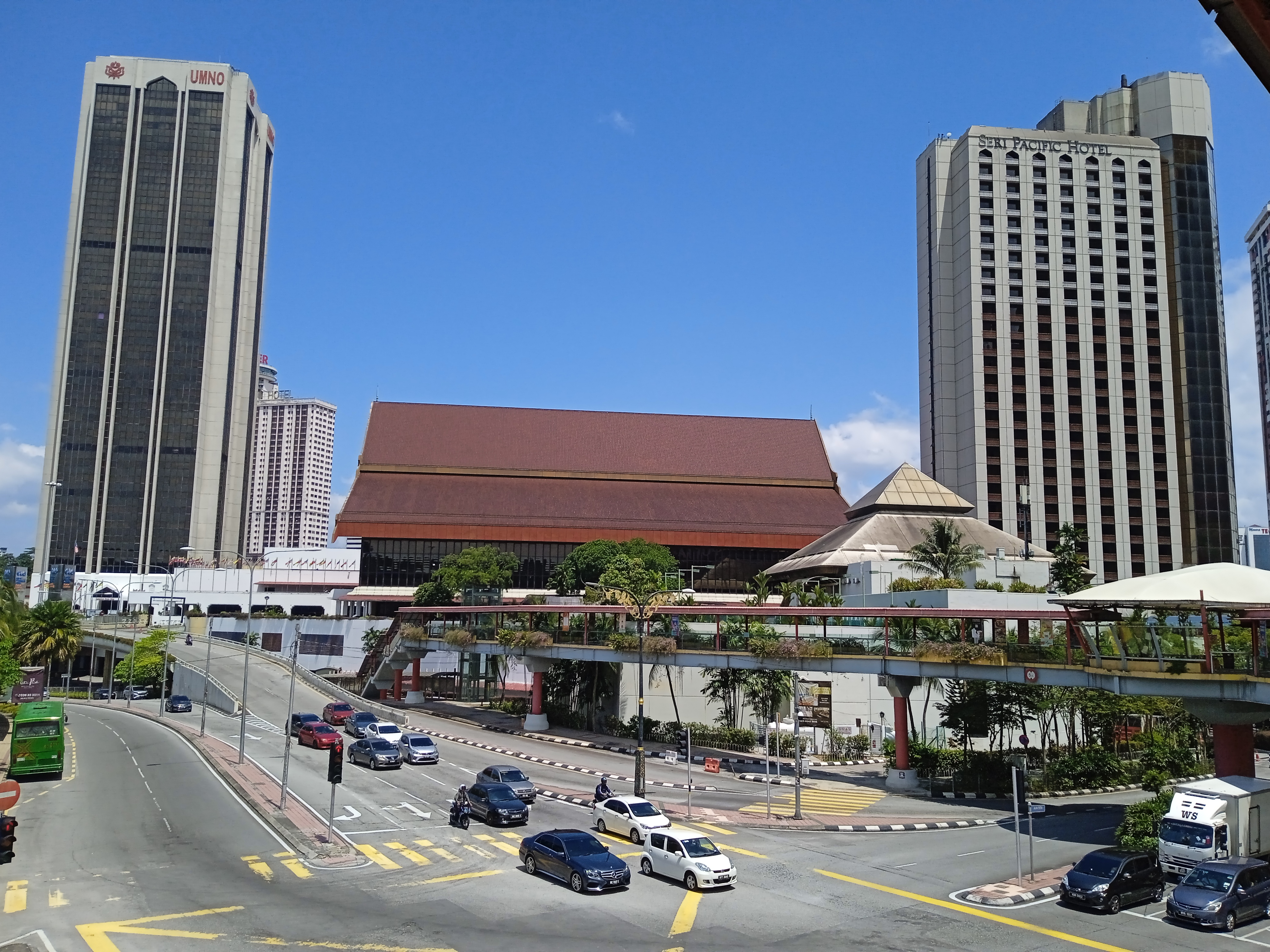
- Interactive map of the World Trade Centre Kuala Lumpur area
- Alternative names: WTC KL, World Trade Centre KL, Putra World Trade Centre

General information
- Status: Completed
- Type: Offices and convention centre
- Location: Jalan Tun Ismail, Chow Kit, Kuala Lumpur, Malaysia
- Construction started: 1981; 45 years ago
- Completed: 1984; 42 years ago
- Opening: 26 September 1985; 40 years ago
- Owner
- Operator: Putrade Property Management Sdn Bhd

Technical details
- Floor area: 1.70 million ft^{2}

Design and construction
- Architect: Datuk Dr. Ikmal Hisham Albakri

Website
- worldtradecentrekl.com.my

World Trade Centre Kuala Lumpur, formerly known as Putra World Trade Centre (PWTC; Malay: Pusat Dagangan Dunia Putra), is a convention and exhibition centre in Kuala Lumpur, Malaysia. The venue is sprawled over 1.7 million square feet with 235,000 square feet of exhibition space.

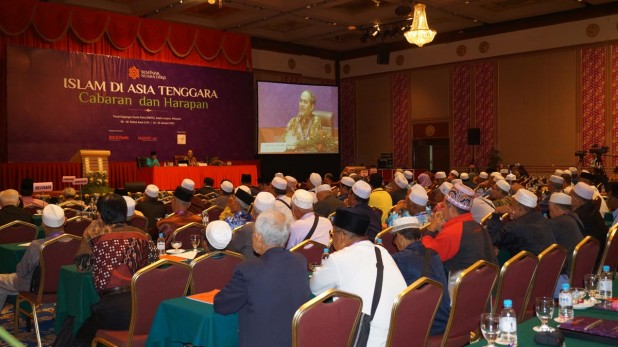
A seminar held at one of the halls at PWTC (WTC KL)

It is Malaysia's historical convention centre and the preferred venue for local and international conventions, concerts, weddings, and small events like seminars, trainings and meetings.

Construction commenced in 1981 and was completed in 1984. The building was officially opened on 26 September 1985. Before the PWTC, the area was the venue of the first and subsequent annual UMNO General Assemblies.

This building is also used for the International Quran Recitation Competition every year, since it was moved from Stadium Merdeka in 1985.

== Location and access ==
WTC KL is located in the Jalan Putra ward in the north-western corner of downtown Kuala Lumpur. It is next to Jalan Putra's interchange with Jalan Tun Ismail and is within walking distance of several hotels such as the Seri Pacific Hotel Kuala Lumpur, Sunway Putra Hotel, Dynasty Hotel Kuala Lumpur, and Sheraton Imperial Hotel Kuala Lumpur. The confluence of the Batu and Gombak Rivers is located right behind the convention centre.

The Sunway Putra Mall is connected to WTC KL by a pedestrian bridge, which also links up the LRT and KTM Komuter stations and the aforementioned hotels.

=== Public transportation ===
WTC KL previously lend its name to the PWTC LRT Station on the Ampang Line and the Sri Petaling Line. It is also connected by a pedestrian bridge across Jalan Kuching to the Putra Komuter station which serves both the Seremban Line and Port Klang Line on the KTM Komuter network.

=== Car ===
WTC KL is located adjacent to the interchanges with Jalan Kuching and Jalan Ipoh, both part of the Federal Route 1 system.

== Interior ==
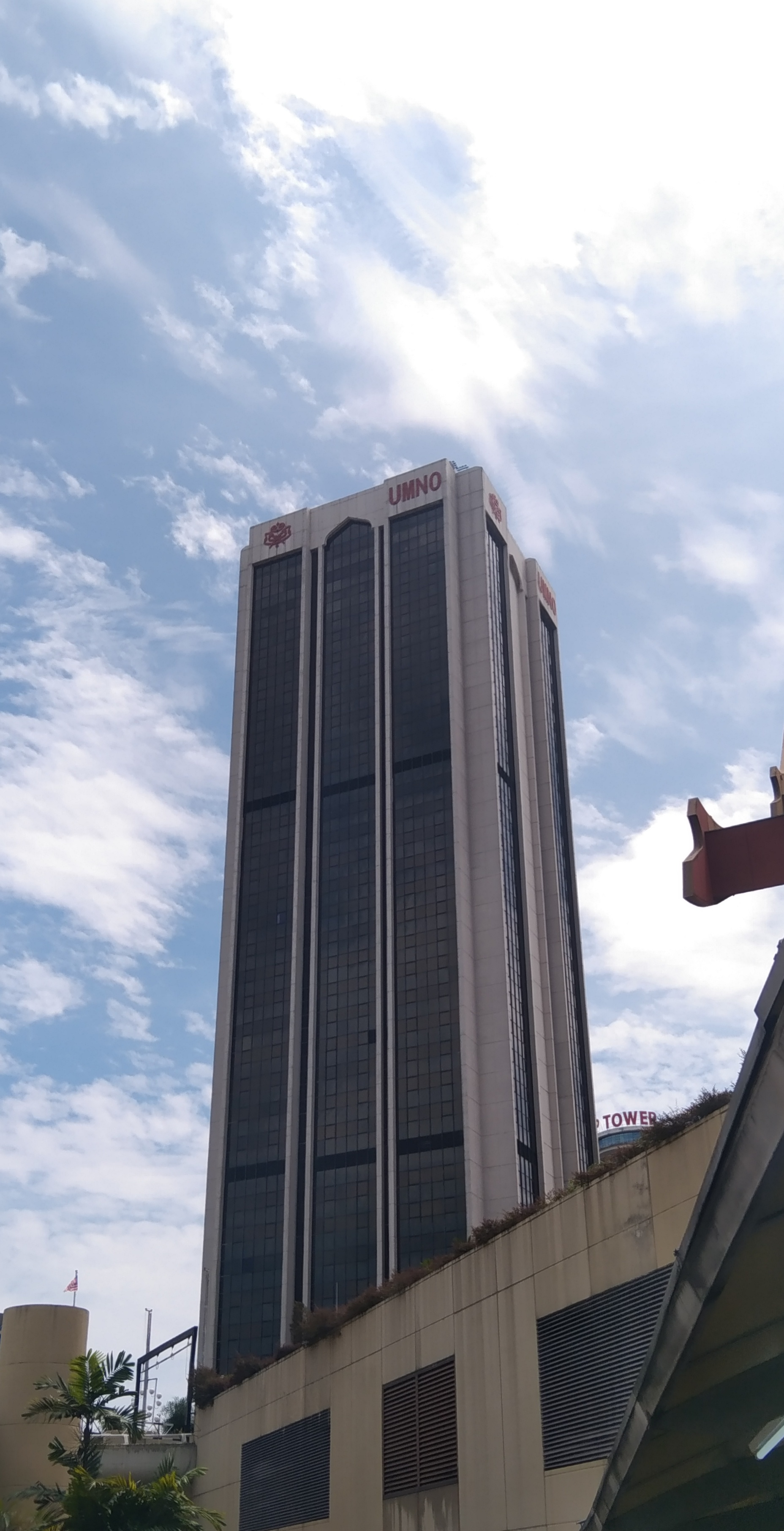
Menara Dato' Onn

- Menara Dato Onn - The UMNO general headquarters
- Dewan Merdeka
- Dewan Tun Dr Ismail
- Dewan Tun Hussein Onn
- Dewan Tun Razak 1 & 2 (Separated from the main building across Batu river)
- Dewan Tun Razak 3
- Dewan Tun Razak 4
- Johor/Kedah Room
- Kuala Lumpur Room
- Kenanga Room
- Pahang Room
- Perak Room
- Perlis Room
- Perdana Lounge
- Tanjung Lounge
- Anggerik Lounge
- Melur Lounge
- Serambi Lounge
- Cempaka Suites
- Merdeka Suites
- Perdana Suites
- Seroja Suites

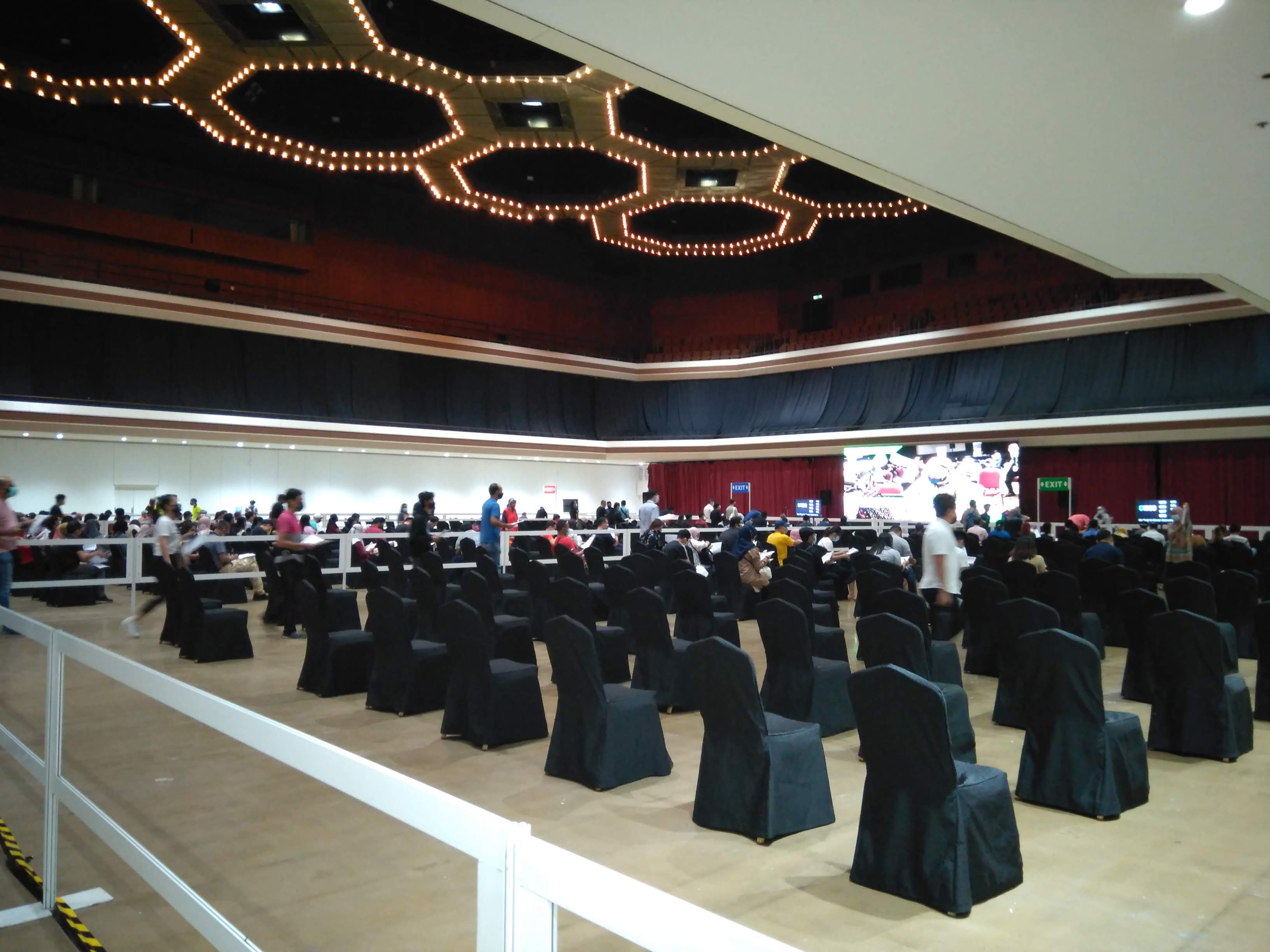
PWTC (WTC KL) as a vaccination centre (PPV) under the National COVID-19 Immunisation Programme.

== Notable events ==
- PATA General Conference in 1986.
- Commonwealth Heads of Government Meeting 1989.
- ABU Golden Kite World Song Festival, 1989-1991
- Toto, Kingdom of Desire Tour – 25 November 1992
- B.B. King, 2 December 1992
- Bryan Adams, 3 January 1994
- Bob Dylan, – Never Ending Tour – 22 February 1992
- Foreigner (band), 25 February 1993
- INXS, 20 February 1994
- Duran Duran, – 1993-1994 The Dilate Your Mind Tour – 8 April 1994
- James Taylor, 17 March 1995
- Bread, 19 September 1997
- Westlife, – Where Dreams Come True Tour – 26 May 2001
- NAM General Conference in 2003.
- Bruno Mars, 10 April 2011.
- MATTA Fair
- PUBG Mobile Club Open - Fall Split Prelims that was held on 23–25 November 2019
- PUBG Mobile Club Open - Fall Split Global Finals that was held on 29 November-1 December 2019
- COVID-19 mega vaccination centre (PPV) for Kuala Lumpur region
- Tom Jones (singer) - Ages & Stages Tour, 6 March 2024
- Kuala Lumpur International Book Fair
- Anime Fest Plus + (September)

== See also ==
- Kuala Lumpur Convention Centre
