= Sunway Putra Mall =

Coordinates: 3°9′59.92″N 101°41′31.71″E

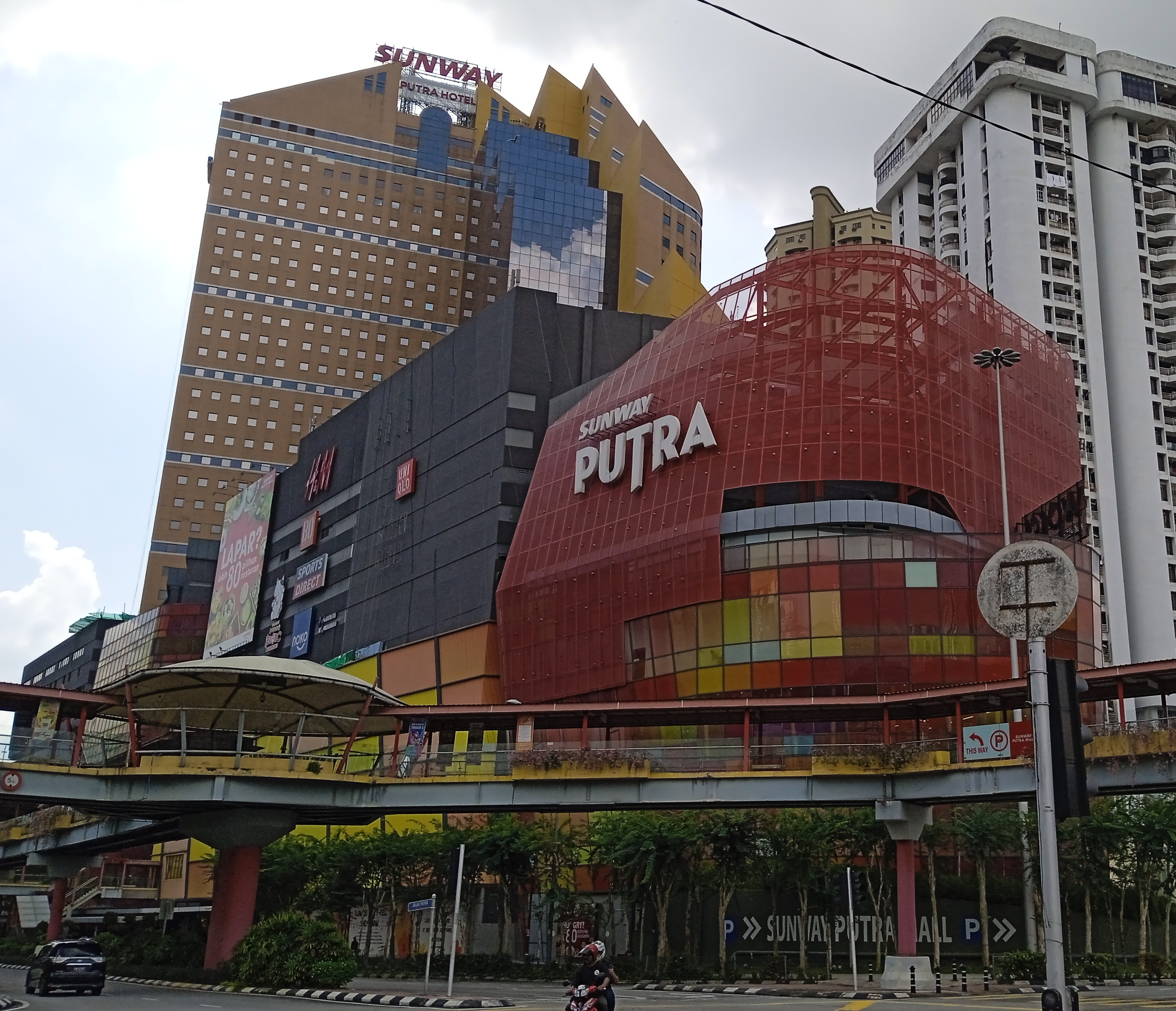
- Location: Chow Kit, Kuala Lumpur, Malaysia
- Opened: 12 June 1987 as The Mall; 28 May 2015 as Sunway Putra Mall
- Previous names: The Mall; Kompleks Putra Place
- Developer: Metroplex Holdings (1987–2011); Sunway Group (2011–present)
- Owner: Metroplex Holdings (1987–2011); Sunway Group (2011–present)
- Num. of stores: 300+
- Floor area: More than 560,000 sq ft
- Floors: 8
- Public transit: AG4 SP4 PWTC LRT station KA04 Putra Komuter station
- Website: www.sunwayputramall.com

Sunway Putra Mall, previously known as The Mall or Putra Place, is a shopping mall located along Jalan Putra in Kuala Lumpur, Malaysia. It is situated across the street from the Putra World Trade Centre (now WTC KL) and the Seri Pacific Hotel.

== History ==
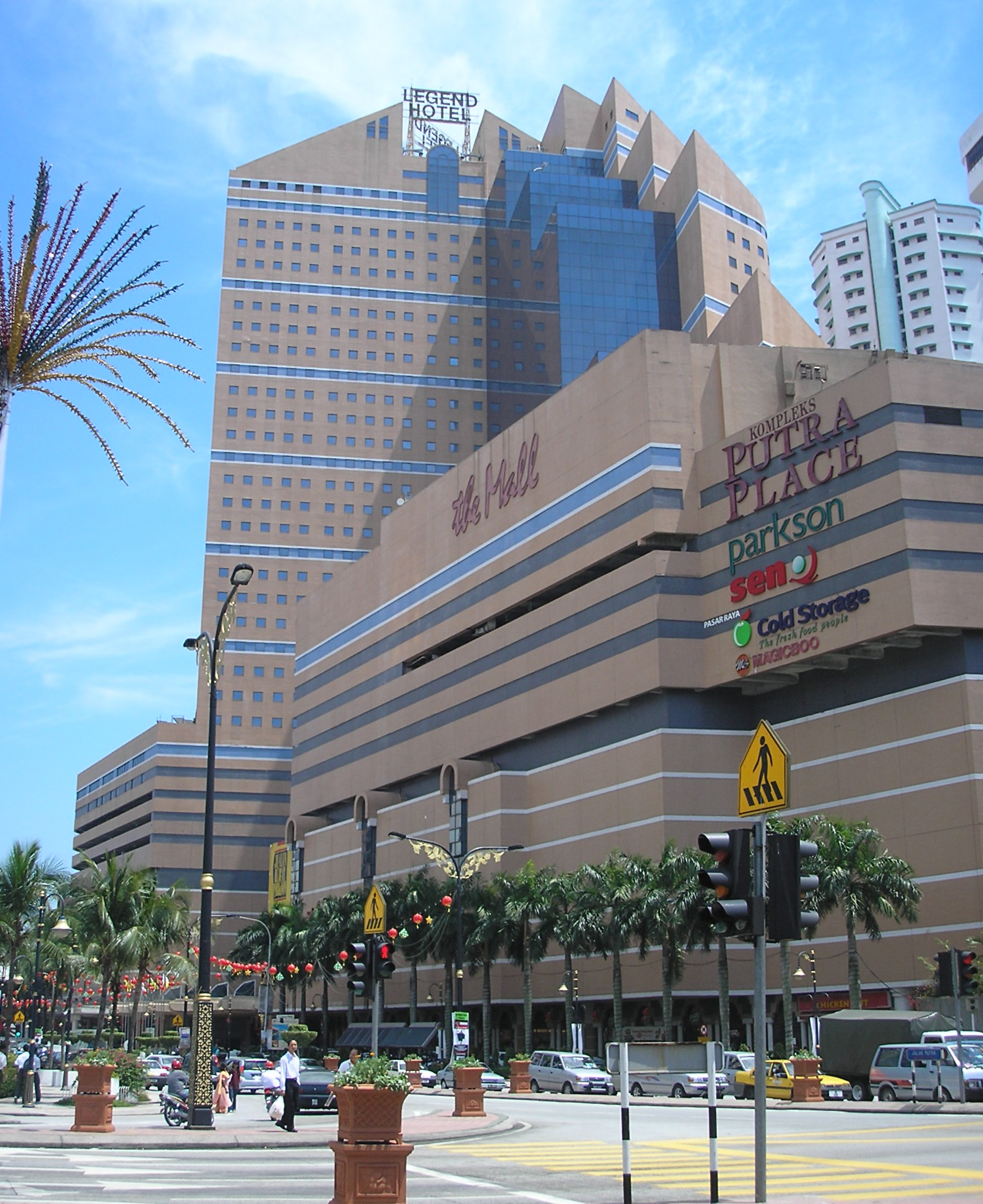
The exterior of The Mall and Legend Hotel in 2007

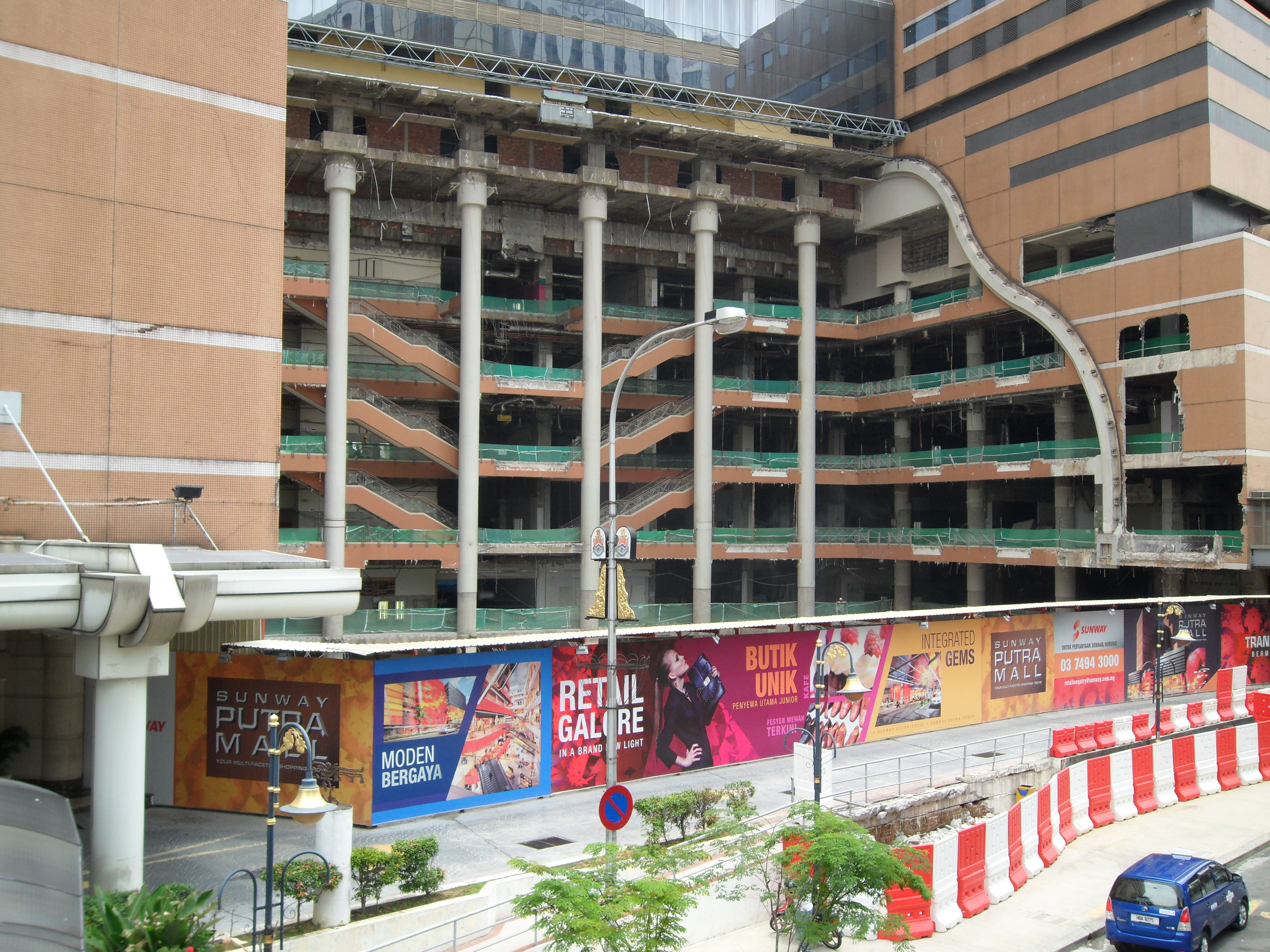
The Mall, under renovation in September 2013

The complex, known as "The Mall" at that time, was built by Metroplex Holdings Sdn. Bhd. (MHSB) and opened on 12 June 1987 by Mahathir Mohamad, the fourth prime minister, who personally buried a time capsule that will be unearthed after a century, in 2087. The capsule contains a message written by Mahathir and is addressed to the citizens of the future.

At the time, The Mall was the largest shopping centre in Malaysia and was built to attract more shoppers from Singapore to Kuala Lumpur. It was built at the cost of RM289 million and launched with a light show. The Mall also housed a 18,600 square-metre Yaohan outlet which opened the same year.

In 1996, Yaohan Holdings Malaysia planned to acquire The Mall if it becomes profitable, as the group's policy was to own its ventured assets and properties in Malaysia.

In March 2011, Putra Place, which consists of The Mall, Legend Hotel (now known as Sunway Putra Hotel) and an office block, was acquired by Sunway REIT under Sunway Group for RM513.94 million in a public auction and they spent RM307 million in refurbishment costs. The refurbishment started in May 2013. It reopened as "Sunway Putra Mall" on 28 May 2015. Sunway Putra Mall repositioned itself as an urban-chic lifestyle mall and houses 300 outlets.

== Facilities ==
In November 2023, Sunway Putra Mall installed Tesla Destination Chargers in its underground car park on Level B2 (Zone C11), providing up to six Tesla-specific AC charging points. These chargers were initially available free of charge for Tesla vehicles.

== Public transit ==
Sunway Putra Pedestrian Walkway

A pedestrian bridge that connects PWTC LRT station, Putra Komuter station, Putra World Trade Centre, Seri Pacific Hotel, Putra Bus Terminal and Sunway Putra Mall is available to allow commuters and pedestrians to move with ease.

The mall also has sufficient parking lots to cater for the shoppers and office workers around this area (Sunway Putra Mall parking rate)
