= Bandar Tasik Selatan station =

Train major interchange station in Kuala Lumpur, Malaysia

KB04 SP15 KT2 Bandar Tasik Selatan
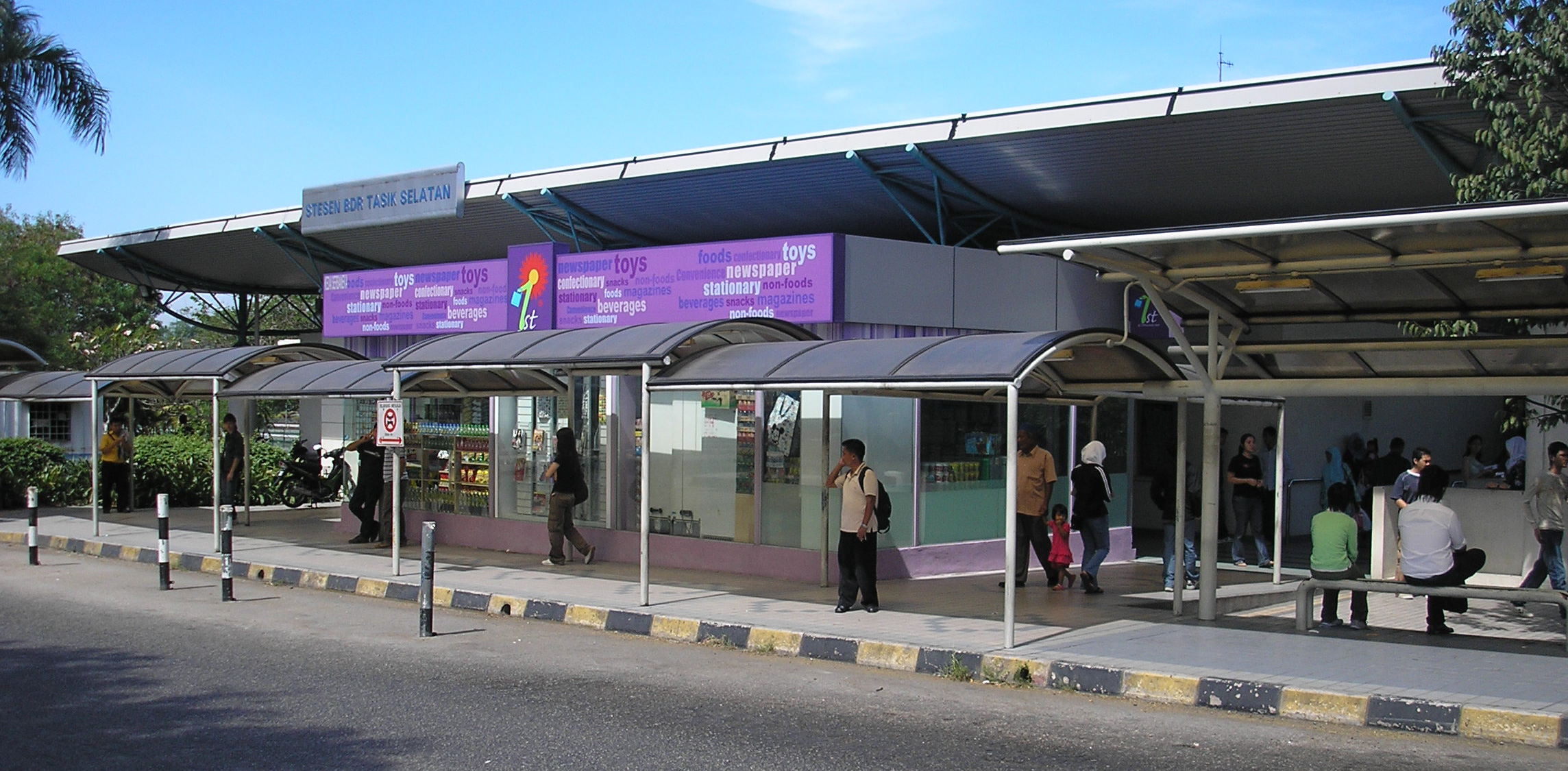
- The southeastern entrance into the station

General information
- Other names: Malay: باندر تاسيق سلاتن (Jawi); Chinese: 南湖镇; Tamil: பண்டார் தாசேக் செலாத்தான்
- Location: Kuala Lumpur Middle Ring Road 2, Bandar Tasik Selatan; 57100 Kuala Lumpur; Malaysia
- Coordinates: 3°4′34″N 101°42′38″E
- System: Rapid KL (LRT)
- Owner: Railway Assets Corporation (KTM); Prasarana Malaysia (LRT); Express Rail Link (ERL)
- Operator: Keretapi Tanah Melayu; Rapid Rail; Express Rail Link
- Lines: West Coast Line; 4 Sri Petaling Line; 7 KLIA Transit
- Platforms: 2 side platforms (KTM); 1 island platform (LRT); 2 island platforms (ERL)
- Tracks: 2 (KTM); 2 (LRT); 4 (ERL)
- Connections: Terminal Bersepadu Selatan bus hub

Construction
- Structure type: Surface
- Parking: Available with payment
- Cycle facilities: Not available
- Accessible: Yes

Other information
- Station code: KB04 SP15 KT2

History
- Opened: 10 November 1995; 30 years ago (KTM); 11 July 1998; 28 years ago (LRT); 20 June 2002; 24 years ago (ERL)
- Former names: Batu Tujoh (KTM); Tasik Selatan (LRT)

Services
Preceding station	KTM Komuter	Following station
Salak Selatan towards Batu Caves	Batu Caves–Pulau Sebang Line	Serdang towards Pulau Sebang/Tampin
Preceding station	ETS	Following station
Kuala Lumpur Sentral towards KL Sentral	KL Sentral–JB Sentral (Platinum)	Kajang towards JB Sentral
Kuala Lumpur Sentral towards Padang Besar	Padang Besar–JB Sentral (Platinum)	Seremban towards JB Sentral
Kuala Lumpur Sentral towards Butterworth	Butterworth–JB Sentral (Platinum)	Seremban towards JB Sentral
Kuala Lumpur Sentral towards Padang Besar	Padang Besar–JB Sentral (Gold)	Kajang towards JB Sentral
Kuala Lumpur Sentral towards Butterworth	Butterworth–Segamat (Gold)	Kajang towards Segamat
Preceding station		Following station
Bandar Tun Razak towards Sentul Timur	Sri Petaling Line	Sungai Besi towards Putra Heights
Preceding station	Express Rail Link	Following station
Kuala Lumpur Sentral Terminus	KLIA Transit	Putrajaya & Cyberjaya towards KLIA T2
KLIA Ekspres does not stop here
Location

The Bandar Tasik Selatan station (BTS) is a major Malaysian interchange station located next to and named after the town of Bandar Tasik Selatan, in Kuala Lumpur. The station serves as both a stop and an interchange for KTM Komuter's Batu Caves–Pulau Sebang Line, KTM ETS, Rapid KL's Sri Petaling Line, and the Express Rail Link's KLIA Transit trains. BTS station is also integrated with the Terminal Bersepadu Selatan (TBS) bus hub. BTS and TBS were developed as an intermodal transportation hub.

Facilities for the reloading of Touch 'n Go cards are also provided in the interchange, at the LRT Sri Petaling Line's concourse.

== Location ==
BTS station is located approximately 10 km (6.2 mi) south of the Kuala Lumpur city centre, towards the Kuala Lumpur International Airport (KLIA). The location of BTS and TBS provides easy access to Malaysia's motorway network, avoiding city centre road congestion.

== Lines ==
All three lines in the interchange accommodate for disabled passengers.

=== KTM Komuter and KTM ETS ===
The station was formed with the completion of a KTM Komuter commuter rail halt, as part of the second phase of the electrified and double-tracked route of the KTM West Coast Line between Rawang and Seremban stations, which opened on 10 November 1995. The station was the first in the line to be accessible from the Kuala Lumpur Middle Ring Road 2 (MRR2), but its facilities were rudimentary, consisting of only two raised side platforms lined along a curved double track, a footbridge, and an elevated ticket area that initially provided only ticket vending machines. The platform shelters were only sufficient for a limited space, and the halt often suffered from bottlenecking at the ticket area. The various levels of the halt were also initially linked primarily via staircases, rendering the halt unfriendly to disabled users.

In 2006 and 2007, renovation works were made to expand the ticket area of the halt to add a larger concourse area with a manual ticket counter. In addition, existing shelters along the platforms were replaced by large canopies during the middle of 2007, in conjunction with the 2006 and 2007 canopy upgrades at most Komuter stations opened circa 1995.

On 4 August 2016, an additional morning train (Mondays to Fridays except on public holidays) was introduced between Bandar Tasik Selatan, KL Sentral and Tanjung Malim. The train starts at Bandar Tasik Selatan at 5:35am, running a non-stop express service to KL Sentral, arriving at 5:49am. The train then leaves KL Sentral at 6:15am and runs as a normal Port Klang Line train to Tanjung Malim, stopping at every station before terminating at Tanjung Malim at 7:44am. This has since been replaced with modifications to the KTM Komuter timetable.

The station is current served by KTM Komuter's Batu Caves–Pulau Sebang Line and KTM ETS services.

=== LRT Sri Petaling Line ===
The second addition to the stop is a subsurface light rapid transit (LRT) station for the LRT Sri Petaling Line, then known as the STAR LRT. The station was opened on 11 July 1998, as part of the second phase of the STAR LRT system's opening, which included 7 new stations along the Chan Sow Lin-Sri Petaling route, and was situated directly southeast from the KTM halt and closer to the MRR2. At that time, the LRT station was named "Tasik Selatan" station. Because of the layout, the KTM halt was initially accessible solely via the main entrance of the LRT station, which also currently serves as the southeastern access point into the interchange complex.

In comparison to the KTM halt during its time of opening, the STAR LRT station was considerably more capable of handling larger numbers of passengers, with several ticket counters and ticket vending machines prepared in its ticket concourse when the station was unveiled to commuters. The station also features an island platform for its two adjoining tracks, instead of side platforms. Both segments of the station are linked by a footbridge, which, like the initial KTM halt, did not accommodate disabled passengers as the footbridge is only accessible via staircases. This has since changed when lifts were added to both the KTM and LRT stations.

The principal styling of the station is similar to most other stations along the LRT system, featuring multi-tiered roofs supported by latticed frames, and white plastered walls and pillars. Signboards in the station formerly referred to itself simply as "Tasek Selatan".

=== Express Rail Link ===
The Bandar Tasik Selatan ERL station, with the Maju Link building in the background.

The Express Rail Link (ERL) station is the latest line to be added to the interchange station complex, beginning its operation on 20 June 2002 as part of the 5-station KLIA Transit airport rail link between the Kuala Lumpur International Airport station (now known as KLIA Terminal 1 station) and KL Sentral.

Rather than sharing a common access point with the KTM station and the LRT station, the ERL station was constructed as an entirely dedicated structure towards the northwest of the KTM station, with its own access point via the road between Kampung Malaysia Tambahan and Jalan Sungai Besi (a branch road from the Sungai Besi Expressway). The only direct linkage between the ERL station and the other two stations is a 95-metre (312 ft) footbridge over the ERL and KTM tracks into the ticket area of the KTM station, thus serving as a second access point to both the KTM and LRT stations.

The station was built with a unique design that incorporated large semicircular roofs as shelters for platforms with multi-tiered roofs for the rest of the building, similar to the adjoining LRT station. Unlike the initial structures of the KTM and LRT stations, however, the station was planned and built to support disabled passengers, with elevators and inclinations up and down uneven walkways, alongside stairways and escalators in all relevant areas of the station. The station also features two island platforms along four tracks, and basic ticket counters.

== Terminal Bersepadu Selatan ==
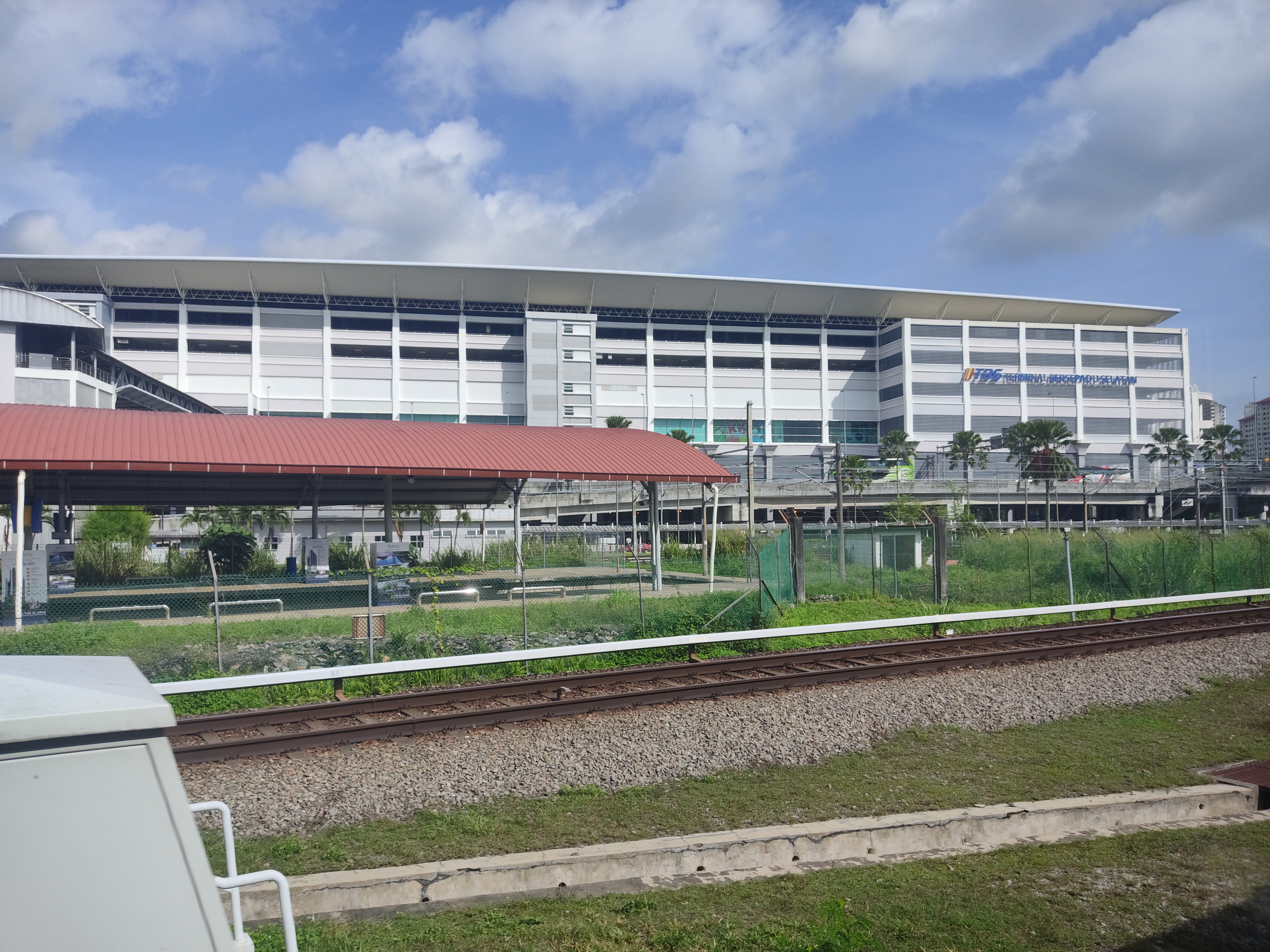
TBS station view from BTS LRT station

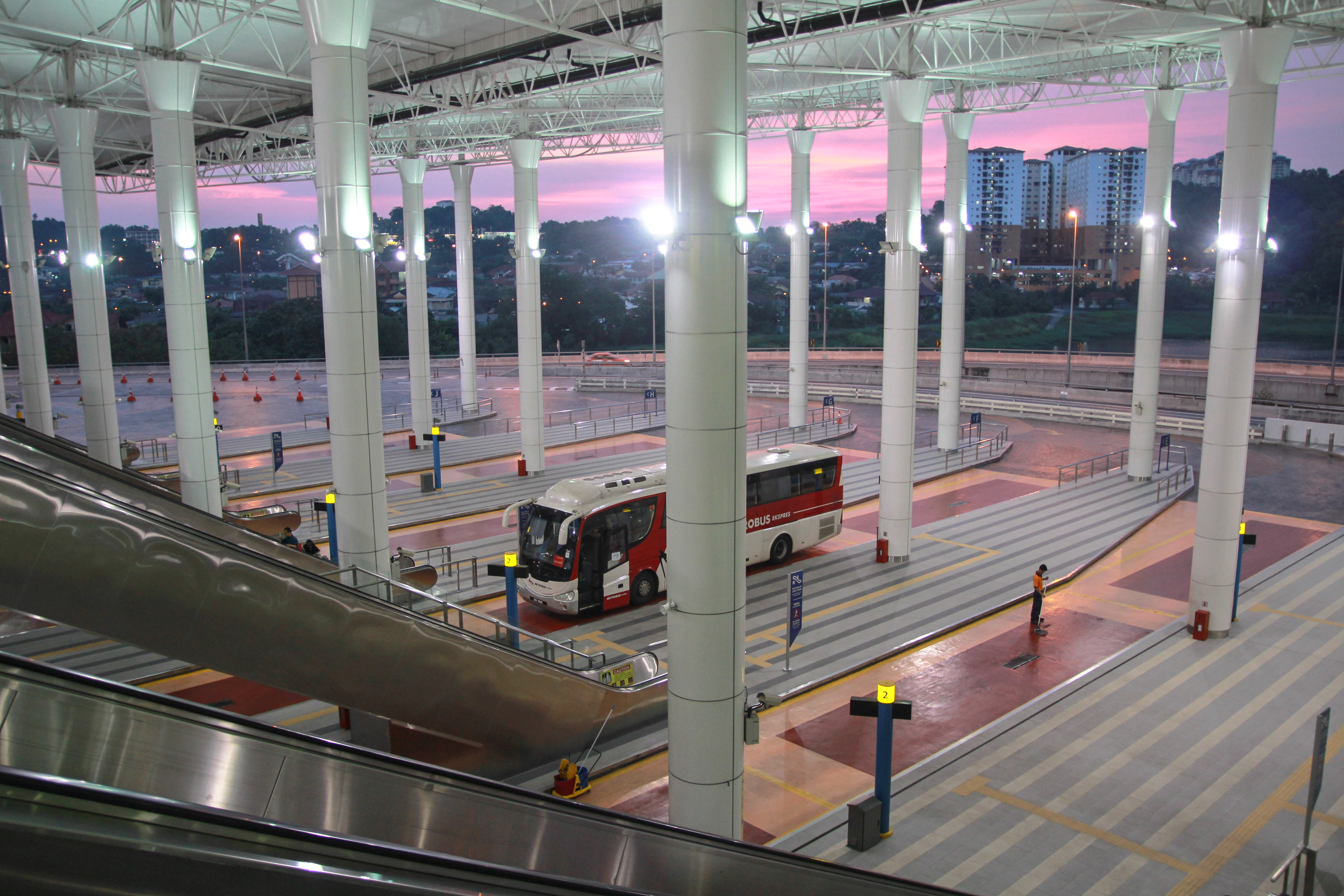
Terminal Bersepadu Selatan at dusk

Terminal Bersepadu Selatan (TBS, English: Southern Integrated Terminal) is the main long-distance bus terminal in Kuala Lumpur, Malaysia. It is integrated with the adjacent Bandar Tasik Selatan station (BTS) via a footbridge, forming the TBS-BTS integrated transportation hub.

TBS is one of the three planned Integrated Transport Terminals (ITT) of Kuala Lumpur, and the first to be put into operation, until the opening of second ITT, located in Gombak, on 15 March 2025. Originally intended to be the bus terminal serving southbound buses, TBS gradually took over bus operations for East Coast-bound and northbound buses from older city bus terminals; the East Coast-bound buses were eventually transferred to Gombak. The third ITT, located at Sungai Buloh, is in planning stages and will eventually become the main bus terminals for northbound buses.

=== History ===
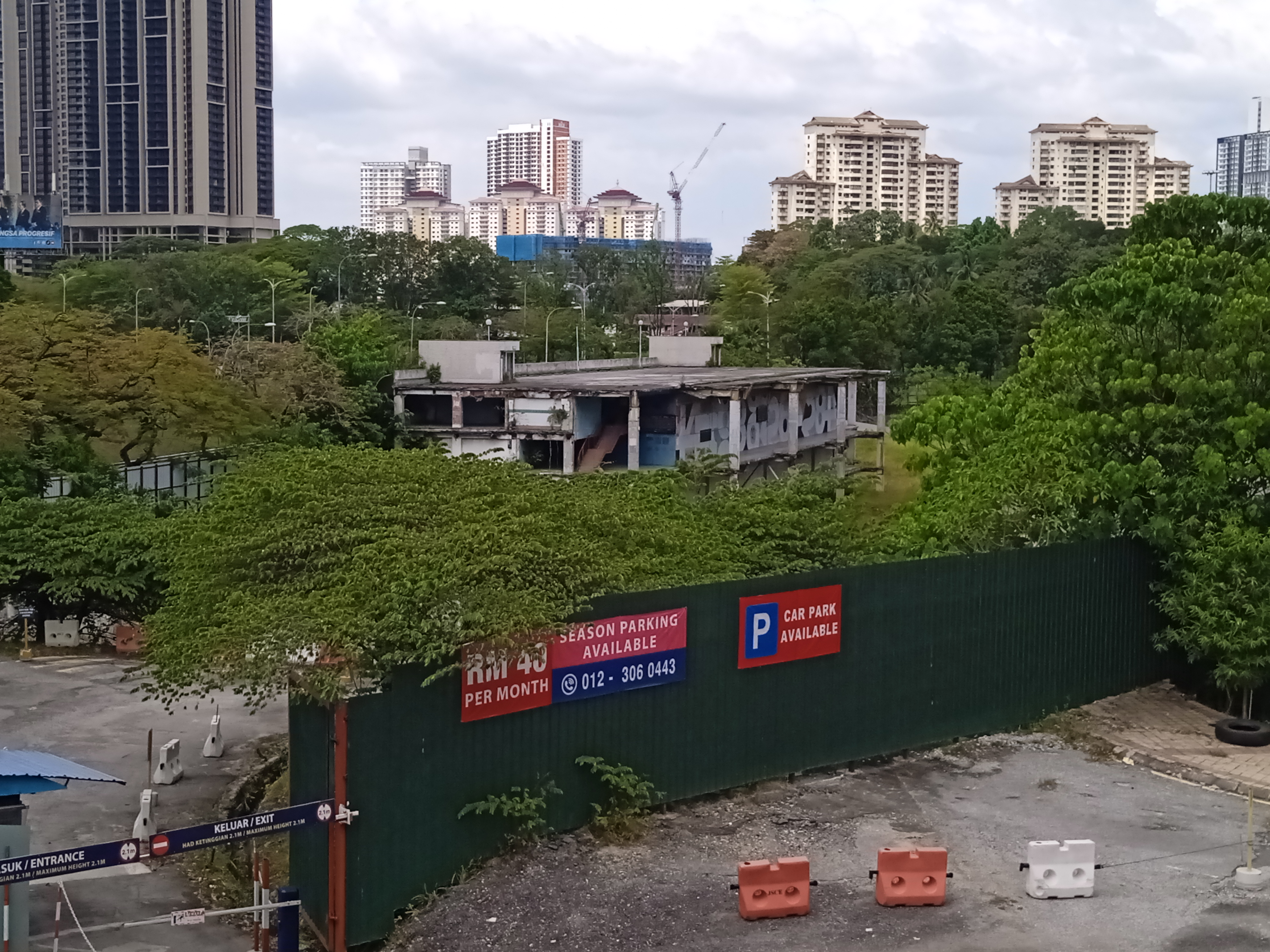
Former Hentian Putra, 2024

TBS was built to relieve the heavily congested Pudu Sentral bus station (formerly and still commonly known as Puduraya) located in the city centre. Initially planned to be the bus station serving southbound express buses, the long-term plan was TBS eventually taking over the remaining express buses at Pudu Sentral, as well as East Coast-bound buses at Hentian Putra and Pekeliling bus stations. It was expected that Pudu Sentral would remain as a city bus station only.

TBS opened for service on 1 January 2011, taking over southbound long-distance bus operations from Pudu Sentral. The ceremonial official opening by the Prime Minister Najib Tun Razak was on 14 April 2013.

Hentian Putra ceased operations on 1 December 2014, with its East Coast-bound bus services moved to TBS.

On 1 November 2015, 545 of the 635 northbound bus operations at Pudu Sentral were moved to TBS, completing the replacement of Pudu Sentral by TBS as the city's main express bus terminal. Pudu Sentral remains in use as a terminal for short-distance buses and stage buses.

=== Location and facilities ===
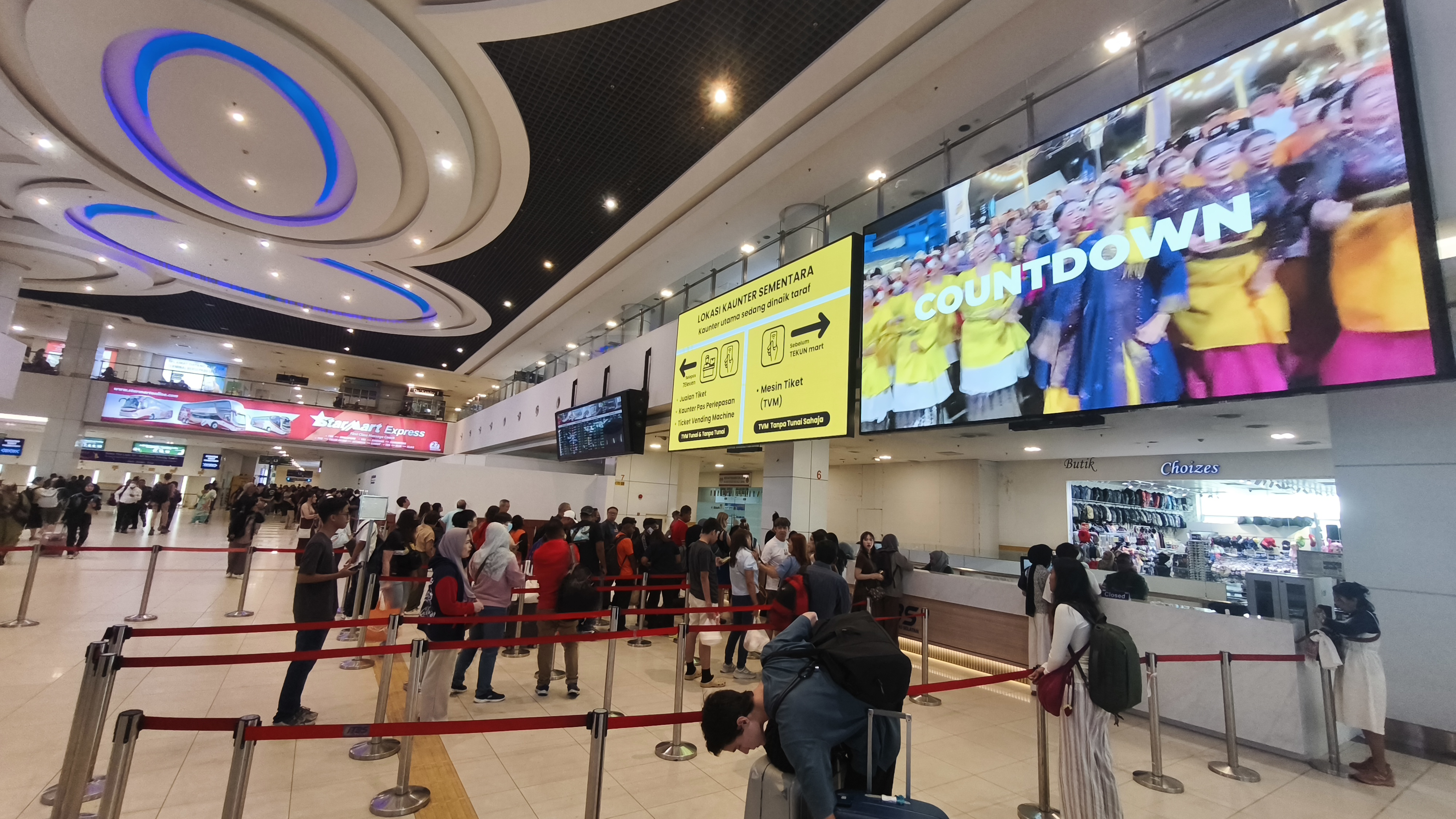
The interior of Terminal Bersepadu Selatan in 2026, displaying digital banners for the fully paperless e-ticketing transition and the closed ticketing counters.

TBS is located approximately 10 km (6.2 mi) south of Kuala Lumpur city centre relieving and bypassing road congestion in the city centre. The proximity of TBS to the Middle Ring Road 2 and Besraya Expressway gives easy access to Malaysia's expressway network.

The terminal has 60 bus platforms, 150 taxi bays and 1,000 parking bays. The terminal is fully accessible and equipped with amenities such as ATMs, baby care rooms, luggage trolleys and luggage storage. Shopping and dining options are available.

In January 2026, the terminal underwent a major digital overhaul, moving completely towards a paperless system. All online bookings were migrated to a new platform managed by Gohub, and the traditional staffed ticketing counters were decommissioned. Passengers are required to purchase tickets online or via mobile apps to obtain a digital QR code, which is scanned directly at the automated turnstiles for entry. This system replaced the older Centralised Ticketing System (CTS) configuration, which previously featured 41 staffed counters and seven ticket vending machines designed to deter touting.

The departure hall is divided into three sections. Only ticket holders are allowed into the departure hall. They are required to go through an auxiliary police security checkpoint.

Designed to handle 5,000 bus trips a day at maximum capacity, TBS handled about 1,300 bus trips daily as of October 2015, prior to the shift of northbound bus operations from Pudu Sentral. As of December 2015, the terminal serves 52,000 travellers per day.

The JPJ Bandar Tasik Selatan branch at Terminal Bersepadu Selatan, opened in 2026.

In June 2026, the Road Transport Department (JPJ) opened its Bandar Tasik Selatan branch on Level 3 of TBS, replacing the former Bandar Sri Permaisuri branch. The branch became the first JPJ office in Kuala Lumpur to operate seven days a week, with counter services extending into the evening.

=== Management ===
The current operator of TBS is Maju Terminal Management Services Sdn Bhd (Maju TMAS). Maju TMAS is a member company of Maju Holdings Berhad.

== Incidents ==
On early morning of Saturday, 21 December 2024 — a riot incident occurred which resulted in the rapidKL train being a "mob attack" target at Bandar Tasik Selatan Station by a group of individuals suspected as Malaysian national football team supporters those who did not accept Malaysia's failure to enter the 2024 ASEAN Championship semifinals started from Malaysia drew 0-0 against Singapore at the Bukit Jalil National Stadium on evening of Friday, 20 December 2024.

== See also ==
- Transport in Malaysia
