= PWTC LRT station =

Metro station in Kuala Lumpur, Malaysia

AG4 SP4 PWTC
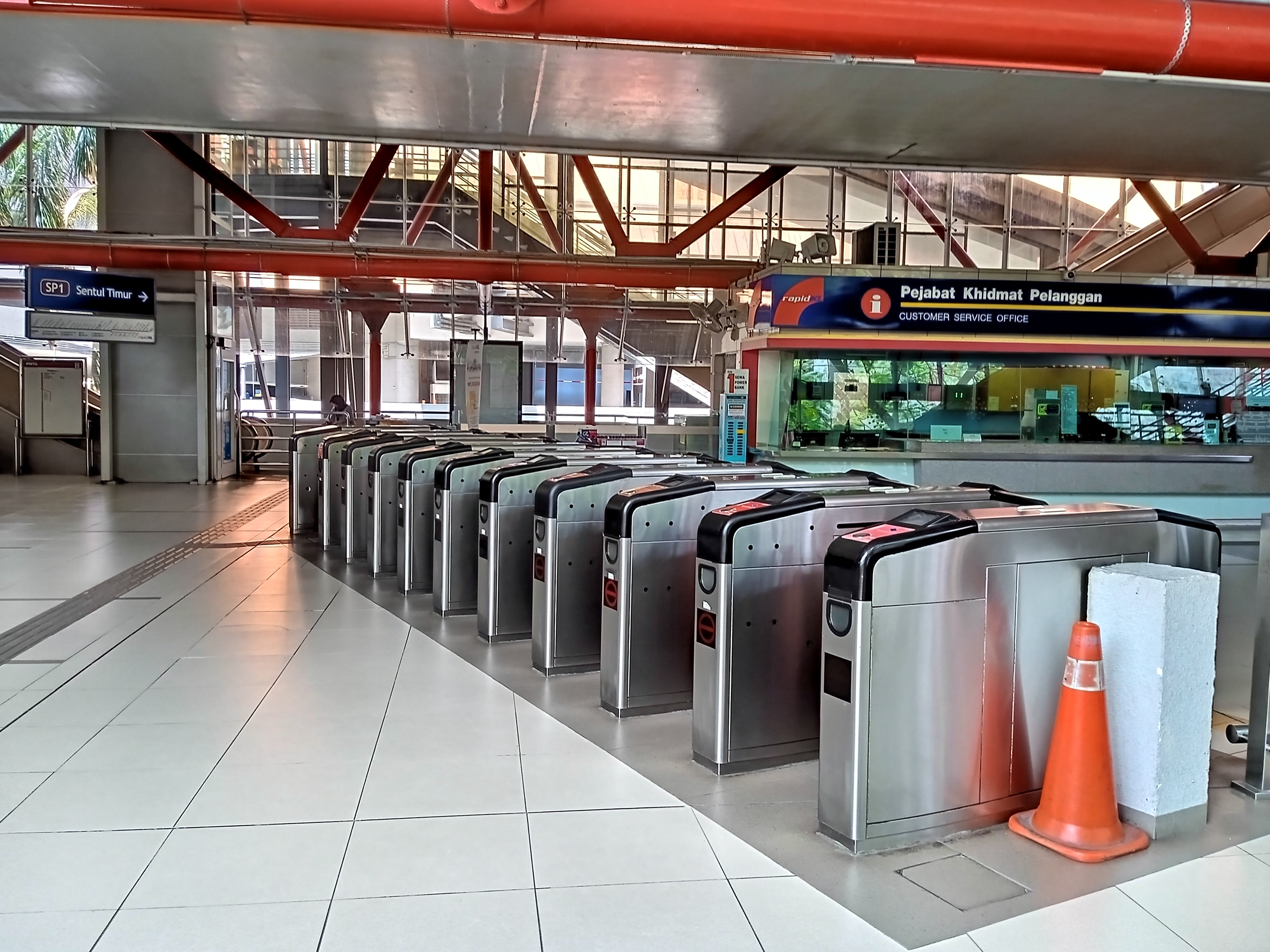
- Concourse view of PWTC station.

General information
- Other names: Malay: ڤوست داݢڠن دنيا ڤوترا (Jawi); Chinese: 太子世界贸易中心; Tamil: புத்ரா பன்னாட்டு வணிக மையம்
- Location: Jalan Putra; 50350 Kuala Lumpur; Malaysia
- Coordinates: 3°9′59″N 101°41′36″E
- System: Rapid KL
- Owner: Prasarana Malaysia
- Operator: Rapid Rail
- Lines: 3 Ampang Line; 4 Sri Petaling Line
- Platforms: 2 side platforms
- Tracks: 2
- Connections: Connecting station to KA04 Putra via a 400-metre pedestrian walkway.

Construction
- Structure type: Elevated
- Platform levels: 2
- Parking: Not available

Other information
- Station code: AG4 SP4

History
- Opened: 6 December 1998; 27 years ago

Services
| Preceding station | | Following station |
|---|---|---|
| Titiwangsa towards Sentul Timur | Ampang Line | Sultan Ismail towards Ampang |
| Titiwangsa towards Sentul Timur | Sri Petaling Line | Sultan Ismail towards Putra Heights |
Location

PWTC LRT station is a light rail transit (LRT) station in Kuala Lumpur that is served by the LRT Ampang Line and LRT Sri Petaling Line. PWTC stands for "Putra World Trade Centre", which was the former name of the World Trade Centre Kuala Lumpur, a major convention and exhibition centre which the station serves.

The station is located within Kuala Lumpur's Golden Triangle region and is only a 45-minute ride from the Kuala Lumpur International Airport (KLIA). It is within walking distance of a mall, restaurants, entertainment centres and 3 - 5 star hotels, many of which are connected by elevated walkways to the station itself. The Sunway Putra Mall is located right next to the station.

Additionally, for about a 400-metre walk from the station, there is the Putra Komuter station served by KTM Komuter's Batu Caves–Pulau Sebang Line and Tanjung Malim–Port Klang Line; the two stations are designated as official connecting stations on official transit maps.

== History ==
The station was opened in the middle of 1998, as part of the second phase of the former STAR LRT system's opening. For the second phase, it consists of a 12 km extension from Chan Sow Lin in Kuala Lumpur to Sri Petaling and a 3 km extension from Sultan Ismail to Sentul Timur. Under Phase 2, a 15 km track with 11 stations was built to serve the northern and southern areas of Kuala Lumpur to cater for the Commonwealth Village and National Sports Complex in Bukit Jalil, during the 1998 Commonwealth Games held in Kuala Lumpur.

== Places of interest ==
- World Trade Centre Kuala Lumpur
- Sunway Putra Mall Shopping Centre and Sunway Putra Hotel
- Dynasty Hotel Kuala Lumpur

== Gallery ==
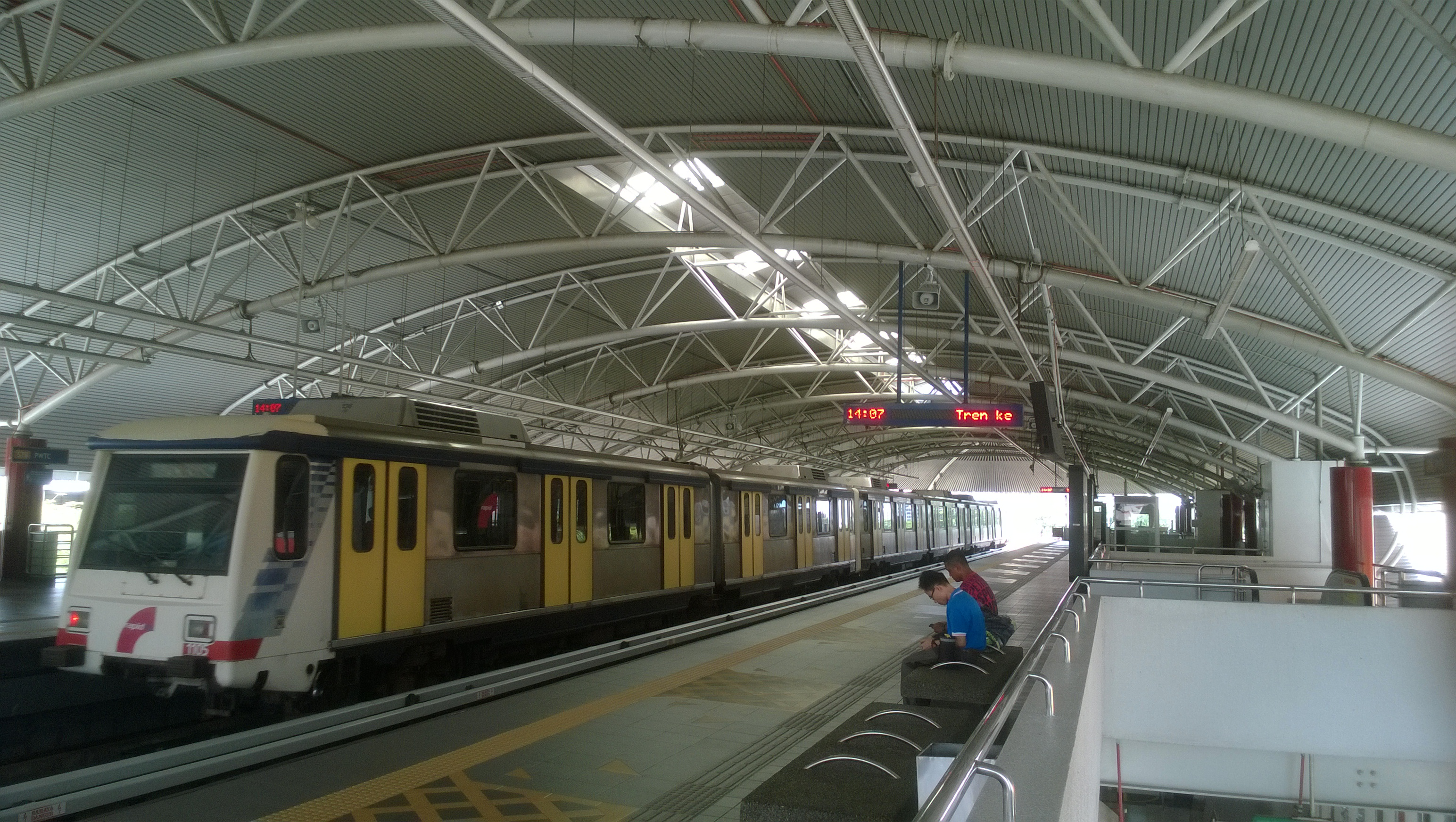
Platform view of the station with the former Adtranz-Walkers EMU train set.
