= Bandar Tasik Selatan =

Township in Federal Territory of Kuala Lumpur, Malaysia

Coordinates: 3.072012°N 101.70958°E

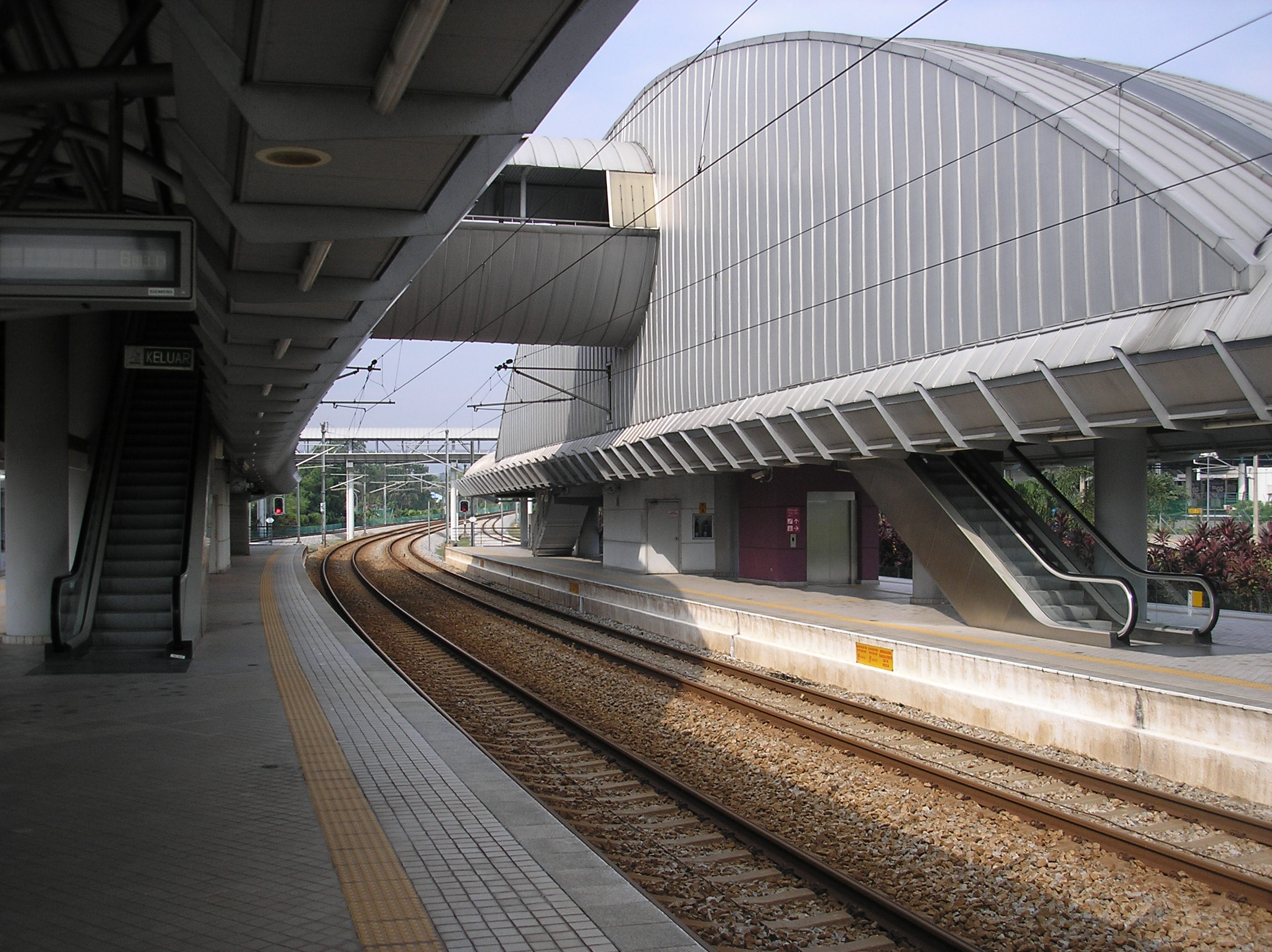
Platforms of the Bandar Tasik Selatan station (ERL), Bandar Tasik Selatan, Kuala Lumpur, Malaysia.

Bandar Tasik Selatan (Malay for South Lake City) is a township in Sungai Besi, Kuala Lumpur, Malaysia. It was established in 1991.

== Transportation ==
Bandar Tasik Selatan is notable for the coterminous Bandar Tasik Selatan railway station, which is a rail interchange with Intercity, KTM Komuter, LRT and KLIA Transit (airport express) services serving this station. The township is also served by the Terminal Bersepadu Selatan Bus Terminal (TBS).

=== Bus services ===
- T410 : Bandar Tasik Selatan station - MRT Taman Connaught
- 581 : Desa Tasik - Hospital Universiti Kebangsaan Malaysia (HUKM) via Bandar Tasik Selatan station - Desa Tasik

Besides the Tasik Selatan station, the Bandar Tasik Selatan Integrated Transport Terminal which includes the TBS Bus terminal intends as one of the major bus transport hubs in Kuala Lumpur is located here.
