= Bank Negara Komuter station =

KTM railway station in Kuala Lumpur, Malaysia

Bank Negara

General information
- Other names: Malay: بڠک نݢارا (Jawi); Chinese: 国家银行; Tamil: பேங்க் நெகாரா
- Location: Jalan Dato' Onn, Kuala Lumpur; Malaysia
- Coordinates: 3°9′16″N 101°41′34″E
- System: KA03 | Commuter rail station
- Owner: Railway Assets Corporation
- Operator: Keretapi Tanah Melayu
- Line: West Coast Line
- Platforms: 2 side platforms
- Tracks: 2
- Connections: Connecting station to AG6 SP6 Bandaraya via a 140-metre pedestrian walkway

Construction
- Structure type: At-grade
- Parking: Not available
- Cycle facilities: Not available
- Accessible: Yes

Other information
- Station code: KA03

History
- Opened: 1995
- Rebuilt: April 2007
- Former names: JPM

Services
Preceding station	Keretapi Tanah Melayu (Komuter)	Following station
Putra towards Batu Caves	Batu Caves–Pulau Sebang Line	Kuala Lumpur towards Pulau Sebang/Tampin
Putra towards Tanjung Malim	Tanjung Malim–Port Klang Line	Kuala Lumpur towards Port Klang

Former services
Sentul - Kuala Lumpur - Port Klang Railbus
Preceding station	Keretapi Tanah Melayu	Following station
The Mall towards Sentul	North–South Line	Kuala Lumpur towards Port Klang
Location

Bank Negara Komuter station is a Malaysian commuter rail at-grade train station in central Kuala Lumpur, named after the Central Bank of Malaysia headquarters located nearby. Part of the KTM West Coast railway line, the station is part of a common KTM Komuter route served by both the Batu Caves–Pulau Sebang Line and the Tanjung Malim–Port Klang Line, making this station an interchange between both lines. It is located on Jalan Dato' Onn. The station is formerly known as the JPM Station, named after the Prime Mininster's Department prior to the construction of the KTM Komuter.

== History ==
Before the electrification works of the West Coast Line began, there was a halt located just about 30 metres before the present location of Bank Negara station. It was a simple shelter with no amenities of any kind – very much like a bus-stop. The diesel engine trains used to serve this route, picking up passengers for as low as RM1.00 per trip for a journey of 23 km to Subang Jaya. Tickets then were sold on board. It has since been dismantled and the location of the former halt is now just a patch of hill-side.

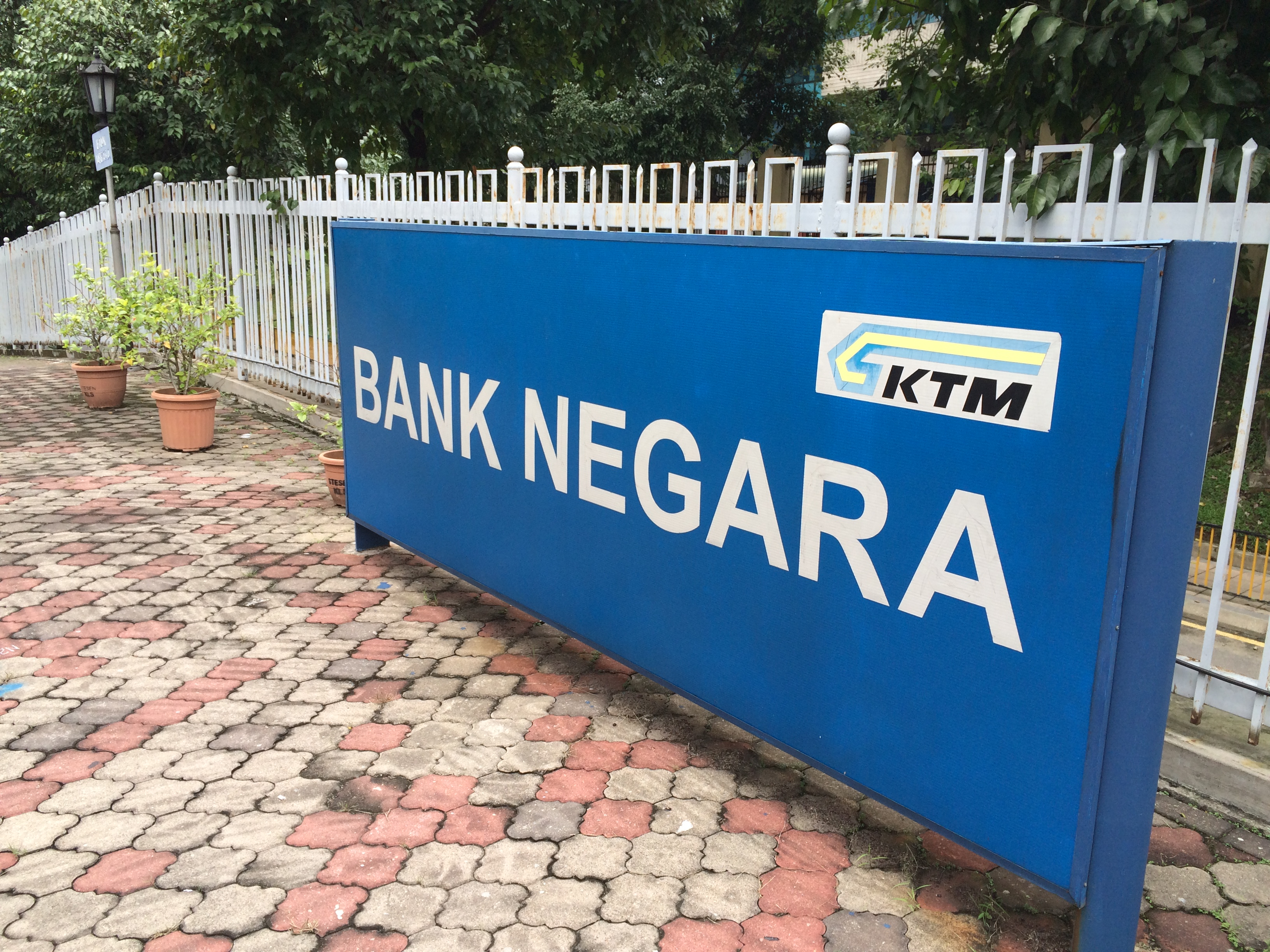
Bank Negara Komuter station

The present station was formed during the double tracking and electrification of railway lines in Kuala Lumpur, Selangor and Negeri Sembilan between 1990 and 1994, in preparation for the launch of KTM Komuter services. Since its opening in 1995, the station has remained unchanged in both its position in the railway system and layout. Beginning June 2007, however, the station underwent major reconstruction (see design).

== Design ==
The Bank Negara halt (March 2007) is one of a few train stations in the KTM Komuter network to be constructed along valley-like terrain.

As with other stationss on the KTM Komuter lines, the Bank Negara station is lined along two electrified railway tracks, each served by one of the station's two side platforms at either side of the tracks. However, having to accommodate the railway lines along a small valley, the station and its platforms were required to be crammed into a rather limited space, with one ticketing concourse placed at one edge of the valley. The Bank Negara station initially did not feature a centralised ticketing concourse, but was rather designed with two, each intended for either platform. Accordingly the station did not feature a footbridge in itself, instead relying on a road bridge outside the station as for passengers crossing over the railway tracks and between two platforms. Owing to its lack of importance managing other responsibilities along the railway line other than Komuter services, the station only houses ticketing facilities for Komuter trains, including ticket counters and ticket vending machines, fare gates, and a small staff.

Fare tickets could be bought with local currency using a combination of coins and notes at the ticket vending machines. There were two ticketing areas – one on each side of the track. There are also dedicated fare gates on each side that accepted contactless value-stored cards. Unlike most stations, commuters were not allowed to cross between the two sides, once passed the gates, without going through the fare gates again.

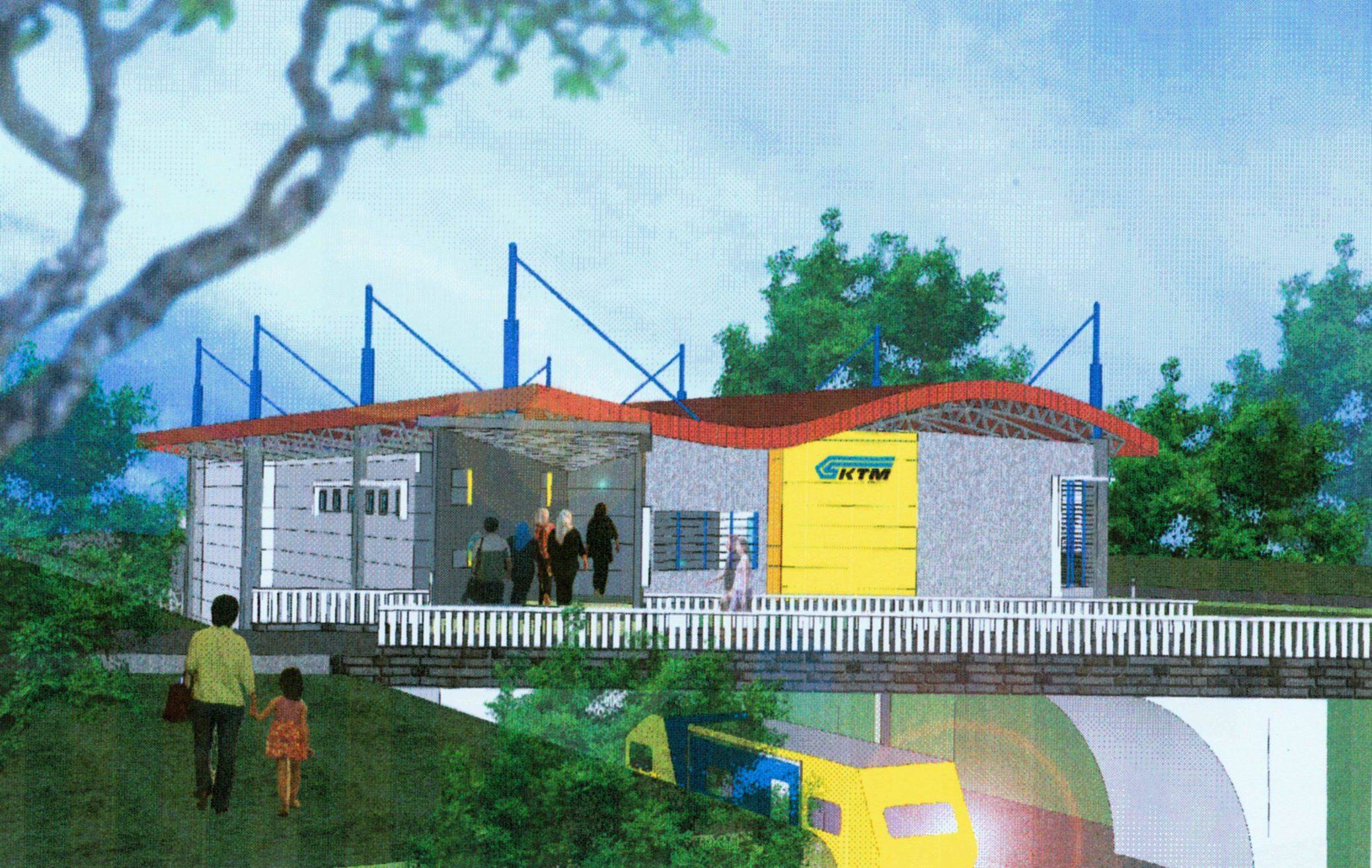
Artist impression of the upgraded Bank Negara halt

Renovation works to upgrade the station began in April 2007. The new station will have a new concourse over the tracks and platforms. The new concourse will have a centralised ticketing booth, ticket vending machines, prayer area and retail outlets. It will also have a common entrance to the two platforms where previously they could only be accessed through separate gates. The new halt will also have elevators for passengers to access the platforms, making the halt disabled-friendly. The weather shelters will be replaced with a single high-cover over the entire waiting area on both sides and over the tracks. The renovation works, which cost RM6 million, were expected to be completed by mid October 2007. The station however continued to operate although certain areas were closed off and the entrances relocated.

Renovations were not completed as of January 2008. The covered platforms were only about 90% completed. The areas nearer the new main lobby were not fully constructed yet – having only some support frames on both sides. In fact, it is observed that the entire roof of the main lobby was redesigned. The original design structure (as per picture) was erected but after about 2 months, they were dismantled and in January 2008, a new roof structure was erected.

== Interchange ==
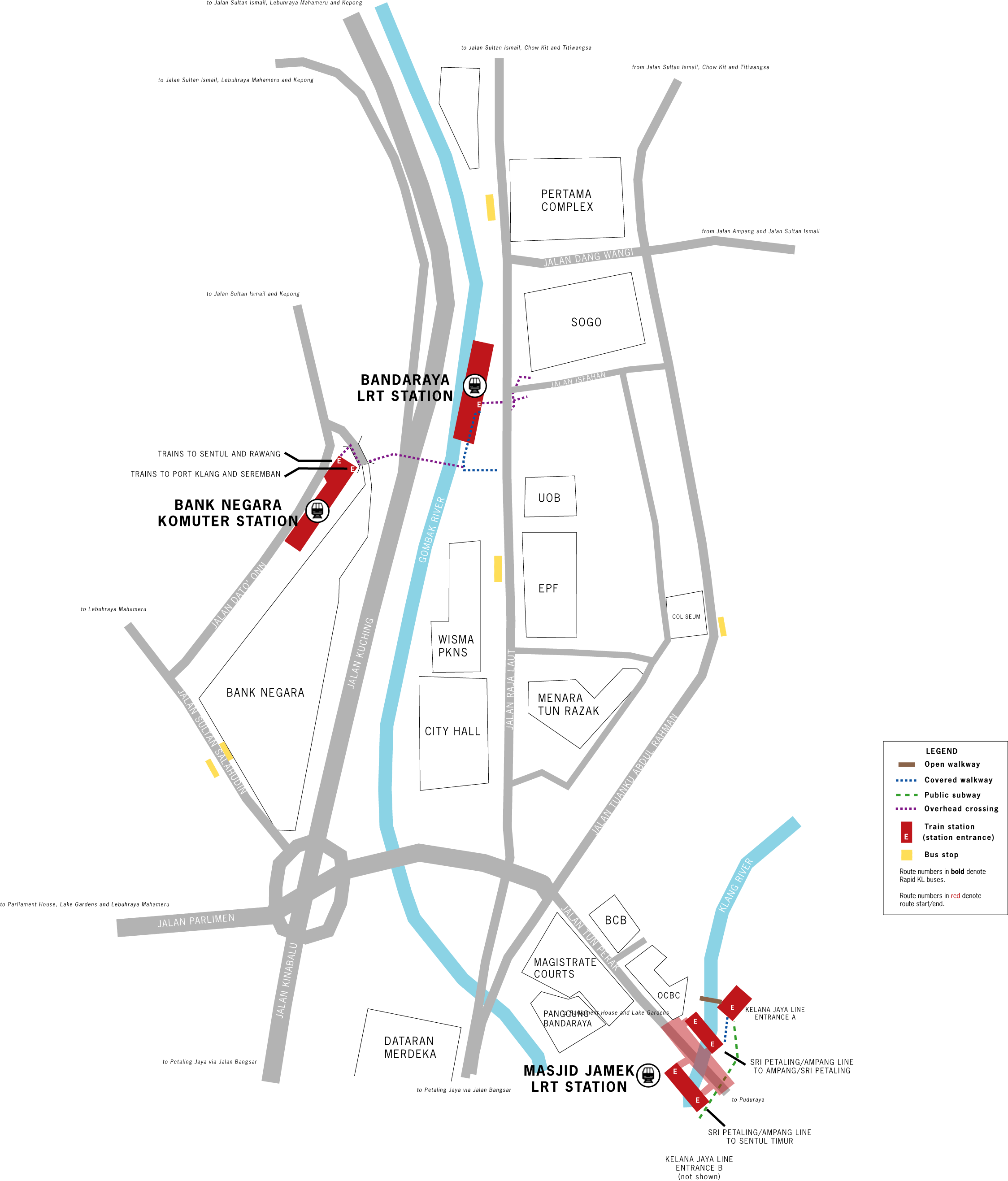
A map illustrating the layout of the Bank Negara halt's connections with connected stations. The Komuter station is situated left.

While not well-integrated, the Bank Negara station was initially designated in official transit maps as an interchange station with the Ampang and Sri Petaling lines' Bandaraya LRT station. This has since been redefined as connecting stations as Bank Negara and Bandaraya did not share an integrated paid-area. Changes between the stations require that one exit either stations and cross a footbridge that crosses Jalan Kuching and the Gombak River. The estimated walking distance between the stations is 140 m. The Ampang and Sri Petaling Lines station is situated nearby bus stops along Jalan Raja Laut, Jalan Dang Wangi and Jalan Tuanku Abdul Rahman.
