= Kuala Lumpur International Book Fair =

Malaysian book fair

Kuala Lumpur International Book Fair Pesta Buku Antarabangsa Kuala Lumpur
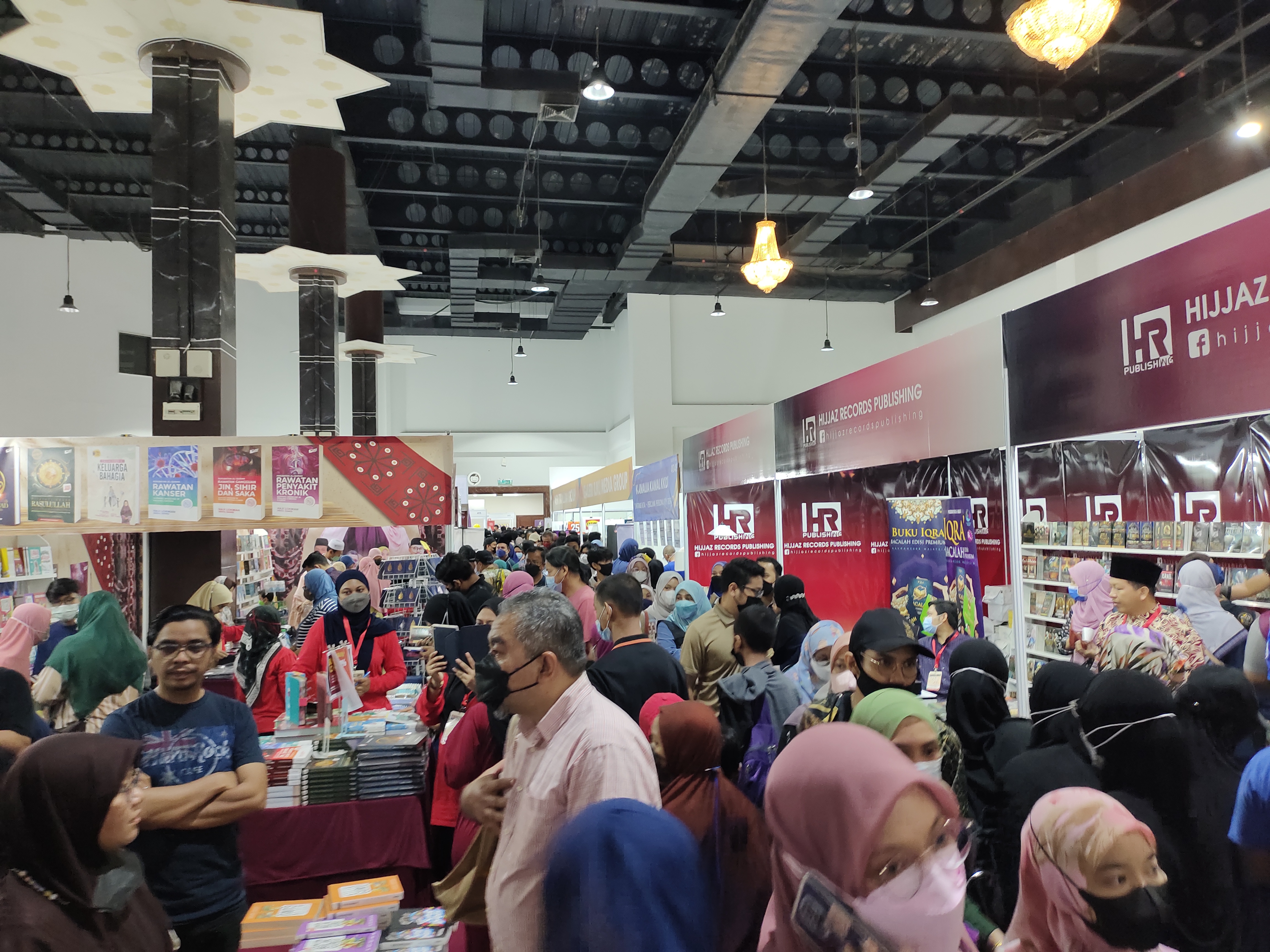
- Visitors of Kuala Lumpur International Book Fair 2022 which was held at World Trade Centre Kuala Lumpur
- Status: Active
- Frequency: Annually, usually in May or June
- Locations: World Trade Centre Kuala Lumpur (1991–2015, 2017–present); Malaysia Agro Exposition Park Serdang (2016)
- Inaugurated: 1981
- Organizer: Majlis Buku Kebangsaan Malaysia
- Website: klibf.my

The Kuala Lumpur International Book Fair (KLIBF; Malay: Pesta Buku Antarabangsa Kuala Lumpur) is an annual book fair held in Malaysia since 1981. It initially moved between locations until the World Trade Centre Kuala Lumpur became its official venue. The fair was initiated by the Ministry of Education Malaysia through the Majlis Buku Kebangsaan Malaysia (lit. 'National Book Council of Malaysia') with support from local businesses.

== History ==
After 1972 was designated International Book Year by UNESCO, various literary exhibitions ran by book publishers were initiated to promote reading. In Malaysia, small-scale exhibitions were done individually by different publication companies scattered across the country until 1975.

In 1976, the Malaysian Book Publishers Association (MABOPA) suggested a centralized exhibition for all the book publishers in Malaysia to improve marketability. The "National Book Exhibition" as it was called was then held at the Kuala Lumpur and Selangor Chinese Assembly Hall (KLSCAH).

It was renamed to the "Malaysian Book Festival" in 1982, and was officially launched at Tunku Canselor Hall, University of Malaya. After that, the venue for the event was changed to Changkat Pavilion, Kuala Lumpur in 1988.

In 1991, the exhibition was relocated to the World Trade Centre Kuala Lumpur and was renamed "Kuala Lumpur International Book Fair" in order to accommodate the role international publishers played in supplying books for the event. The fair has since been held there, except in 2016 where the event was held at the Malaysia Agro Exposition Park Serdang (MAEPS) instead. This was criticized by event organizers due to its location having poor accessibility in transportation and lack of public utilities.

The number of visitors at the KLIBF peaked at 2.4 million in 2014, and in recent years at least 1 million visitors participated in the event annually.

=== 2020s ===
The KLIBF was not held in 2020 and 2021 due to the COVID-19 pandemic. In 2022, at least 1.36 million visitors participated in the event, exceeding the earlier expectation of 700,000 visitors.

The 40th event was held from 26 May to 3 June 2023, and was launched in the presence of prime minister Anwar Ibrahim. TikTok was reported to have played an important role in promoting the venue to younger generations. Various international publishing companies such as Oxford University Press, Elsevier, John Wiley participated in the event.
