= Seremban railway station =

Railway station in Negeri Sembilan, Malaysia

Seremban

- The still operational pre-war station building of the Seremban railway station.

General information
- Other names: Malay: سرمبن (Jawi); Chinese: 芙蓉; Tamil: சிரம்பான்
- Location: Seremban; Negeri Sembilan; Malaysia
- Coordinates: 2°43′8″N 101°56′26″E
- Owner: Railway Assets Corporation
- Operator: Keretapi Tanah Melayu
- Line: West Coast Line
- Platforms: 1 side platform and 1 island platform
- Tracks: 3

Construction
- Structure type: At-grade
- Parking: Available
- Accessible: Yes

Other information
- Station code: KB13

History
- Opened: 1910
- Electrified: 1995

Services
Preceding station	KTM Komuter	Following station
Tiroi towards Batu Caves	Batu Caves–Pulau Sebang Line	Senawang towards Pulau Sebang/Tampin
Preceding station	ETS	Following station
Kajang towards KL Sentral	KL Sentral–JB Sentral (Platinum)	Pulau Sebang/Tampin towards JB Sentral
Bandar Tasik Selatan towards Padang Besar	Padang Besar–JB Sentral (Platinum)	Pulau Sebang/Tampin towards JB Sentral
Bandar Tasik Selatan towards Butterworth	Butterworth–JB Sentral (Platinum)	Pulau Sebang/Tampin towards JB Sentral
Kajang towards Padang Besar	Padang Besar–JB Sentral (Gold)	Pulau Sebang/Tampin towards JB Sentral
Kajang towards Butterworth	Butterworth–Segamat (Gold)	Pulau Sebang/Tampin towards Segamat
Location

Facade of the station's main entrance

The Seremban railway station is a Malaysian railway station located in the heart of Seremban, the capital of the state of Negeri Sembilan.

The station is served by KTM ETS train services, as well as KTM Komuter's Batu Caves–Pulau Sebang Line service, introduced in 1995 as the "Seremban Line". The station is also the former southern terminus, and former namesake, of the Komuter line.

The station was once the starting point of the branch line to Port Dickson which served oil train traffic, before being closed in 2008 with the branch line undergoing dismantling in 2022. Plans have been considered to revive the Port Dickson branch line, although none have came to fruition as of yet.

Since December 2025, the station is under development by Sunway.

== History ==
The station was constructed between 1904 and 1910 at a cost of RM26,000.00, having long served earlier railway companies before the Malayan Railway Administration (now, Keretapi Tanah Melayu) took over responsibilities of managing all lines in British Malaya in 1948. The station continued to offer KTM Intercity train services along the West Coast Line, as well as offering goods deliveries.

From 6 February 1994 to 12 April 1994, the station underwent extensive remodeling in preparation for the launch of the Rawang-Seremban stretch of the KTM Komuter commuter train services. The renovation saw the retrofitting of new KTM Komuter facilities into the station, as well as the raising of all platforms in the station to support easier access in and out of KTM locomotives and coaches.

It was the southern terminus of the KTM Komuter's Rawang-Seremban route (eventually named Seremban Line) since 1995 when the KTM Komuter service began, until the line was extended to Sungai Gadut in 2011. In 2015, the KTM Komuter Southern Shuttle service was introduced resulting in Seremban being the terminus again. The shuttle's southern terminus was Gemas, which was eventually changed to Pulau Sebang/Tampin. It was also at this point when the KTM ETS services was extended to Gemas, replacing former KTM Intercity services. The northern branch of the Seremban Line was swapped with that of the Port Klang Line as part of a trial service in 2015, which was eventually made permanent with the line now terminating at Batu Caves. In 2016, the shuttle service was merged with the Seremban Line, making Pulau Sebang/Tampin the terminus of the line, although some trains will terminate at Sungai Gadut at off-peak times. The line was eventually renamed the Batu Caves–Pulau Sebang Line to reflect its current termini.

In 19 January 2024, a new station building will be constructed at the current station site. The original station building will be incorporated within the new station. Its clock tower has been repaired and the older station is upgraded with modernised electric wiring. It was scheduled to be completed by January 2026, but due to relocating underground facilities and cables, the completion date is postponed to March 2027.

Sunway Group is also building a residential, commercial, office, and medical complex to be integrated with Seremban Station as Seremban Sentral, which is planned to be completed in two phases up to 2030 and 2039.

== Platforms ==
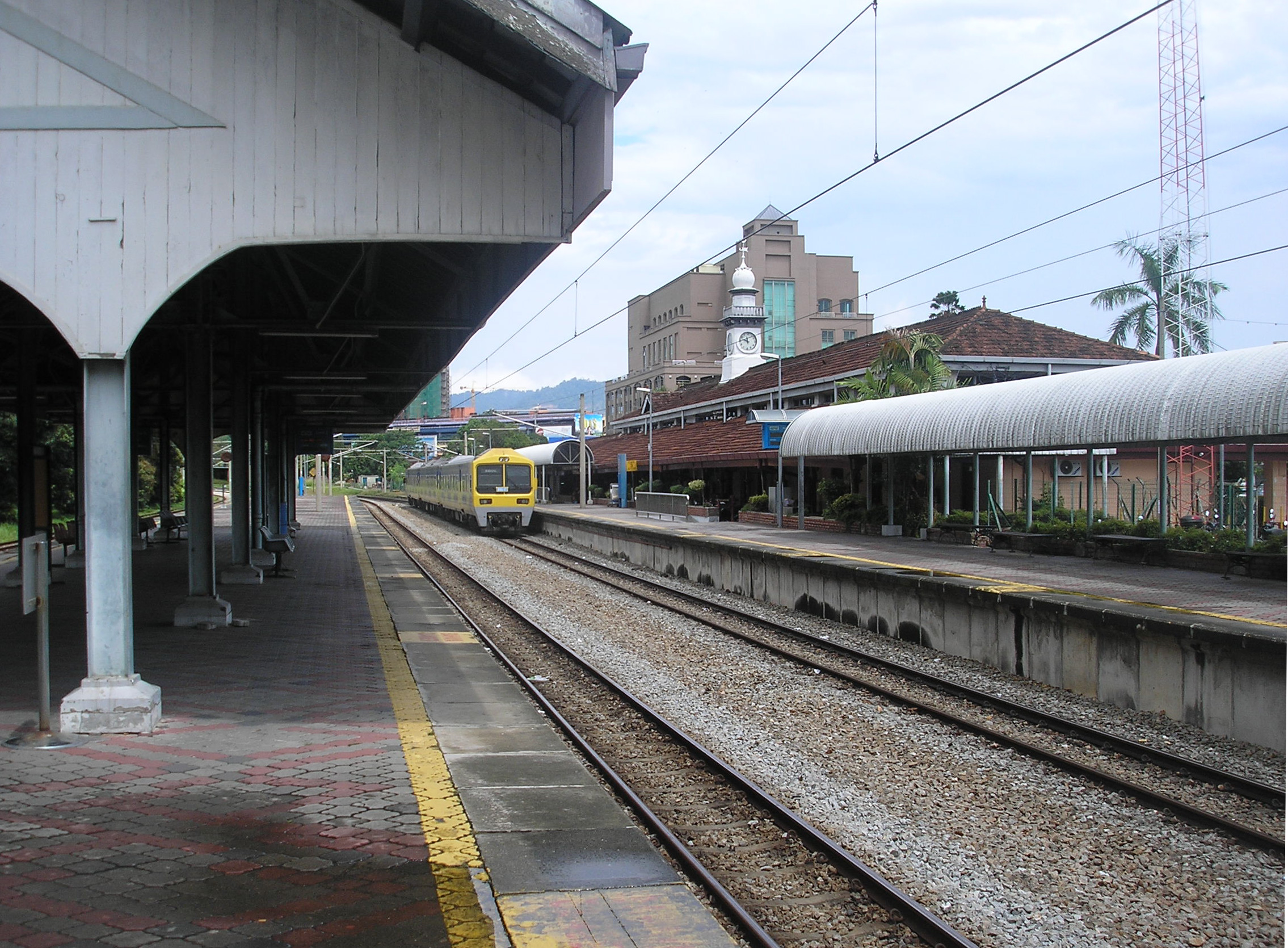
The Seremban railway station, as seen from one of its platforms. Note the line used by a KTM Komuter train (along platform 1), which is frequently used by Komuter trains along the Batu Caves–Pulau Sebang Line.

The station contains three platforms connected by a link bridge. Because the station used to serve as a terminus for the KTM Komuter service, only one track was needed for the service, used as a final stop for its southbound journey and the beginning of its northbound journey (like most Electric multiple units (EMUs), the KTM Komuter rolling stock is capable of moving backwards or forwards). However, all lines and platforms are currently in use.

The northbound trains stop at platform 1, a side platform directly adjoining the station building. Platforms 2 and 3 are situated on an island platform covered by a metal-framed and wooden shade, and serve southbound Komuter and ETS trains.

Platform 1 is currently not in service due to upgrading track and station upgrading works.

== Architecture ==
The original station is essentially fashioned in a simplistic form, consisting of an oblong-planned one storey station building containing station offices at the southern half of the station, and ticketing facilities and the passenger concourse in the northern half of the building; a brick-and-plaster entranceway was also included in its earlier iteration. The station features verandahs supported by carved wooden beams sporting curved motives.

The original station is covered by two layers of hip roofs: One at the bottom cut at the top by a smaller one with a large gable. A white clock tower is erected atop the roof of the building, topped by an onion dome. The top of the roof is adorned by wooden carvings and small pinnacles on its upper ends.

== Location ==
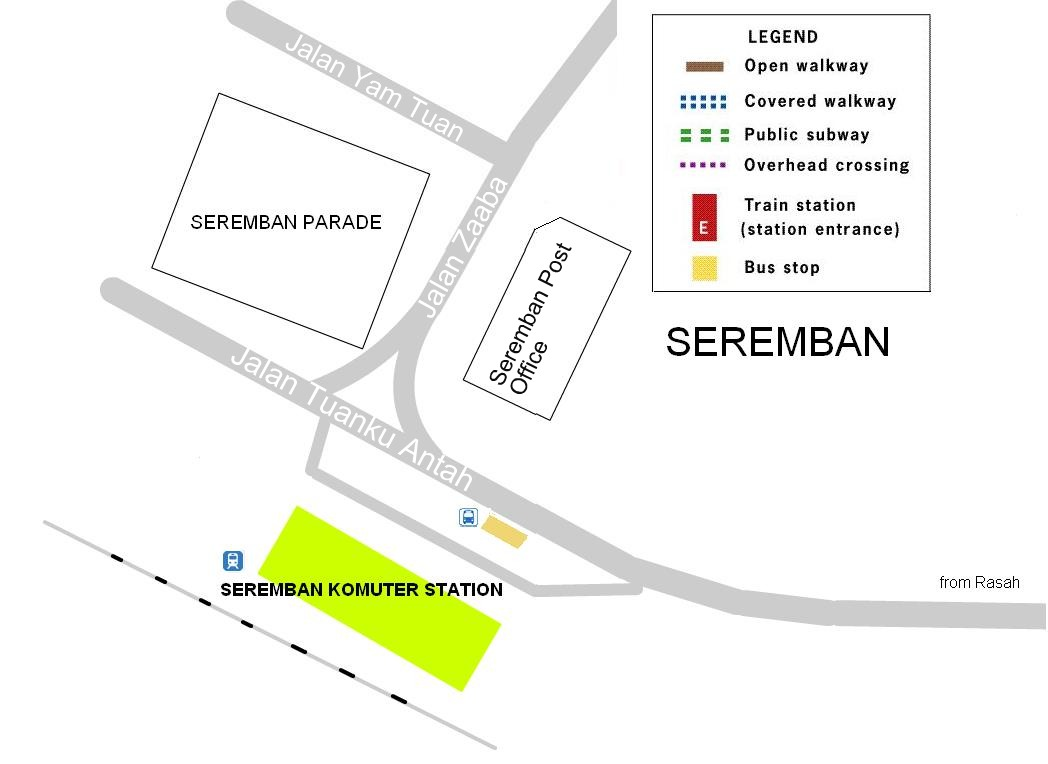

== Around the station ==
- Tuanku Ja'afar Royal Gallery
- Seremban Lake Gardens
- Seremban Prima Mall
- Seremban Sentral Residences
- Terminal 1
- SMK King George V
