= Putra Komuter station =

Malaysian commuter train halt

Putra

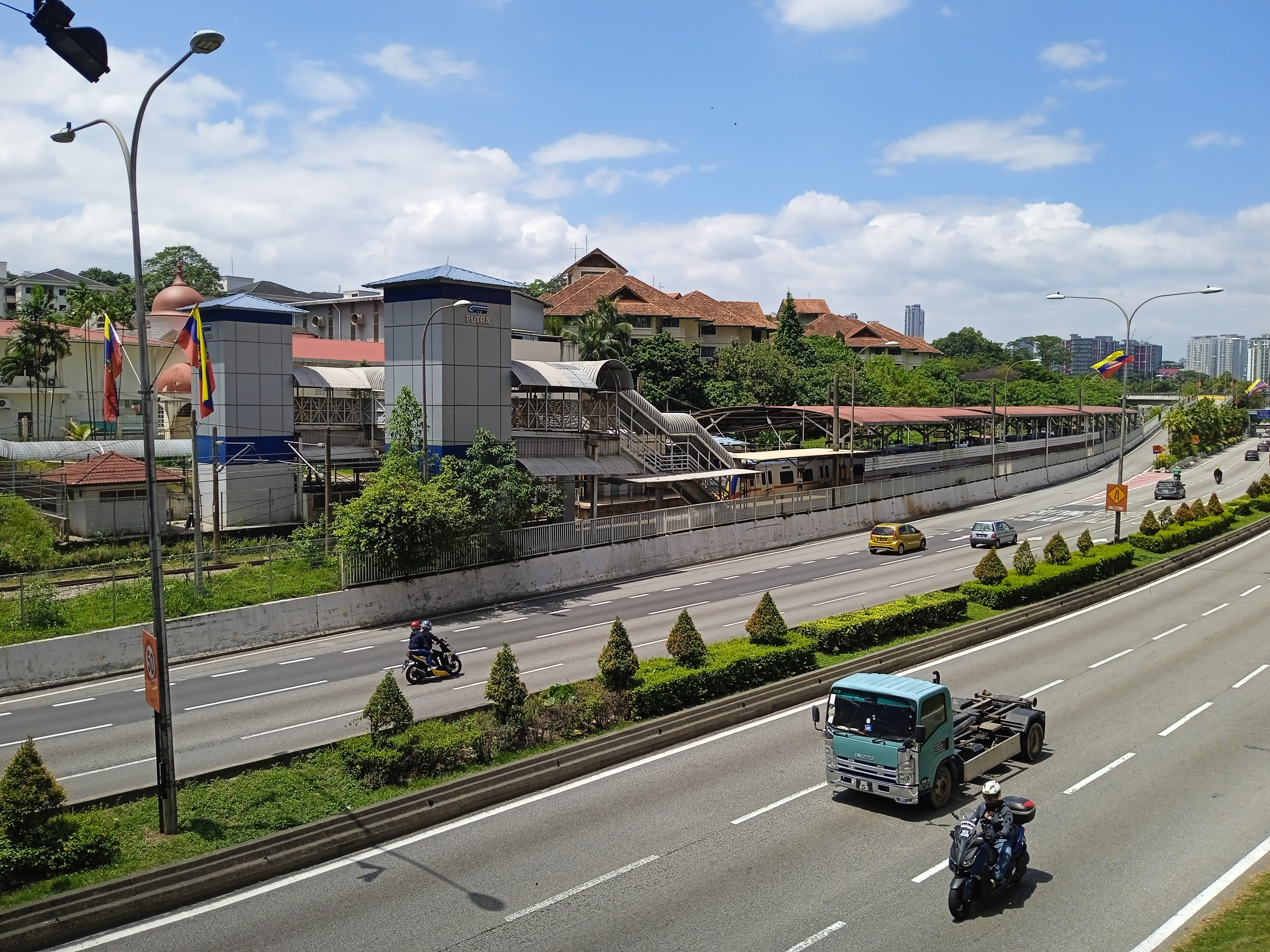

General information
- Other names: Malay: ڤوترا (Jawi); Chinese: 布特拉; Tamil: புத்ரா
- Location: Jalan Tun Ismail, Kuala Lumpur; Malaysia
- Coordinates: 3°09′56″N 101°41′27″E
- System: KA04 | Commuter rail station
- Owner: Railway Assets Corporation
- Operator: Keretapi Tanah Melayu
- Line: West Coast Line
- Platforms: 2 side platforms
- Tracks: 2
- Connections: Connecting station to AG4 SP4 PWTC via pedestrian walkway

Construction
- Parking: Not available
- Accessible: Yes

Other information
- Station code: KA04

History
- Opened: 1995

Services
| Preceding station | Keretapi Tanah Melayu (Komuter) | Following station |
|---|---|---|
| Sentul towards Batu Caves | Batu Caves–Pulau Sebang Line | Bank Negara towards Pulau Sebang/Tampin |
| Segambut towards Tanjung Malim | Tanjung Malim–Port Klang Line | Bank Negara towards Port Klang |
Location

The Putra Komuter station is a Malaysian commuter rail train station in Kuala Lumpur. It is named in part after the World Trade Centre Kuala Lumpur (formerly known as the Putra World Trade Centre).

Part of the KTM West Coast railway line, the station is part of a common KTM Komuter route served by both the Batu Caves–Pulau Sebang Line (which continues on a branch line towards Batu Caves) and the Tanjung Malim–Port Klang Line (which continues on the main line towards Tanjung Malim). The station is also the northernmost station on the KTM Komuter network where trains from both lines stop, acting as an interchange for both lines.

== History ==
During British colonial rule, there existed a halt known as Maxwell Road Halt on this site, named after the nearby former Maxwell Road (now Jalan Tun Ismail).

The halt was re-built during the double tracking and electrification of railway lines in Kuala Lumpur, Selangor and Negeri Sembilan between 1990 and 1994 to primarily serve KTM Komuter services. Since beginning operations with the launch of KTM Komuter in 1995, the station has remained relatively unchanged in both its position in the railway system and station design. In mid-2007 the station underwent one significant upgrade.

== Design ==
The station has two side platforms at either side of two electrified railway tracks. Because of its specific use as a Komuter stop, Putra station is merely a designated minor station with a single two-room building housing limited staff members, and originally designed to offer only ticketing services, including both manual and ticket vending machines, and fare gates. A footbridge was included to link both platforms. Due to its location close to a major roadway (Jalan Kuching), the station also features one unusually narrow platform. The station underwent upgrading of a platform canopy in mid-2007.

== Transport connections ==
The station is located 400–500 m from PWTC on the Ampang and Sri Petaling Lines of the Rapid Rail transit system. Designated as connecting stations, walking between the two stations is possible through an overhead pedestrian bridge across Jalan Kuching.

The former Putra Bus Terminal (closed on 1 December 2014), which served buses to Peninsular Malaysia's East Coast destinations, was 300 m away.

The Putra Komuter halt prior to a canopy upgrade in mid-2007
