= Batu Caves–Pulau Sebang Line =

Railway line in Malaysia

KTM Batu Caves–Pulau Sebang Line

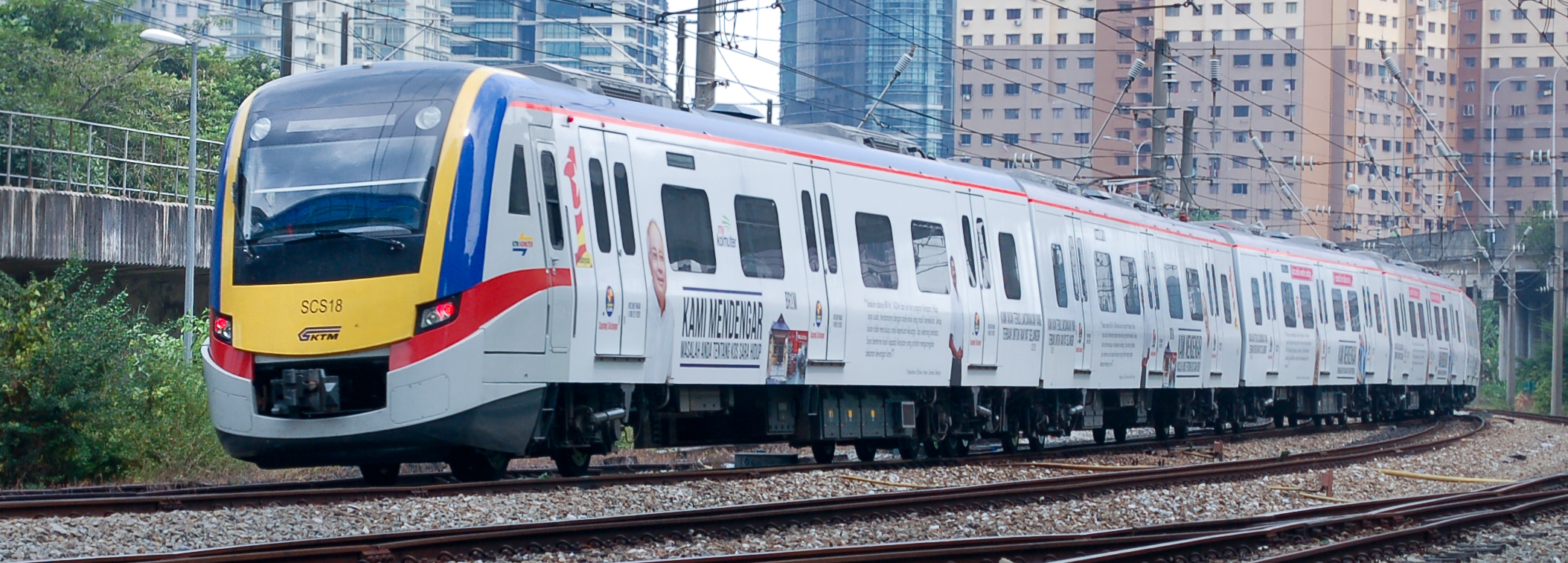
- KTM Class 92 train at Bangsar

Overview
- Native name: KTM Laluan Batu Caves–Pulau Sebang
- Status: Operational
- Owner: Keretapi Tanah Melayu
- Line number: 1 (blue)
- Locale: Selangor; Kuala Lumpur; Negeri Sembilan; Malacca
- Termini: KC05 Batu Caves; KB17 Pulau Sebang/Tampin
- Stations: 27 + 3 reserve stations
- Website: www.ktmb.com.my

Service
- Type: Commuter Rail (S-train)
- System: KTM Komuter; Klang Valley Integrated Transit System
- Operator: Keretapi Tanah Melayu
- Depot: Seremban
- Rolling stock: KTM Class 92 Komuter CSR EMU; 37 six-car trains

History
- Opened: 14 August 1995; 31 years ago

Technical
- Line length: 135 km (84 mi)
- Character: Mostly At Grade
- Track gauge: 1,000 mm (3 ft 3 3/8 in) metre gauge
- Electrification: 25 kV 50 Hz AC Overhead line
- Operating speed: Up to 125 km/h (78 mph)

Location of the Batu Caves-Pulau Sebang Line

The KTM Batu Caves–Pulau Sebang Line (Malay: KTM Laluan Batu Caves–Pulau Sebang), formerly known as the Seremban Line (Malay: Laluan Seremban) is one of the three KTM Komuter Central Sector lines provided by Keretapi Tanah Melayu. Its electric trains run between Batu Caves and Pulau Sebang/Tampin. Prior to 15 December 2015, the northern terminus of this line was Rawang.

KTM Komuter is an electrified commuter train service first introduced in 1995, catering especially to commuters in Kuala Lumpur and the surrounding suburban areas. It is a popular mode of transportation for commuters working in Kuala Lumpur, as they can travel to the city without the hassle of traffic congestion. Coaches are modern and air-conditioned. For those who drive to the stations/halts, 'Park & Ride' facility is provided at a nominal charge.

The system is one of the components of the Klang Valley Integrated Transit System. The line is numbered 1 and coloured blue on official transit maps. It was initially named after its former terminus, Seremban station.

== Line information ==
=== History ===
The line began as part of the Selangor Government Railway which opened in 1886. The modern-day Seremban Line began as a spur line, opened in 1895, from the Kuala Lumpur-Klang railway line beginning from Resident station, through the Sultan Street station, Pudu station and Sungai Besi, before reaching Kajang in 1897.

The line was later re-routed through Seputeh, with the Sultan Street-Pudu stretch being demolished and incorporated into the LRT Ampang Line. The Rawang–Seremban stretch and the Sentul–Port Klang stretch were electrified in the early 1990s.

Another branch line from Seremban-Port Dickson opened in 1891. The line is also known as a "Zig Zag Line" until in the 1970s. when the few stations has closed. In 2008, the line closed with the branch line undergoing dismantling in 2022.

An infill station, the Kajang 2 station, was constructed between Kajang station and UKM station. It commenced operations on Monday, 13 March 2023, with the official launch of the station done a month later on 14 April 2023 by the Minister of Transport, Anthony Loke.

=== Stations ===
⇄ = cross-platform interchange

Station code	Station name	Platform type	Interchange station/Notes
KC05	Batu Caves	Island & Side	Northern terminus.
KC04	Taman Wahyu	Side	
KC03	Kampung Batu	Side	Connecting station to PY13 MRT Putrajaya Line.
KC02	Batu Kentonmen	Side	
KC01	Sentul	Island & Side	
KA04	Putra	Side	Connecting station to AG4 SP4 PWTC on the LRT Ampang & Sri Petaling Lines via a 600-meter pedestrian bridge. ⇄ KTM Tanjung Malim-Port Klang Line
KA03	Bank Negara	Side	Connecting station to AG6 SP6 Bandaraya on the LRT Ampang & Sri Petaling Lines via a 250-meter pedestrian bridge crossing the Gombak River and Jalan Kuching. ⇄ KTM Tanjung Malim-Port Klang Line
KA02	Kuala Lumpur	Island & Side	Connecting station to KJ14 KG16 Pasar Seni on the LRT Kelana Jaya Line and MRT Kajang Line via a 200-meter pedestrian walkway crossing the Klang River. ⇄ KTM Tanjung Malim-Port Klang Line & KTM ETS
KA01	KL Sentral	Island	Connecting station to: KJ15 LRT Kelana Jaya Line; KE1 KT1 ERL KLIA Ekspres and ERL KLIA Transit; Linkbridge access to MR1 KL Sentral Monorail on the KL Monorail Line via NU Sentral shopping mall; Linkbridge access to KG15 Muzium Negara on the MRT Kajang Line.; Feeder bus T819 to KG13 Pusat Bandar Damansara on the MRT Kajang Line. ⇄ KTM Tanjung Malim-Port Klang Line, KS01 KTM KL Sentral-Terminal Skypark Line & KTM ETS
KB01	Mid Valley	Side	Link-bridge access to KD01 KJ17 Abdullah Hukum on the KTM Tanjung Malim-Port Klang Line and LRT Kelana Jaya Line via KL Eco City, Gardens Mall and Mid Valley Megamall.
KB02	Seputeh	Side	
KB03	Salak Selatan	Side	
KB04	Bandar Tasik Selatan	Side	Connecting station to: SP15 LRT Sri Petaling Line; KT2 ERL KLIA Transit; Terminal Bersepadu Selatan (TBS) Bus Hub; Feeder bus T410 to KG26 Taman Connaught on the MRT Kajang Line. ⇄ KTM ETS
KB05	Serdang	Side	Buses to Mines Wellness City, Putrajaya and Cyberjaya. Feeder bus T565 to PY33 Serdang Jaya on the MRT Putrajaya Line from Flat Taman Muhibbah.
KB06	Kajang	Island & Side	Connecting station to KG35 MRT Kajang Line. ⇄ KTM ETS Proposed connecting station with 14 Putrajaya Monorail.
KB06A	Kajang 2	Side	
KB07	UKM	Side	Half-hourly shuttle buses to National University of Malaysia (UKM) are available through a 300-meter walk to the bus stop.
KB08	Bangi	Island & Side	
KB09	Batang Benar	Side	
KB10	Nilai	Side	Shuttle bus to Kuala Lumpur International Airport (KLIA).
KB11	Labu	Side	Proposed connecting station to the HSR Kuala Lumpur–Singapore High Speed Rail (HSR) (shelved).
KB12	Tiroi	Side	
KB13	Seremban	Island & Side	Proposed connecting station to ERL KLIA Transit and ERL KLIA Ekspres lines extension to Seremban. ⇄ KTM ETS
KB14	Senawang	Side	
KB15	Sungai Gadut	Island	Peak hour terminal station.
KB16	Rembau	Island & Side	
KB17	Pulau Sebang/Tampin	Island & Side	Southern terminus. ⇄ KTM ETS The station is 1 km (0.62 mi) from Tampin Bus Terminal as it is located at Pulau Sebang on the Melaka side of the border. Buses cost around RM5.00 between Melaka Sentral in Malacca City and Tampin and take around one hour, depending on traffic. Taxis cost RM35.00 upwards one way.

=== Future expansion ===
A station serving the Royal Malaysian Police (PDRM) headquarters at Bukit Aman is being planned, to be built between the old Kuala Lumpur station and Bank Negara station.

=== Former Seremban-Gemas Shuttle Service ===
On 1 October 2015, KTMB announced the introduction of the Seremban–Gemas shuttle service for Seremban–Gemas stretch. It was operated by KTM Class 83 trains running the electrified double tracks at speeds up to 140 km/h (87 mph). Spanning over 100 km (62 mi), it served at Seremban, Senawang, Sungai Gadut, Rembau, Pulau Sebang/Tampin, Batang Melaka and ends at Gemas.

The service offered 59 services daily - 55 services between Seremban and Pulau Sebang and 4 services from Seremban to Gemas. Trains start at 5 am and ends at 11 pm, with a 30-minute frequency. Travel time from Seremban to Pulau Sebang was about 38 minutes while a trip from Seremban to Gemas took approximately 65 minutes.

The service had been operationally effective 10 October 2015 until 11 July 2016, when Seremban Line services to Pulau Sebang/Tampin replaced this shuttle. The shuttle was cut short to Pulau Sebang/Tampin on 20 June 2016; Batang Melaka and Gemas are no longer served by KTM Komuter.

=== KTM Komuter Trial Route ===
A new route for KTM Komuter services was introduced for the preparation of the infrastructure upgrading works in the Klang Valley Double Tracking project which began in April 2016. It aimed to increase the frequency and the smooth running of the KTM ETS, KTM Komuter, KTM Intercity & Freight at the Central Sector. The initial route for from Rawang-Seremban was changed to Batu Caves-Seremban effective 15 December 2015. The line was effectively named the Batu Caves–Pulau Sebang Line.

=== Additional Service for Early Birds (Bandar Tasik Selatan–KL Sentral-Tanjung Malim) ===
On 4 August 2016, an additional morning train (Mondays to Fridays except on public holidays) was introduced between Bandar Tasik Selatan, KL Sentral and Tanjung Malim. The train starts at Bandar Tasik Selatan at 5:35 am, running non-stop express to KL Sentral, arriving at 5:49 am. The train then leaves KL Sentral at 6:15 am and runs as a normal Port Klang Line train to Tanjung Malim, stopping at every station before terminating at Tanjung Malim at 7:44 am.

=== Service suspension between Putra and the old Kuala Lumpur station ===
From 22 December 2017, services on the line's three city-centre stations - Kuala Lumpur, Bank Negara and Putra were temporarily suspended due to track upgrading works, though the Port Klang Line continued to serve those stations. Trains only travelled between Tampin and KL Sentral, Batu Caves and Sentul.

Free shuttle buses, provided by Rapid KL, connected the Sentul Komuter station to the Sentul LRT station on the LRT Ampang and Sri Petaling Lines, and KL Sentral. Passengers from the Tampin–KL Sentral stretch could still reach downtown Kuala Lumpur via the LRT Kelana Jaya Line at KL Sentral, the LRT Sri Petaling Line at Bandar Tasik Selatan or the MRT Kajang Line at Kajang and Muzium Negara.

Services have since resumed to their original arrangements.

=== Service changes between Mid Valley, Pulau Sebang/Tampin, and Bandar Tasik Selatan ===
From 18 April 2026 until late December, no KTM Komuter services are available from 10 am to 4 pm on the Mid Valley to Pulau Sebang/Tampin and Pulau Sebang/Tampin to Bandar Tasik Selatan routes, in order to complete the second phase of the Klang Valley Double Track Project. For most of the day, they are being temporarily replaced by KTM ETS services. The remaining KTM Komuter services are reduced to five services during the morning (north, towards Batu Caves) and evening (south, towards Pulau Sebang) peak hours, at every 15 to 30 minutes.

== Rolling stock ==
The line uses KTM Class 92 trains in 6 car formations.

== Gallery ==
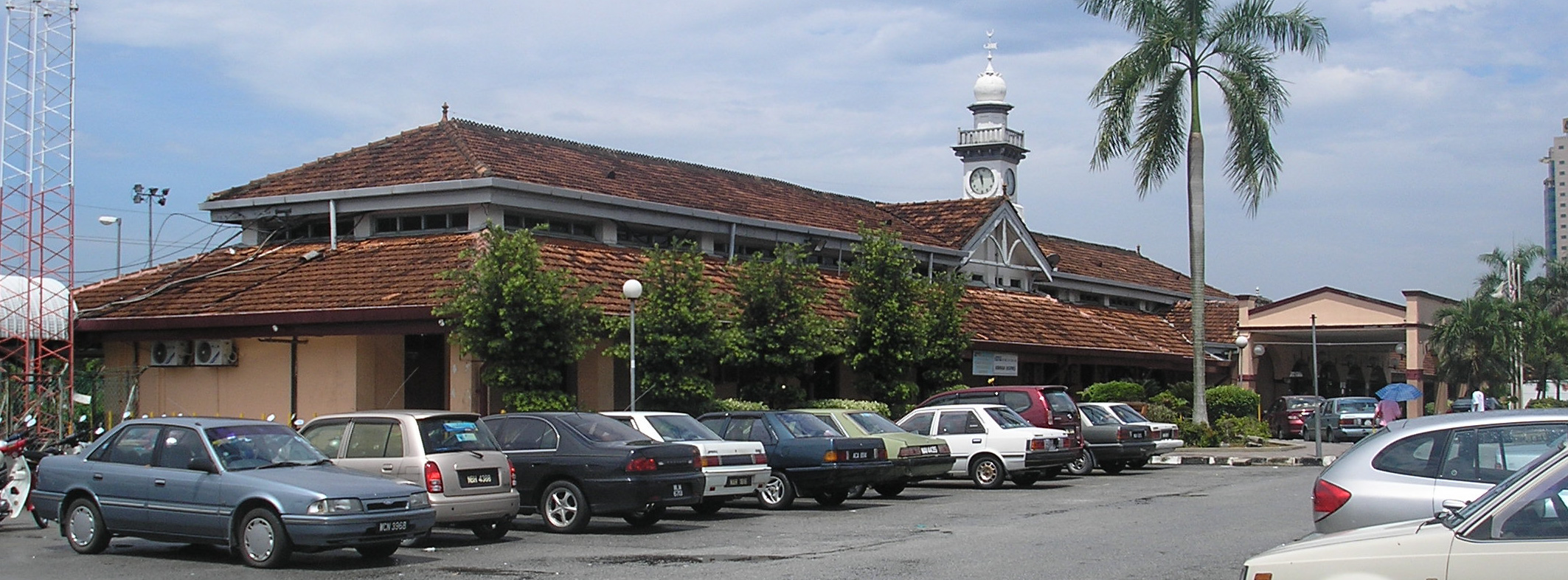
Seremban station

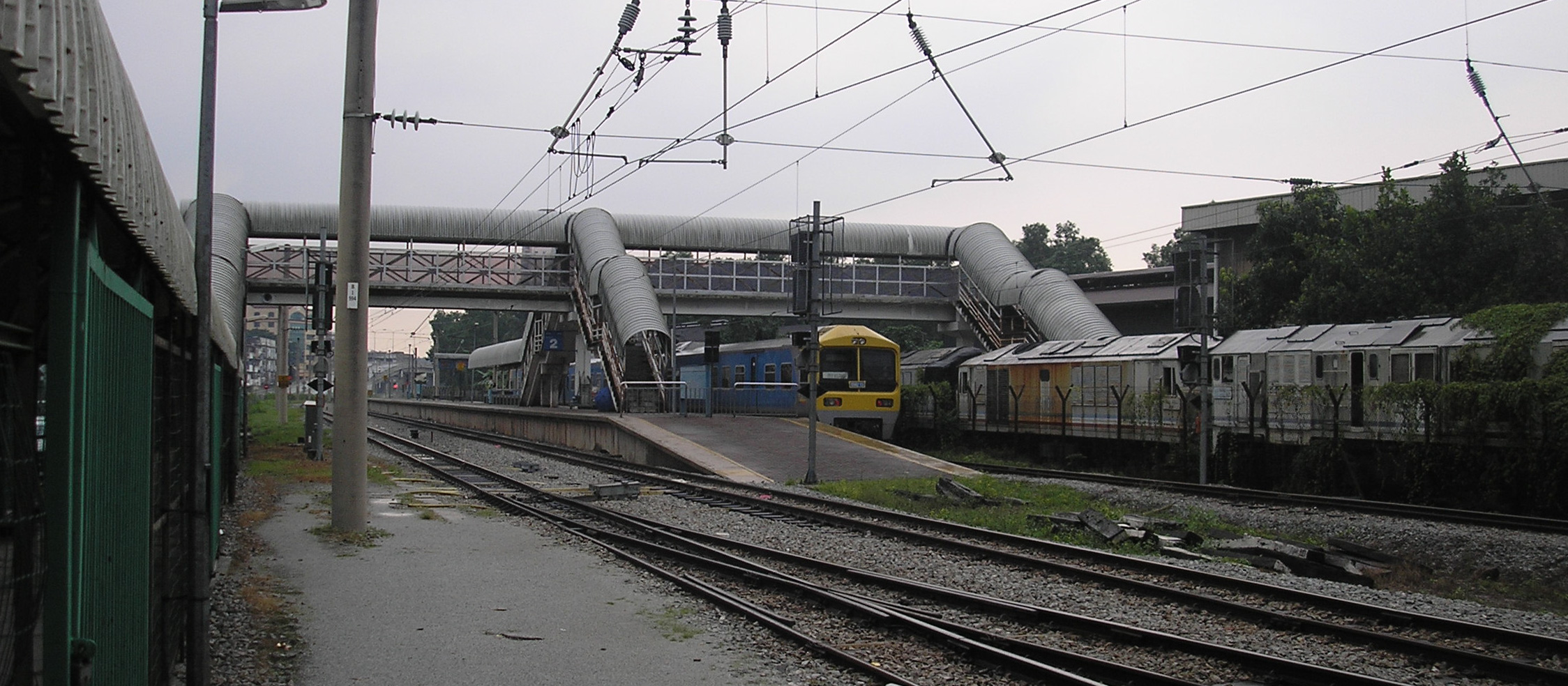
Sentul
A view of the 1995 island platform assigned for the old Sentul station in Sentul, Kuala Lumpur, Malaysia. This shot is taken towards the south. To the right is the old Sentul workshop.

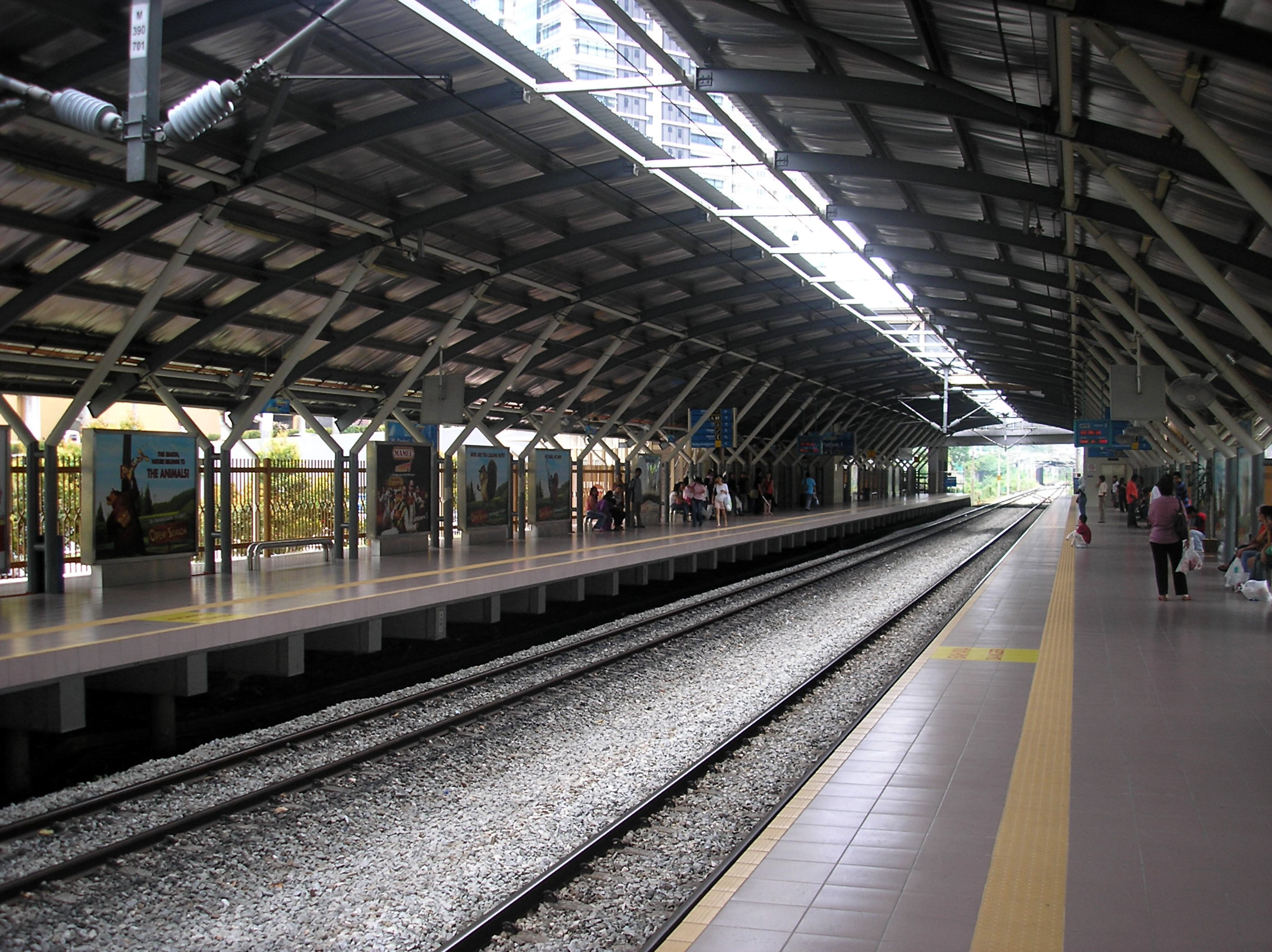
Mid Valley Station

Batu Caves Station
Current official northern terminus of Batu Caves–Pulau Sebang line since December 2015.

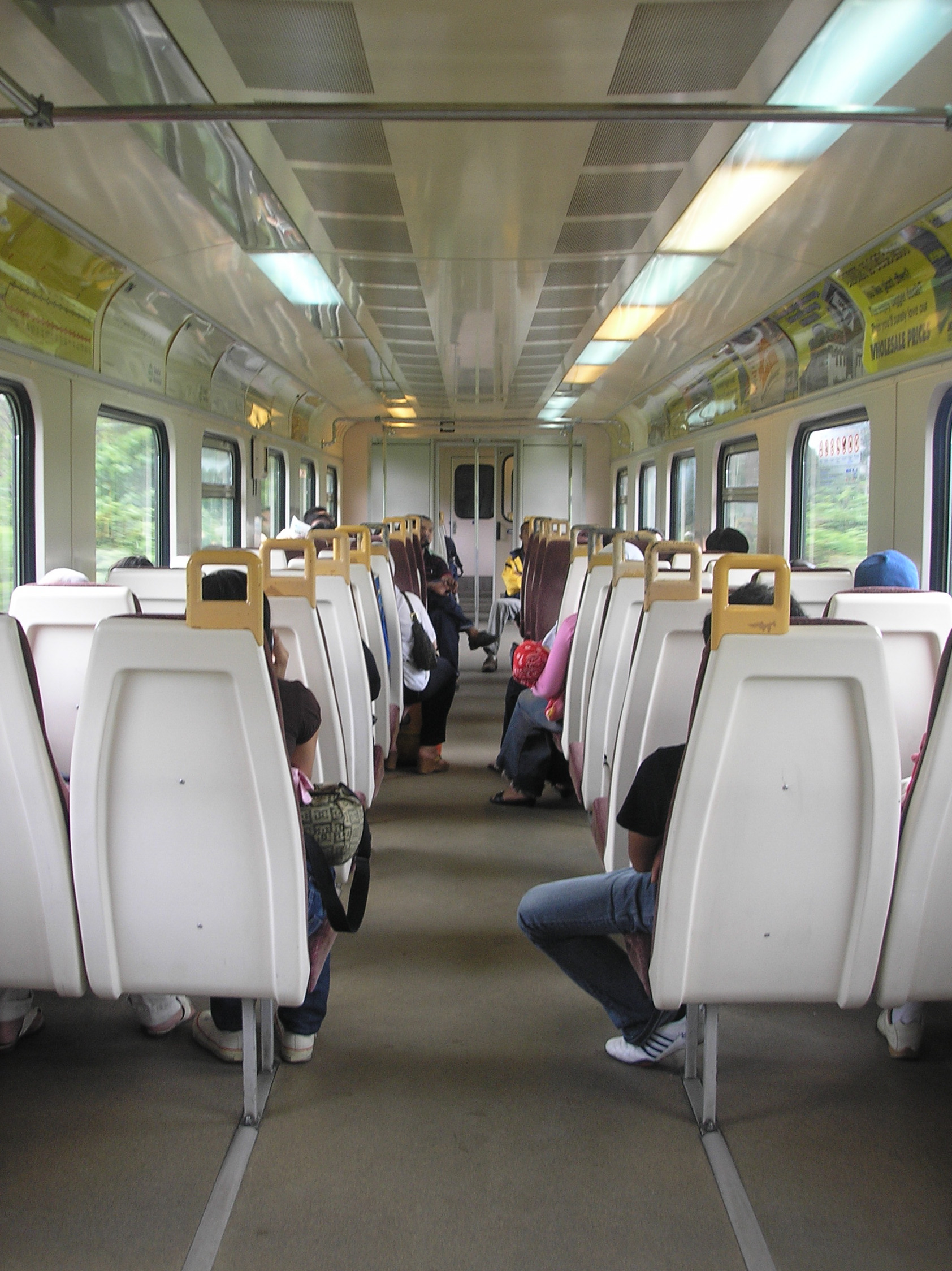
The (modified—with walls cut open and additional handle bars) interior of a KTM Class 81 EMU

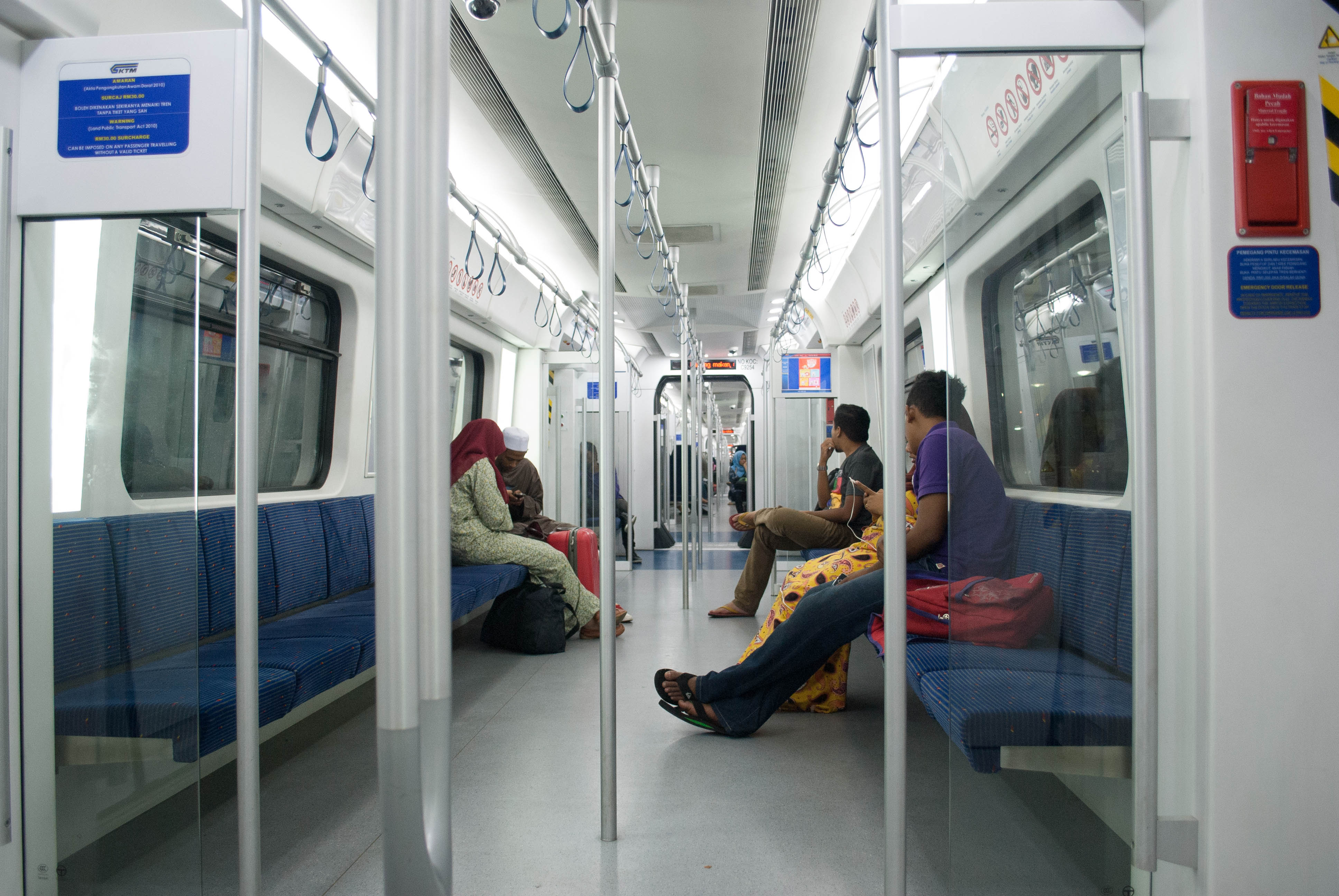
Interior of the KTM Class 92 EMU, end coaches feature longitudinal seating.

Kajang 2 station, the latest station addition of the Batu Caves–Pulau Sebang line

== See also ==
- Keretapi Tanah Melayu
  - KTM Intercity & KTM ETS
    - KTM West Coast Line
    - KTM East Coast Line
  - KTM Komuter
    - Batu Caves–Pulau Sebang Line
    - KL Sentral–Terminal Skypark Line
    - Northern Sector
    - Southern Sector
- Malaysian Railway System
