= Senawang Komuter station =

Railway station in Senawang, Malaysia

Senawang

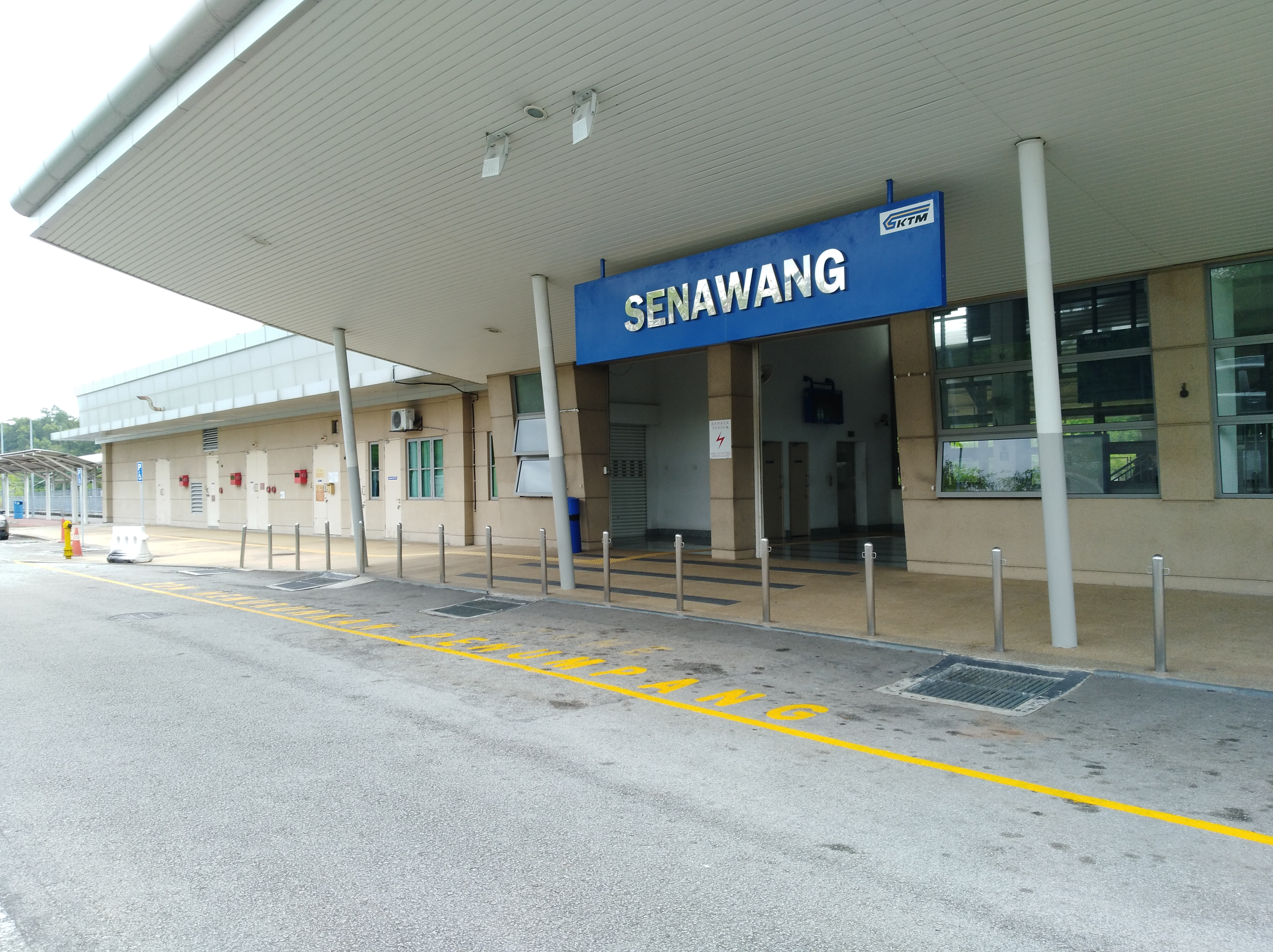

General information
- Other names: Malay: سناواڠ (Jawi); Chinese: 新那旺; Tamil: செனவாங்
- Location: Senawang, Negeri Sembilan, Malaysia.
- Coordinates: 2°41′21.1″N 101°58′20.1″E
- System: KB14 | Commuter rail station
- Owner: Railway Assets Corporation
- Operator: Keretapi Tanah Melayu
- Line: West Coast Line
- Platforms: 2 side platforms
- Tracks: 2

Construction
- Structure type: At-grade
- Parking: Available
- Accessible: Yes

Other information
- Station code: KB14

History
- Opened: 14 May 2011; 15 years ago
- Electrified: 2011

Services
| Preceding station | Keretapi Tanah Melayu (Komuter) | Following station |
|---|---|---|
| Seremban towards Batu Caves | Batu Caves–Pulau Sebang Line | Sungai Gadut towards Pulau Sebang/Tampin |
Route map
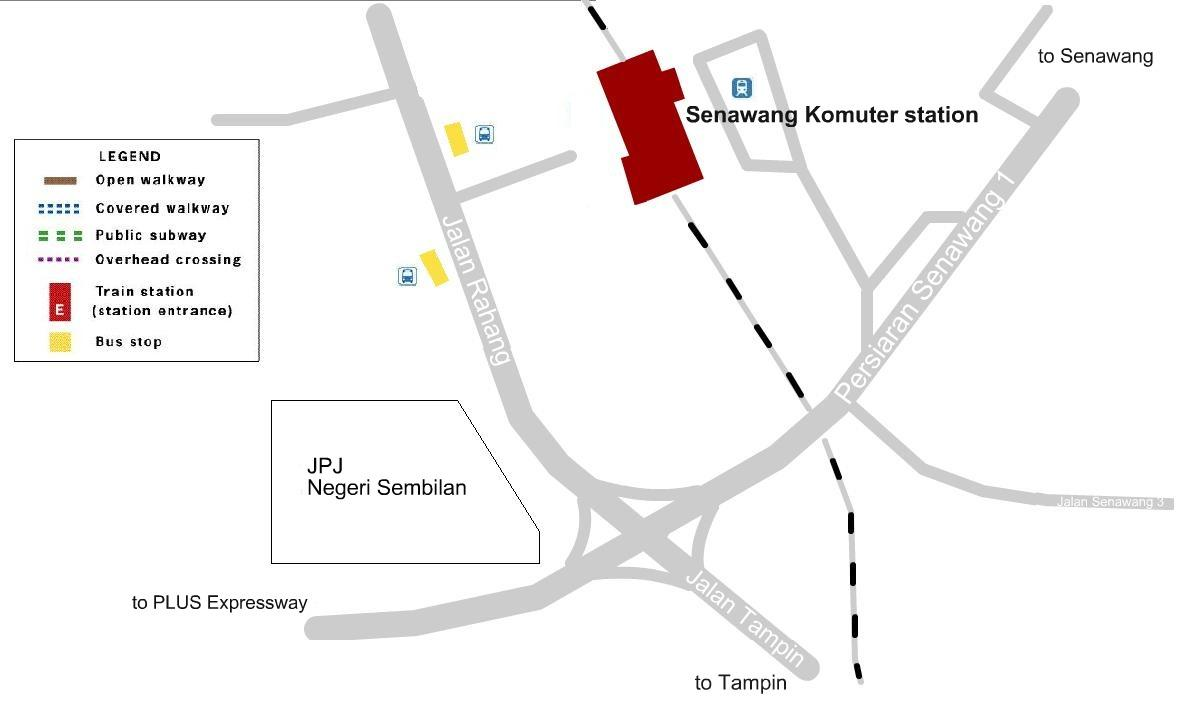
Location

The Senawang Komuter station, is a Malaysian commuter rail station serving as a halt on the KTM Komuter Seremban Line. It was constructed as part of the double tracking and electrification project between Seremban and Gemas, undertaken by IRCON International, a subsidiary of Indian Railways. The station began revenue service on 14 May 2011.

== Location ==
The station serves Senawang and is the closest station to some of Seremban's outer suburbs such as Paroi, Rahang, Forest Heights and Taman Seremban Jaya down south. The station is located near the three-way intersection of the North South Expressway's Senawang Exit, the Federal Route 1 and Persiaran Senawang 1.
