= Era Baru =

Era Baru Sdn Bhd
- Era Baru Group
- Company type: Private Limited Company
- Industry: Real estate development and investment
- Founded: 8 September 1981
- Headquarters: Seremban, Negeri Sembilan, Malaysia
- Key people: Dato' Chua Tiong Moon, Loo Way Men, Chua Ah Nye, Ho Shau Kian, Lee Meow Soon
- Products: Real estate
- Parent: Grand Linage Sdn Bhd
- Website: http://www.erabarugroup.com

Era Baru Sdn Bhd is a Malaysian property development and investment holding company based in Seremban, Negeri Sembilan in Malaysia. The company was incorporated on 8 September 1981 under the umbrella of Grand Linage Sdn Bhd. Since its incorporation, Era Baru together with its parent company and other subsidiaries have successfully completed more than 4,000 units of residential and commercial properties within Negeri Sembilan, with total sales revenue of more than RM146 million.

== Company Activities ==
=== Completed residential and industrial projects ===
- Taman Indah, Seremban
- Taman Bukit Markisa, Seremban
- Taman Ampangan, Seremban
- Taman Jemapoh, Kuala Pilah
- Taman Ulu Bendol, Kuala Pilah
- Taman Sri Terachi, Kuala Pilah
- Taman Sri Mawar, Senawang
- Taman Seri Pagi, Senawang
- Taman Desa Dahlia, Senawang
- Sri Senawang Light Industrial Centre, Senawang
- Bukit Sri Senawang, Sungai Gadut
- Taman Serting Utama, Jempol
- Pusat Perniagaan Jempol (Phase 1 & 2), Jempol
- Taman Awana Indah, Bahau
- Taman Tasik Bahau
- Taman Temerloh Indah (Phase 1), Temerloh, Pahang

=== Completed leisure and entertainment projects ===
- Era Square, an 28-acre (110,000 m^{2}) integrated development project consisting of commercial, leisure, shopping and bus terminal services in Seremban
- Era Hotel Bahau, the first 2-star hotel with dining, health care, entertainment and conference facilities in Bahau
- Era Golf & Country Resort, the first 18-hole golf course with full facilities including a Club House in Bahau

=== Completed properties designed for investment ===
Certain properties developed by the Group are held for investment purposes such as:

- A 4-storey shopping complex with a basement car park in Seremban Town, currently rented out to The Store (Seremban) Sdn Bhd
- A 4-storey shopping complex with a basement car park in Bahau Town, currently rented out to Hi Way Cash & Carry Sdn Bhd
- A single-storey restaurant at Era Square, currently rented out to Min Kok Restaurant Sdn Bhd

=== Under development ===
- Taman Ampangan, Seremban (Final phase)
- Pusat Perniagaan Jempol Jempol (Shopping Centre & Phase 3 onwards)
- Era Square, Seremban (Phase 2 onwards)

== Gallery ==
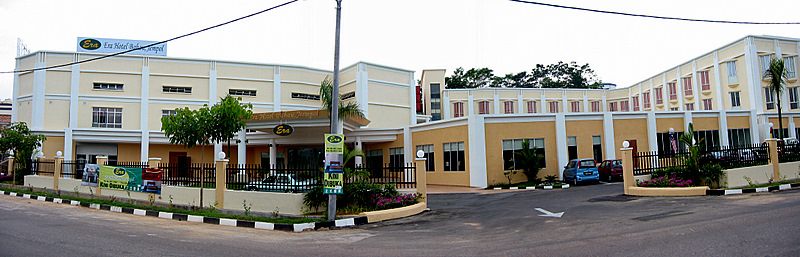
Era Hotel Bahau - overview

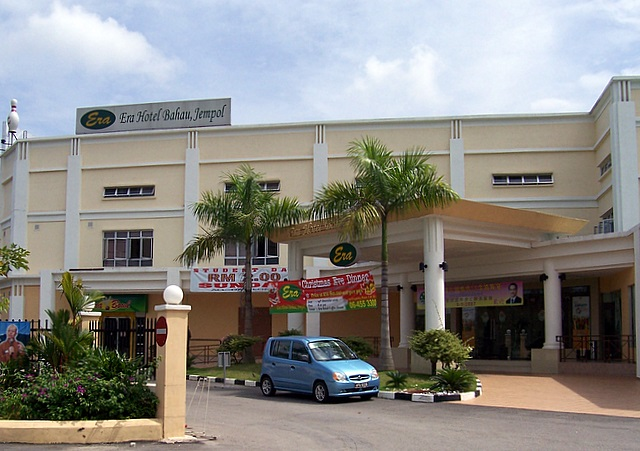
Era Hotel Bahau - main entrance

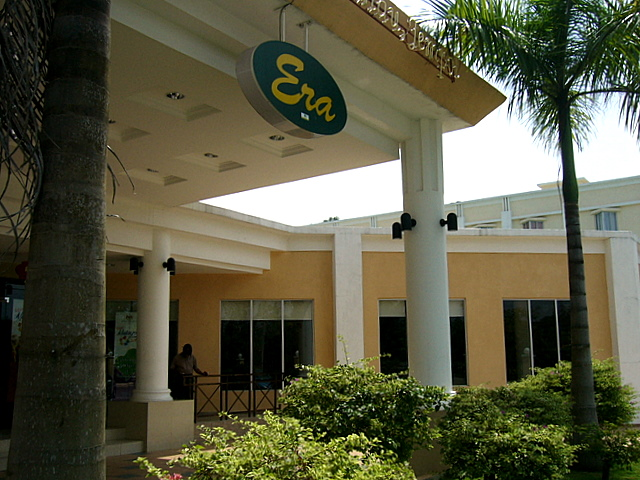
Era Hotel Bahau - courtyard

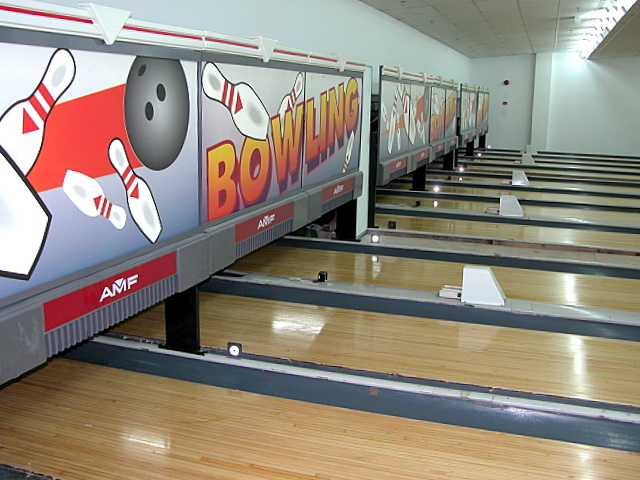
Era Hotel Bahau - bowling alley

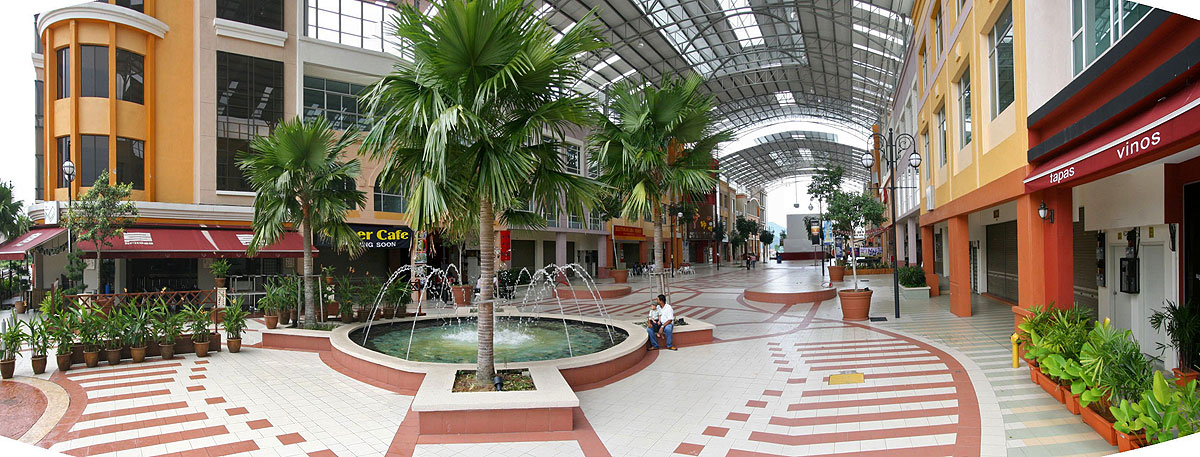
Era Square - one end of Era Walk

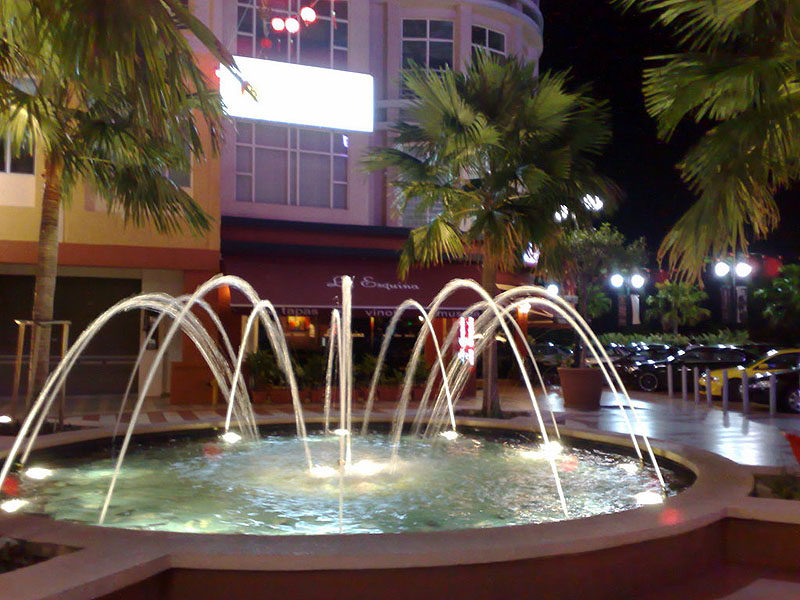
Era Square - a water fountain

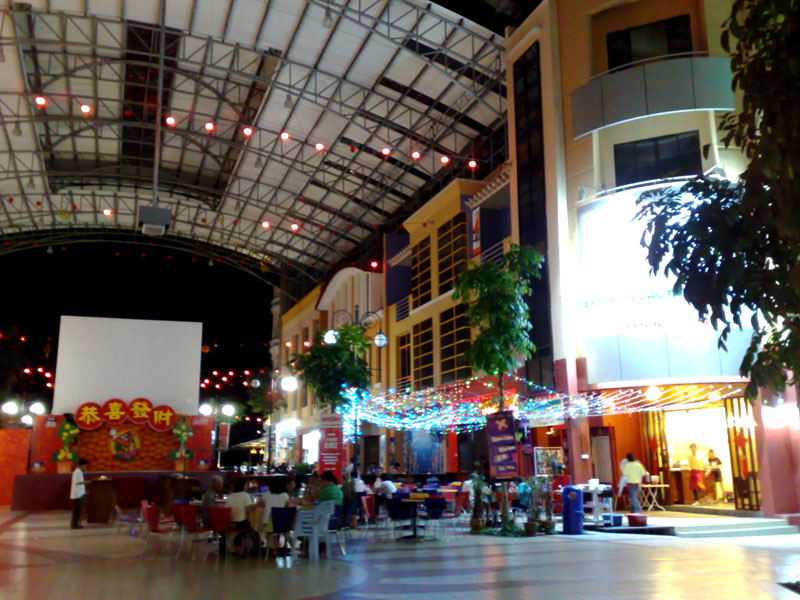
Era Square - central stage

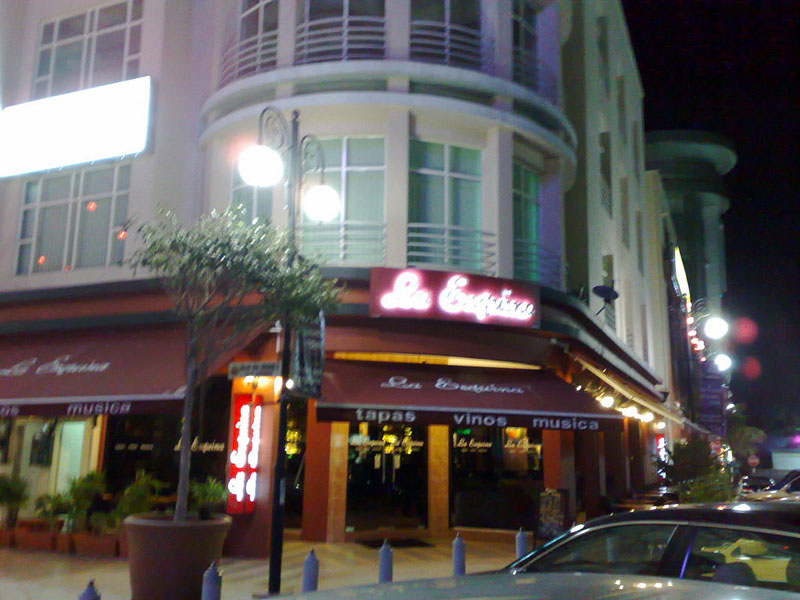
Era Square - a Spanish-theme restaurant
