= Senawang–NSE Road =

Road in Malaysia

Federal Route 243
- Senawang-NSE Road

Route information
- Maintained by Malaysian Public Works Department
- Length: 0.70 km (0.43 mi; 2,300 ft)

Major junctions
- East end: Senawang
- FT 1 Federal Route 1 North–South Expressway Southern Route / AH2
- West end: Senawang interchange North–South Expressway Southern Route / AH2

Location
- Country: Malaysia

Highway system
- Highways in Malaysia; Expressways; Federal; State

Senawang-NSE Road, Federal Route 243, is a dual-carriageway federal road in Seremban, Negeri Sembilan, Malaysia. It is a main route to North–South Expressway Southern Route from Senawang.

It starts at Senawang interchange of the North–South Expressway Southern Route and ends at Senawang.

== History ==
The section between Senawang-NSE interchange and Senawang-Federal Route 1 interchange used to be a part of the Kuala Lumpur–Seremban Expressway before being decommissioned to a federal road after the expressway which formed the North–South Expressway Southern Route was extended southwards. In 2012, this section was gazetted as a Federal Route 243.

== Features ==
At most sections, the Federal Route 243 was built under the JKR U4 road standard, with a speed limit of 70 km/h (43 mph).

== Junction lists ==
The entire route is located in Seremban District, Negeri Sembilan.

Legend:

- I/C - Interchange, I/S - Intersection, RSA - Rest and service area, OBR - Overhead bridge restaurant, R/R - Restaurant and rest plaza, L/B - Layby, V/P - Vista point, TN - tunnel, T/P - Toll plaza, BR - Bridge
- C - Cloverleaf, S - Stack, T-A - Trumpet-A, T-B - Trumpet-B, DT - Directional-T/Y, SDT - Semi-Directional-T/Y, P-Y - Partial-Y, D - Diamond, P-C - Partial cloverleaf, D-D - Diverging diamond, D-R - Direct ramp

Location	km	mi	Exit	Name	Destinations	Notes
Senawang				Senawang; Senawang I/C	FT 1 Malaysia Federal Route 1 – Seremban, Rembau, Tampin; FT 97 Malaysia Federal Route 97 – Paroi; FT 242 Malaysia Federal Route 242 Senawang, Kuala Pilah, Kuala Lumpur, Kajang, Semenyih	Diamond interchange
Senawang				Taman Seremban Jaya I/S	Jalan Seremban Jaya – Taman Seremban Jaya, Taman Senangin, Lotus Seremban Jaya	3-way intersection
Senawang			Shell L/B (westbound)			
Senawang			Senawang Toll Plaza			
Senawang			220	Senawang-NSE I/C	North–South Expressway Southern Route / AH2 – Kuala Lumpur, Kuala Lumpur International Airport (KLIA), Port Dickson, Pedas/Linggi, Malacca, Johor Bahru	Trumpet interchange
1.000 mi = 1.609 km; 1.000 km = 0.621 mi: Electronic toll collection
