= Taman Seremban Jaya =

Coordinates: 2°41′N 101°58′E

Taman Seremban Jaya (Jawi: تامن سرمبن جاي; Tamil Chinese: 龙城) is a suburb of Seremban, near Senawang in Negeri Sembilan, Malaysia. It is located about 5 kilometres from Seremban city centre. It is served by the Senawang Komuter station, but it is also not far from the Sungai Gadut station.
