= Sungai Gadut =

Town in Malaysia

- Suburb of Seremban
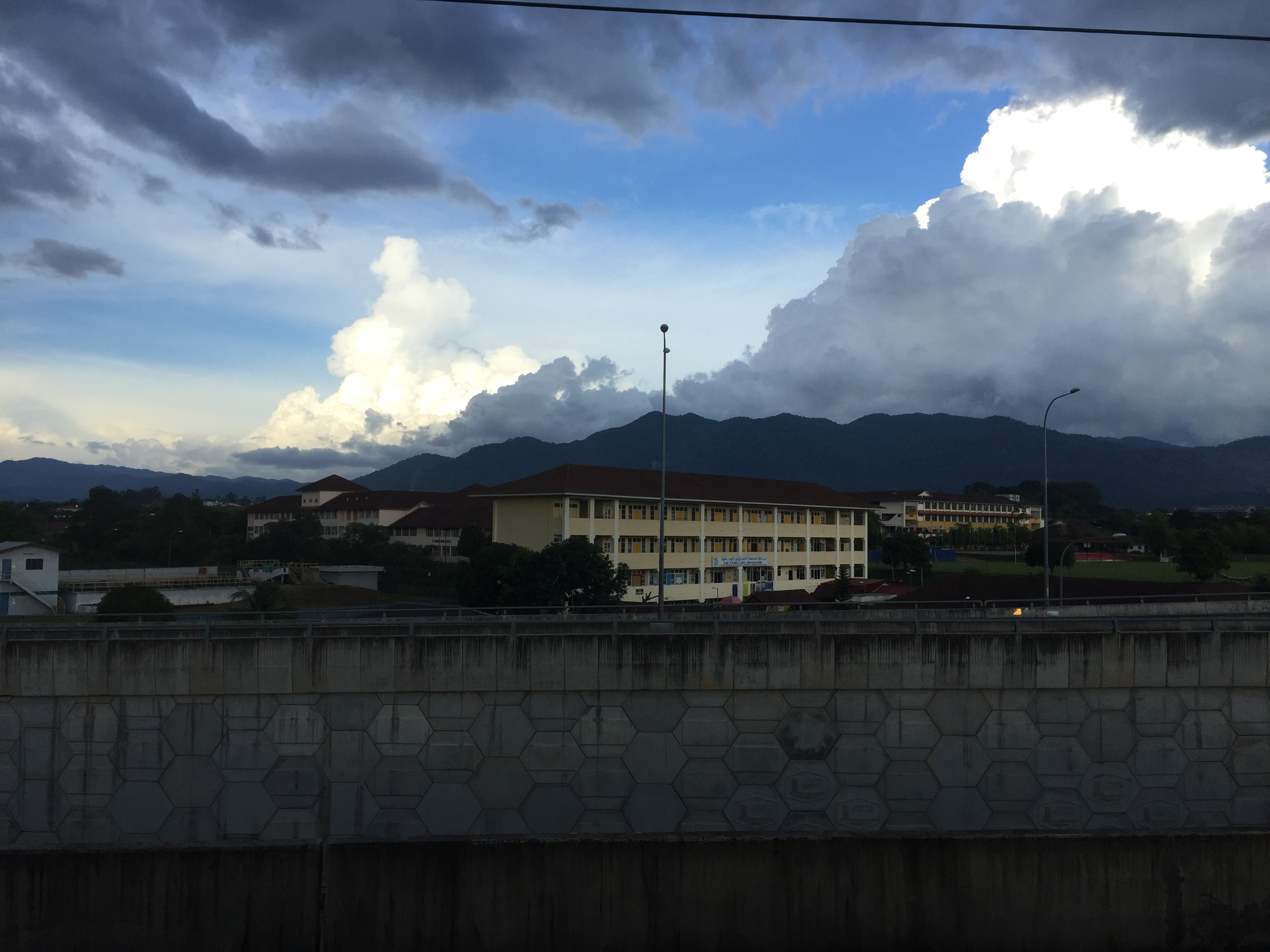
- View of Sungai Gadut and Mount Angsi from the KTMB station.

- Location of Sungai Gadut Sungai Gadut (Peninsular Malaysia) Sungai Gadut (Malaysia)
- Country: Malaysia
- State: Negeri Sembilan
- District: Seremban
- Luak: Sungai Ujong

Government
  - Body: Seremban City Council
  - Mayor: Masri Baharuddin
  - MP: Mohamad Hasan (BN–UMNO)
  - MLA: Kamarol Ridzuan Mohd Zain (PN–PAS)
- Time zone: UTC+8 (MST)
- Postcode: 70400

Sungai Gadut in Seremban District

Sungai Gadut is a small town in Seremban District, Negeri Sembilan, Malaysia, near Senawang. The place is surrounded by many smaller towns including Taman Tuanku Jaafar, Bandar Seremban Selatan, Taman Pinggiran Senawang, Taman Senawang Perdana, Ladang Seremban, Kg. Ulu Rantau, and Taman Sri Pertama.

== Politics ==
Sungai Gadut is part of the state legislative assembly constituency (DUN) of Paroi and the parliamentary constituency of Rembau.

== Infrastructure ==
=== Education ===
The community contains one primary school and two secondary schools. There are several notable schools located in the city which have existed for more than a decade, such as, SMK Tuanku Jaafar is located Taman Tuanku Jaafar, SJK(T) Ladang Seremban is located in front of Taman Pinggiran Senawang, and Sekolah Dato' Abdul Razak (SDAR) campus is located Ladang Seremban between Jalan Rantau-Sungai Gadut (Negeri Sembilan State Route N5).

=== Transportation ===
==== By road ====
Malaysia's oldest north–south road, Federal Route FT 1, passes through Sungai Gadut. It is also the eastern end of the Negeri Sembilan State Route N5, which links the town to Rantau.

==== By rail ====
The Batu Caves–Pulau Sebang Line serves Sungai Gadut at the Sungai Gadut station. The station opened in 2011 when it extended here. The line eventually extended to Pulau Sebang and Gemas in 2015 along with the ETS service.
