= Rembau railway station =

Railway station in Rembau, Malaysia

Rembau

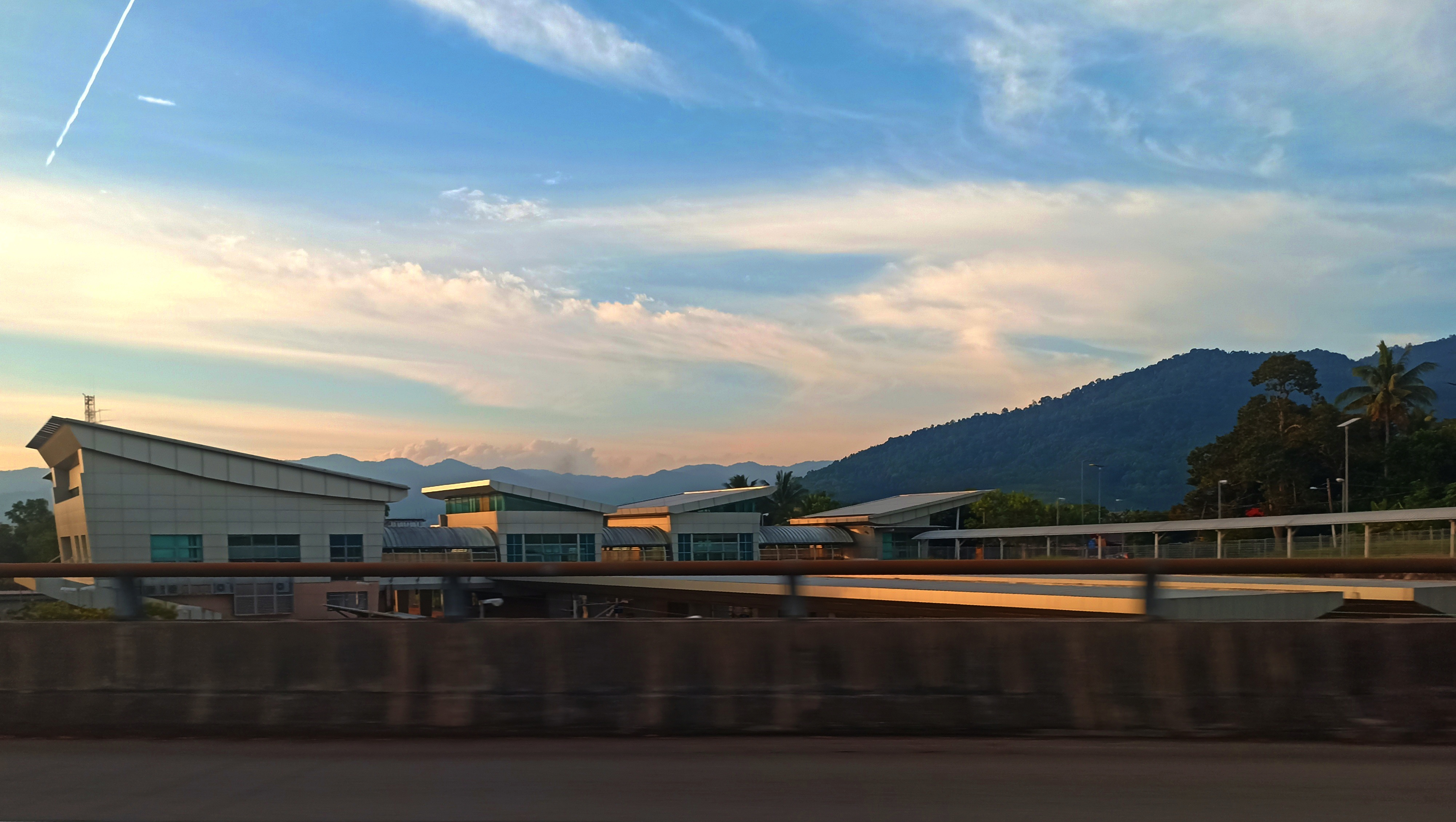
- Main building of the station

General information
- Other names: Malay: رمباو (Jawi); Chinese: 林茂; Tamil: ரெம்பாவ்
- Location: Rembau, Negeri Sembilan, Malaysia
- Coordinates: 2°35′35″N 102°5′40.7″E
- System: KB16 | Commuter rail station
- Owner: Railway Assets Corporation
- Operator: Keretapi Tanah Melayu
- Line: West Coast Line
- Platforms: 2 side platforms
- Tracks: 4

Construction
- Parking: Available, free.
- Accessible: Yes

Other information
- Station code: KB16

History
- Electrified: 2013

Services
Preceding station	Keretapi Tanah Melayu (Komuter)	Following station
Sungai Gadut towards Batu Caves	Batu Caves–Pulau Sebang Line	Pulau Sebang/Tampin Terminus
Location

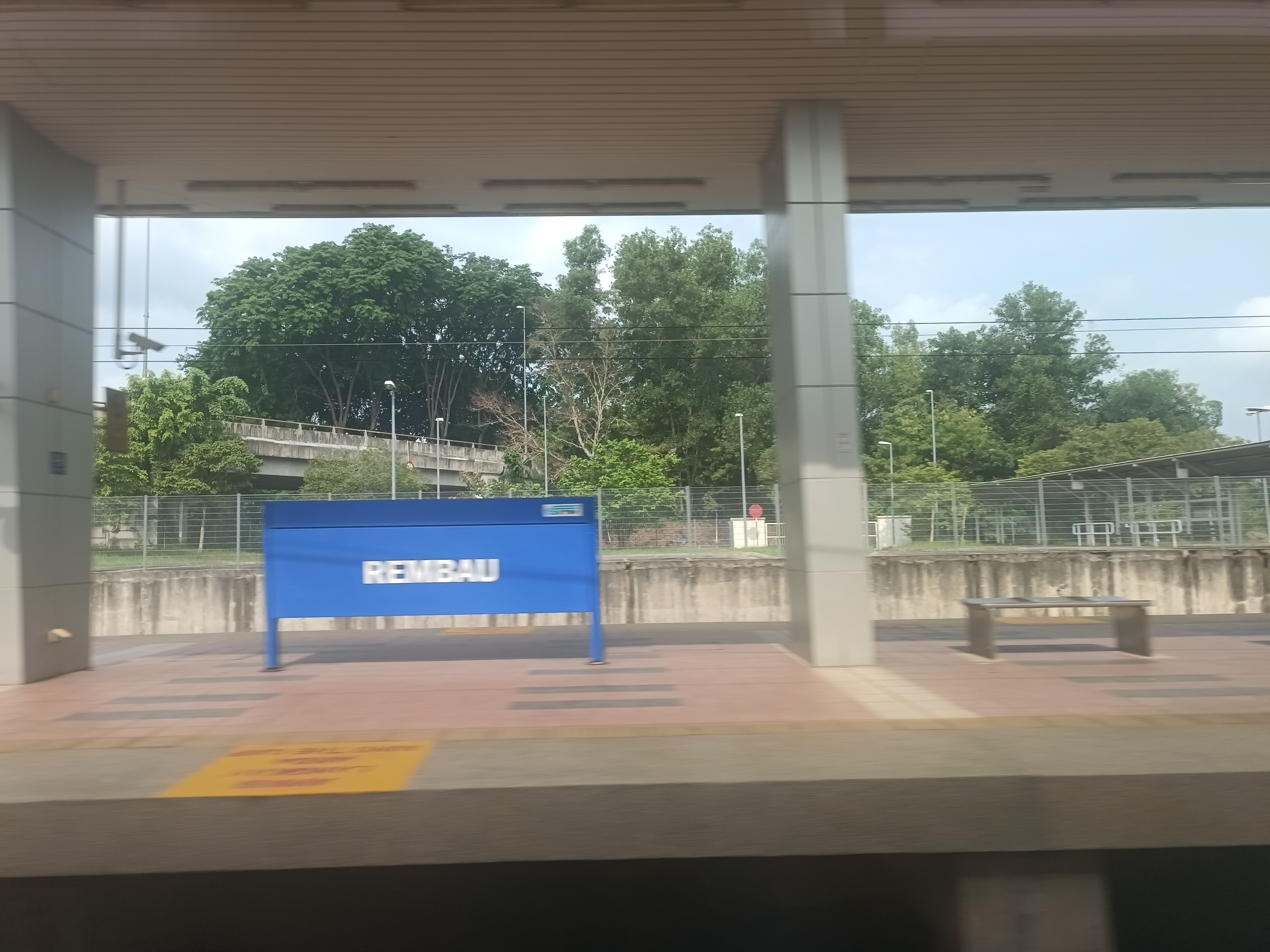
Signboard and platform

The Rembau railway station is a Malaysian train station on the West Coast Line, located at and named after the town of Rembau, Negeri Sembilan.

The station was upgraded under the Seremban–Gemas Electrified Double Tracking Project.

The station is served by the KTM Komuter Seremban Line. Previously, it was served by KTM Intercity and ETS trains. It was for a short while, the southern terminus of the Rawang–Seremban line for selected peak hour trains with three departures during morning peak, and three arrivals during evening peak daily, with most trains terminating at Sungai Gadut instead the arrangement ended when Komuter services were extended to Pulau Sebang/Tampin in 2015 as part of a shuttle service from Seremban. The shuttle ended in 2016 with most trains either terminating at Sungai Gadut or Tampin. It was also at this time where ETS services were withdrawn.
