= Sungai Gadut Komuter station =

Railway station in Sungai Gadut, Malaysia

Sungai Gadut

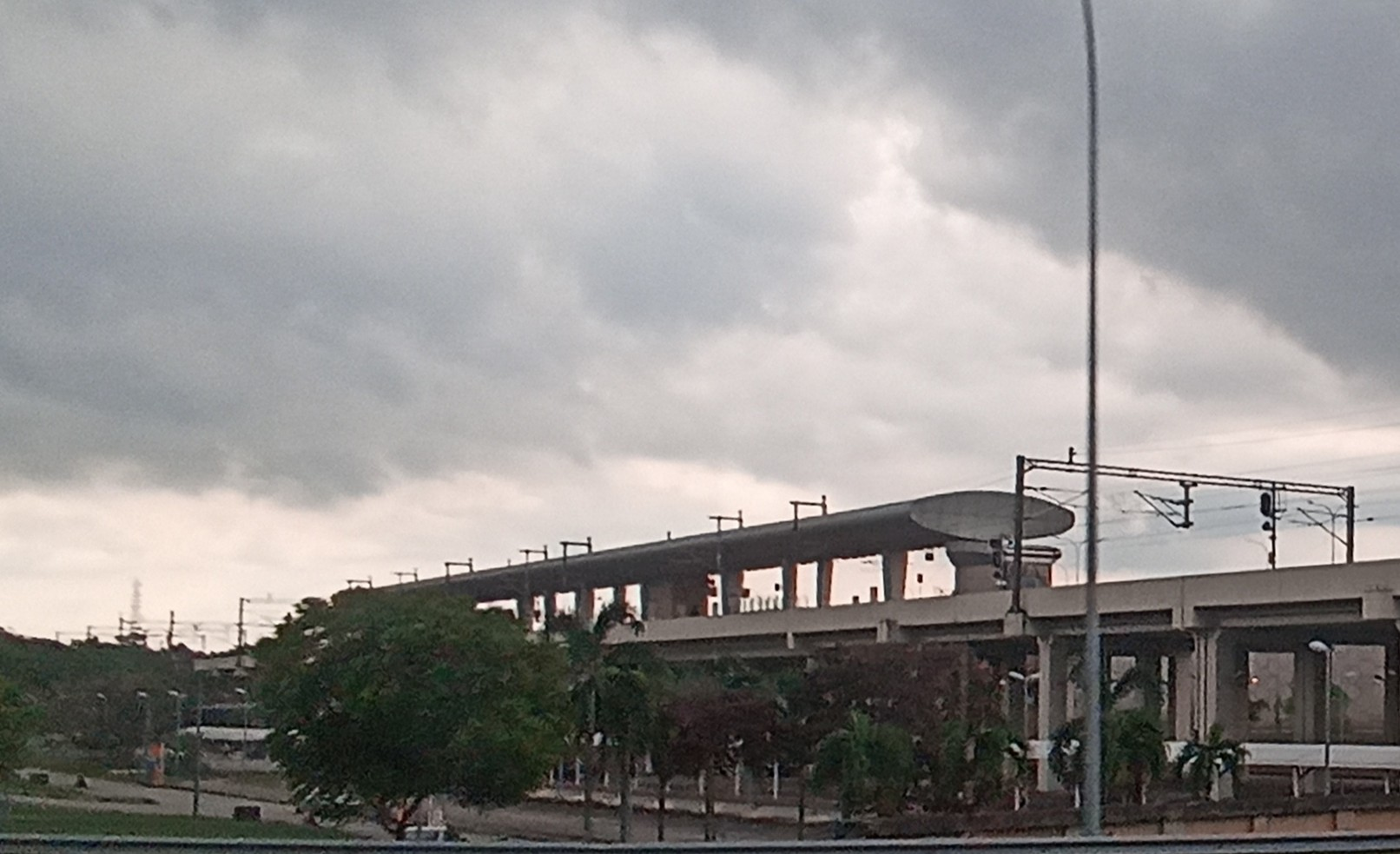

General information
- Other names: Malay: سوڠاي ݢادوت (Jawi); Chinese: 双溪芽笃; Tamil: சுங்கை காடுட்
- Location: Sungai Gadut, Seremban District, Negeri Sembilan, Malaysia.
- Coordinates: 2°39′38.6″N 101°59′44.8″E
- System: KB15 | Commuter rail station
- Owner: Railway Assets Corporation
- Operator: Keretapi Tanah Melayu
- Line: West Coast Line
- Platforms: 1 island platform
- Tracks: 3

Construction
- Structure type: Elevated
- Parking: Available
- Accessible: Yes

Other information
- Station code: KB15

History
- Opened: 14 May 2011; 15 years ago
- Electrified: 2011

Services
Preceding station	Keretapi Tanah Melayu (Komuter)	Following station
Senawang towards Batu Caves	Batu Caves–Pulau Sebang Line	Rembau towards Pulau Sebang/Tampin
Location

Sungai Gadut Komuter station is a train station in Sungai Gadut, Senawang, Negeri Sembilan, Malaysia. The station is served by the KTM Komuter's Batu Caves–Pulau Sebang Line, part of the larger Klang Valley Integrated Transit System.

== History ==
Sungai Gadut station was built as a result of the double track electrification to Gemas. Initially, the Seremban line was only extended to here in 2011. Rembau was brought to the line in 2012 even though most trains terminated here. The KTM line extended to Tampin and Gemas in 2015 but as part of a shuttle service from Seremban. As the service to Gemas was cut back to Tampin in 2016, the shuttle service was dissolved and now trains from Kuala Lumpur will go to Sungai Gadut and Tampin. Many trains still terminate here (mostly in the off-peak).

== Layout ==
Contrary to most KTM Komuter stations where the tracks and platforms are at ground level, Sungai Gadut station is elevated. This, as well as Terminal Skypark station on the KL Sentral–Terminal Skypark Line, are the only 2 elevated stations in the entire KTM Komuter system currently, with other elevated stations being Segamat, Kluang and Renggam as part of the Gemas-Johor Bahru Electrification and Double Tracking Project (EDTP) on the West Coast Line as a whole.

== Location ==
The station is located in Sungai Gadut, an offshoot suburb of the Seremban metropolitan area. The station also serves Taman Seremban Jaya, Bandar Seremban Selatan, and the southern parts of Senawang. The station is located right next to Jalan Seremban-Tampin (Malaysia Federal Route 1) and this station is also located on the Negeri Sembilan state route N5 which connects Sungai Gadut to Rantau and Linggi.

== See also ==
- Rail transport in Malaysia
