= Forest Heights, Seremban =

Forest Heights
- Suburb of Seremban
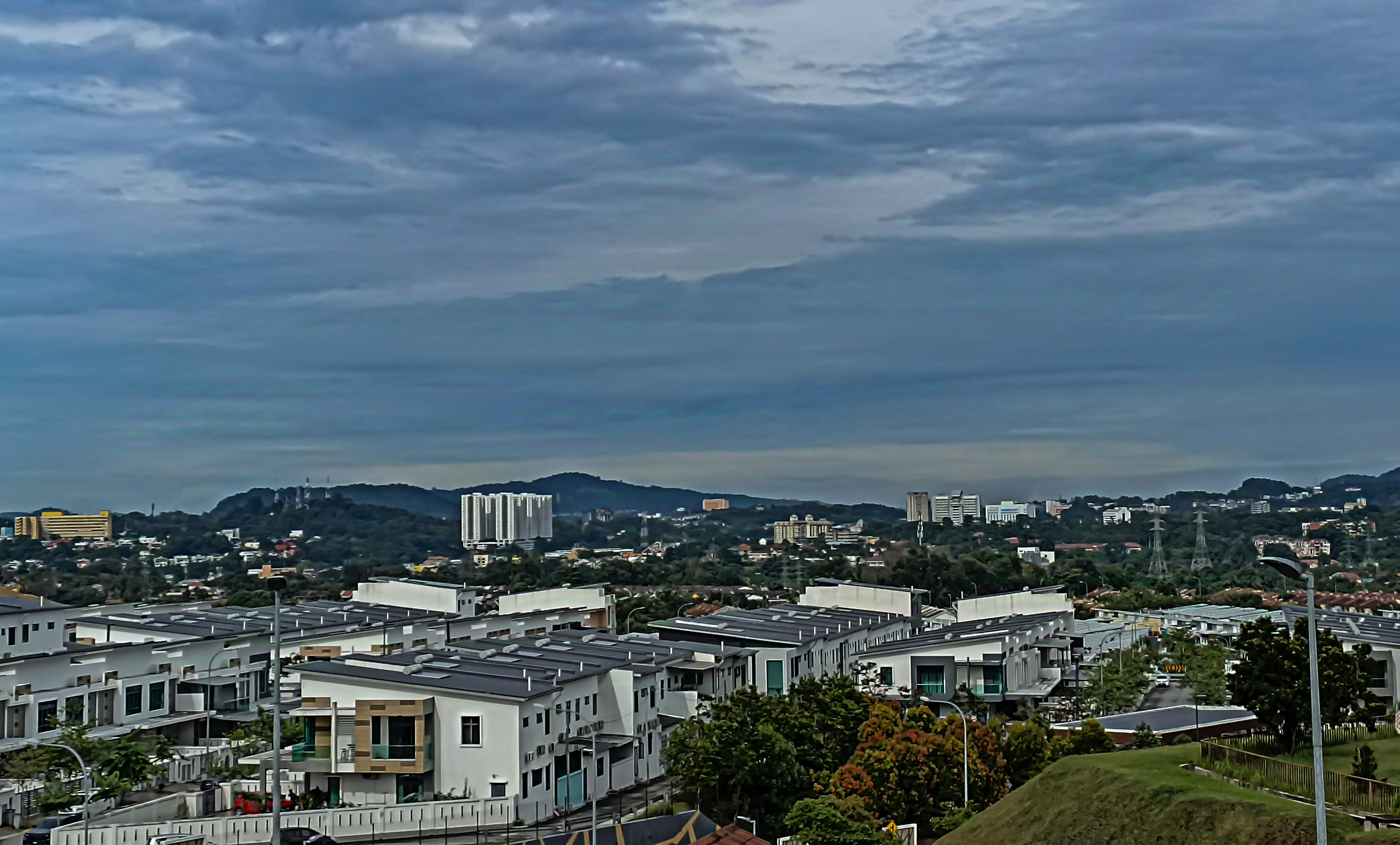
- A residential area in Forest Heights, overlooking downtown Seremban
- Country: Malaysia
- State: Negeri Sembilan
- District: Seremban
- Luak: Sungai Ujong

Government
  - Type: Local government
  - Body: Seremban City Council
  - Mayor: Masri Baharuddin
  - MP: Cha Kee Chin (PH–DAP)
  - MLA: Mugunthan Subramaniam (PH–DAP)
- Time zone: UTC+8 (Malaysia Standard Time)
  - Summer (DST): Not applicable
- Postcode: 70450
- Website: https://forestheights.com.my/

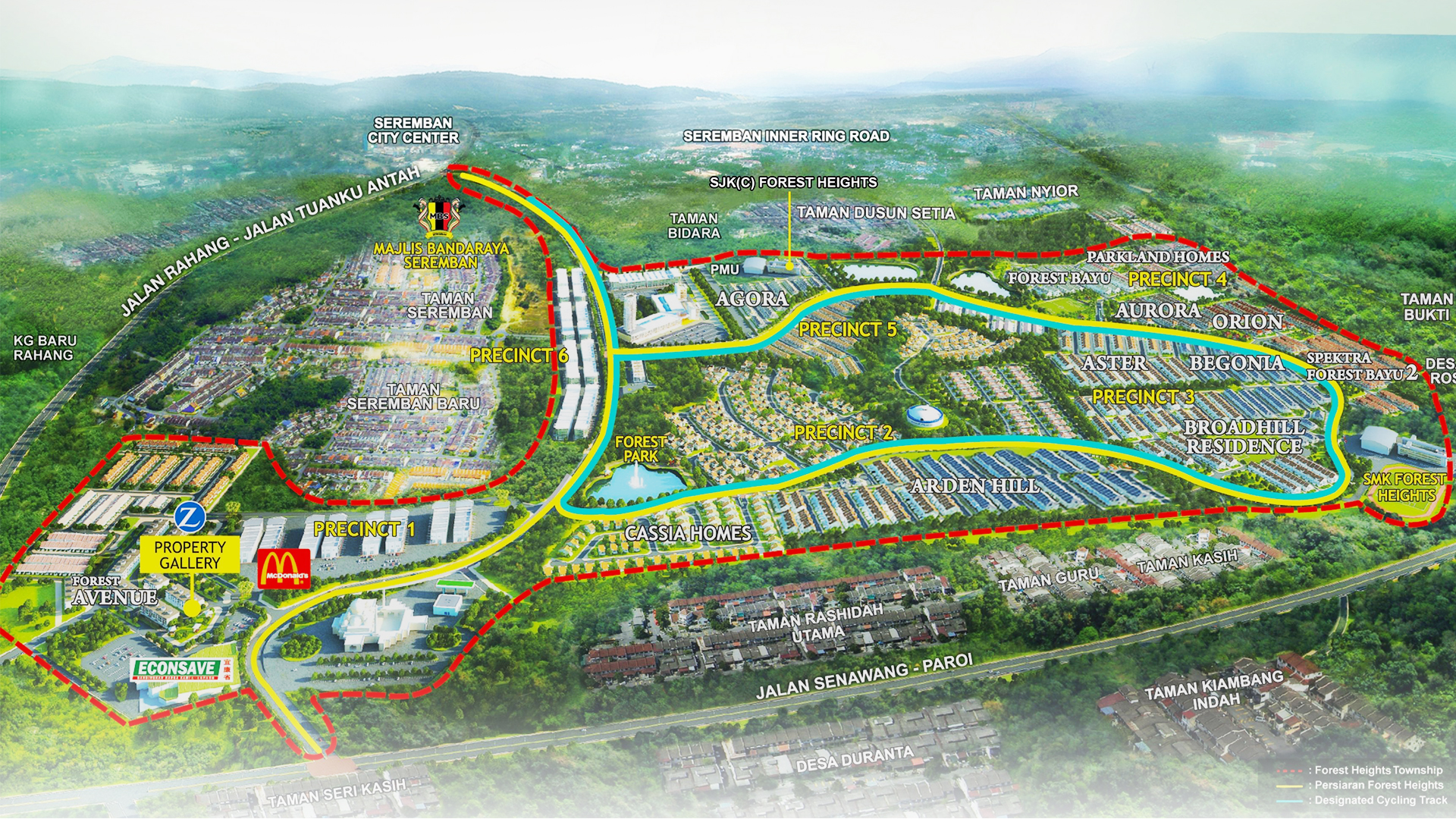
Forest Heights masterplan

Forest Heights is a 488-acre planned township situated between Rahang and Senawang, Seremban, Negeri Sembilan, Malaysia. It is developed by Sunrise MCL Land Sdn. Bhd., formed through a joint venture between UEM Sunrise Berhad, the property arm of UEM Group, and Malaysian–Singaporean property developer Sunway MCL.

Situated within the Malaysia Vision Valley corridor, the township consists mainly of residential suites, office complexes and free industry zone development. Nearby retail centres include Econsave, Giant, Lotus's and Mydin. The headquarters of the Seremban City Council is located here.

Forest Heights is a 15-minute drive to either Senawang or downtown Seremban and 3 km from both North–South Expressway Southern Route and the Seremban–Port Dickson Highway.

== Projects ==
Among the projects launched for sales are:

- Parkland Homes – which include two phrases of residential homes.
- Cassia Homes – Bungalow units
- Broadhill - 2 & 3 storey landed house (developed above sea level 324 feet)
- Seremban Business Park
- New SJK (C) moved from Ulu Kanchong
- New Sekolah Menengah Kebangsaan Taman Forest Heights
- New Project - Arden Hill @ Precinct 2 - 2 storey landed house (located above sea level 364 feet)

== Adjacent neighbourhoods ==
- Taman Bukti
- Taman Desa Ros
- Taman Dusun Setia
- Taman Guru Melayu
- Taman Kian Kee
- Taman Nyior
- Taman Rashidah Utama
- Taman Seremban
- Taman Seri Kasih
- Taman Seri Mawar
