= Malaysia Federal Route 97 =

Road in Malaysia

Federal Route 97
- Jalan Senawang–Paroi

Route information
- Maintained by Malaysian Public Works Department
- Length: 4.59 km (2.85 mi)

Major junctions
- North end: Paroi
- FT 51 Federal Route 51; FT 242 Federal Route 242; FT 1 Federal Route 1 FT 243 Senawang-NSE Road
- South end: Senawang

Location
- Country: Malaysia

Highway system
- Highways in Malaysia; Expressways; Federal; State

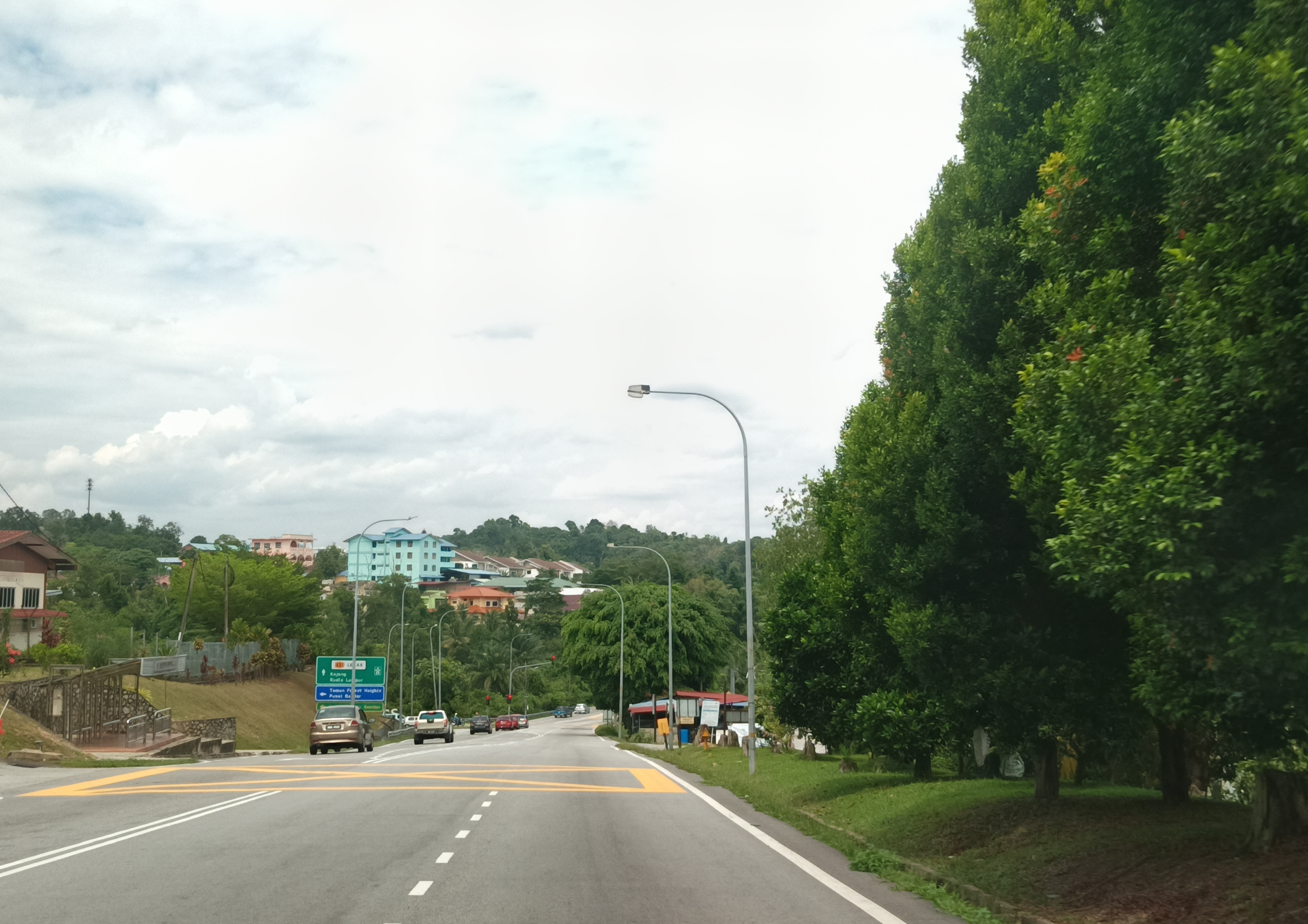
FT97 near its southern end. Taman Rashidah Utama is in the background.

Federal Route 97, Jalan Senawang–Paroi, is a federal road in Seremban, Negeri Sembilan, Malaysia. It starts at Paroi and ends at Senawang.

At most sections, the Federal Route 97 was built under the JKR U4 road standard, allowing maximum speed limit of up to 70 km/h.

== Junction lists ==
The entire route is located in Seremban District, Negeri Sembilan.

Legend:

- I/C - Interchange, I/S - Intersection, RSA - Rest and service area, OBR - Overhead bridge restaurant, R/R - Restaurant and rest plaza, L/B - Layby, V/P - Vista point, TN - tunnel, T/P - Toll plaza, BR - Bridge
- C - Cloverleaf, S - Stack, T-A - Trumpet-A, T-B - Trumpet-B, DT - Directional-T/Y, SDT - Semi-Directional-T/Y, P-Y - Partial-Y, D - Diamond, P-C - Partial cloverleaf, D-D - Diverging diamond, D-R - Direct ramp

Location	km	mi	Name	Destinations	Notes
Paroi	4.59	2.85	Paroi; Paroi I/S	FT 51 Malaysia Federal Route 51 – Seremban, Ampangan, Kuala Pilah, Seri Menanti, Ulu Bendol Recreational Forest	3-way signalised intersection
Paroi			Taman NZ		
Paroi			Taman Seri Negeri		
Paroi			Desa Ros		
Paroi			Taman Kasih		
Paroi			Taman Guru Melayu		
Paroi			Taman Desa Kenanga Indah		
Senawang			Taman Rashidah Utama		
Senawang			Taman Seri Kasih		
Senawang			Senawang; Persiaran Senawang 1 I/S	FT 242 Persiaran Senawang 1 – Kuala Pilah; Kajang–Seremban Highway – Kuala Lumpur, Cheras, Kajang	3-way intersection
Senawang			Railway crossing bridge		
Senawang	0.00	0.00	Senawang; Senawang I/C	FT 1 Malaysia Federal Route 1 – Seremban, Rembau, Tampin; FT 243 Senawang–NSE Road – Taman Seremban Jaya; North–South Expressway Southern Route / AH2 – Kuala Lumpur, Nilai, Malacca, Johor Bahru	Diamond interchange
1.000 mi = 1.609 km; 1.000 km = 0.621 mi
