= Seremban City Council =

City council in Malaysia

Seremban City Council Majlis Bandaraya Seremban
- Emblem

- Flag

Type
- Type: City council of Seremban

History
- Founded: 1 January 2020

Leadership
- Mayor: Masri Razali
- City Secretary: Mas Midyawan Yahya
- Seats: 24

Meeting place
- Wisma MBS, Persiaran Forest Heights 1, Jalan Seremban-Tampin 70450 Seremban, Negeri Sembilan

Website
- www.mbs.gov.my

Footnotes
- Merger of Seremban Municipal Council and Nilai Municipal Council on 1 January 2020.

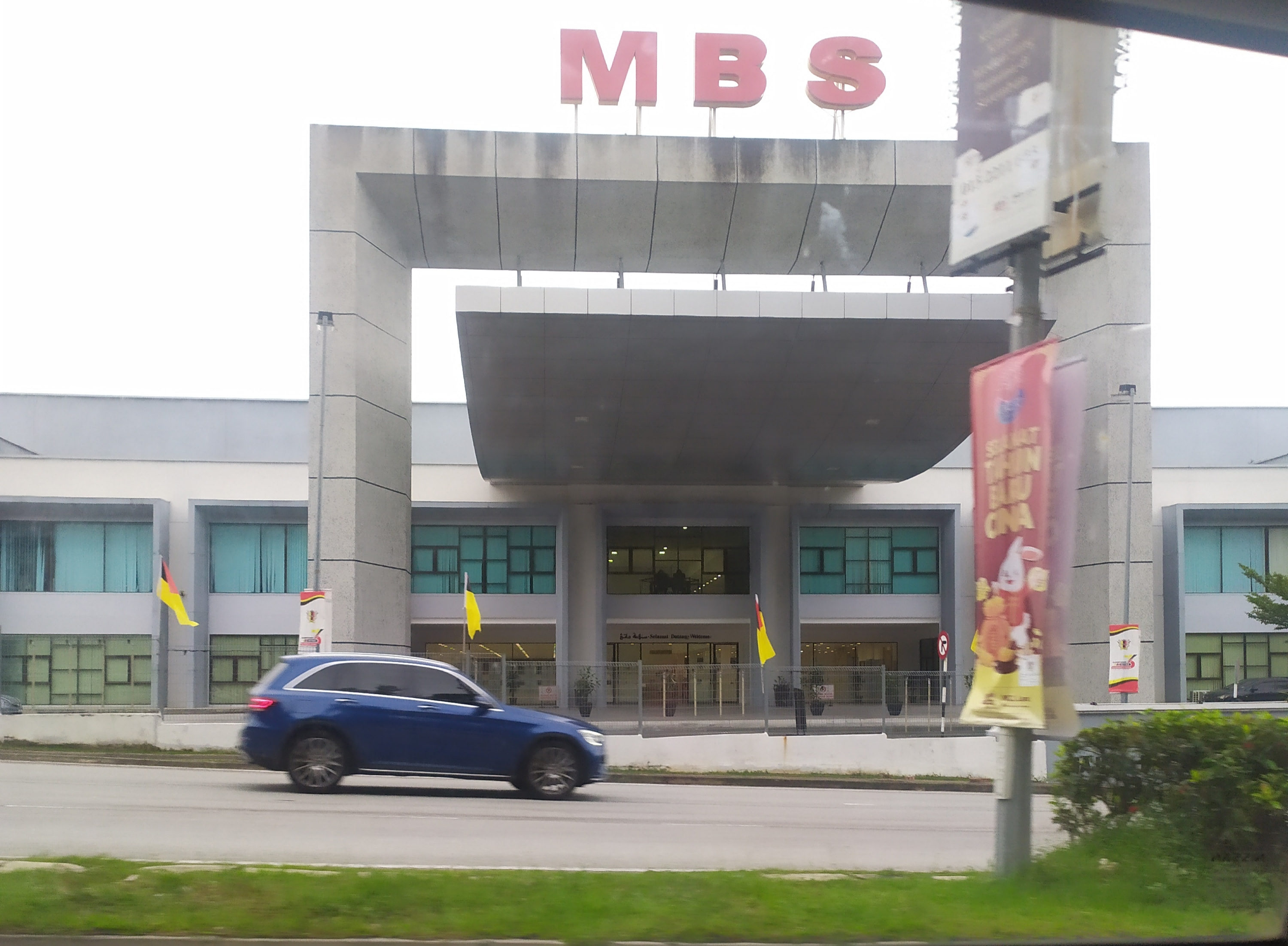
Seremban City Council headquarters arch

Seremban City Council (Malay: Majlis Bandaraya Seremban, abbreviated MBS) is the city council in Malaysia which administers Seremban, the state capital of Negeri Sembilan and the surrounding areas in the Seremban District since 1 January 2020. This agency is under the Negeri Sembilan State Government.

== History ==
Emblem of Seremban Municipal Council.

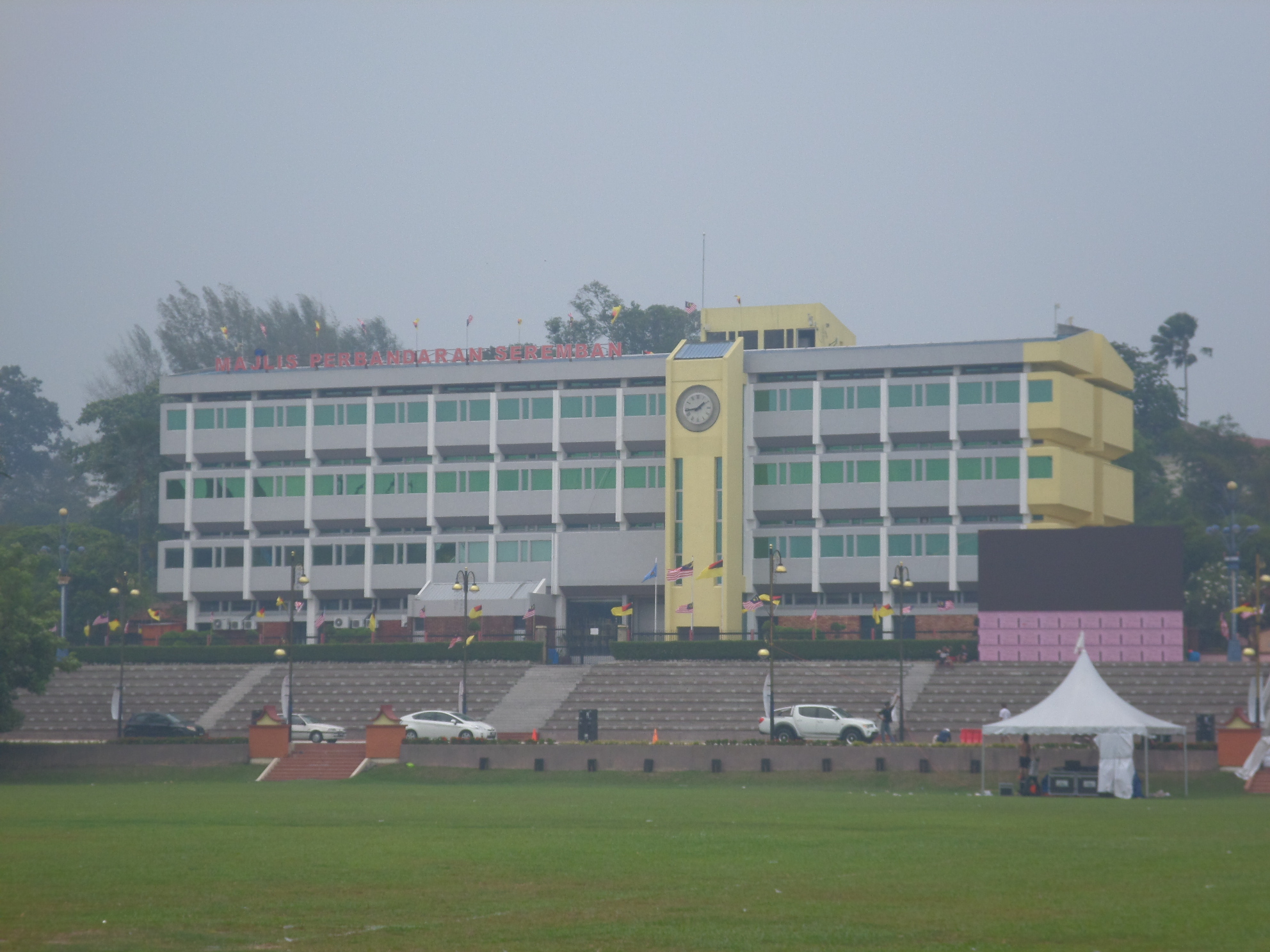
Former Seremban Municipal Council headquarters at Jalan Yamtuan, now the headquarters of the Negeri Sembilan Islamic Religious Affairs Department (Jabatan Hal Ehwal Agama Islam Negeri Sembilan, JHEAINS).

Emblem of Nilai Municipal Council.

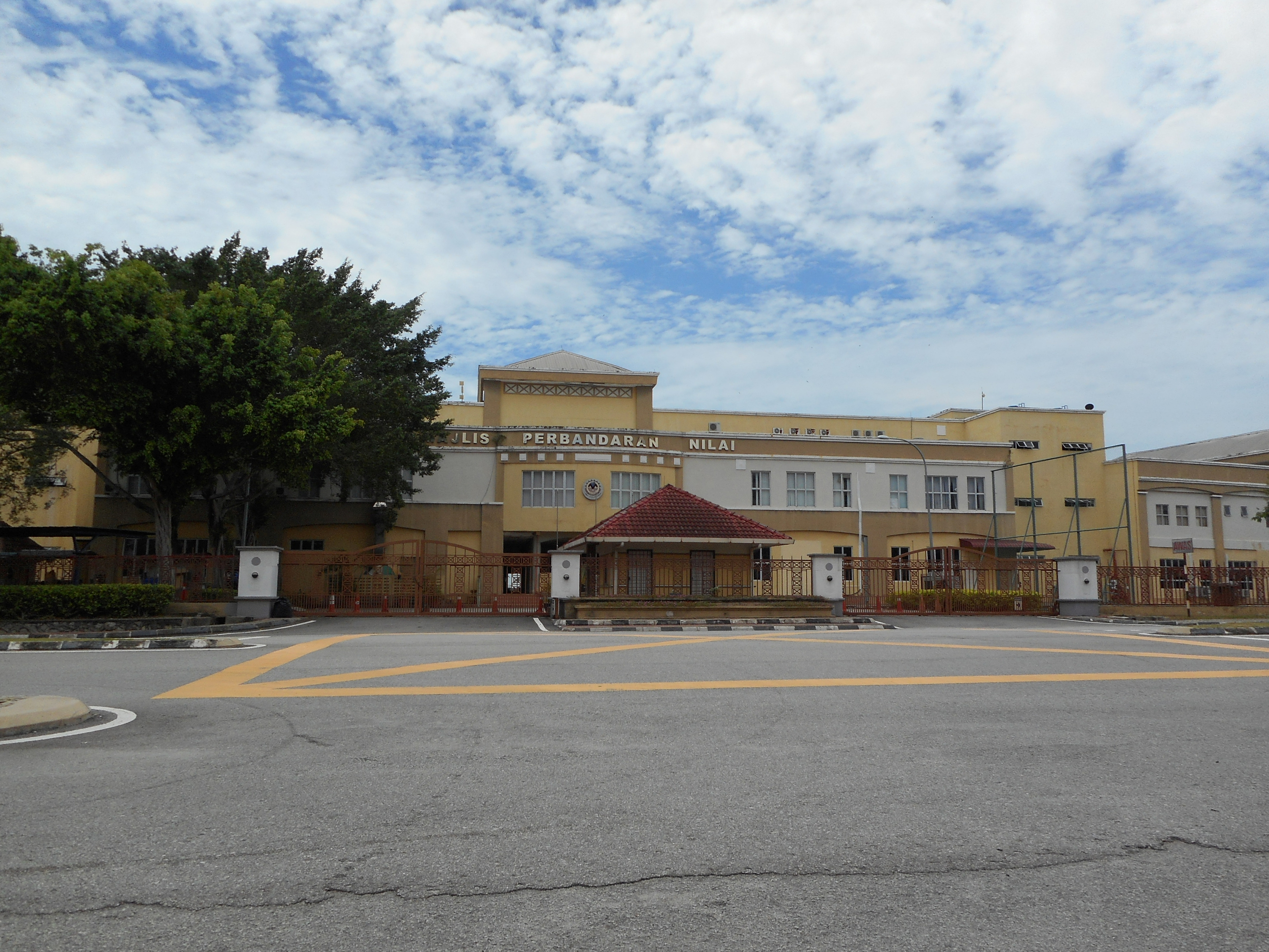
Former Nilai Municipal Council Headquarters at Persiaran Pusat Bandar, Bandar Baru Nilai, now the Nilai branch office of the Seremban City Council.

Seremban City Council Hall at Jalan Yamtuan.

=== Seremban Sanitary Board and Seremban Town Board ===
The town of Seremban was previously administered by the Sanitary Board (Malay: Lembaga Kesihatan) in 1897, which was upgraded into the Town Board (Malay: Lembaga Bandaran) in 1946 following rapid post-war development of the town.

=== Seremban Town Council, 1953–1979 ===
Seremban Town Board was upgraded to the Seremban Town Council (Malay: Majlis Bandaran Seremban) in 1953. From 1954 until 22 July 1965, the Seremban Town Council was led by a president (Malay: Yang Di Pertua) in the office yearly, occasionally sitting for more than a year. Like all local governments in Malaysia, it held annual local elections during that period. On 23 July 1965, the Menteri Besar of Negeri Sembilan took over the post of the president of the Seremban Town Council, which subsequently became the president of the Seremban Municipal Council (Malay: Majlis Perbandaran Seremban) when the town of Seremban was accorded municipality status on 1 March 1979.

Number	Name	Start Of Term	End of Term
1	YM Tunku Mustapha Tunku Besar Burhanuddin	1954	1956
2	Jaafar bin Tahar	1957	1958
3	Tham Tat Ming	1959	1959
4	Robert Singam	1960	1960
5	Lam Teck Choon	1961	1961
6	Chin See Yin	1962	1962
7	Gumam Singh Gill	1963	1964
8	Lai Pong Yuen	1965	22 July 1965
9	Mohamed Said Muhammad	23 July 1965	9 May 1969
10	Mansor Othman	10 May 1969	11 July 1978

=== Seremban Municipal Council, 1979–2019 ===
The trend of sitting Menteri Besar heading the council was overturned in 1998, when the head of the council was an independent individual.

Number	Name	Start Of Term	End of Term
1	Rais Yatim	12 July 1978	28 April 1982
2	Mohd Isa Abdul Samad	29 April 1982	31 July 1998
3	Hassani @ Hassan Mohd. Zain	1 August 1998	7 July 2003
4	Mohd Jaafar Mohd Atan	1 August 2003	15 August 2004
5	Abdul Halim Abdul Latif	1 September 2004	31 July 2018
6	Zazali Salehudin	1 August 2018	31 December 2019

=== Seremban District Council, 1979–2002 ===
Meanwhile, the Seremban District Council (Malay: Majlis Daerah Seremban) was established on 1 January 1979 through the merger of 6 Local Authorities outside Seremban town itself, which are:

- Pajam Local Council (established in 1957)
- Mantin Local Council (established in 1958)
- Rantau Local Council Town Board (established in 1959)
- Nilai Local Council Town Board (established in 1959)
- Broga Local Council Town Board (established in 1959)
- Labu Local Council Town Board (established in 1959)

7 Presidents have led the council throughout its history.

Number	Name	Start Of Term	End of Term
1	Muhd Ghazali Muhd Ibrahim	11 May 1978	30 June 1982
2	Hamidi Bin Abd. Hamid	01 July 1982	15 May 1983
3	Abd Rahman Bin Hj. Ahmad	16.05.1983	30.04.1987
4	Abd Latiff Bin Datuk Masud	01.05.1987	01.12.1991
5	Ariffin Bin Hj. Yusof@Jusoh	02.12.1991	01.12.1992
6	Damanhuri Bin Hussin	01.06.1993	31.05.1998
7	Ahmad Zakki Bin Yahya	01.06.1998	31.01.2002

=== Nilai Municipal Council, 2002–2019 ===
The Seremban District Council was upgraded to the Nilai Municipal Council (Malay: Majlis Perbandaran Nilai) on 2 February 2002. It administered eight mukims (communes) in Seremban District and was led by 3 presidents before merger.

- Mukim Setul
- Mukim Labu
- Mukim Rantau
- Mukim Lenggeng
- Mukim Pantai
- Part of Rasah
- Part of Ampangan
- Part of metropolitan Seremban

Number	Name	Start Of Term	End of Term
1	Noordin Mohd Yatib	1 January 2003	31 December 2007
2	Abdul Halim Abdul Latif	1 January 2008	30 July 2018
3	Zazali Salehudin	1 August 2018	31 December 2019

=== Seremban City Council, 2020–present ===
Seremban Municipal Council and Nilai Municipal Council merged to form the Seremban City Council on 1 January 2020.

== Functions ==
Like all local governments in Malaysia, MBS is responsible for public health and sanitation, waste removal and management, town planning, environmental protection and building control, social and economic development and general maintenance functions of urban infrastructure. The main headquarters is located at the intersection between Persiaran Forest Heights 1 and Jalan Seremban-Tampin in Forest Heights, Rahang, immediately south of downtown Seremban. There are also branches at Bandar Baru Nilai, Jalan Keliling and Jalan Tengku Kursiah.

== Mayor of the Seremban City Council ==
Number	Name	Start Of Term	End of Term
1	Zazali Salehudin	1 January 2020	22 July 2021
2	Masri Razali	23 July 2021	Incumbent

== Departments ==
The council is made up of 11 departments and 7 units as follows.

Number	Department
1	Building Control Department (Jabatan Kawalan Bangunan)
2	Finance Department (Jabatan Kewangan)
3	Engineering Department (Jabatan Kejuruteraan)
4	Services Management Department (Jabatan Khidmat Pengurusan)
5	Community and Public Relations Department (Jabatan Komuniti Dan Perhubungan Awam)
6	Licensing and Cleaning Department (Jabatan Pelesenan dan Pembersihan)
7	Valuation and Property Department (Jabatan Penilaian dan Hartanah)
8	Development Planning Department (Jabatan Perancangan Pembangunan)
9	Department of Parks and Landscape (Jabatan Taman Dan Landskap)
10	Department of Information Technology and Communication (Jabatan Teknologi Maklumat Dan Komunikasi)
11	Law and Enforcement Department (Jabatan Undang-Undang dan Penguatkuasaan)
12	Corporate Communication Unit (Unit Komunikasi Korporat)
13	Integrity Unit (Unit Integriti)
14	Building Commissioner Unit (Unit Pesuruhjaya Bangunan)
15	One Stop Centre Unit (Unit Pusat Setempat)
16	Internal Audit Unit (Unit Audit Dalaman)
17	Meetings, Car Parking & Hall Secretariat Unit (Unit Urusetia Mesyuarat, Letak Kereta & Dewan)

== Member of Seremban City Council ==
The member of Seremban City Council was appointed by the state government to lead the zonning area, here is the list of the member:

Member of Seremban
Zone	Area	Member	Party
Mayor		Ir. Ts. Haji Masri Bin Baharuddin	Independent
06	1 Alam Milenia @ Enstek; 2 Alam Milenia @ Enstek (Persada Jaya); 3 Alam Milenia @ Enstek (Persada Kasih); 4 Alam Milenia @ Enstek (Persada Murni); 5 Cenderawasih @ Enstek; 6 Eka - Matahari; 7 Jentayu @ Enstek; 8 Kampung Lb Johnson; 9 Kampung Tersusun Jijan; 10 Kota Seriemas; 11 Kuarters Klia; 12 Mercato @ Enstek; 13 Taman Amra; 14 Taman Pinggiran Markisa; 15 Taman Seri Labu; 16 Tech Park @enstek; 17 Tech Park 2 @ Enstek; 18 Timur @ Enstek; 19 Timur @ Enstek Embun; 20 Timur @ Enstek Linear; 21 Timur @ Enstek Mediteranian; 22 Timur @ Enstek Parcel G	Hasim Bin Rusdi	BN (UMNO)
21	1 Taman Indah; 2 Taman Temiang Jaya; 3 Limbok (Lobak 15); 4 Taman Sri Pulai 3; 5 Taman Suliana 1 & 2; 6 Kampung Merbah; 7 Taman Rashibah Indah; 8 Taman Kursiah (Sikamat 20); 9 Taman Pulai Perdana; 10 Kampung Bukit Temiang; 11 Taman Sim; 12 Pulai Perdana; 13 Bukit Jong; 14 Taman Bayu Temiang	Awa Hoi Choong	PH (DAP)
10	1 Taman Duyung; 2 Taman Permai; 3 Taman Permai 2; 4 Taman Mutiara Galla; 5 Taman Mutiara Galla 2; 6 Taman Mutiara Galla 4; 7 Taman Permai 3; 8 Kemayan Square; 9 Taman Bukit Kelisa; 10 Taman Mutiara Galla 5; 11 Taman Labu Jaya; 12 Taman Bukit Tembok; 13 Taman Bukit Kristal; 14 Taman Mutiara Galla 3; 15 Taman Harmonium Utama; 16 Taman Seruling Jaya; 17 Taman Permai Jaya; 18 Dataran Sentral; 19 Palm Mall; 20 Garden Avenue; 21 Park Avenue; 22 Sri Carcosa; 23 Garden Homes; 24 Taman AST; 25 Taman Bukit Hijau; 26 Taman Jasper Jaya; 27 Taman Bukit Galena; 28 Taman Bukit Intan; 29 Taman Baiduri; 30 Era Square; 31 Taman Kristal; 32 Bukit Chemara; 33 Taman Labu Utama; 34 Pusat Perniagaan Oasis; 35 Kg. Dato’ Mohd Said; 36 Taman Serunai, Jln Labu; 37 Taman Permai Impian; 38 Kalista Seremban 2; 39 Rasah Kemayan; 40 Taman Bali Villa; 41 Taman Sri Pulasan; 42 Taman Sri Pinang; 43 Taman Mantau Indah 1,2,3; 44 Taman Sri Labu 4; 5 Taman Harmonium Indah; 46 Medan Perniagaan Kepayang; 47 Kawasan Industri Oakland; 48 Vision Homes; 49 Taman Oakland; 50 Taman Megah; 51 Emerald Park; 52 Central Park; 53 Green Homes; 54 Green Street Homes; 55 Taman Bukit Kaya; 56 Taman Bukit Labu; 57 Taman Bukit Kepayang Utama; 58 Taman Bukit Kepayang; 59 Galla Industrial Park; 60 Kampung Tersusun Mutiara Galla; 61 Green Technology Park; 62 One Avenue ( Garden Homes); 63 S2-Biz Avenue / Jusco / Up Town; 64 Pusat Komersial Oakland; 65 Jalan Dato’ Bandar Tunggal; 66 Jalan Yam Tuan; 67 Jalan Yam Tuan (Jalan Paul); 68 Jalan Kong Sang; 69 Jalan Utama Singh; 70 Jalan Dr. Krishnan; 71 Jalan Dato’ Abdul Rahman; 72 Jalan Tuanku Hassan; 73 Jalan Wolf; 74 Jalan Dato’ Lee Foong Yee; 75 Jalan Dato’ Sheikh Ahmad; 76 Jalan Siow Loong Hin; 77 Taman Seri; 78 Jalan Nunis; 79 Terminal One; 80 Arab Malaysian Business Park; 81 Lorong Jawa 1 & 2; 82 Jalan Kapitan Tam Yeong; 83 Lorong Murray Off Jalan Kapitam Tam Yeong; 84 Jalan Lee Sam; 85 Jalan Tuanku Munawir & KM Plaza; 86 Taman Koop	Chong Say Hoo	PH (DAP)
03	1 Pekan Nilai; 2 Taman Ban Aik; 3 Taman Nilai; 4 Taman Ros Merah; 5 Putra Point; 6 Kampung Baru Nilai; 7 Taman Nilai Perdana; 8 Taman Semarak 1 & 2; 9 Rumah Rakyat Nilai; 10 Kawasan Perindustrian Nilai 1 & 2; 11 Kawasan Perindustrian Ringan Taman Semarak; 12 Kawasan Perindustrian Nilai Mini; 13 Desa Indah Fasa 1, 2 & 3; 14 Impiana Residence; 15 Taman Nada Alam; 16 Rumah Rakyat Batang Benar; 17 Taman Bukit Inai; 18 Taman Dahlia; 19 Taman Melor; 20 Taman Mutiara; 21 Taman Murni; 22 Cempaka Puri I, II & III (Apartment); 23 Cempaka Puri IV; 24 Taman Warisan Villa; 25 Desa Melati 1, 2 & 3; 26 Desa Casuarina; 27 Desa Palma Apartment; 28 Nilai Springs Villa 1 & 2; 29 Nilai Springs Heights; 30 Kasturi Heights; 31 Apartment Nilai 3; 32 Taman Desaria Nilai 5; 33 Taman Desa Saga; 34 Taman Teratai; 35 Kawasan Perindustrian Nilai 7; 36 Kawasan Perindustrian Arab Malaysian; 37 Nilai Impian & Nilai Utama; 38 Taman Desa Jasmin 1 & 2; 39 Taman Desa Anggerik; 40 Taman Desa Jati 1 & 2; 41 Taman Desa Kasia; 42 Taman Desa Kolej; 43 Impiana Villa; 44 Nilai Santalia Apartment; 45 Nilai 3; 46 Nilai 1; 47 Desa Jati Apartment; 48 Emville Golf & Country Club; 49 Melati Square; 50 Nilai Square; 51 Putra Indah; 52 Taman Bucida Hijauan; 53 Kawasan Perniagaan Suria; 54 Taman Desa Seringin; 55 Taman Desa Mayang Sari; 56 Terminal Nilai; 57 Nilai Spring Golf & Country Club; 58 Kawasan Perindustrian Nilai Utama; 59 Yadin Impiana	Thanabalan a/l Ramiah	PH (DAP)
20	1 Taman Sikamat Utama; 2 Taman Sikamat Jaya; 3 Taman Sri Pulai 1; 4 Taman Desa Rhu; 5 Taman Sri Penaga 2; 6 Taman Kayu Manis; 7 Kampung Jalan Sikamat; 8 Kampung Ujong Pasir; 9 Taman Perwira; 10 Rumah Rakyat Sikamat; 11 Rumah Rakyat Sikamat 2; 12 Taman Megaway; 13 Taman Meranti Jaya; 14 Taman Desa Permai; 15 Kampung Merbah Indah; 16 Taman Angsana, Sikamat; 17 Taman Sri Pulai 2; 18 Taman Ujong Pasir; 19 Taman Jujur; 20 Taman Pelangi; 21 Taman Bukit Nibong; 22 Taman Seri Inai; 23 Taman Coral Height; 24 Taman Selaseh	Rosslan Bin Hassan	PH (PKR)
18	1 Taman Lee Siew Joo; 2 Jalan Seremban Kuala Pilah; 3 Kg. Baru Blok B; 4 Bandar Baru Ampangan (Pasar Ampangan & UTC); 5 Bandar Baru Ampangan (Benteng Ampangan & Kedai-kedai Sekitar BSN); 6 Kg. Baru Blok A; 7 Kg. Ismail; 8 Taman Seri Rambai; 9 Kg. Bahagia Jiboi; 10 Rumah Murah Jiboi; 11 Kg. Sekolah (sebelah Kg. Ismail); 12 Kg. Jiboi Baru; 13 Kg. Sungai Pupuh; 14 Kg. Durian Tiga Batang; 15 Taman Syukur; 16 Flat UDA; 17 Gedong Lalang 50; 18 Kg. Gedong Lalang Lama; 19 Taman Golf Height; 20 Pusat Perniagaan Paroi (PPP); 21 Taman Pinggiran Golf; 22 Taman Paroi Jaya; 23 Taman PJ Perdana; 24 Taman Casurian; 25 Flat Casurina; 26 Taman NZ; 27 Jalan Paroi Senawang; 28 Taman Tulip Indah; 29 Kg. Sekolah (area Stesyen Minyak Petronas); 30 Gedong Lalang 162; 31 Perumahan Gedong Lalang; 32 Taman Dato Wan; 33 Kg. Gelanggang; 34 Taman Negeri; 35 Taman Seri Landak; 36 Taman Seri Negeri; 37 Taman Bourgainville; 38 Taman Bukit Kelana; 39 Taman Melati Indah; 40 Taman Bourganville Idaman	Abdul Malek Bin Adam	PH (PKR)
09	1 Kampung Baru Labu Batu 8; 2 Kampung Tiroi; 3 Pekan Labu Batu 10; 4 Rumah Rakyat Batu 7; 5 Rumah Rakyat Batu 10 Labu; 6 Taman Labu Indah; 7 Taman Pekan Labu; 8 S2 Heights; 9 Bandar Ainsdale; 10 Bandar Ainsdale @ Mekar; 11 Bandar Ainsdale @ Murni; 12 Bandar Ainsdale @ Segar; 13 Rimbun Harapan; 14 Taman Tiroi; 15 Rimbun Irama; 16 Rimbun Harmoni; 17 Rimbun Impian; 18 Rimbun Alam; 19 Rimbun Vista; 20 Rimbun Aman	Lee Kai Yet	PH (DAP)
01	1 Kampung Baru Broga; 2 Kampung Baru Ulu Beranang; 3 Kampung Tengah; 4 Kawasan Industri Ulu Beranang; 5 Pekan Broga; 6 Pekan Lenggeng; 7 Pekan Ulu Beranang; 8 Rumah Rakyat Lenggeng; 9 Rumah Rakyat Ulu Beranang; 10 Taman Arawana; 11 Taman Broga; 12 Taman Desa Klana; 13 Taman Kenari; 14 Taman Klana Jaya; 15 Taman Melati; 16 Taman Ulu Beranang	Lim Chun Weng	PH (DAP)
08	1 Idaman Bayu 1; 2 Idaman Bayu 2; 3 Idaman Villa; 4 Nusari Aman 1A; 5 Nusari Aman 1B; 6 Nusari Aman 2; 7 Nusari Aman 2A; 8 Nusari Aman 2D; 9 Nusari Aman 3A; 10 Nusari Bayu 1; 11 Nusari Bayu 2A; 12 Nusari Bayu 2B; 13 Nusari Bayu 3; 14 Nusari Bayu Biz; 15 Nusari Biz; 16 Sendayan Metro Park; 17 Sendayan Tech Valley; 18 Bandar Seri Sendayan @ Hijayu 1A-1; 19 Bandar Seri Sendayan @ Hijayu 1A-2; 20 Bandar Seri Sendayan @ Hijayu 1B; 21 Hijayu 3; 22 Bandar Seri Sendayan @ Hijayu 3A; 23 Bandar Seri Sendayan @ Hijayu 3B; 24 Bandar Seri Sendayan @ Hijayu 3C; 25 Bandar Seri Sendayan @ Hijayu 3D; 26 Suriaman 1; 27 Suriaman 2; 28 Suriaman 2A; 29 Suriaman 2B; 30 Suriaman 3; 31 Taman Ara Impian; 32 Bandar Seri Sendayan; 33 Bandar Seri Sendayan @ Hijayau 2B Resort Homes; 34 Hijayu Aman; 35 Kampung Sendayan Labu; 36 Laman Sendayan; 37 Nusari Bayu, Bandar Seri Sendayan; 38 Hijayu 1A, Bandar Seri Sendayan; 39 Hijayu 2, Bandar Seri Sendayan; 40 Taman Sendayan Indah; 41 Taman Bukit Sendayan; 42 Pekan Rantau; 43 Pekan Kuala Sawah; 44 Taman Rantau; 45 Taman Pasir Mas; 46 Taman Bunga Raya; 47 Taman Sri Ramai; 48 Taman Bunga Raya Kuala Sawah; 49 Taman Bunga Sejati; 50 Taman Bunga Orkid; 51 Taman Rantau Jaya; 52 Taman Sri Anggerik; 53 Taman Cempaka; 54 Taman Delima; 55 Taman Kristal; 56 Taman Mawar; 57 Taman Bandar Ekar; 58 Taman Sri Intan; 59 Taman Jed Indah; 60 Taman Mutiara; 61 Taman Emas Perdana; 62 Taman Berlian; 63 Kg. Masjid; 64 Rumah Rakyat Nyatoh; 65 Rumah Rakyat Linsum; 66 Rumah Rakyat Rantau 1; 67 Rumah Rakyat Rantau 2; 68 Taman / Kampung / Industri; 69 Taman Baiduri PPR Rantau; 70 Taman Rantau Tin; 71 Taman Angsamas Fasa 1; 72 Taman Angsamas Fasa 2; 73 Pekan Sagga; 74 Kampung Bemban; 75 Rumah Rakyat Rasah Mambau; 76 Taman Merlin Height; 77 Taman Sri Mambau; 78 Taman Kelab Tuanku Fasa 1; 79 Taman Kelab Tuanku Fasa 2; 80 Taman Pari; 81 Kg. Batu 6 Jalan Seremban - PD; 82 Taman Iringan Bayu Fasa 2A; 83 Taman Iringan Bayu Fasa 2B; 84 Taman Iringan Bayu Fasa 2C; 85 Taman Iringan Bayu Fasa 2D; 86 Taman Iringan Bayu Fasa 3A; 87 Taman Iringan Bayu Fasa 3B; 88 Taman Iringan Bayu Fasa 3C; 89 Taman Iringan Bayu Fasa 3D; 90 Taman Iringan Bayu Fasa 8A; 91 Taman Iringan Bayu Fasa 8B1; 92 Taman Iringan Bayu Fasa 8B2; 93 Taman Iringan Bayu Fasa 8C	Hamdan Bin Md Nor	BN (UMNO)
02	1 Bandar Tasik Senangin Seksyen 1; 2 Bandar Tasik Senangin Seksyen 2; 3 Bandar Tasik Senangin Seksyen 3; 4 Bandar Tasik Senangin Seksyen 10; 5 Bandar Tasik Senangin Seksyen 11; 6 Bandar Tasik Senangin Seksyen 12; 7 Bandar Tasik Senangin Seksyen 13; 8 Bandar Tasik Senangin Seksyen 15; 9 Bandar Tasik Senangin Seksyen 16; 10 Bandar Tasik Senangin Seksyen 17; 11 Bandar Tasik Senangin Seksyen 18; 12 Bandar Tasik Senangin Seksyen 19; 13 Bandar Tasik Senangin Seksyen 5; 14 Bandar Tasik Senangin Seksyen 6; 15 Bandar Tasik Senangin Seksyen 7; 16 Bandar Tasik Senangin Seksyen 8; 17 Bandar Tasik Senangin Seksyen 9	Mazalan Bin Maarop	BN (UMNO)
17	1 Kampung Baru Pantai; 2 Kampung Baru Paroi; 3 Kampung Melayu Panchor; 4 Kampung Panchor; 5 Kampung Tok Dagang; 6 Kompleks Sukan Negeri; 7 Pekan Pantai; 8 Residensi SIGC; 9 Rumah Murah Panchor; 10 Rumah Rakyat Pantai; 11 Taman Ampangan; 12 Taman Ampangan Fasa 3; 13 Taman Cengal Utama; 14 Taman Desa Dato Kelana Pantai; 15 Taman Jemerlang; 16 Taman Margosa; 17 Taman Palma Jaya; 18 Taman Panchor Jaya; 19 Taman Sri Telawi	Lattefah Binti Aliyaru Kunju	BN (UMNO)
07	1 Taman Gadong Indah; 2 Taman Gadong Putra; 3 Taman Gadong Jaya; 4 Taman Cermai Impian; 5 Planters Heaven; 6 Taman Sri Rambai; 7 Tmn Dato' Shahardin @ Rumah Rakyat Batu 13, Labu; 8 Taman Nilai Setia; 9 Bandar Enstek; 10 Malaysia Vision Valley; 11 Eka Matahari; 12 Kampung Lambar; 13 Tiara Sendayan; 14 Taman Bakti YNS	Mohd Fairus Bin Rosli	BN (UMNO)
24	1 Kawasan Industri Pantai; 2 Taman Seri Bayu; 3 Taman Desa Orkid; 4 Taman Cempaka; 5 Taman Cempaka 2; 6 Taman Cempaka 3; 7 Taman Ros Mewah; 8 Taman Sri Pagi; 9 Taman Matahari Height; 10 Taman Rasa Sayang; 11 Taman Lily; 12 Taman Marida; 13 Taman Kemuning; 14 Taman Senawang Jaya; 15 Taman Alamanda; 16 Taman Desa Dahlia; 17 Taman Satria; 18 Taman Desa Melor; 19 Taman Desa Melor Indah; 20 Taipan 1 & 2; 21 Mydin Business Centre; 22 Cattleya; 23 Villa Kasia; 24 Villa Angsi	Mohamad Fadil Bin Md Zin	BN (UMNO)
19	1 Kampung Baru Sikamat; 2 Taman Sri Penaga; 3 Taman England; 4 Taman Sikamat; 5 Taman Pinang Gading; 6 Taman Desa Beringin; 7 Acasia Country Height; 8 Taman Zaiton Indah; 9 Kampung Bukit Ampangan; 10 Taman Selasih; 11 Laman Puteri; 12 Taman Seri Pandan; 13 Villa Suria; 14 Taman Warisan Puteri; 15 Taman College Height; 16 Taman Ampangan Jaya; 17 Seremban Putra; 18 Kiara Indah; 19 Sikamat Indah; 20 Taman Sena Jaya; 21 Taman Desa Manggis; 22 Taman Kiara Indah; 23 Taman Bukit Penaga; 24 Taman Penaga Mewah; 25 Taman Penaga Indah; 26 Laman Akasia; 27 Taman Sri Pandan 2	Muhamad Norhafiz Bin Ismail	PH (PKR)
04	1 Desa Cempaka 1; 2 Desa Cempaka 2; 3 Desa Cempaka 3; 4 Cempaka Court (Apartment); 5 Cempakapuri 1 & 2 Apartment; 6 Cempakapuri 3; 7 Desa Cempaka; 8 Desa Cempaka Special Scheme; 9 Desa Cempaka Scheme	Telagapathi a/p Marimuthu	PH (PKR)
16	1 Taman Sri Rahang; 2 Jalan Keliling; 3 Jalan Medan Rahang; 4 Jalan Lake View; 5 Jalan Dato’ Mohd Said; 6 Jalan Penghulu Cantik; 7 Jalan Datuk Muda Linggi; 8 Jalan Datuk Siamang Gagap; 9 Kondominium Klana Kasturi; 10 Seremban Centre Point; 11 Betaria Business Centre; 12 Taman Cermai Jaya; 13 Taman Murugesu; 14 Bukit Ampangan; 15 Jalan Jelebu Batu 2 sampai Simpang Ke Kg. Datuk Dagang; 16 Taman Nyior Hijau; 18 Lake View; 19 Taman Nyior (Kawasan Kuil); 20 Taman Dusun Nyior @ Rumah Murah Dusun Nyior; 21 Taman Nyior Gading; 22 Taman Kekwa; 23 Taman Dusun Setia; 24 Taman Purba; 25 Taman Nyior (Kawasan Kg. Baru Blok C); 26 Kg. Baru Blok C; 27 Kg. Dusun Nyior; 28 Taman Sakura; 29 Taman Datuk Shahbandar; 30 Taman Seri Tanjung; 31 Kg. Sungai Landak; 32 Taman Bakawali; 33 Taman Bukti Setia; 34 Taman Bukti; 35 Taman Desa Rose; 36 Jalan Dunsman	Roslan Bin Abd Aziz	PH (AMANAH)
12	1 Taman Pinggiran Senawang; 2 Bandar Seremban Selatan; 3 Villa Negeri; 4 Bukit Negeri; 5 Senawang Perdana; 6 RTM; 7 Kg. Ulu Rantau; 8 Taman Sri Permata; 9 Ladang Kombok; 10 Kg. Ulu Lalang; 11 Seri Lalang; 12 Rumah Rakyat Ulu Lalang; 13 Taman Tuanku Jaafar; 14 Kawasan Industri Taman Tuanku Jaafar	Krishnan a/l Ramalingam	BN (MIC)
14	1 Taman Bandar Senawang; 2 Taman Desa Anggerik; 3 Taman Desa Flora; 4 Taman Desa Flora 2; 5 Taman Desa Ixora; 6 Taman Jasmin; 7 Taman Jasmin Indah; 8 Taman Jasmin Indah 2; 9 Taman Kobena; 10 Taman Lavender Height; 11 Taman Matahari Indah; 12 Taman Nusa Intan; 13 Taman Senawang Indah; 14 Taman Senawang Indah 2; 15 Taman Sri Paroi; 16 Taman Teratai; 17 Taman Widuri; 18 Kawasan Perindustrian Senawang; 19 Kawasan Perindustrian Ringan Senawang	Chong Jin Wei	BN (MCA)
