= Malaysia Federal Route 242 =

Road in Malaysia

Federal Route 242
- Persiaran Senawang 1

Route information
- Maintained by Malaysian Public Works Department
- Length: 4.70 km (2.92 mi)

Major junctions
- North end: Paroi-Lekas Interchange; Kajang–Seremban Highway
- Kajang–Seremban Highway; FT 51 Federal Route 51; FT 97 Federal Route 97
- South end: Jalan Senawang-Paroi Intersection; FT 97 Federal Route 97

Location
- Country: Malaysia
- Primary destinations: Senawang, Seremban, Seri Menanti, Kuala Pilah

Highway system
- Highways in Malaysia; Expressways; Federal; State

Persiaran Senawang 1 (English: Senawang Boulevard 1), designated as Malaysia Federal Route 242, is a dual-carriageway federal road in Seremban, Negeri Sembilan, Malaysia. Linking Paroi and Senawang, this dual-carriageway serves as the bypass of the Seremban city centre to Kuala Pilah and vice versa. This dual-carriageway may also provide a direct link between the North–South Expressway Southern Route and the Kajang–Seremban Highway. The Kilometre Zero of the Federal Route 242 is at Paroi.

== History ==
=== Construction at Paroi Interchange ===
The project was built as a replacement of the former signalised four-way intersection between Persiaran Senawang 1 (Federal Route 242) Federal Route 51 and Kajang–Seremban Highway E21. Construction began in 2012 and was scheduled to be completed in 2014.

==== LEKAS-NSE Link ====
PLUS Malaysia Berhad (PMB), the operator of the North South Expressway (NSE), has proposed to build a toll road in Senawang, Negeri Sembilan, linking the Kajang–Seremban Highway (Lekas) E21 to the North–South Expressway Southern Route E2.

== Features ==
At most sections, the Federal Route 242 was built under the JKR U4 road standard, allowing maximum speed limit of up to 70 km/h (43 mph).

== Junction lists ==
The entire route is located in Seremban District, Negeri Sembilan.

Legend:

- I/C - Interchange, I/S - Intersection, RSA - Rest and service area, OBR - Overhead bridge restaurant, R/R - Restaurant and rest plaza, L/B - Layby, V/P - Vista point, TN - tunnel, T/P - Toll plaza, BR - Bridge
- C - Cloverleaf, S - Stack, T-A - Trumpet-A, T-B - Trumpet-B, DT - Directional-T/Y, SDT - Semi-Directional-T/Y, P-Y - Partial-Y, D - Diamond, P-C - Partial cloverleaf, D-D - Diverging diamond, D-R - Direct ramp

Location	km	mi	Name	Destinations	Notes
Paroi			Through to Kajang–Seremban Highway		
Paroi	0.0	0.0	Paroi-Lekas I/C	FT 51 Malaysia Federal Route 51 – Seremban City Centre, Ampangan, Paroi, Kuala Pilah, Seri Menanti, Ulu Bendol Recreational Forest	Multi-level stack interchange
Paroi			Paroi River bridge		
Senawang			Taman Tasik Jaya		
Senawang			Lavender Heights I/S	Jalan Lavender Heights – Lavender Heights	3-way intersection
Senawang			Taman Tasik Jaya I/S	Persiaran Bunga Tanjung 1 – Taman Tasik Jaya, Senawang Baru Industrial Area	4-way intersection
Senawang			Persiaran Senawang 2 I/S	Persiaran Senawang 2 – Taman Marida, Taman Senawang Jaya, Taman Jasmin, Taman Anggerik, Taman Widuri Indah, Taman Kobena, Desa Flora	3-way intersection
Senawang			Senawang Commercial Centre I/S	Persiaran Senawang 7 – Taman Rasa Sayang, Taman Cempaka; Jalan Taman Komersial Senawang 1 – Taman Komersial Senawang, Giant Hypermarket Senawang, McDonald's Drive Thru	4-way intersection
Senawang			Persiaran Senawang 2 I/S	Persiaran Senawang 2 – Taman Marida, Taman Senawang Jaya, Taman Jasmin, Taman Anggerik, Taman Widuri Indah, Taman Kobena, Desa Flora	3-way intersection
Senawang	4.7	2.9	Jalan Senawang–Paroi I/S	FT 97 Malaysia Federal Route 97 – Paroi, Seremban town centre	3-way intersection
Senawang			Through to FT 97 Malaysia Federal Route 97		
1.000 mi = 1.609 km; 1.000 km = 0.621 mi: Route transition
