= Senawang =

Coordinates: 2°42′N 101°59′E

Senawang Sonawang (Negeri Sembilan Malay)
- Suburb of Seremban
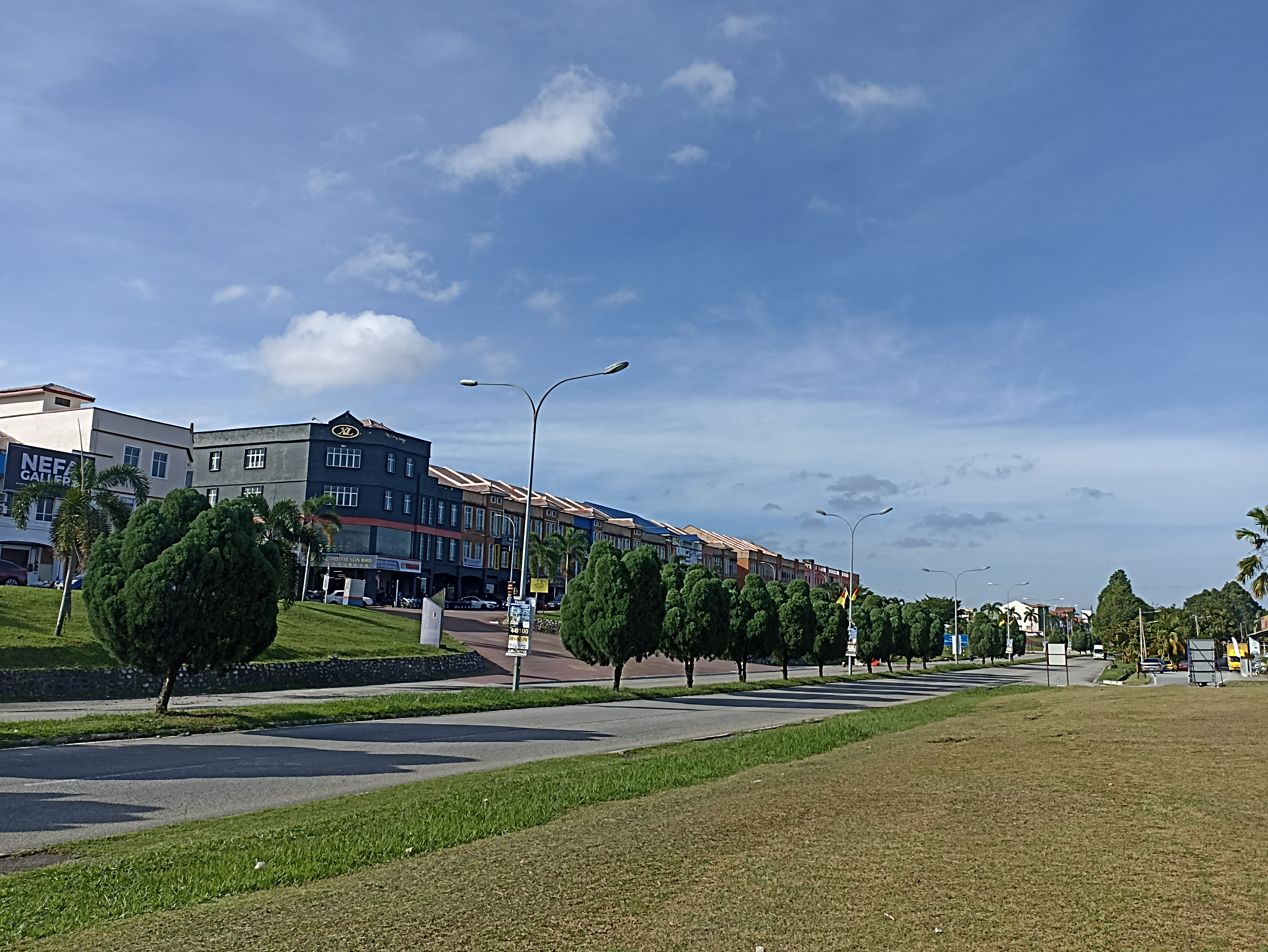
- Persiaran Senawang 1, downtown Senawang
- Interactive map of Senawang
- Country: Malaysia
- State: Negeri Sembilan
- District: Seremban
- Luak: Sungai Ujong

Government
  - Body: Seremban City Council
  - Mayor: Masri Baharuddin
  - MP: Cha Kee Chin (PH–DAP)
  - MLA: Mugunthan Subramaniam (PH–DAP)
- Time zone: UTC+8 (MST)
- Postcode: 70450

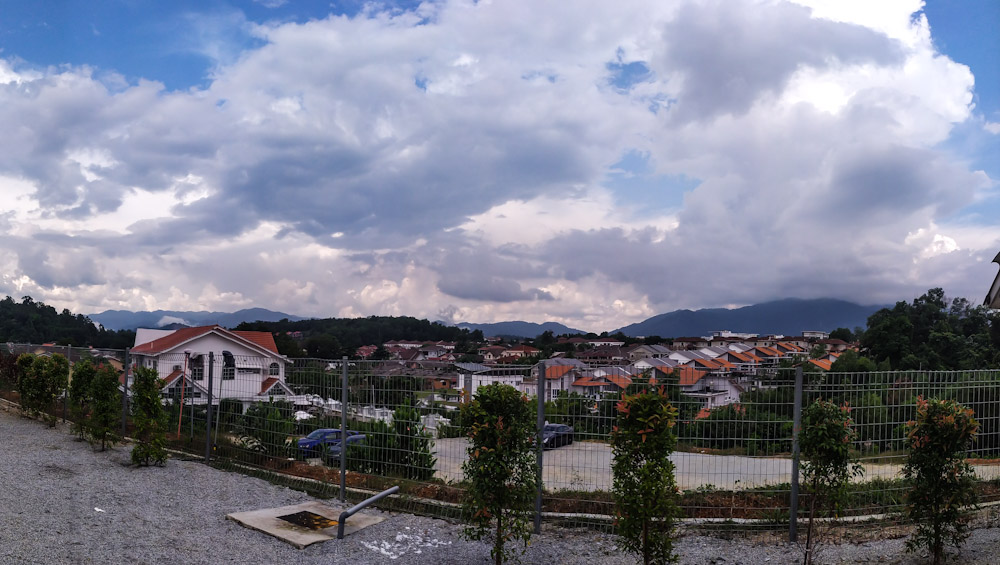
Senawang skyline with the Titiwangsa Mountains in the background

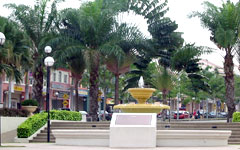
Senawang Square, Senawang Commercial Park

Senawang in Seremban District

Senawang (Negeri Sembilan Malay: Sonawang, Chinese: 六條石; pinyin: Liùtiáoshí; Jyutping: luk^{6}tiu^{4}sek^{6}, Lok Thiu Shak) is a suburb in Seremban, Negeri Sembilan, Malaysia. It is administered by the Seremban City Council.

It is at the south of Seremban neighbouring two districts, Rembau and Kuala Pilah.

== Neighbourhoods ==
- Lavender Heights
- Taman Bandar Senawang
- Taman Matahari Height
- Taman Seri Pagi
- Taman Teratai
- Taman Tuanku Jaafar
- Taman Tasik Jaya
- Taman Kobena
- Taman Desa Dahlia
- Taman Desa Ixora
- Taman Desa Orkid
- Taman Desa Melor
- Taman Desa Melor Indah
- Taman Desa Flora
- Taman Senawang Indah
- Taman Nusa Intan
- Taman Alamanda
- Taman Cempaka
- Taman Cendana
- Taman Senawang Jaya
- Taman Cattleya
- Taman Sri Mawar
- Taman Sri Kasih
- Taman Lily
- Taman Setia Hati
- Taman Komersial Senawang
- Angsi Ville
- Kasia Ville
- Taman Marida
- Taman Widuri
- Taman Jasmin
- Taman Bukit Emas
- Seremban Forest Heights
- Taman Guru
- Taman Rashidah Utama
- Taman Rasa Sayang
- Taman Ros Mewah
- Taman Kiambang Indah
- Taman Satria

== Economy ==
=== Industrial sector ===
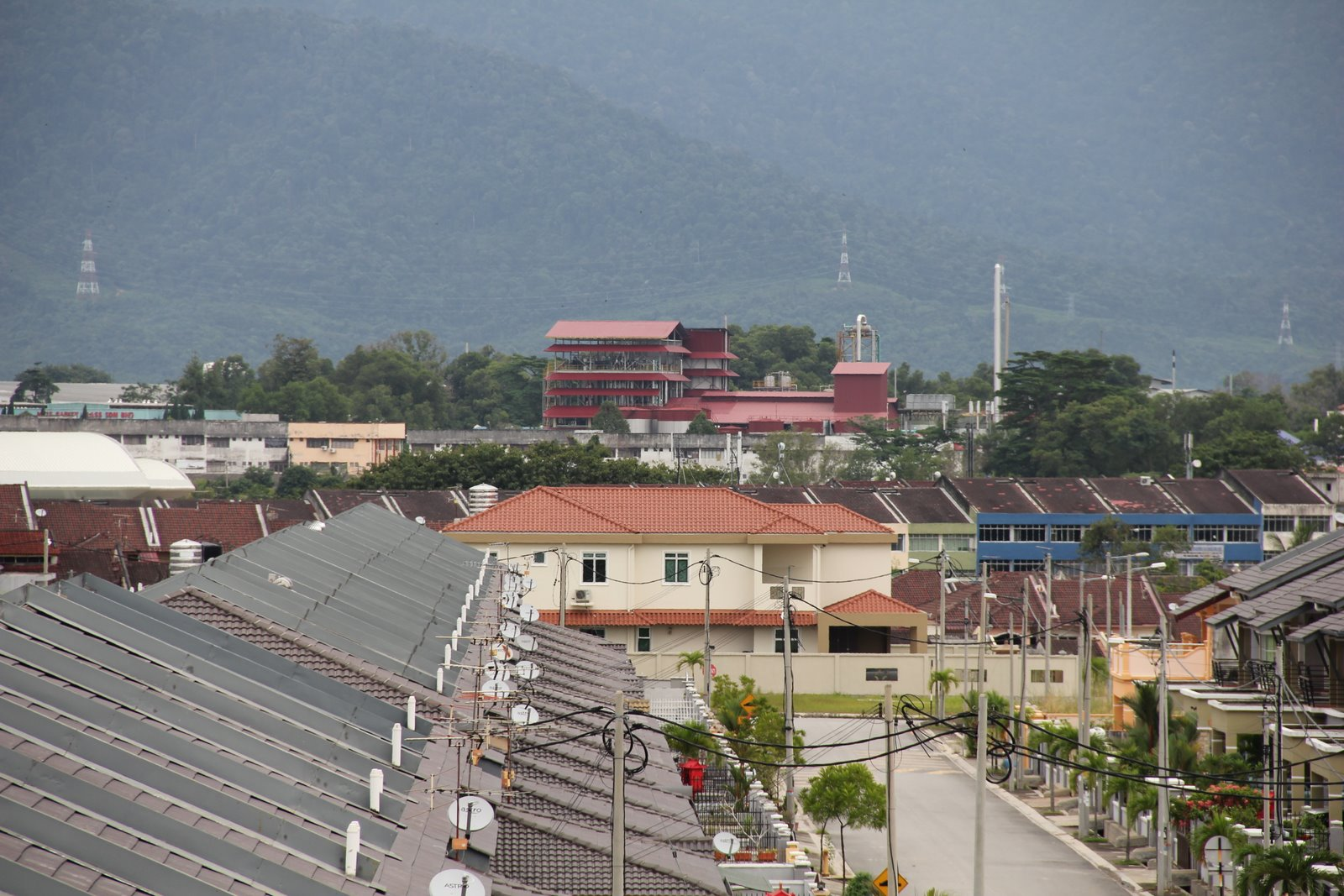
An industrial area in Senawang

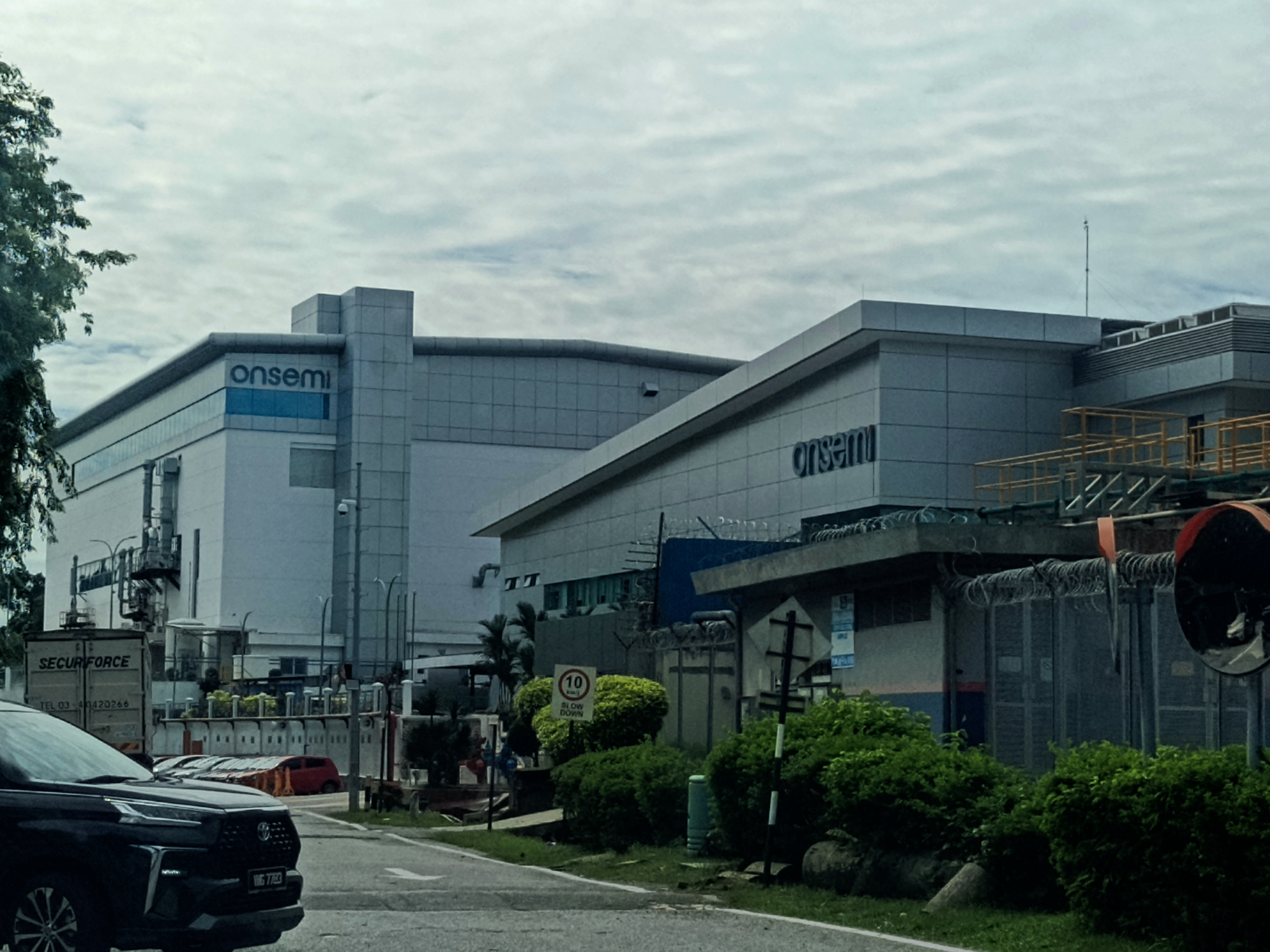
onsemi plant, Senawang

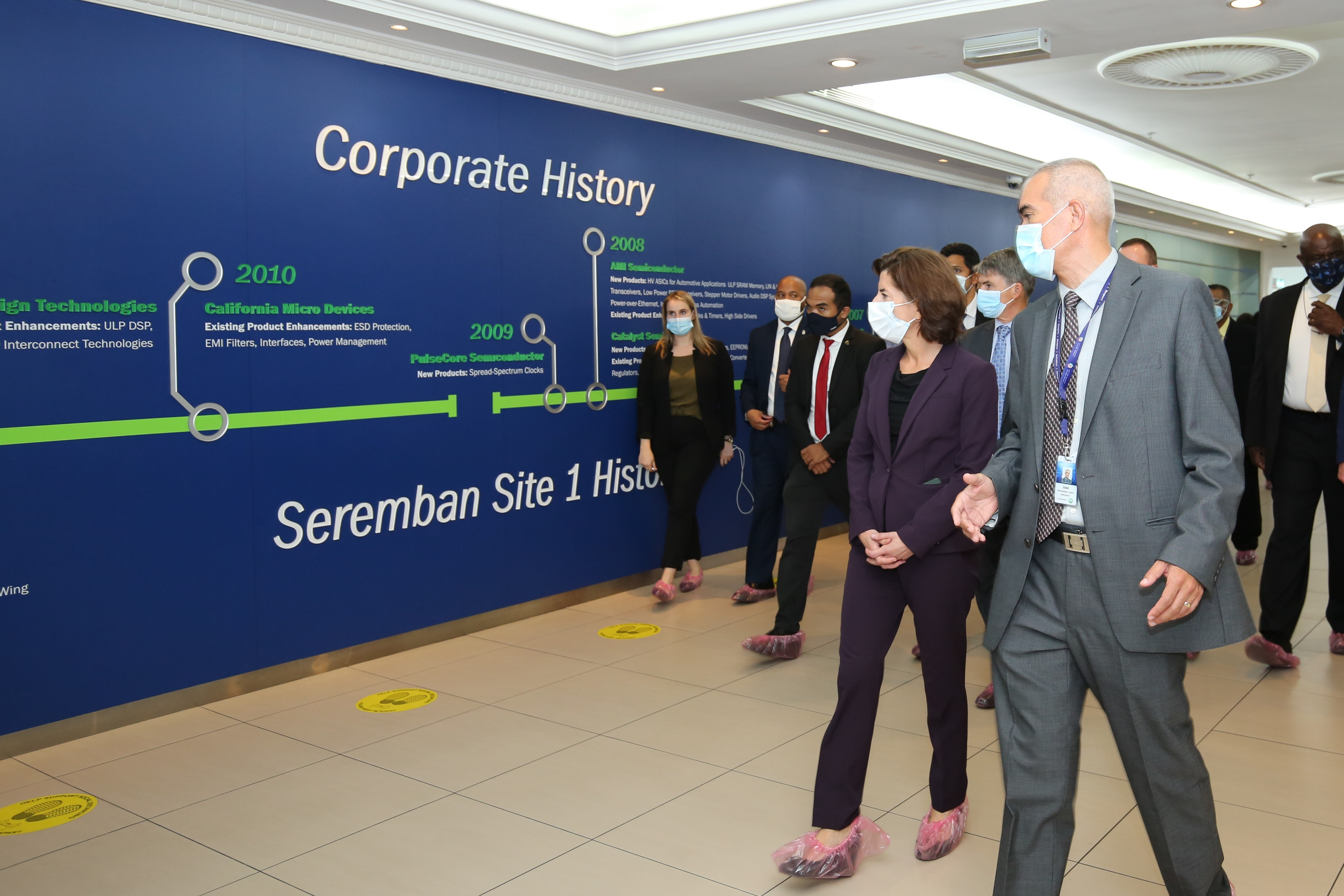
Gina Raimondo's 2021 visit to onsemi's Senawang facility

Senawang has a mature industrial background, therefore the town is known as one of Negeri Sembilan's primary hubs of industry, alongside Bandar Sri Sendayan, Chembong, Nilai and Bandar Enstek. Sri Senawang Light Industries is an industrial area in Senawang, adjacent to the interchange between Federal Routes 242 and 97. A notable electronics manufacturing company is onsemi, others are located in Tuanku Jaafar Light Industrial area such as Samsung SDS and NXP Semiconductors. Other companies in Senawang area include Seagate Systems (Malaysia) Sdn Bhd in New Senawang Industrial Area (Malay: Kawasan Perusahaan Senawang Baru).

Senawang is included in the Parcel F of the Malaysia Vision Valley economic corridor, which intends to bolster its E&E industry, mainly semiconductor devices.

=== Retail ===
==== Senawang Commercial Park ====
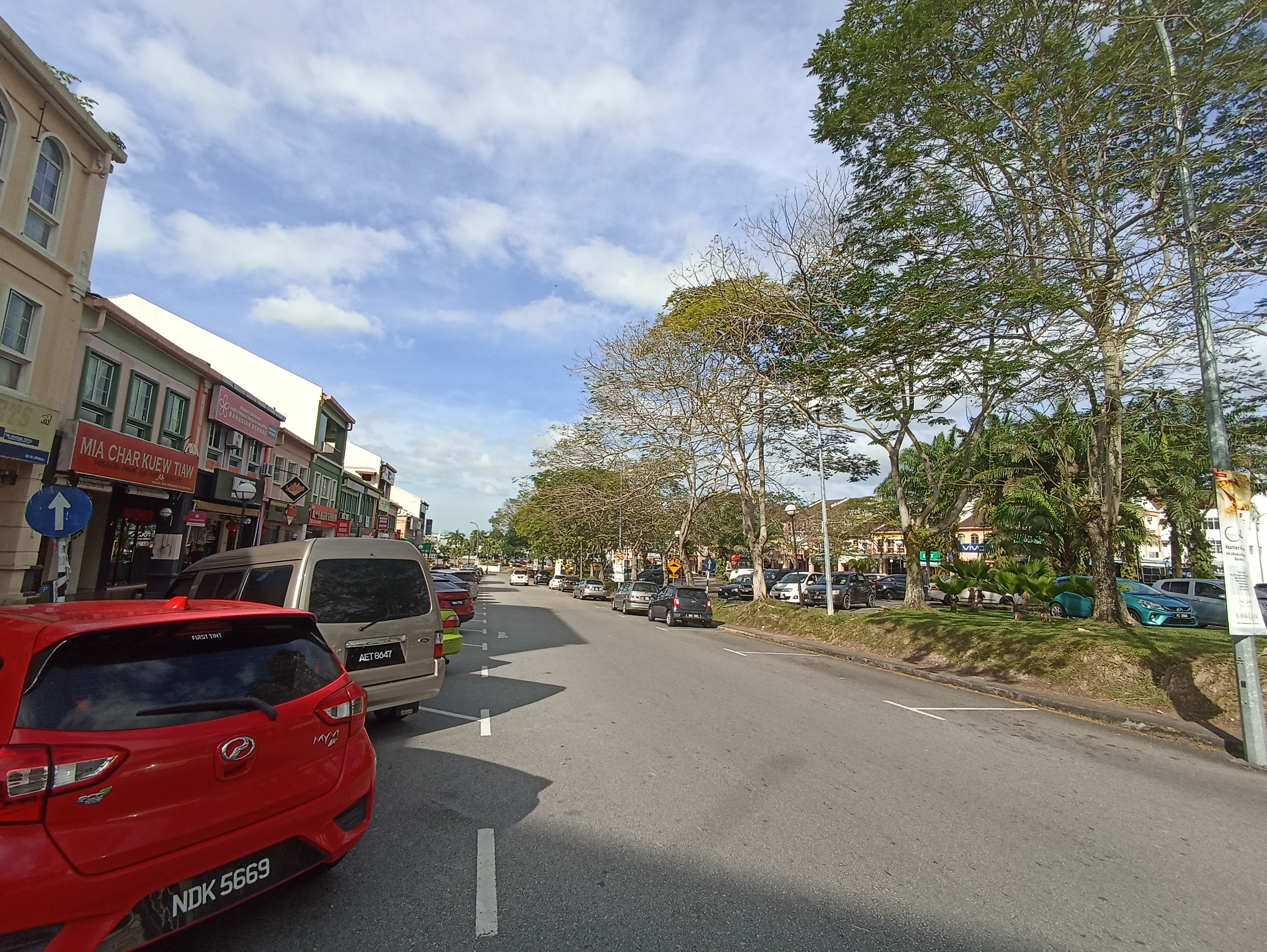
Senawang Commercial Park

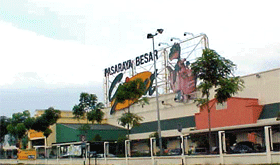
Giant Hypermarket Senawang

Senawang Commercial Park (Malay: Taman Komersial Senawang) also known as Taipan Senawang or Dataran Senawang is the major retail centre in Senawang.

It includes Giant hypermarket and eateries such as McDonald's, KFC, Pizza Hut, Domino's Pizza and Secret Recipe.

Commercial banks includes Maybank, Bank Rakyat, Bank Simpanan Nasional, and RHB Bank.

==== Senawang City Centre ====
Senawang City Centre (Malay: Pusat Bandar Senawang) includes amenities such as Proton service centre, a Pos Malaysia (Pos Laju) centre and sports complex for futsal. It also includes major retail lots known as Taipan 2 Senawang which is the extension of Taipan Senawang located side by side to each other.

Commercial banks includes Bank Islam, Affin Bank and SME Bank.

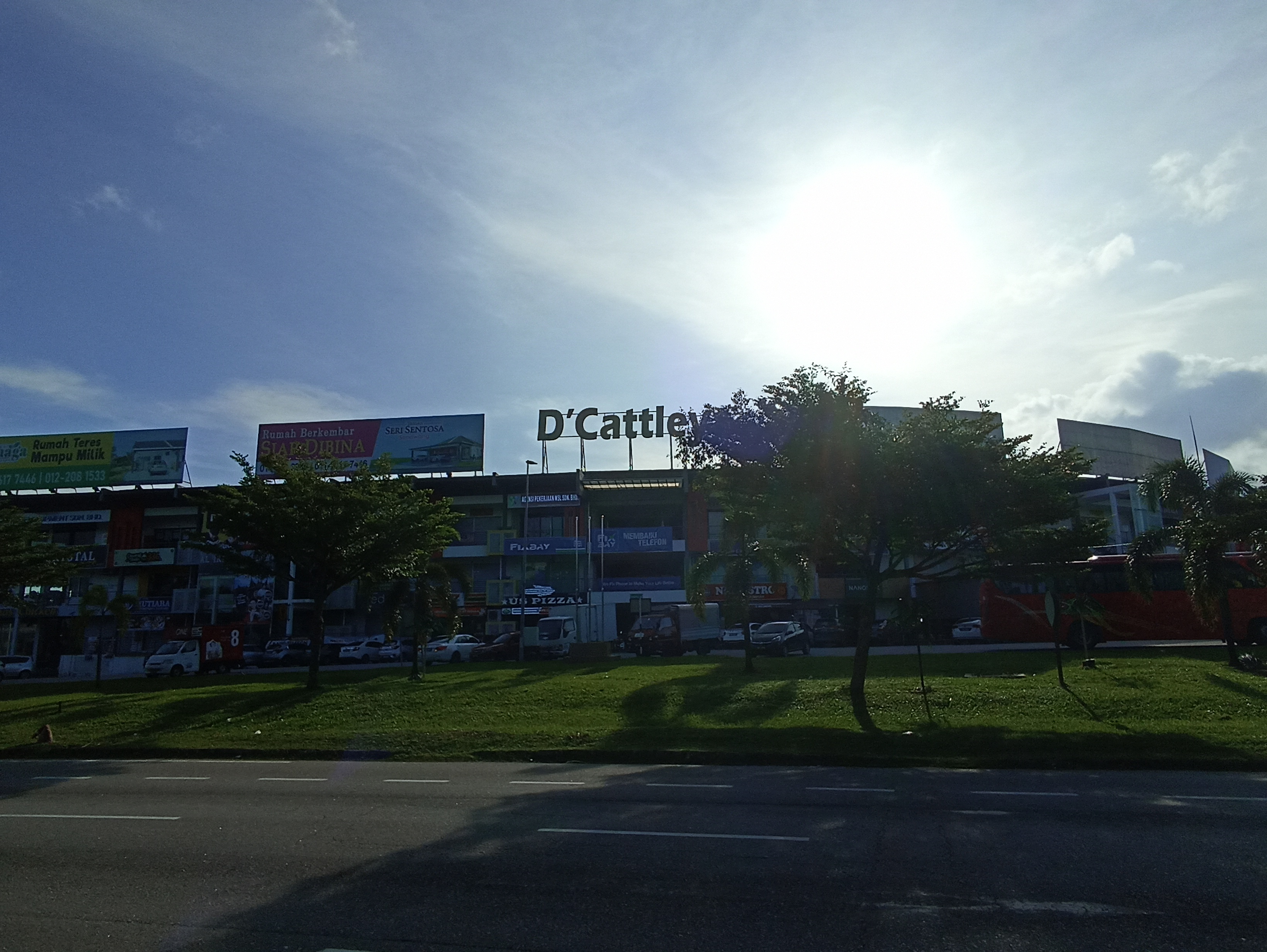
D'Cattleya Retail Centre

==== Bandar Prima Senawang ====
A relatively new retail centre, just adjacent to Senawang Commercial Centre. The centrepiece of Bandar Prima Senawang is a Mydin mall.

== Infrastructures ==
=== Transportation ===
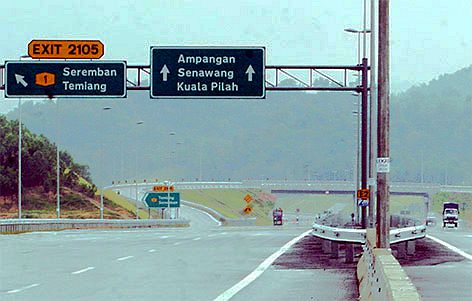
A section of the Kajang–Seremban Highway, near Temiang. Senawang is the southern terminus of the highway.

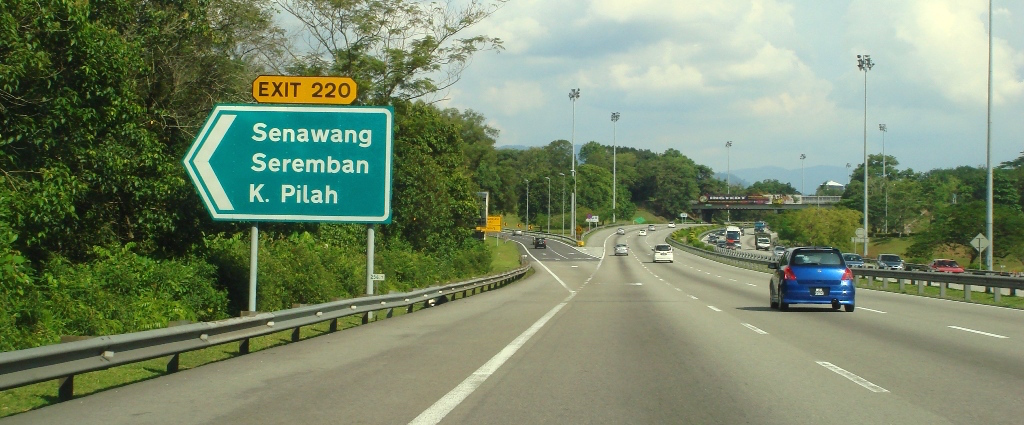
Senawang Interchange, North–South Expressway Southern Route.

Senawang has connected interchanges with the North–South Expressway, Seremban–Port Dickson Highway, a highway that connects Seremban district and Port Dickson district, both are districts of Negeri Sembilan and Kajang–Seremban Highway, (Malay: Lebuhraya Kajang- Seremban), or LEKAS Highway that connects the states of Negeri Sembilan and Selangor.

KTM Komuter has extended commuter service to Senawang. The 8.5 km (5.3 mi) extension commuter services is from Seremban to Senawang and Sungai Gadut, Negeri Sembilan. Completed in 2011, it was part of the Seremban-Gemas line.

Indian company IRCON International was awarded the project to build and upgrade the 98 km stretch between Seremban and Gemas. The project had been divided into two phases – Seremban–Sg Gadut (11.3 km) and Sg Gadut–Gemas (86.8 km).

Senawang is also served by Senawang and Sungai Gadut stations on the KTM Komuter Seremban Line.

=== Education ===
There are 8 national schools in Senawang consist of 5 primary schools and 3 secondary schools. Primary schools in Senawang are:

- SK Senawang
- SK Lavender Heights
- SK Senawang 3
- SK Sri Mawar
- SK Seri Pagi

Secondary Schools in Senawang are:

- SMK Senawang
- SMK Seri Pagi
- SMK Taman Forest Height

Also, there are two private Islamic schools in Senawang:

- Sekolah Rendah Islam As-Saadiyah
- Sekolah Tinggi Islam As-Sofa

While there are plenty of kindergartens and tuition ran by the locals.

=== Health ===
The two major healthcare centres in Senawang is a government-owned Senawang Health Clinic at Persiaran Senawang and a privately owned SALAM Senawang Specialist Hospital at Lavender Heights Business Centre

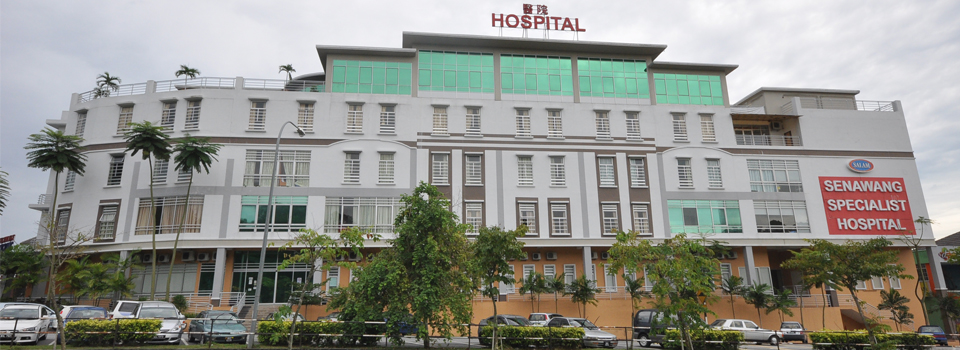
SALAM Senawang Specialist Hospital

SALAM Senawang is a 105-bed hospital providing medical, surgical, and consultative services in Senawang and surrounding areas. It also operates a 24-hour emergency department to provide emergency medical care outside regular service hours.

Another is a private maternity hospital, Hospital Bersalin Sukhilmi at Taman Bandar Senawang

== In popular culture ==
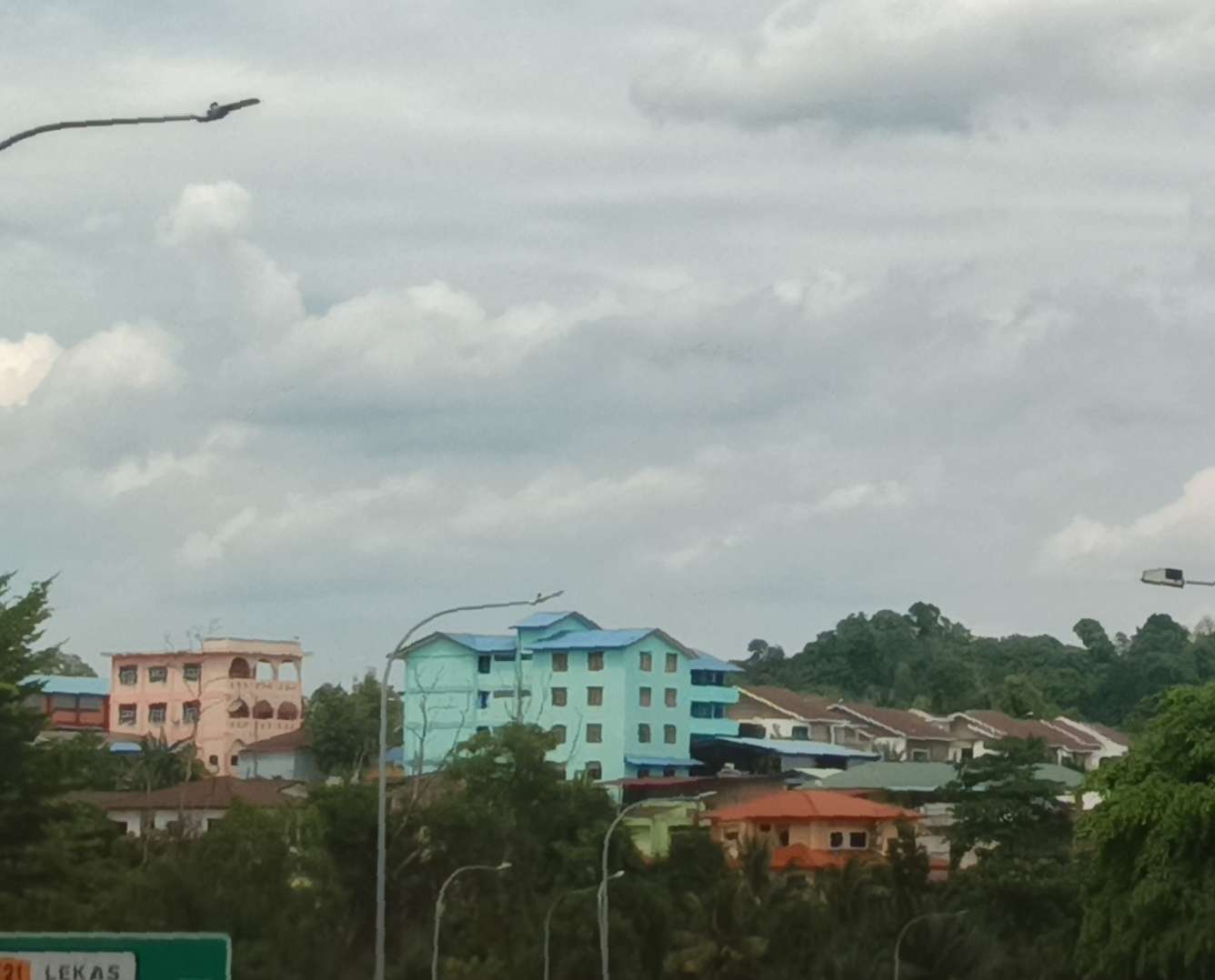
Taman Rashidah Utama

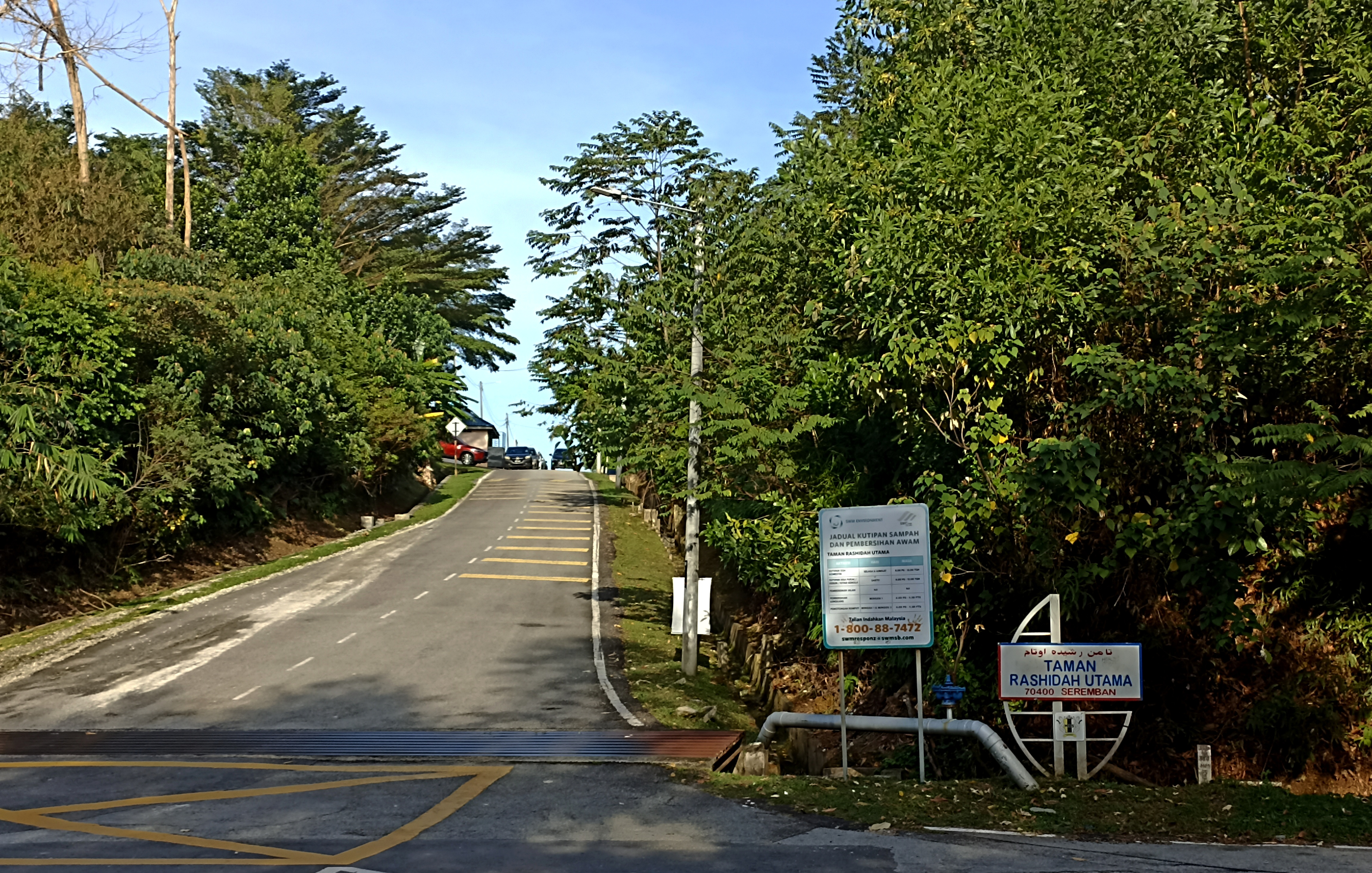
Taman Rashidah Utama junction, off Jalan Senawang–Paroi

Taman Rashidah Utama, one of the neighbourhoods around Senawang, holds significance in the Malaysian rock scene, as it was immortalized in a similarly-titled song by renowned rock kapak band Wings. The song remains one of the band's most timeless pieces, which has been subjected to covering in numerous jamming and karaoke sessions.
