= Rahang =

Malaysian suburb

Rahang is a suburb of Seremban in Negeri Sembilan, Malaysia. It is an industrial and business area.

== Education ==
- Sekolah Menengah Kebangsaan Bukit Mewah
