= KTM West Coast railway line =

Railway line in Malaysia

KTM West Coast Line
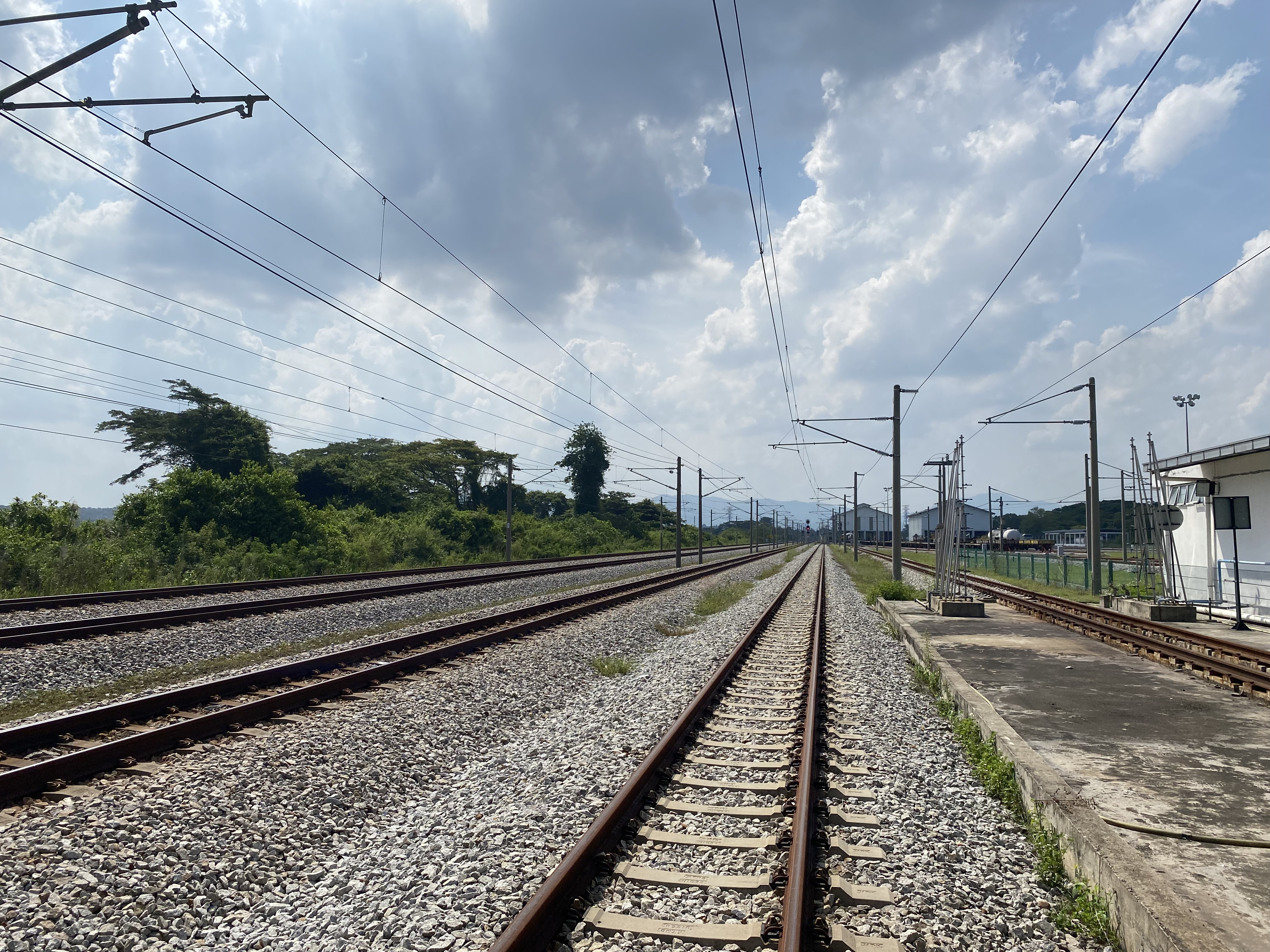
- KTM West Coast Line at Batu Gajah Railway Depot

Overview
- Native name: Landasan Keretapi KTM Pantai Barat (Malay); மலாயா மேற்கு கடற்கரை தொடருந்து வழித்தடம் (Tamil); 西海岸铁路线 (Chinese)
- Status: Operational
- Owner: Keretapi Tanah Melayu
- Locale: Peninsular Malaysia & Singapore
- Termini: Padang Besar; Woodlands Train Checkpoint
- Continues from: Padang Besar Branch
- Stations: 121

Service
- Type: Higher-speed rail; Inter-city rail; Commuter rail; Freight rail
- Services: KTM Intercity; KTM Komuter; KTM ETS; KTM Kargo
- Operator: Keretapi Tanah Melayu
- Depots: Padang Besar; Bukit Mertajam; Bukit Tengah; Batu Gajah; Rawang; Sentul; KL Sentral; Seremban; Klang; Gemas; Kempas Baru

History
- Opened: 1 June 1885
- Completed: 17 September 1923
- Closed: 2 May 1932 (Bukit Timah–Pasir Panjang); 1 July 2011 (Woodlands–Tanjong Pagar)

Technical
- Line length: 1,203.7 km (747.9 mi)
- Number of tracks: 1 or 2
- Track gauge: 1,000 mm (3 ft 3 3/8 in) metre gauge
- Electrification: 25 kV 50 Hz AC overhead catenary
- Operating speed: 140 km/h (87 mph)

The KTM West Coast railway line is a main railway line in Malaysia. It runs from Padang Besar close to the Malaysia–Thailand border in Perlis (where it connects with the State Railway of Thailand) to the Woodlands Train Checkpoint in Singapore, running near parallel to the west coast and serving the west coast states of Peninsular Malaysia. The line is owned and used entirely by Keretapi Tanah Melayu (KTM). Past Padang Besar, the line continues on to become the Thai Southern Line, which continues up towards Hat Yai and Bangkok.

The 1,203.7 - kilometre line is busier than its east coast counterpart, the East Coast railway line since it is double-tracked and electrified for most of its route and has more services. The line handles a variety of passenger train services such as KTM ETS services, KTM Intercity services, State Railway of Thailand International Express services, KTM Komuter services within the Klang Valley, the George Town Conurbation and the Johor Bahru Conurbation, and freight trains. The entire line that is used for passenger services, except the Singapore section and the Pasir Gudang branch line, is fully double-tracked and electrified.

Major stations on the line include Kuala Lumpur Sentral, Padang Besar, Butterworth, Ipoh, Gemas, Johor Bahru Sentral, and the Woodlands Train Checkpoint in Singapore.

== History ==
The West Coast railway line was developed in stretches on 1 June 1885, with the opening of the Taiping–Port Weld Line, and 1932 when the line opened up to Tanjung Pagar, thus spanning the entire west coast of Peninsular Malaysia from Padang Besar on the Malaysia–Thai border to Singapore. The line began with the construction of branches linking coastal ports with inland tin mining areas before they were gradually linked up by the main truck line running through the interior of the West Coast states of Peninsular Malaysia.

The latest new lines to be built were the branch lines to West Port, North Port, Tanjung Pelepas, Pasir Gudang and the North Butterworth Container Terminal at the Port of Penang. The trunk line had also seen sections becoming disused, abandoned or even removed, with the latest being the closure and subsequent removal of the southernmost stretch of track between the Woodlands Train Checkpoint and Tanjong Pagar in 2011.

=== Timeline ===
- 6 May 1890: Taiping – Kamunting
- 1 July 1892: Kamunting – Ulu Sepetang
- 7 November 1892: Kuala Lumpur – Rawang
- 1 June 1893: Kuala Lumpur – Pudu
- 10 July 1893: Rawang – Serendah
- 6 September 1893: Sungkai – Tapah Road
- 17 October 1893: Batu Gajah – Ipoh
- 27 April 1894: Kota Bharu – Batu Gajah
- 29 September 1894: Tapah Road – Talam
- 6 October 1894: Serendah – Kuala Kubu Bharu
- 1 March 1895: Pudu – Sungai Besi
- 18 March 1895: Talam – Kampar
- 1 May 1895: Kampar – Kota Bharu
- 1 June 1896: Ipoh – Tanjong Rambutan
- 27 November 1896: Tanjong Rambutan – Chemor
- 14 August 1897: Sungai Besi – Kajang
- 5 July 1897: Chemor – Sungai Siput
- 1 July 1898: Sungai Siput – Enggor
- 1 July 1899: Prai – Bukit Mertajam
- 1 September 1899: Ulu Sepetang – Pondok Tanjong
- 1 November 1899: Krian River – Bagan Serai
- 1 August 1900: Kuala Kubu Bharu – Kalumpang
- 1 September 1900: Bukit Mertajam – Nibong Tebal
- 15 September 1900: Enggor – Kuala Kangsar
- 1 November 1900: Kalumpang – Tanjung Malim
- 1 May 1901: Bagan Serai – Alor Pongsu
- 1 July 1901: Kuala Kangsar – Padang Rengas
- 1 February 1902: Alor Pongsu – Pondok Tanjong
- 1 May 1902: Taiping – Bukit Gantang
- 1 May 1902: Nibong Tebal – Krian River
- 14 June 1902: Kajang – Bangi
- 1 February 1903: Bangi – Batang Benar
- 2 April 1903: Batang Benar – Seremban
- 15 July 1903: Bukit Gantang – Padang Rengas
- 15 July 1903: Slim River – Tanjung Malim
- 15 August 1903: Sungkai – Slim River
- 15 July 1905: Seremban – Tampin
- 1 October 1906: Tampin – Gemas
- 1 March 1908: Gemas – Segamat
- 1 July 1909: Segamat – Johore Bahru
- 19 October 1914: Bukit Mertajam – Pinang Tunggal
- 1 March 1915: Pinang Tunggal – Gurun
- 4 October 1915: Gurun – Alor Star
- 15 October 1917: Alor Setar – Bukit Ketri
- 1 March 1918: Bukit Ketri – Padang Besar
- 17 September 1923: Johore Bahru – Woodlands

== Services ==
The West Coast railway line is served by a variety of train services:

- KTM Intercity
  - Ekspres Rakyat Timuran between Tumpat and JB Sentral.
    - The route between Gemas and JB Sentral is part of the West Coast Line while the route between Gemas and Tumpat is on the East Coast Line)
  - Shuttle Timur at Gemas (train services to Kuala Lipis on the East Coast Line)
  - Shuttle Tebrau between JB Sentral and Woodlands Train Checkpoint
- KTM ETS
  - ETS Express (express service that only stops at fewer main stations, on routes traveling beyond Ipoh, one of 6 coaches upgraded to business class with free wifi, charging sockets, on board dining & single seats)
    - Between KL Sentral and Ipoh
    - Between KL Sentral and Butterworth
    - Between KL Sentral and Padang Besar
  - ETS Platinum (express service that only stops at major stations, one of 6 coaches upgraded to business class with free wifi, charging sockets, on board dining & single seats)
    - Between KL Sentral and Butterworth
    - Between KL Sentral and Padang Besar
    - Between JB Sentral and KL Sentral
    - Between JB Sentral and Padang Besar
    - Between JB Sentral and Butterworth
  - ETS Gold (stops at all major stations and a few minor stations)
    - Between KL Sentral and Ipoh
    - Between Segamat and Butterworth
    - Between JB Sentral and Padang Besar
- KTM Komuter
  - 1 Batu Caves–Pulau Sebang Line between Batu Caves and Pulau Sebang/Tampin.
  - 2 Tanjung Malim–Port Klang Line between Tanjung Malim and Port Klang.
  - ~~10 KL Sentral–Terminal Skypark Line between KL Sentral and Terminal Skypark.~~ (suspended due to low ridership)
  - 1 Butterworth–Ipoh Line between Butterworth and Ipoh.
  - 2 Padang Besar–Butterworth Line between Padang Besar and Butterworth.
  - 1 Paloh–JB Sentral Line between Paloh and JB Sentral
  - 2 Kempas Baru–Pasir Gudang Line between Kempas Baru and Pasir Gudang
- International Express between Padang Besar and Bangkok's Krung Thep Aphiwat Central Terminal

=== Former services ===
- KTM Intercity
  - Ekspres Selatan between Gemas and JB Sentral (terminated on 1 January 2026 following full deployment of ETS services on this route)
- KTM ETS
  - ETS Silver between KL Sentral and Ipoh (terminated temporarily on 1 January 2026)

== Projects ==
=== Klang Valley Double Track Project ===
The project was implemented by KTM to rehabilitate and upgrade the signalling system, electrification and tracks of the railway in the Klang Valley region, which are the oldest double-tracked and electrified railway in the country. The project began in 2016. Phase 1 of the KVDT, which entails the rehabilitation of 42 km of tracks between Rawang and Salak Selatan, as well as between Sentul and Batu Junction, while projected to be completed in 2021, was only completed in 2025. It was projected that once complete, train frequencies will be reduced to just seven-and-a-half minutes.

Phase 2 of the KVDT, which began in 2023, will cover the sections from Port Klang/Bangsar Junction to Port Klang, and from Salak Selatan to Seremban. It is schedueled to be completed by 2027.

== Line network ==
Route of KTM West Coast railway line. Static map of all rail lines.

=== Main trunk line ===
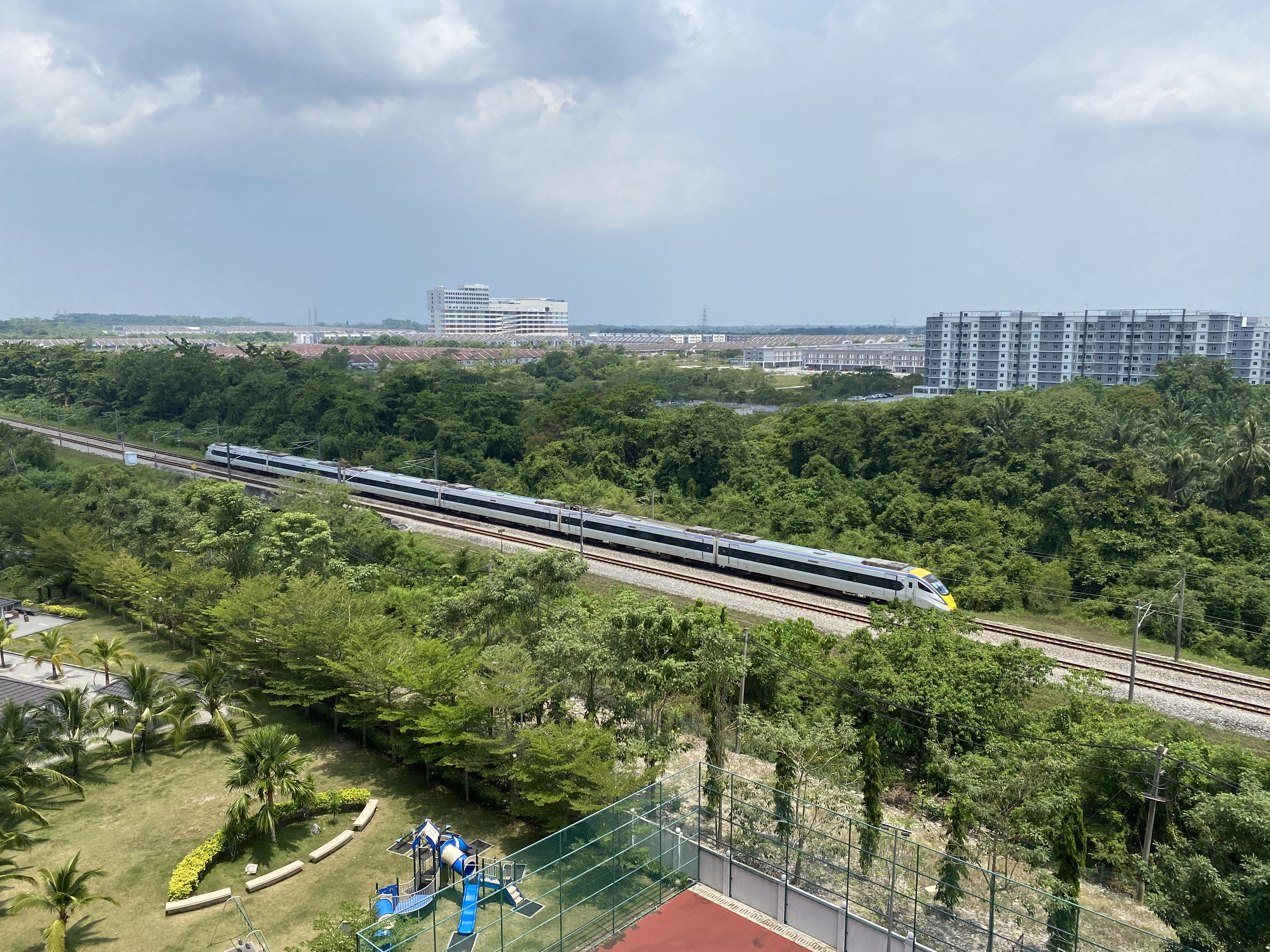
Part of the main trunk line near Kampar

The West Coast main trunk line stretches from Padang Besar on the Malaysia–Thailand border to the Woodlands Train Checkpoint in Singapore.

The main trunk line is double-tracked and electrified from Padang Besar to JB Sentral. The line between JB Sentral and the Woodlands Train Checkpoint remains single-tracked and not electrified and will be decommissioned once the termination of the Shuttle Tebrau services and the opening of the RTS Link in 2027.

The West Coast railway line connects with the State Railway of Thailand at Padang Besar, while the East Coast Line branches off at Gemas.

=== Branch lines ===
The West Coast railway line includes several branch lines from the main trunk line, namely:

- Bukit Mertajam Junction to Butterworth and the North Butterworh Container Terminal (NBCT)
- Batu Junction to Batu Caves
- Port Klang/Bangsar Junction to Port Klang and West Port, with further branch lines:
  - Subang Jaya to Terminal Skypark at the Sultan Abdul Aziz Shah (Subang) Airport
  - Port Klang to Northport
  - Pulau Indah to various West Port shipping terminals
- Skudai Junction to the Port of Tanjung Pelepas
- Pasir Gudang Junction to Pasir Gudang and Johor Port

The Bukit Mertajam Junction to Butterworth, Batu Junction to Batu Caves, Port Klang Junction to Port Klang station, as well as the branch line to Terminal Skypark are double-tracked and electrified.

The line from Port Klang to Westport and its shipping terminals, Butterworth to the NBCT, Skudai Junction to the Port of Tanjung Pelepas, as well Pasir Gudang Junction to Pasir Gudang and Johor Port are single lines and not electrified.

There are also branch lines where most or only a few tracks exist but are currently not used for any service, closed or dismantled are:

- Between Taiping and Port Weld
- Between Tapah Road and Teluk Intan (abandoned and not connected to the main line)
- Between Kuang, Batu Arang and Batang Berjuntai
- Between Connaught Bridge Junction, Klang Utara and Kuala Selangor
- Between Seremban and Port Dickson
- Between Tasek and Tanjung Rambutan (abandoned after double tracking, and not connected to the new main line, never used and meant as branch line compared to Teluk Intan branch line)
- Between Pulau Sebang/Tampin and Malacca City (abandoned since the Japanese invasion of Malaya, most of the tracks were removed and repurposed for the Burma Railway)
- Singapore–Kranji branch line, between Bukit Timah and Pasir Panjang

None of these disused branch lines are double tracked nor electrified.

=== Stations ===
==== Main Trunk Line ====
Station names	Cities, Towns, Landmarks served	Territory	Cumulative distance (km)	Services	Remarks
(Connects to Padang Besar branch line, Southern Line, Thailand)
Padang Besar	Padang Besar	Perlis	0.0	ETS 2	Padang Besar Immigration, Customs, Quarantine and Security (ICQS) Complex
Bukit Ketri	Bukit Ketri	Perlis	19.0	2	
Arau	Arau; Kuala Perlis; Pulau Langkawi; MARA University of Technology's (UiTM) Arau Campus; University of Malaysia Perlis (UniMAP); Northern University of Malaysia (UUM)	Perlis	29.4	ETS 2	
Kodiang	Kodiang; Megat Dewa	Kedah	37.5	2	
Anak Bukit	Anak Bukit; Jitra Kepala Batas	Kedah	60.0	ETS 2	Connects to Sultan Abdul Halim Airport
Alor Setar	Alor Setar	Kedah	68.2	ETS 2	
Kobah	Pendang	Kedah	85.8	2	
Gurun	Gurun	Kedah	103.1	ETS 2	
Sungai Petani	Sungai Petani	Kedah	124.5	ETS 2	
Tasek Gelugor	Tasek Gelugor; Padang Serai	Penang	142.5	ETS 2	
Simpang Ampat	Simpang Ampat	Penang	165.7	1	
Nibong Tebal	Nibong Tebal; University of Science Malaysia's Engineering Campus (KKUSM)	Penang	179.1	ETS 1	
Parit Buntar	Parit Buntar	Perak	185.4	ETS 1	
Bagan Serai	Bagan Serai; Alor Pongsu	Perak	195.8	ETS 1	
Kamunting	Kamunting	Perak	234.1	1	
Taiping	Taiping	Perak	239.4	ETS 1	
Padang Rengas	Padang Rengas	Perak	258.9	1	
Kuala Kangsar	Kuala Kangsar	Perak	267.6	ETS 1	
Sungai Siput	Sungai Siput	Perak	288.8	ETS 1	
Chemor		Perak			Closed and demolished. Freights only
Tasek	Ipoh	Perak	312.0		Currently not in use
Ipoh	Ipoh	Perak	326.1	ETS 1	Connects to Sultan Azlan Shah Airport
Lahat	Lahat; Simpang Pulai	Perak	332.6		Freights only
Batu Gajah	Batu Gajah	Perak	340.1	ETS	
Kota Bharu	Gopeng	Perak	346.1		Freights only
Kampar	Kampar; Tunku Abdul Rahman University's (UTAR) Kampar Campus	Perak	363.1	ETS	
Tapah Road	Tapah Road; Tapah; Cameron Highlands	Perak	378.6	ETS	
Sungkai	Sungkai	Perak	402.6	ETS	
Slim River	Slim River	Perak	426.8	ETS	
Behrang	Behrang	Perak	438.1		Currently not in use
Tanjung Malim	Tanjung Malim; Sultan Idris Education University (UPSI)	Perak	445.6	ETS 2	
Kuala Kubu Bharu	Kuala Kubu Bharu	Selangor	467.7	2	
Rasa	Rasa	Selangor	478.5	2	
Batang Kali	Batang Kali	Selangor	480.8	ETS 2	Replaced the nearby former station Ulu Yam.
Serendah	Serendah	Selangor	492.2	2	
Rawang	Rawang	Selangor	500.6	ETS 2	
Kuang	Kuang	Selangor		2	
Sungai Buloh	Sungai Buloh	Selangor	514.9	ETS 2 Interchange: 12	
Kepong Sentral	Kepong; Bandar Sri Damansara	Selangor	520.7	ETS 2 Interchange: 12	
Kepong	Kepong	Kuala Lumpur		2	
Segambut Utara	Segambut; Jinjang Selatan	Kuala Lumpur		2	
Segambut	Segambut	Kuala Lumpur		2	
Putra	Kuala Lumpur (city centre)	Kuala Lumpur		1 2 Interchange: 3 4	Replaced the nearby former station The Mall
Bank Negara	Kuala Lumpur (city centre)	Kuala Lumpur		1 2 Interchange: 3 4	Replaced the nearby former station JPM
Kuala Lumpur	Kuala Lumpur (city centre)	Kuala Lumpur	532.6	ETS 1 2 Interchange: 5 9	
Kuala Lumpur Sentral	Kuala Lumpur (city centre); Brickfields	Kuala Lumpur	533.6	ETS 1 2 Interchange: 5 6 7 8 9 10	Central interchange for intercity and commuter trains, rapid transit, monorail and airport rail links
Mid Valley	Mid Valley City	Kuala Lumpur		1 Interchange: 2 5	
Seputeh	Seputeh	Kuala Lumpur		1	
Salak Selatan	Salak South	Kuala Lumpur		1	
Bandar Tasik Selatan	Bandar Tasik Selatan; Bandar Tun Razak; Southern Integrated Terminal (TBS)	Kuala Lumpur	542.8	ETS 1 Interchange: 4 7	
Serdang	Seri Kembangan	Selangor		1	
Kajang	Kajang	Selangor	559.8	ETS 1 Interchange: 9	
Kajang 2	Kajang 2 Bandar Baru Bangi	Selangor		1	
UKM	Bangi Lama; National University of Malaysia (UKM)	Selangor		1	
Bangi	Bangi Lama	Selangor		1	
Batang Benar	Batang Benar	Negeri Sembilan		1	
Nilai	Nilai	Negeri Sembilan	584.8	1	
Labu	Labu	Negeri Sembilan		1	
Tiroi	Tiroi	Negeri Sembilan		1	
Seremban	Seremban; Kuala Pilah; Port Dickson	Negeri Sembilan	605.9	ETS 1	
Senawang	Senawang	Negeri Sembilan		1	
Sungai Gadut	Sungai Gadut	Negeri Sembilan		1	
Rembau	Rembau	Negeri Sembilan	629.6	1	
Pulau Sebang/Tampin	Pulau Sebang; Malacca City; Alor Gajah; Tampin	Malacca	655.1	ETS 1	Main station serving Malacca
Batang Melaka	Batang Melaka; Jasin	Malacca	680.6	ETS	
Gemas	Gemas	Negeri Sembilan	707.6	ETS	Interchange with East Coast railway line
Segamat	Segamat; Muar; Tangkak	Johor	733.6	ETS	
Genuang	Genuang	Johor	742.1		Freights only
Tenang	Tenang	Johor			Closed
Labis	Labis	Johor	763.1	ETS	
Bekok	Bekok	Johor	779.0	ETS	
Paloh	Paloh	Johor	792.9	ETS 1	
Chamek	Chamek	Johor			Closed
Kluang	Kluang; Batu Pahat; Mersing	Johor	816.6	ETS 1	
Mengkibol	Mengkibol	Johor	823.3		Freights only
Rengam	Renggam	Johor	835.3	ETS 1	
Layang-Layang	Layang-Layang	Johor	848.2	ETS 1	
Kulai	Kulai; Pontian	Johor	871.5	ETS 1	Connects to Senai International Airport
Skudai/Senai	Skudai	Johor			Freights only
Tanjung Pelepas	Iskandar Puteri; Port of Tanjung Pelepas	Johor			Freights only
Kempas Baru	Kempas	Johor	892.4	ETS 1 2	
Johor Bahru Sentral	Johor Bahru; Kota Tinggi; Pontian; Southern Integrated Gateway	Johor	903.0	ETS 1 (Shuttle Tebrau)	
Woodlands Train Checkpoint	Woodlands	Singapore	905.1	(Shuttle Tebrau only)	Shuttle Tebrau services only
Bukit Timah	Bukit Timah	Singapore			Closed
Tanjong Pagar	Tanjong Pagar	Singapore			Closed

==== Batu Junction–Batu Caves Branch Line ====
Station names	Cities, Towns, Landmarks served	Territory	Cumulative distance (km)	Services	Remarks
Batu Junction between Segambut and Putra stations (Continue to main West Coast Line)
Sentul	Sentul	Kuala Lumpur		1	
Batu Kentonmen	Batu Kentonmen; Jalan Ipoh	Kuala Lumpur		1	Replaced the nearby former station Jalan Ipoh
Kampung Batu	Bandar Baru Selayang; Kampung Batu	Kuala Lumpur		1 Interchange: 12	
Taman Wahyu	Taman Wahyu	Kuala Lumpur		1	
Batu Caves	Batu Caves	Selangor		1	

==== Port Klang Junction–Port Klang Branch Line ====
Station names	Cities, Towns, Landmarks served	Territory	Cumulative distance (km)	Services	Remarks
Port Klang (Bangsar) Junction between KL Sentral and Mid Valley stations (Continue to main West Coast Line)
Abdullah Hukum	Kampung Haji Abdullah Hukum; Bangsar; KL Eco City; Mid Valley City	Kuala Lumpur		2 Interchange: 1 5	Replaced the nearby former station Taman Ghazali
Angkasapuri	Angkasapuri	Kuala Lumpur		2	
Pantai Dalam	Pantai Dalam	Kuala Lumpur		2	
Petaling	Kampung Pasir; Jalan Klang Lama; Taman OUG	Kuala Lumpur		2	
Jalan Templer	Jalan Templer and Petaling Jaya	Selangor		2	
Kampung Dato Harun	Kampung Dato Harun	Selangor		2	
Seri Setia	Seri Setia; Sungai Way	Selangor		2	Formerly known as Guinness
Setia Jaya	Sungai Way; Bandar Sunway	Selangor		2 Interchange: B1	
Subang Jaya	Subang Jaya	Selangor		2 10 Interchange: 5	
Terminal Skypark	Subang; Sultan Abdul Aziz Shah Airport	Selangor		10	
Batu Tiga	Batu Tiga	Selangor		2	
Shah Alam	Shah Alam	Selangor		2	
Padang Jawa	Padang Jawa i-City; UiTM	Selangor		2	
Bukit Badak	Jalan Bukit Badak, Klang	Selangor		2	
Klang	Klang (city centre)	Selangor		2	
Teluk Pulai	Teluk Pulai	Selangor		2	
Teluk Gadong	Teluk Gadong	Selangor		2	
Kampung Raja Uda	Kampung Raja Uda	Selangor		2	
Jalan Kastam	Jalan Kastam, Port Klang	Selangor		2	
Port Klang	Port Klang	Selangor		2	
(Continue to West Port)

==== Bukit Mertajam Junction–Butterworth Branch Line ====
Station names	Cities, Towns, Landmarks served	Territory	Cumulative distance (km)	Services	Remarks
Bukit Mertajam Junction between Simpang Ampat and Tasek Gelugor stations (Continue to main West Coast Line)
Bukit Mertajam	Bukit Mertajam; Kulim	Penang	155.3 (Note: Along southern main line towards Ipoh.) / 147.6 (Note: Along northern main line towards Padang Besar.)	ETS 1 2	Main interchange station between KTM Komuter Northern Sector lines
Bukit Tengah	Bukit Tengah	Penang	152.3 / 150.6	1 2	
Perai	Perai	Penang			Freights only
Butterworth	Butterworth; Penang Bridge; Penang Sentral; Port of Penang	Penang	145.1 / 157.8	ETS 1 2	Interchange with Penang Sentral, Penang Ferry and LRT Mutiara Line
(Continue to North Butterworth Container Terminal in Port of Penang)

==== Pasir Gudang Junction–Pasir Gudang Branch Line ====
Station names	Cities, Towns, Landmarks served	Territory	Cumulative distance (km)	Services	Remarks
Pasir Gudang Junction between Kempas Baru and JB Sentral stations (Continue to main West Coast Line)
Pasir Gudang	Pasir Gudang; Johor Port	Johor		2	
(Continue to Johor Port)

== See also ==
- Keretapi Tanah Melayu
  - KTM Intercity and KTM ETS
    - KTM West Coast railway line
    - KTM East Coast railway line
  - KTM Komuter
    - Batu Caves–Pulau Sebang Line
    - Tanjung Malim–Port Klang Line
    - KL Sentral–Terminal Skypark Line
    - Padang Besar–Butterworth Line
    - Butterworth–Ipoh Line
    - Paloh–JB Sentral Line
    - Kempas Baru–Pasir Gudang Line
- Rail transport in Malaysia
- Railway electrification in Malaysia
- Public transport in Kuala Lumpur
- Johor Bahru–Singapore Rapid Transit System
- Southern Line (Thailand)
