= Seri Setia Komuter station =

Railway station in Selangor, Malaysia

Seri Setia

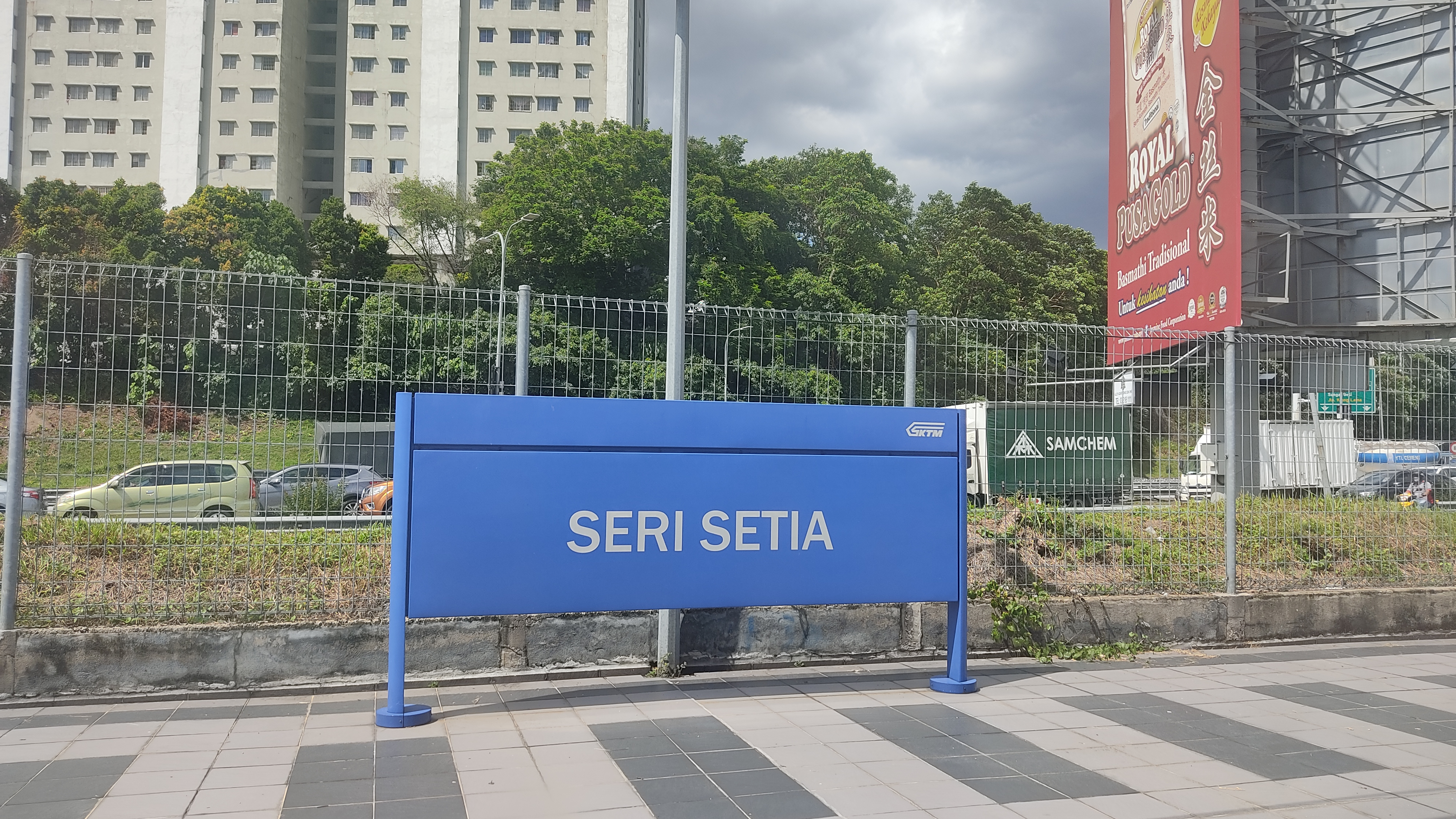

General information
- Other names: Malay: سري ستيا (Jawi); Chinese: 斯里斯迪亚; Tamil: செரி செத்தியா
- Location: Seri Setia, 47000 Petaling Jaya, Selangor; Malaysia
- System: KD07 | Commuter rail station
- Owner: Keretapi Tanah Melayu
- Line: Port Klang Branch
- Platforms: 2 side platform
- Tracks: 2

Construction
- Structure type: At-grade
- Parking: Available

Other information
- Station code: KD07

History
- Opened: 1995
- Former names: Guinness

Services
Preceding station	Keretapi Tanah Melayu (Komuter)	Following station
Kampung Dato Harun towards Tanjung Malim	Tanjung Malim–Port Klang Line	Setia Jaya towards Port Klang

Former services
Sentul - Kuala Lumpur - Port Klang Railbus
Preceding station	Keretapi Tanah Melayu	Following station
Sungai Way towards Port Klang	North–South Line	Kampung Dato Harun towards Sentul
Location

The Seri Setia Komuter station is a commuter train station located nearby Sungai Way, Petaling Jaya, Selangor, and served by the Port Klang Line of the KTM Komuter service and the former Sentul-Kuala Lumpur-Port Klang Railbus Line.

== Name ==
The station was formerly a freight station named Guinness Station in the 1980s, it was named after the Guinness brewery located adjacent to the station, while nowadays "Seri Setia" originate from nearby new village - Sungai Way's official name, Seri Setia New Village. Therefore, there is a link bridge from this station to Sungai Way village across the Federal Highway.

== Gallery ==
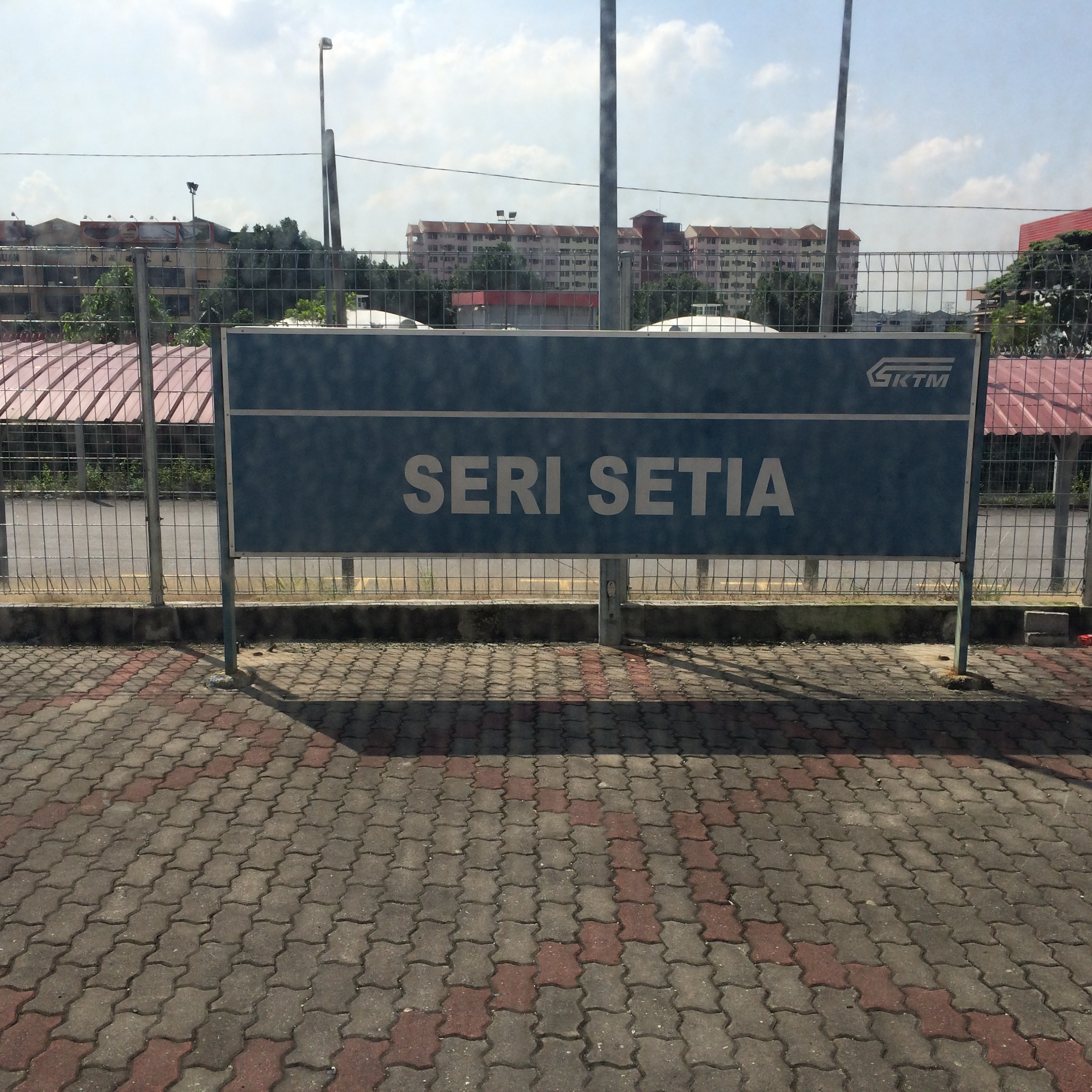
Seri Setia signboard (2014)

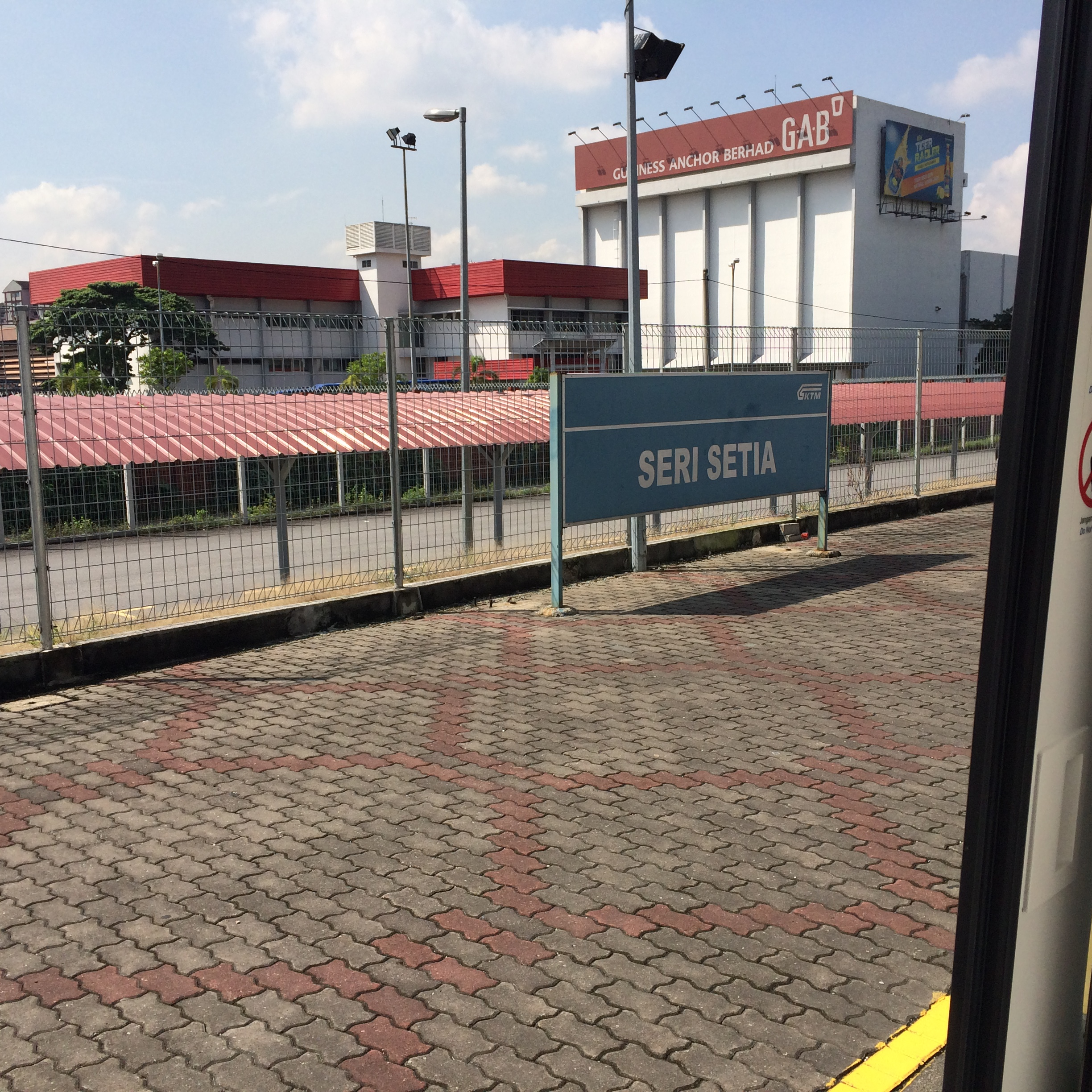
Seri Setia Komuter station with the Guinness Anchor factory in the background
