= Tanjung Rambutan railway station =

Railway station in Malaysia

Coordinates: 4°40′19″N 101°9′22″E

Tanjung Rambutan

General information
- Location: Jalan Stesyen, Kampung Masjid, Tanjung Rambutan; Perak; Malaysia
- Owner: Keretapi Tanah Melayu
- Platforms: 1 side platform
- Tracks: 3

Construction
- Parking: Available, free.
- Accessible: Y

Other information
- Status: Defunct

Former services
Preceding station	Keretapi Tanah Melayu	Following station
Chemor towards Padang Besar	West Coast Line	Tasek towards Woodlands
Location

The Tanjung Rambutan railway station is a defunct Malaysian train station located at and named after the Tanjung Rambutan, Kinta District, Perak.

After the station was closed, the station now functions as a food court.
