= Tanjung Rambutan =

- Town
- Location in Perak Location in Malaysia
- Coordinates: 4°42′35″N 101°08′00″E
- Country: Malaysia
- State: Perak

Government
  - Type: Council government
  - Yang berhormat: Muhammad arafat (Pakatan harapan)
- Time zone: UTC+8 (MST)

Tanjung Rambutan (Jawi: تنجوڠ رمبوتن; Chinese: 丹绒红毛丹) is a small town in Kinta District, Perak, Malaysia. It is on the Ipoh to Butterworth railway line, at the now-defunct Tanjung Rambutan railway station. It is located approximately 12 kilometers from the city of Ipoh and is known for its mental hospital, the Hospital Bahagia Ulu Kinta.

== History ==
Tanjung Rambutan was named after a fruit that grew abundantly in the area. The town was established in the early 19th century by the British colonial government as a settlement for the Malay population. The town later became a hub for rubber and tin mining.

== Geography ==
Tanjung Rambutan is located at an elevation of 60 meters above sea level. The town is situated on the banks of the Kinta River and is surrounded by hills and forests. The town is known for its tropical climate, with temperatures ranging from 22 °C to 32 °C throughout the year.

== Economy ==
The economy of Tanjung Rambutan is primarily based on agriculture, with rubber and palm oil being the main crops grown in the area. The town is also home to several small businesses, including shops and restaurants.

== Culture ==
Tanjung Rambutan is known for its traditional Malay architecture, with many of the buildings in the town featuring intricate wood carvings and other decorative elements. The town also hosts several cultural festivals throughout the year, including the annual Hari Raya Aidilfitri celebration.

== Education ==
Tanjung Rambutan is home to several primary and secondary schools, including the Sekolah Kebangsaan Tanjung Rambutan and the Sekolah Menengah Kebangsaan Tanjung Rambutan.

== Hospital Bahagia Ulu Kinta ==
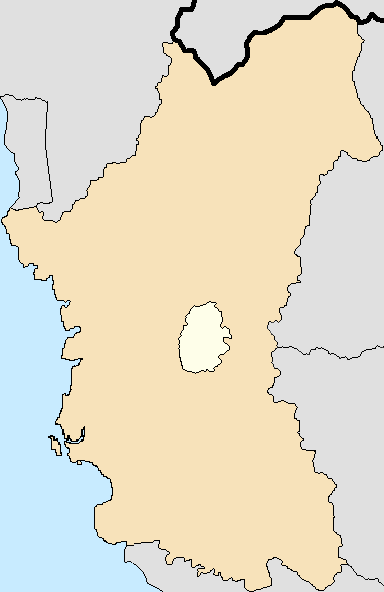
Location of the Tanjung Rambutan Asylum in Malaysia
4.6703°N 101.1655°E

The Hospital Bahagia Ulu Kinta, commonly known as the Tanjung Rambutan Asylum, is a psychiatric hospital located in Tanjung Rambutan. The hospital was established in 1919 by the British colonial government as the Federal Lunatic Asylum, and was later renamed to Hospital Bahagia Ulu Kinta by Mahadevan Mahalingam, the first director of the hospital, in 1965.

The hospital is known for its history of treating patients with mental illness, and is one of the largest psychiatric hospitals in Malaysia. It is situated on a sprawling 161-hectare campus and houses over 1,000 patients. The hospital provides a range of psychiatric services, including counseling, medication, and psychotherapy.
