= Faber =

Faber may refer to:

== People ==
- Faber (surname)

== Companies ==
- Faber & Faber, publishing house in the United Kingdom
- Faber-Castell, German manufacturer of writing instruments
- Faber Music, British sheet music publisher
- Eberhard Faber, German art supply manufacturer best known (in the United States) by their brand of pencil and eraser

== In fiction ==
- Faber College, fictional school providing the setting for the movie National Lampoon's Animal House
- Faber (Fahrenheit 451), character in Ray Bradbury's science fiction novel Fahrenheit 451

== Places ==
- Faber, Virginia, a community in the United States
- Mount Faber, second highest peak in Singapore

== Other uses ==
- Faber, pseudonym of the Italian singer-songwriter Fabrizio De André
- Faber (EP), a 2006 EP by Faber Drive
- Faber (grape), grape variety also known as Faberrebe
- FABER test (Flexion Abduction External Rotation), a test for evidence of hip arthritis
- Faber Towers, landmark in Kuala Lumpur, Malaysia
