= Mengkibol railway halt =

Railway station in Malaysia

Coordinates: 1.9757°N 103.3343°E

Mengkibol

General information
- Other names: Malay: ميڠکيبول (Jawi); Chinese: 明吉摩; Tamil: மெங்கிபோல்
- Location: Mengkibol, Kluang; Johor, Malaysia
- System: KTM Intercity railway halt
- Owner: Keretapi Tanah Melayu
- Line: West Coast Line
- Platforms: 1 side platform
- Tracks: 3

Construction
- Parking: Available
- Accessible: Y

History
- Opened: 1909

Former services
Preceding station	Keretapi Tanah Melayu	Following station
Kluang towards Padang Besar	West Coast Line	Rengam towards Woodlands
Location

The Mengkibol was a Malaysian railway halt located at and named after the town of Mengkibol, Kluang District, Johor. Originally operating as a railway station with a mini side freight godown, it operated as a halt before closure. However, when the Gemas-Johor Bahru double-tracking and electrification project is complete, Mengkibol station will cease passenger services and be re-opened to only serve freight trains.

== See also ==
- Rail transport in Malaysia
