= Taman Desa =

Housing estate in Kuala Lumpur, Malaysia

Coordinates: 3.1032433°N 101.6760681°E

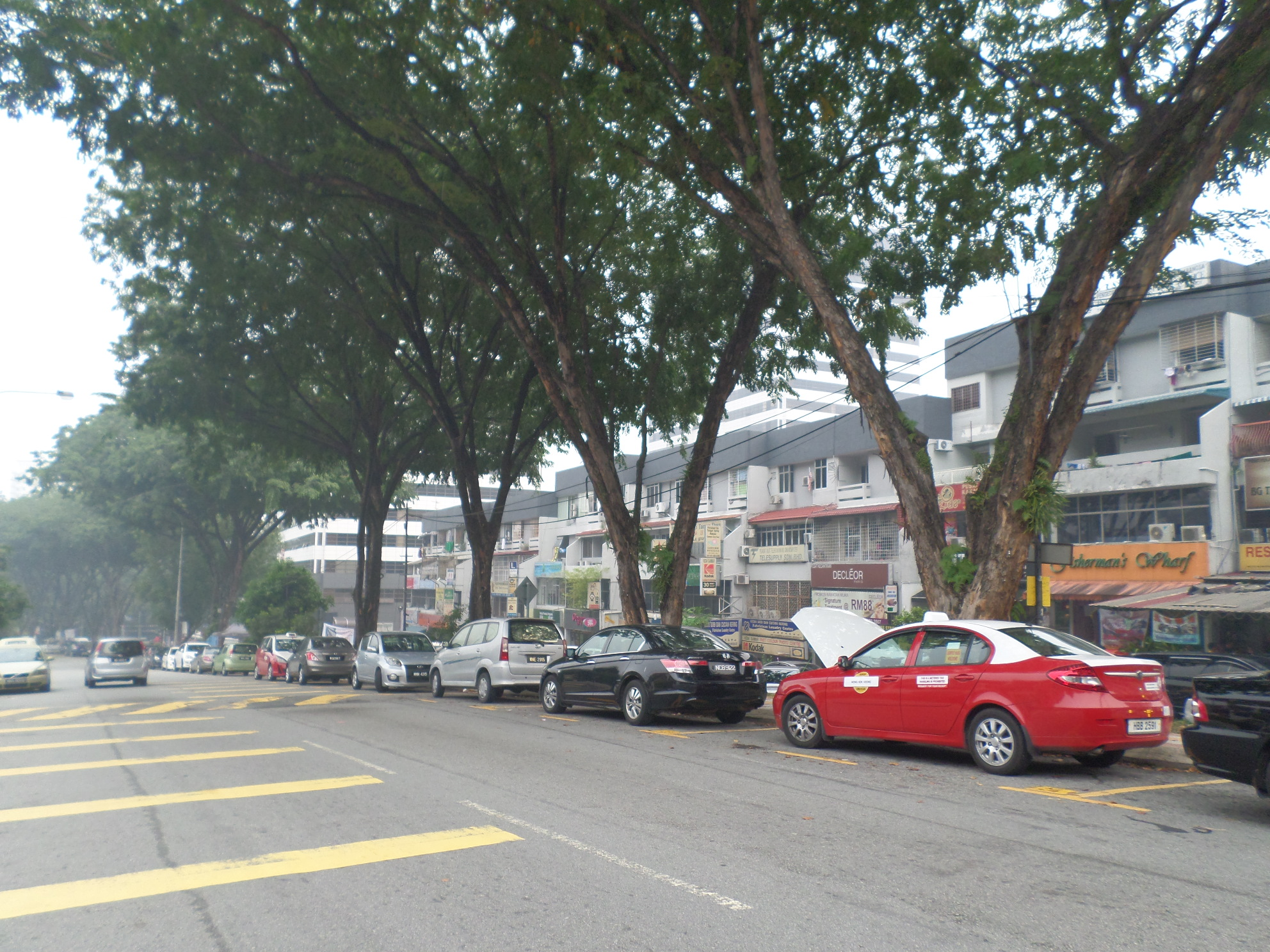

Taman Desa is a housing estate in south-western Kuala Lumpur, Malaysia under the postcode 58100. Located off the East–West Link Expressway and Jalan Klang Lama, Taman Desa falls under the Seputeh parliamentary constituency.

== Features ==
Taman Desa's construction began in the early 1970s. It is located along Old Klang Road, and is in proximity to Taman Seputeh, Pantai Dalam, Mid Valley City and Salak South. Travelling to downtown Kuala Lumpur takes approximately 10 to 15 minutes.

The closest railway/metro stations are Pantai Dalam and Seputeh stations on the Port Klang and Batu Caves–Pulau Sebang Lines respectively on the KTM Komuter network. RapidKL bus route 650 mainly serves Taman Desa and a MRT Feeder Bus from Kuchai which is T585 serving Taman Desa.

Taman Danau Desa is a trendy spot in Taman Desa. The Faber Towers is located here. Business centres like Taman Desa Business Centre, Danau Business Centre, Plaza Danau 2 and the Faber Complex has more shops, clinics, pharmacies, restaurants, bakeries and banks. Also adjacent to Taman Desa is Taman Bukit Desa.

There are also a few schools in Taman Desa such as SK Taman Desa, SK Danau Perdana, SMK Taman Desa and SMK Desa Perdana. SMK Taman Desa might be the highest rated school in Taman Desa but that was a long time ago.

== Residents ==
The neighbourhood offers a large concentration of and many types houses ranging from terraced to villas and many condominiums. The local residents have an association called "TDRA" or Taman Desa Residents Association where neighborhood issues such as security and festivities arrangement are met regularly by a committee. In 2011, a new residents association, Taman Desa Phase 1 Residents Association (TDP1RA) was established to represent and put forth the needs of Phase 1 residents of Taman Desa in particular the Safety and Security needs which resulted in a Guarded Security Scheme which has proven to be very effective as petty crimes dropped significantly with almost zero occurrence within the guarded area.
