= Chamek railway station =

Railway station in Chamek, Malaysia

Coordinates: 2°8′33.7″N 103°14′19.5″E

Chamek

General information
- Location: Chamek, Kluang; Johor; Malaysia
- Owner: Keretapi Tanah Melayu
- Line: West Coast Line
- Platforms: 1 side platform
- Tracks: 3

Construction
- Structure type: At-grade
- Parking: Available, free.

Other information
- Status: Closed as part for double-tracking and electrification project, but not a part for renovation

History
- Opened: 1946
- Closed: 7 September 2020

Former services
Preceding station	Keretapi Tanah Melayu	Following station
Paloh towards Padang Besar	West Coast Line	Kluang towards Woodlands
Location

The Chamek railway station was a Malaysian train station located at and named after the town of Chamek, Kluang District, Johor. When it was opened, the station was located on a curved track alignment with two extra lines running in parallel to possibly allow for more railway operations when the main line was getting occupied by a train stopping at the station.

== Closure and future plan ==
Chamek station closed on 7 September 2020 when the station was not selected for rebuilding as part of the 197km Gemas-Johor Bahru double-tracking and electrification project.

After the closure, Chamek station was earmarked as one of the three future stations, alongside Senai and Tenang, to be built in the federal government's plan for the double-tracking railway line linking Gemas to Johor Baru.

== See also ==
- Rail transport in Malaysia
