= Mahadevan Mahalingam =

Malaysian doctor (1929–2026)

Mahadevan Mahalingam (9 September 1929 – 15 June 2026) was a Malaysian doctor, widely considered by his country’s media and scientific community to be thee father of modern psychiatry in Malaysia.

During his long career, he transformed the country's mental healthcare from a system of confinement to one built on dignity, rehabilitation, and understanding.

== Early life ==
He was born in Kuala Lumpur on 9 September 1929. He was the sixth child and third son of civil servant Mahalingam Appukutee Mailvaganam and Mabel Ratna Ammal.

He studied at St. John's Institution.

He undertook medical studies in Bangalore, India, in 1961.

== Career ==
In 1965, he accepted an invitation to work with John Dunn in Dublin, Ireland. He had further engagements with renowned psychiatrists at Columbia University under Herbert Spiegel and at Harvard University under Chester Pierce.

In 1967, at the request of Malaysia's prime minister, Tunku Abdul Rahman, he returned from Ireland to develop Malaysia's modern psychiatric infrastructure.

As its first director, he changed the name of the Central Mental Hospital in Tanjung Rambutan to Hospital Bahagia Ulu Kinta in order to remove social stigma and instill hope.

He introduced community-based rehabilitation and pioneered unconventional methods for psychosocial rehabilitation. This included clinical hypnotherapy and equine therapy.

He served as the government's chief psychiatrist during the 1980s and was also founding president of the Malaysian Psychiatric Association.

He was the first Malaysian president of the International College of Psychosomatic Medicine's Asian chapter.

== Legacy ==
Harvard University established a travelling fellowship named in his honour.

In 2004, his biography Mad Heaven was penned by Aneeta Sundararaj.

== Legal disputes ==
In 2009, Mahadevan claimed that he became disabled and began using a wheelchair after a vicious attack by thugs on 14 December 2009, over a family dispute in court over four plots of land.

In January 2014, the KL High Court ordered then MIC treasurer-general Ramanan Ramakrishnan to pay back RM5.5 million to Mahadevan. The court ruled that Ramanan had misrepresented himself by claiming he could assist Mahadevan to retrieve a RM26.6 million debt from the Defence Ministry for using the psychiatrist's land in Sungei Petani, Kedah, as a firing range between 1968 and 1988. It found that Ramanan produced a forged letter from the ministry giving the assurance that payment would be made, prompting Mahadevan to pay RM5.5 million into Ramanan's personal account on 19 May 2010.

== Death ==
Mahadevan died in his home at Ukay Heights from heart failure and lung infection on 15 June 2026.
