= Kota Bharu railway station =

Railway station in Kampar, Perak, Malaysia

Kota Baharu

General information
- Other names: Malay: کوتا بهارو (Jawi); Chinese: 古打华路; Tamil: கோத்தா பாகாரு
- Location: Kota Bharu, Perak; Malaysia
- Owner: Keretapi Tanah Melayu
- Operator: KTM Kargo
- Line: West Coast Line
- Platforms: 1 side platform (small for freight unloading)
- Tracks: 2

Other information
- Status: Converted into freight yard

History
- Rebuilt: 2007

Services
Preceding station	Keretapi Tanah Melayu	Following station
Batu Gajah towards Padang Besar	West Coast Line	Kampar towards Woodlands

The Kota Bharu railway station (also known as Kota Bharu Freight Yard) is a Malaysian train station in Kota Bharu, Gopeng, Kampar District, Perak. But prior to the Rawang–Ipoh Electrified Double Tracking project, the station has turned into a freight yard. So, people who stay in Kota Bharu will no longer get the passenger services. The nearest passenger station is the Batu Gajah railway station.
