= Pantai Dalam Komuter station =

Railway station in Pantai Dalam, Malaysia

Coordinates: 3°05′42″N 101°40′11″E

KD03 CC30 Pantai Dalam
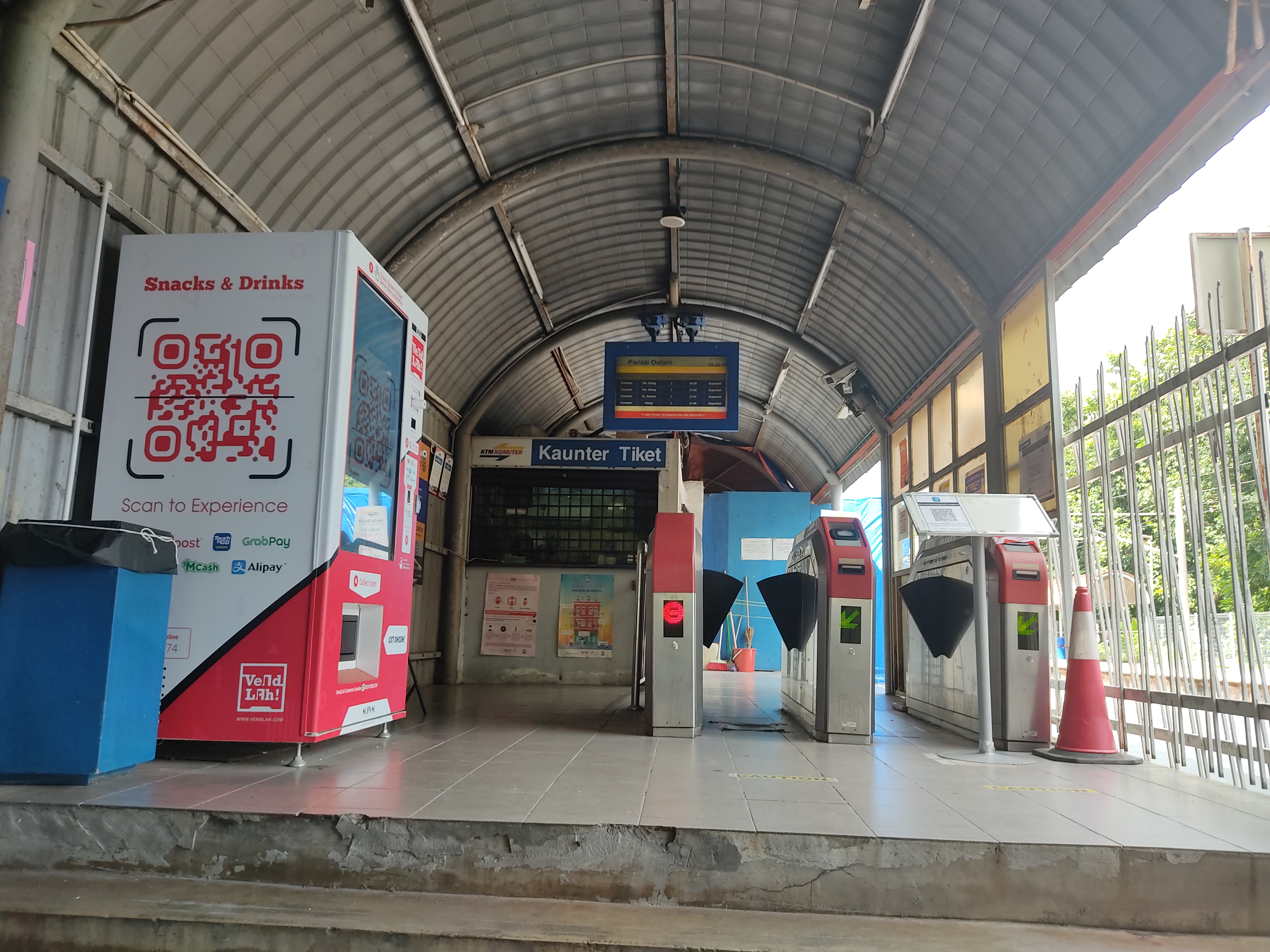
- Main entrance of Pantai Dalam station (Jalan Pantai Dalam side)

General information
- Other names: Malay: ڤنتاي دالم (Jawi); Chinese: 班底达南; Tamil: பந்தாய் டாலாம்
- Location: Pantai Dalam, 59200 Kuala Lumpur
- System: | Commuter rail and future MRT station
- Owner: Keretapi Tanah Melayu
- Lines: Port Klang Branch, MRT Circle Line
- Platforms: 2 side platforms (only 1 in use)
- Tracks: 2 (only 1 in use)

Construction
- Parking: Not Available

Other information
- Station code: KD03 CC30

History
- Opened: 1995; 31 years ago (KTM)
- Opening: 2030; 4 years' time (MRT)
- Former names: Pantai

Services
Preceding station	Keretapi Tanah Melayu (Komuter)	Following station
Angkasapuri towards Tanjung Malim	Tanjung Malim–Port Klang Line	Petaling towards Port Klang
Preceding station		Following station
Pantai Permai Clockwise / outer	Circle Line Future service	Jalan Klang Lama Anticlockwise / inner
Location

The Pantai Dalam Komuter station is a KTM Komuter train station in Pantai Dalam, Lembah Pantai, Kuala Lumpur, Malaysia and served by the Port Klang Line. The station is built to cater the traffic in Pantai Dalam, as well as the northern parts of Jalan Klang Lama (i.e. Taman Desa, Scott Garden, Kuchai Lama).

The Pantai Dalam station usually busy during rush hours, public holidays and weekends as it is used by worker to reach offices.

== Name ==
Pantai Dalam station was simply Pantai station in the 1980s before taking its current name, Pantai Dalam.

== Gallery ==
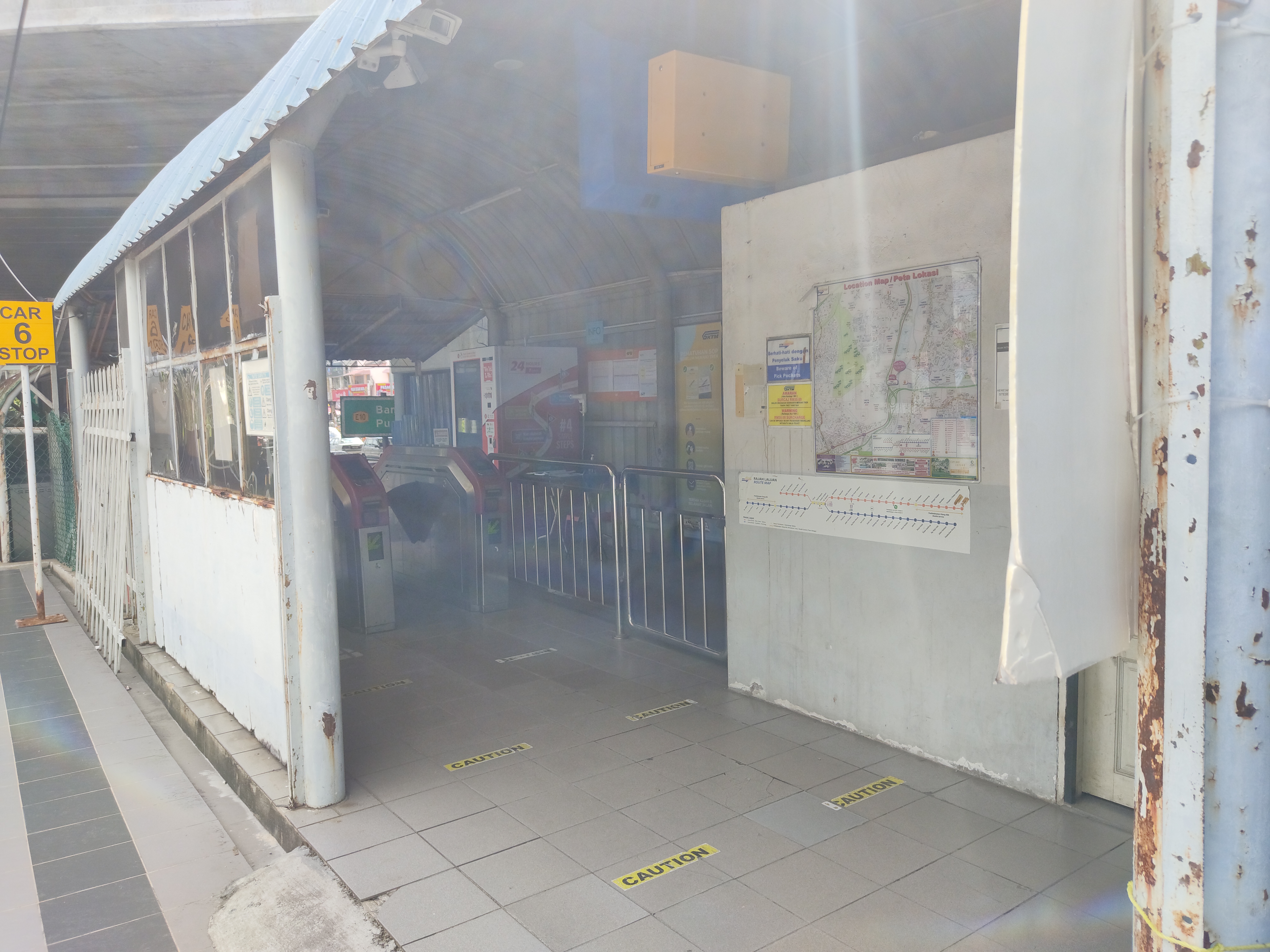
Station building and faregates

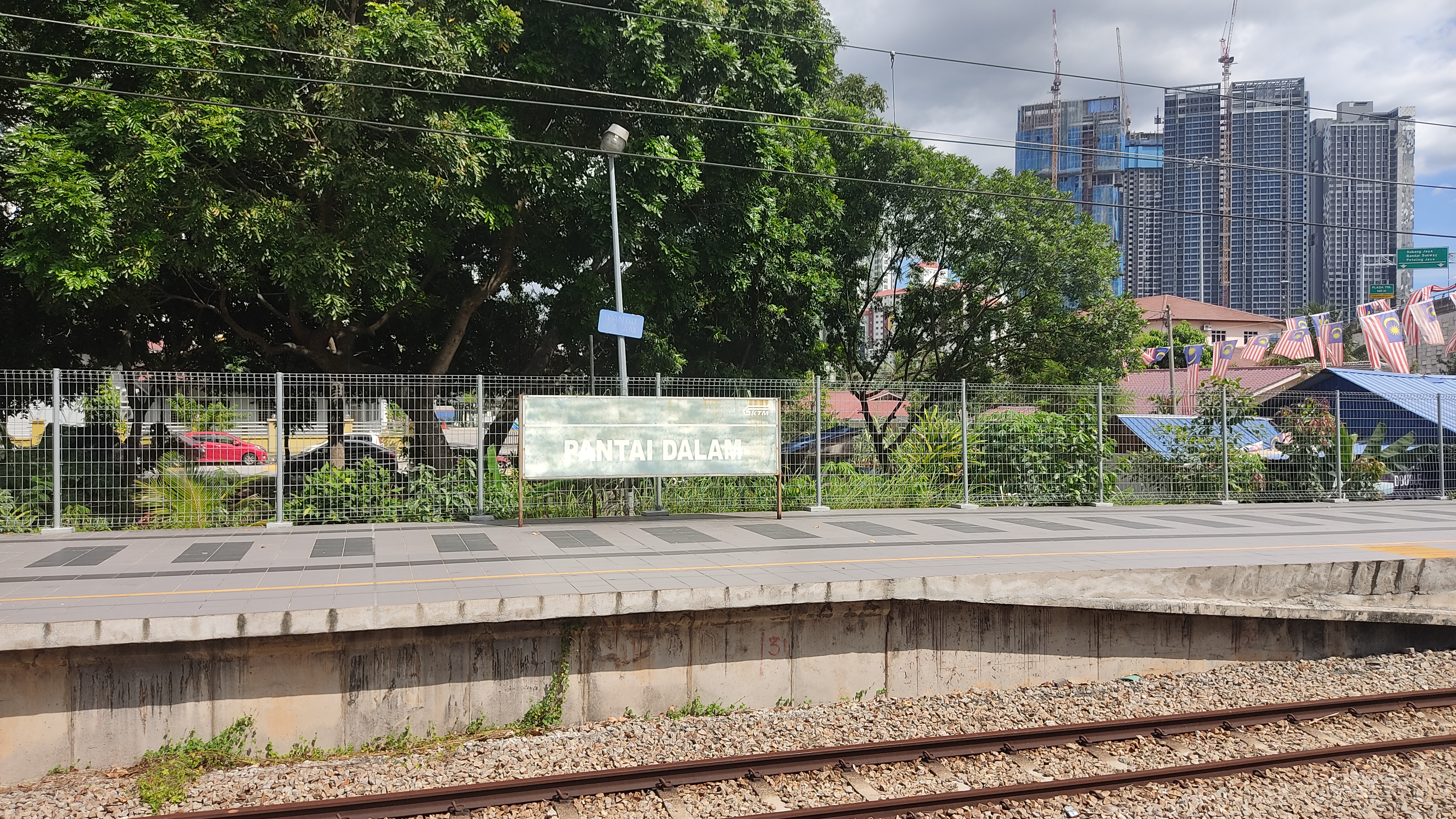
Faded station signboard

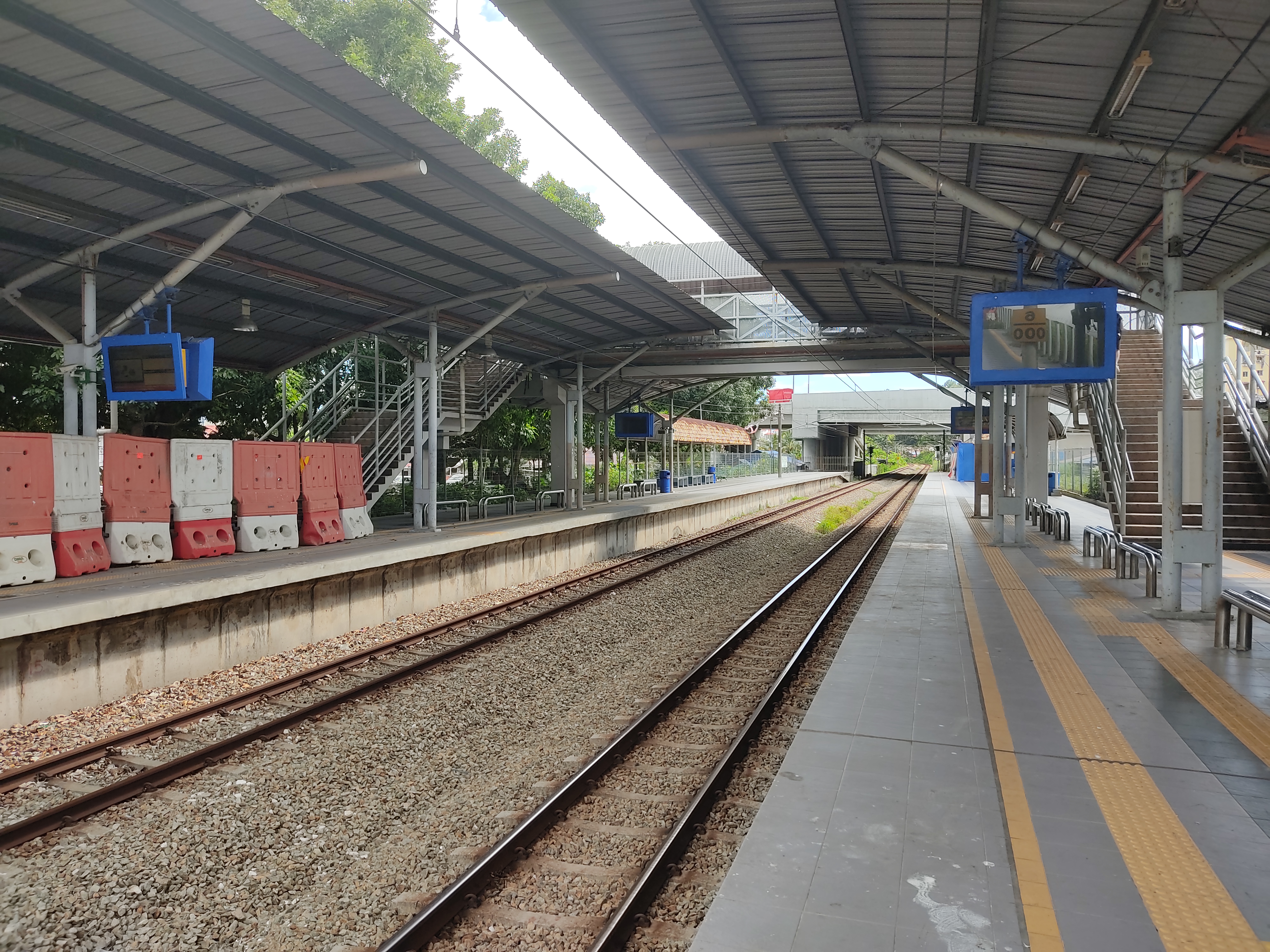
Station platform of Pantai Dalam station

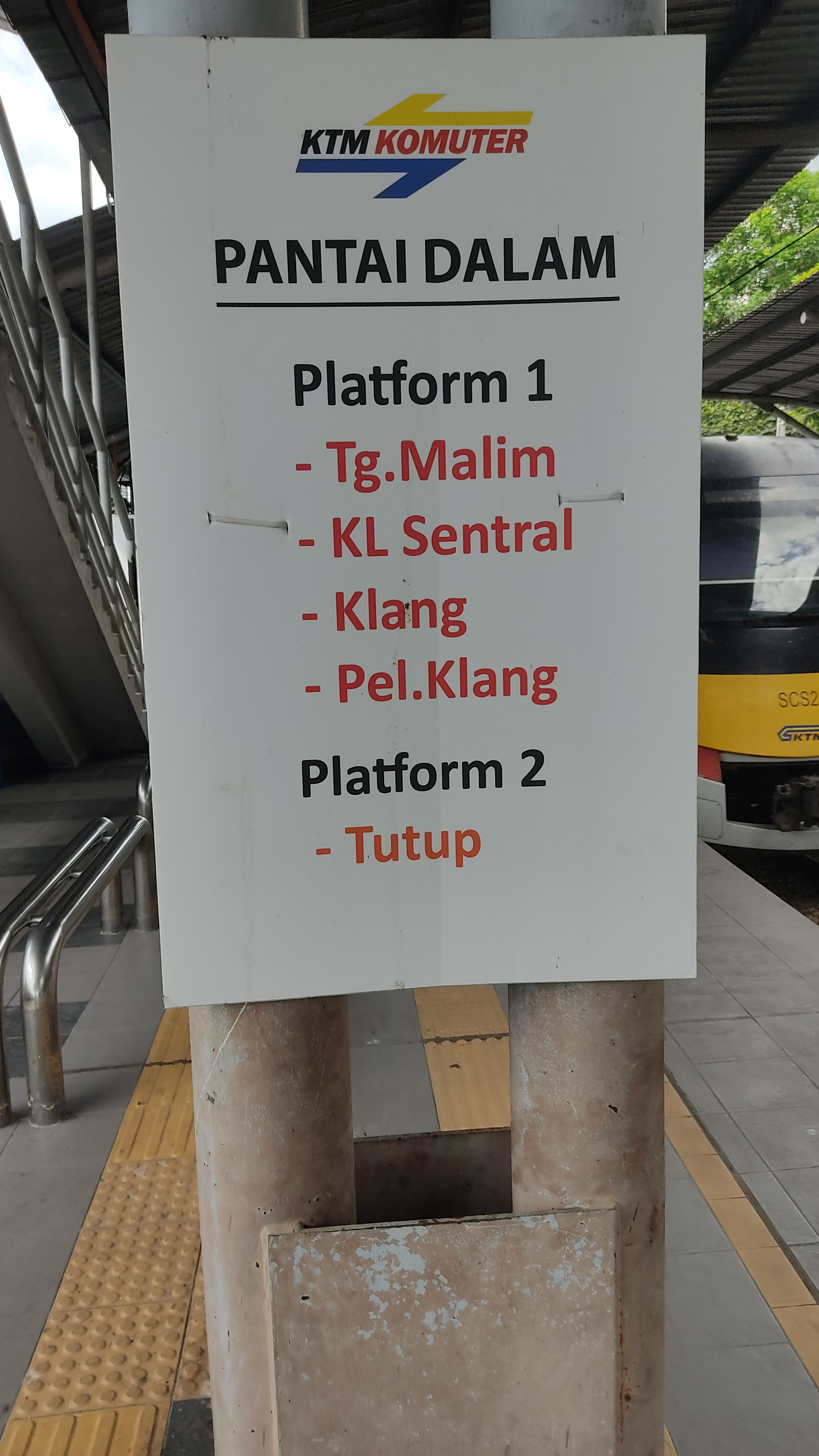
Only one side platform is currently being used as of 2021 due to the KVDT project

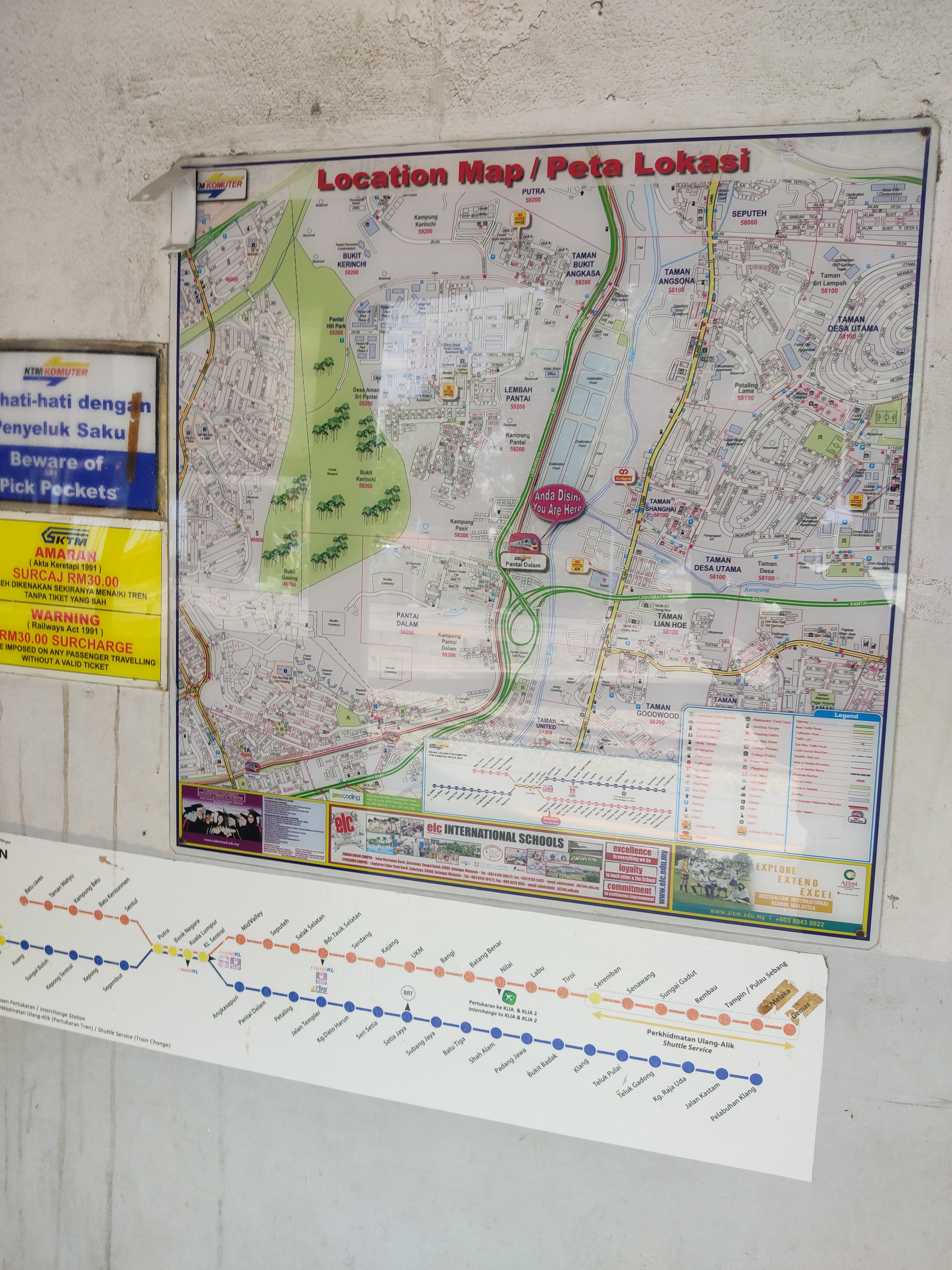
Location map of Pantai Dalam station
