= Petaling Komuter station =

Railway station in Petaling, Malaysia

Coordinates: 3°05′10″N 101°39′51″E

Petaling

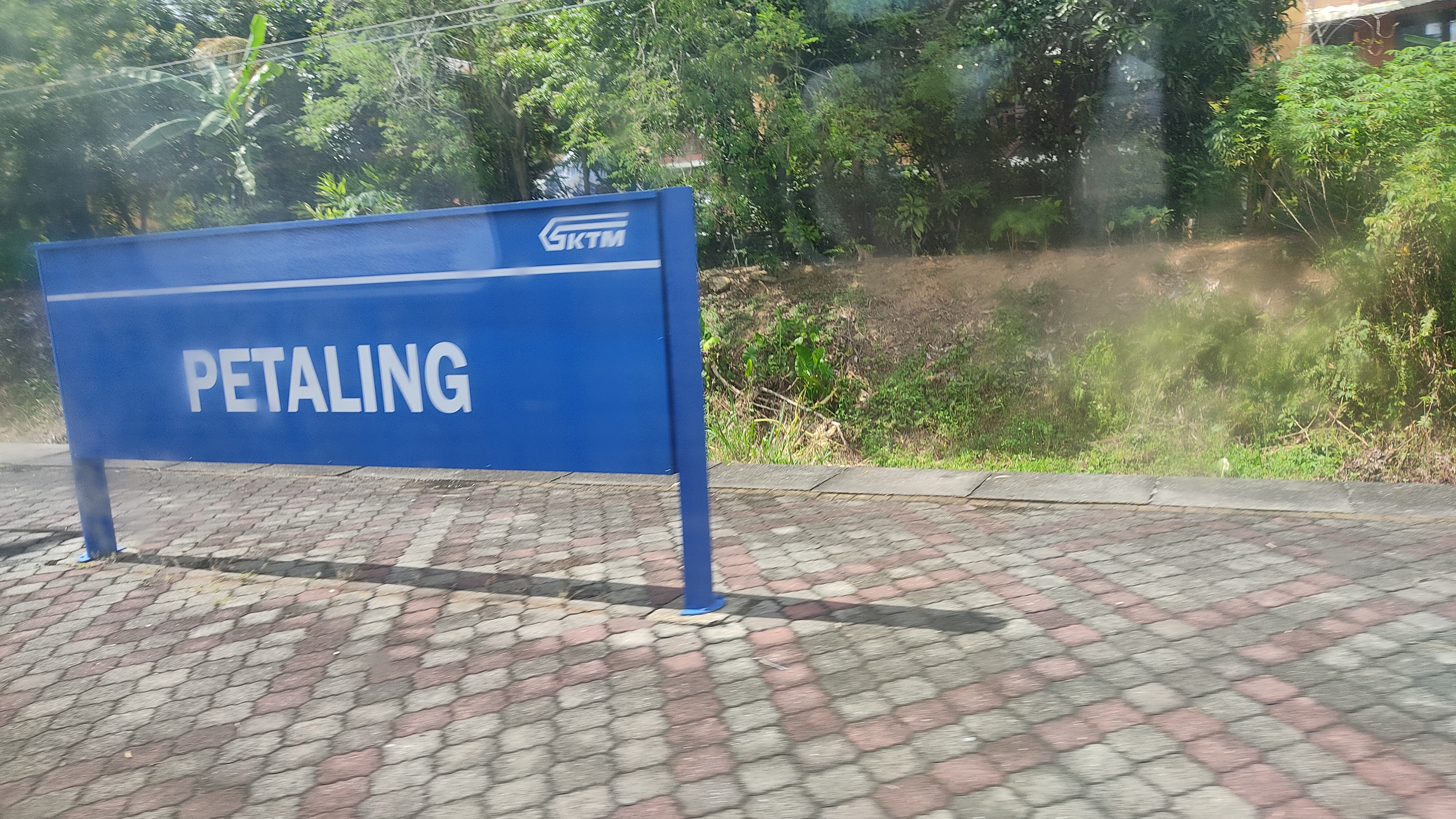

General information
- Other names: Malay: ڤتاليڠ (Jawi); Chinese: 八打灵; Tamil: பெட்டாலிங்
- Location: Jalan Kampung Pasir, 58200 Kuala Lumpur
- System: KD04 | Commuter rail station
- Owner: Keretapi Tanah Melayu
- Line: Port Klang Branch
- Platforms: 1 side platform & 1 island platform
- Tracks: 4

Construction
- Parking: Available

Other information
- Station code: KD04

History
- Opened: 1886
- Rebuilt: 1995

Services
Preceding station	Keretapi Tanah Melayu (Komuter)	Following station
Pantai Dalam towards Tanjung Malim	Tanjung Malim–Port Klang Line	Jalan Templer towards Port Klang
Location

The Petaling Komuter station (formerly Petaling railway station) is a commuter train station located in Kampung Pasir, Lembah Pantai, in southwestern Kuala Lumpur, Malaysia, served by the Port Klang Line. The station was built near the western end of Old Klang Road, where it then merges into the New Pantai Expressway.

The station primarily serves the suburbs along the southern and western part of Old Klang Road, namely Taman OUG and Taman Gembira.

The Petaling station is usually busy during rush hours, public holidays and weekends as it is used by workers to reach offices. It is also used by school children as many schools are situated in this area.

The KL Sentral–Terminal Skypark Line passes through this station, but does not stop here.

== Gallery ==
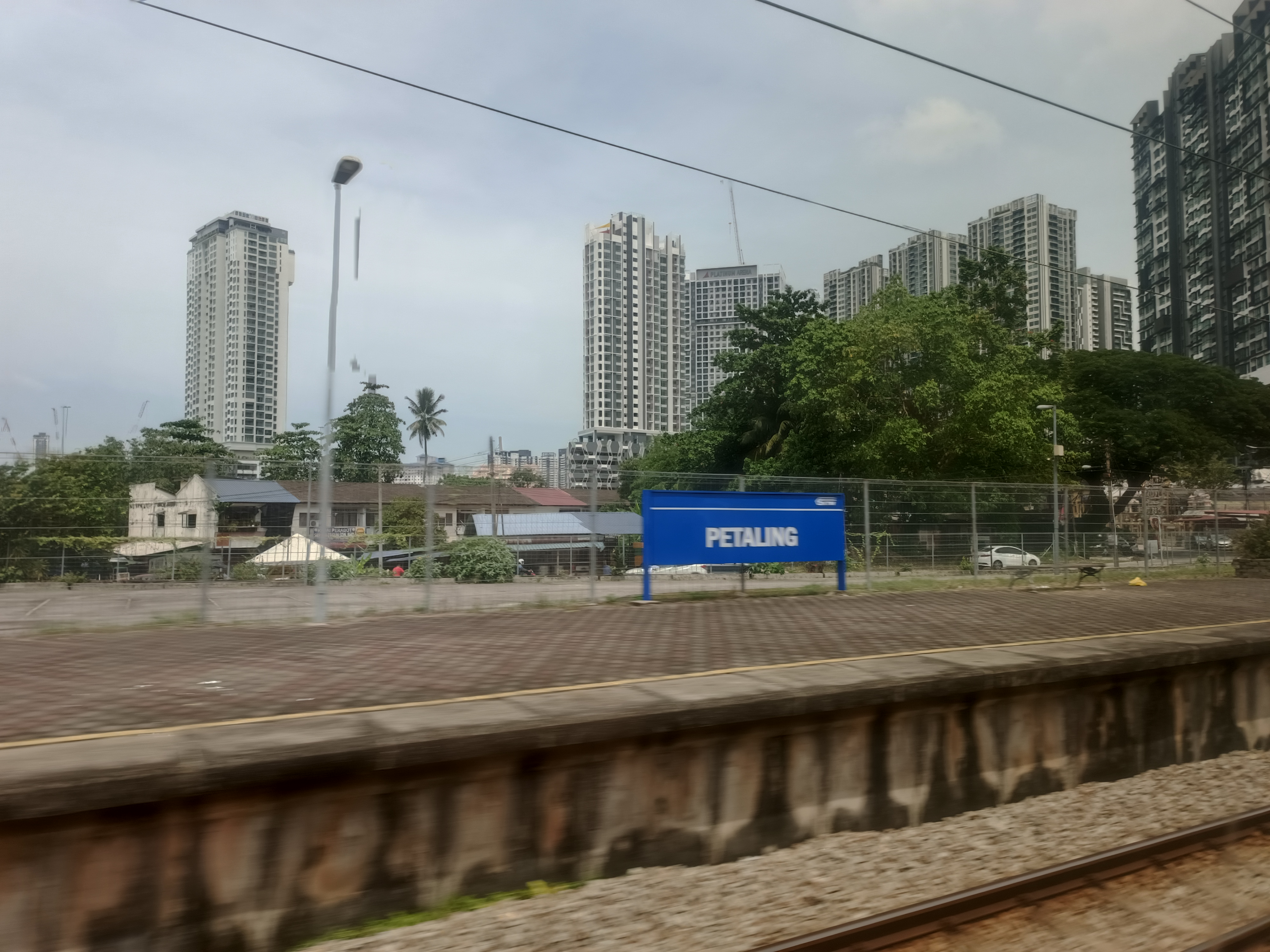
Station platform of Petaling station

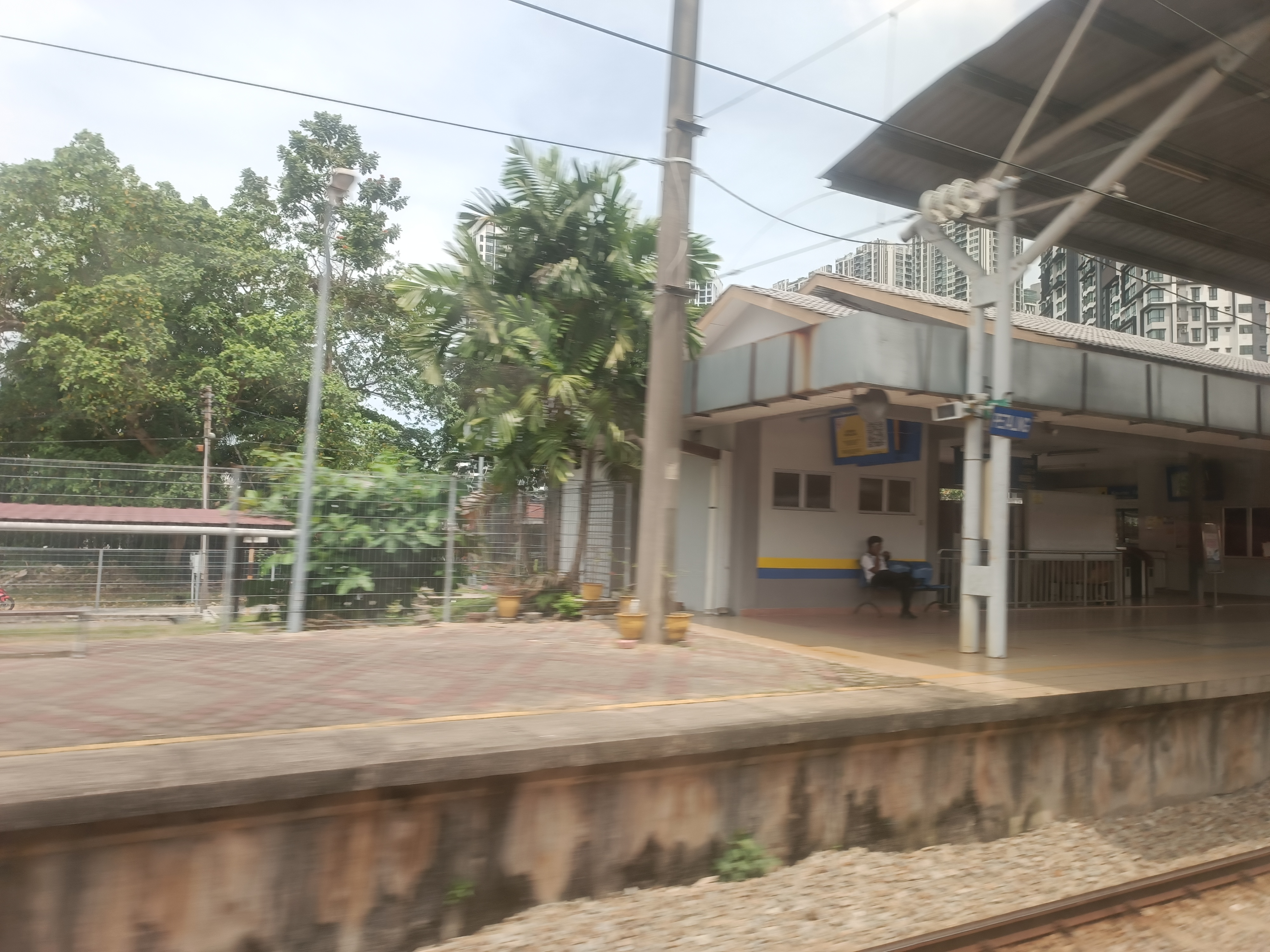
Station platform of Petaling station

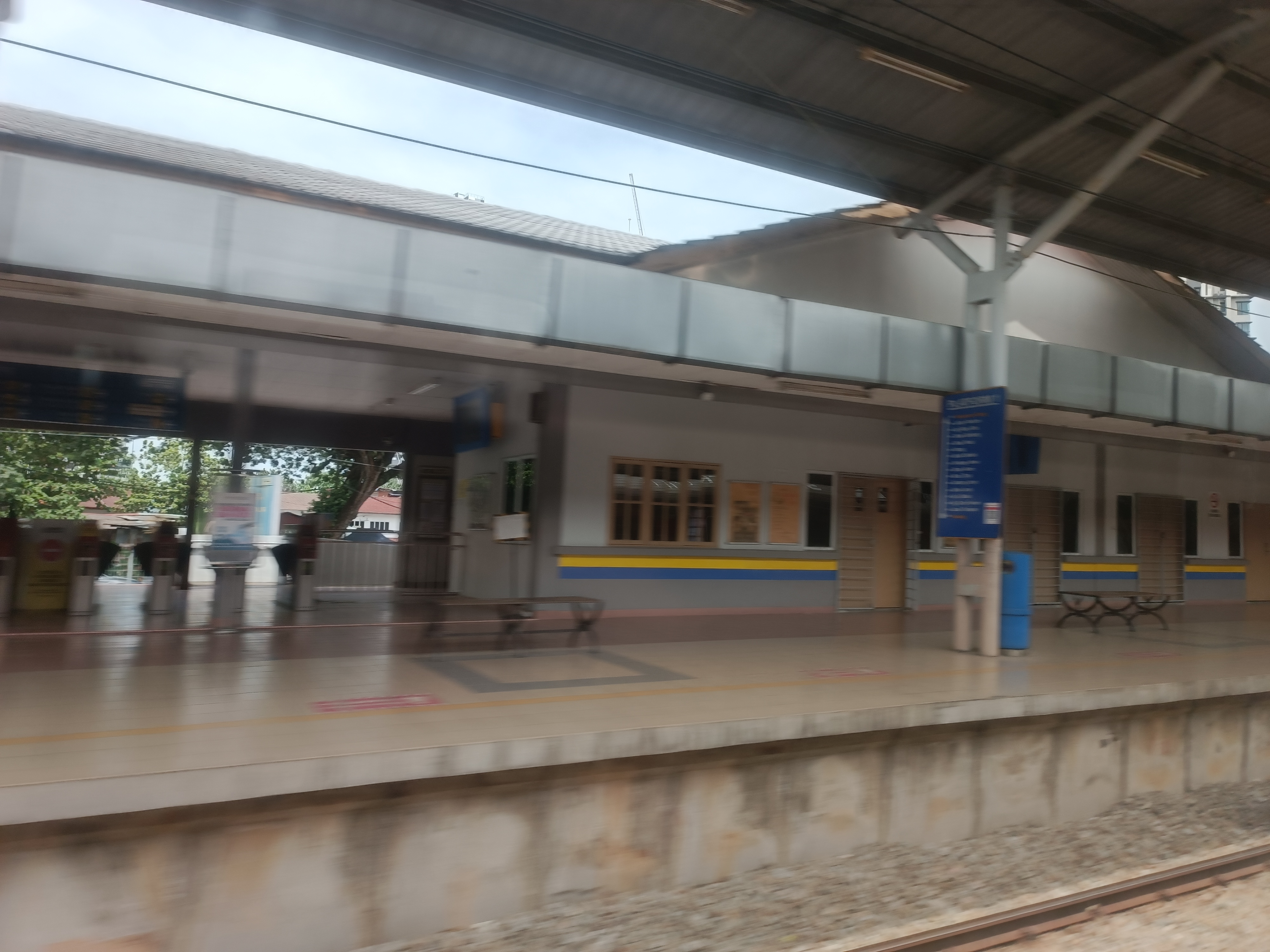
Station platform of Petaling station

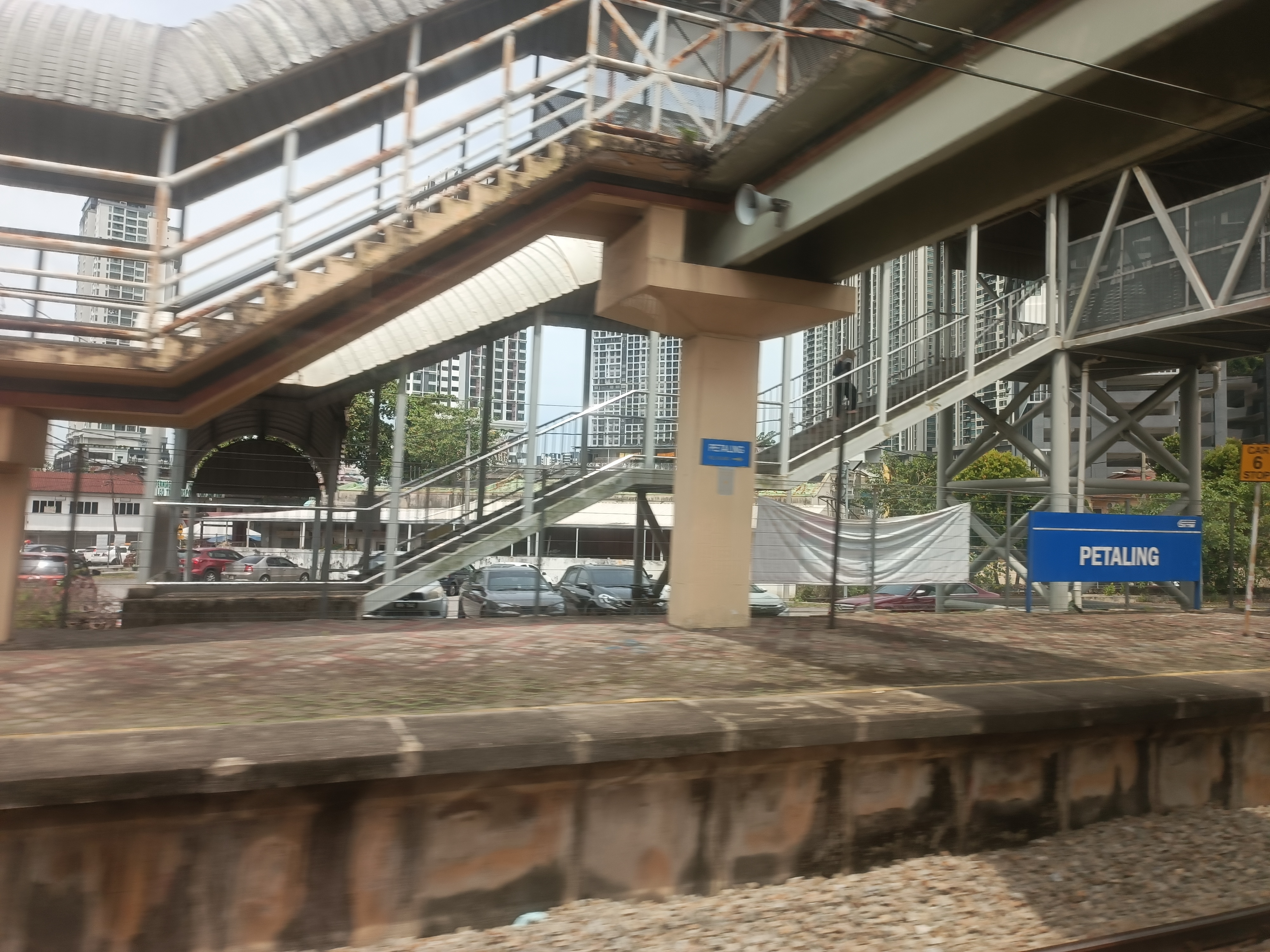
Station platform of Petaling station
