= Chamek =

Village in Kluang District, Johor, Malaysia

- Malaysia New village
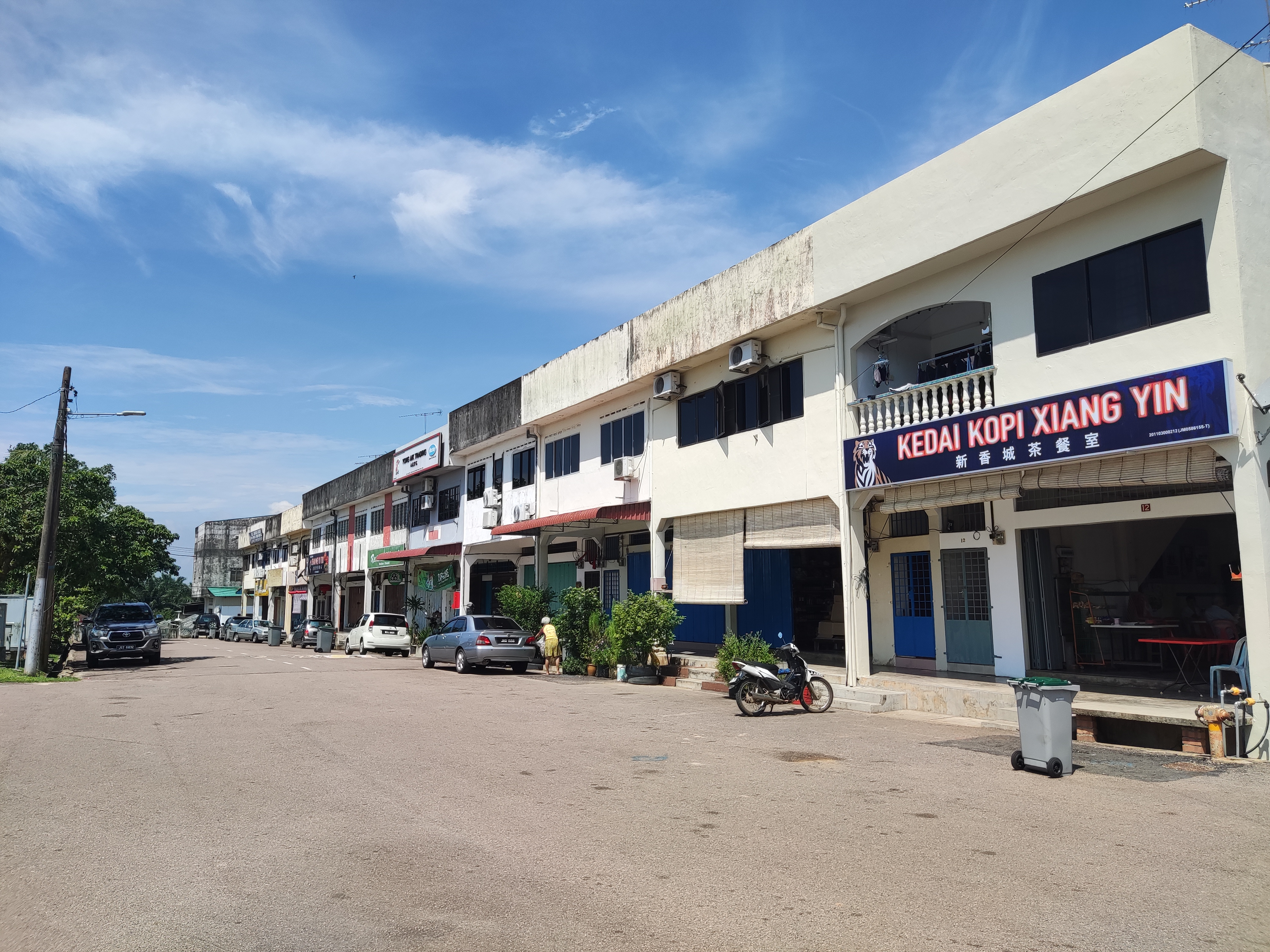
- Street of Chamek

- Location within Johor Location within Malaysia
- Coordinates: 2°08′35″N 103°14′19″E
- Country: Malaysia
- State: Johor
- District: Kluang
- Postcode: 86600 (Paloh)

Chamek (Jawi: چاميق, Chinese: 占美) is a village in Kluang District, Johor, Malaysia. The name originated from the Chinese variation of the word Jambi, which is rather hard to pronounce.

The village is a multiracial village, having all Chinese, Malays and Indians. Mostly, the Malays are of the Javanese descendants, and they practiced the Javanese culture in their everyday life. The populations mainly work in rubber plantation, palm plantation, and a few opened grocery stores.

The village is located nearer to a small town of Paloh, where the public amenities, such as post office, health center, and police station are more available.

== Transportation ==
The town was served by Chamek Railway Station of Keretapi Tanah Melayu. The station was closed permanently on 7 September 2020 due to the Gemas-Johor Bahru electrification and double tracking project.

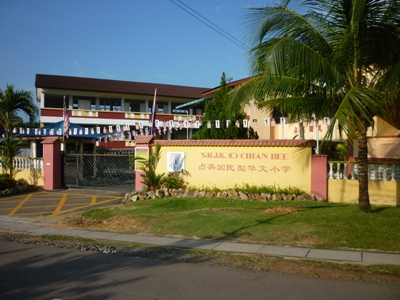
SJKC Chian Bee

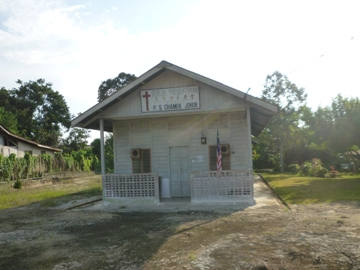
Church

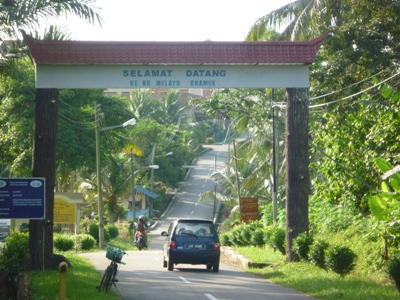
Gerbang Pintu Kampung Melayu Chamek

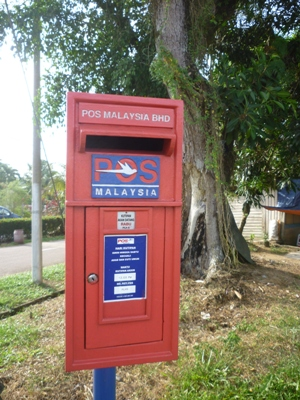
Letter Post

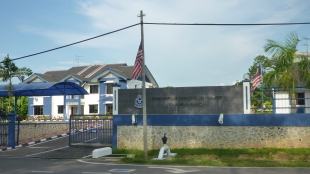
Police Station Building

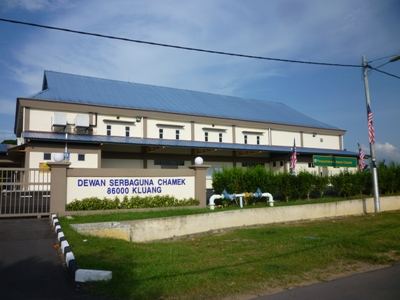
Multi Purpose Hall

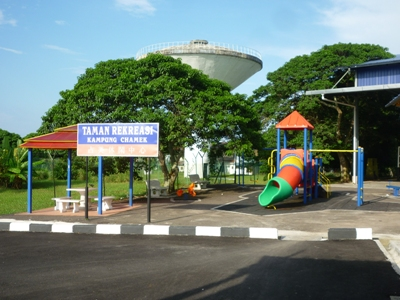
Playground

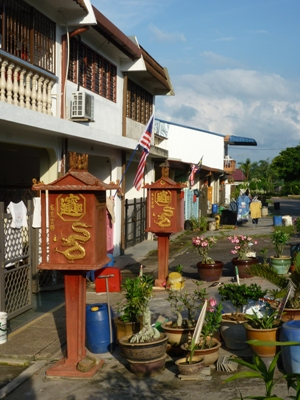
Houses with national flag
