= Faber Towers =

- Interactive map of the Faber Towers area

General information
- Type: Commercial building consisting of offices & retails
- Location: Taman Desa; Kuala Lumpur, Malaysia
- Coordinates: 3.1021°N 101.6849°E
- Construction started: 1985
- Completed: 1986, refurbishment completed in 3rd quarter 2015
- Owner: Canggih Pesaka Sdn Bhd
- Management: Faber Towers Management Committee

Technical details
- Floor count: 21
- Lifts/elevators: 12 passenger lifts and 2 service lifts

Design and construction
- Architect: Faber Group

Faber Towers is a twin tower skyscraper in Taman Desa, Seputeh, Kuala Lumpur, Malaysia. It is one of the earliest skyscrapers completed in the city. After changed the majority of its ownership, Faber Towers has undergone massive refurbishment work and the work has been completed in the 3rd quarter of 2015. The refurbished twin tower with 18-storey office towers and a podium block consisting of 3 level of retail lots is among the tallest structures in Taman Desa.
