= Tasek railway station =

Railway station in Ipoh, Malaysia

Coordinates: 4.6528°N 101.1202°E

Tasek

General information
- Other names: Malay: تاسيق (Jawi); Chinese: 打昔; Tamil: தாசேக்
- Owner: Keretapi Tanah Melayu
- Line: West Coast Line
- Platforms: 2 island platforms
- Tracks: 5

Construction
- Accessible: Y

Former services
| Preceding station | Keretapi Tanah Melayu | Following station |
|---|---|---|
Closed as part of the KTM ETS
| Chemor towards Padang Besar | West Coast Line | Ipoh towards Woodlands |
Location

Tasek is a railway station situated in Ipoh, Perak, Malaysia. It was opened in 2015 along with the other northern ETS stations between Ipoh and Padang Besar. Currently, this station is not in use as neither the ETS railway service nor the recently extended KTM Komuter service stop here.
