= Kampung Dato Harun Komuter station =

Railway station in Malaysia

Coordinates: 3°05′04″N 101°37′56″E

Kg. Dato' Harun

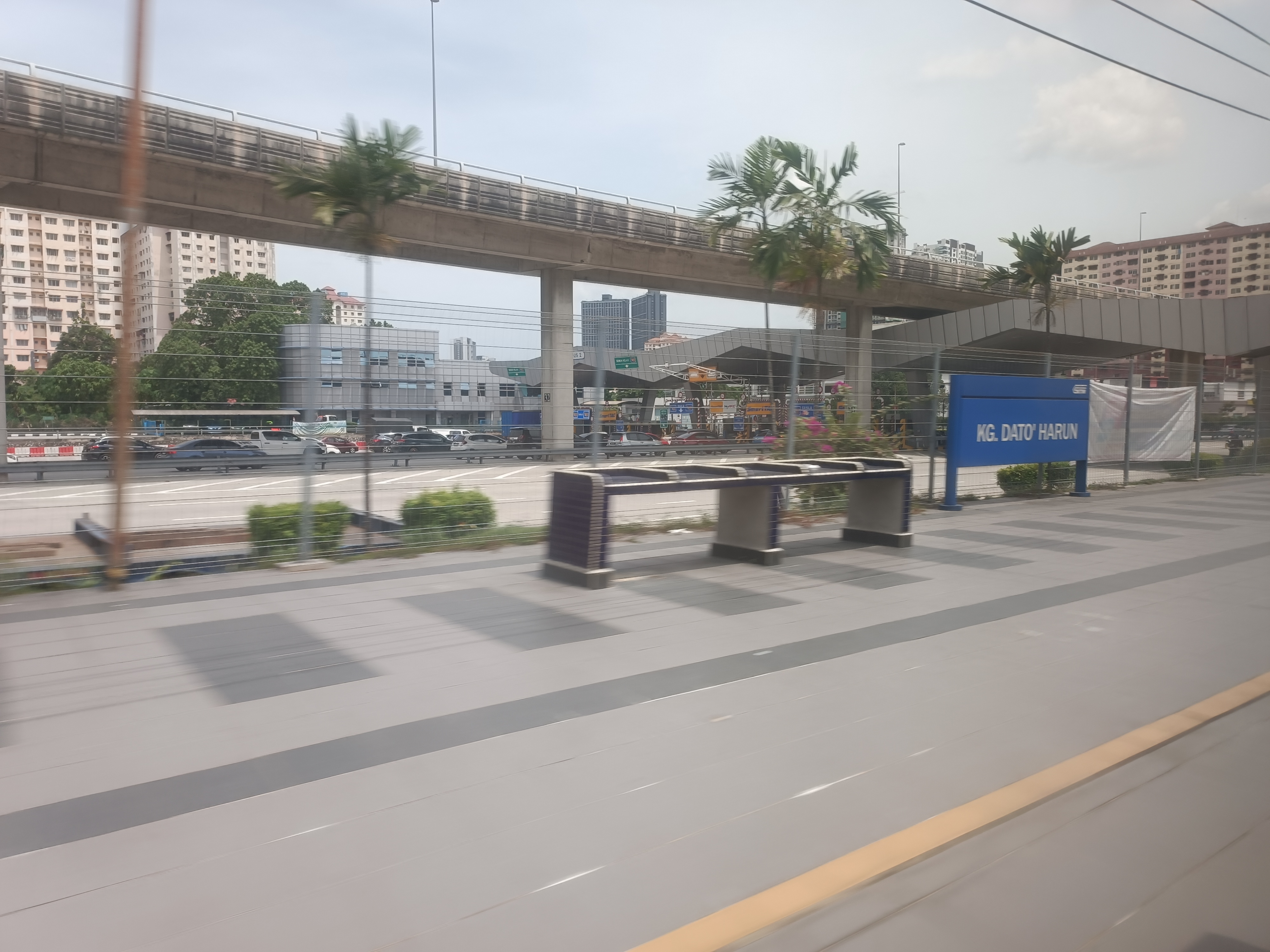

General information
- Other names: Malay: کامڤوڠ داتوء هارون (Jawi); Chinese: 甘榜拿督哈伦; Tamil: கம்போங் டத்தோ அருண்
- Location: Kampung Dato' Harun, 46100 Petaling Jaya; Selangor; Malaysia
- System: KD06 | Commuter rail station
- Operator: Keretapi Tanah Melayu
- Line: Port Klang Branch
- Platforms: 2 side platforms
- Tracks: 2

Construction
- Structure type: At-grade
- Parking: Not available

Other information
- Station code: KD06

History
- Opened: 14 August 1995
- Electrified: 25 kV AC
- Former names: MAHA Lama

Services
Preceding station	Keretapi Tanah Melayu (Komuter)	Following station
Jalan Templer towards Tanjung Malim	Tanjung Malim–Port Klang Line	Seri Setia towards Port Klang
Location

The Kampung Dato' Harun Komuter station is a commuter train station located in Petaling Jaya, Selangor near PJS 2 Flyover New Pantai Expressway Bangsar bount, and served by the Port Klang Line.

The Kampung Dato' Harun station located in Section 51 of Petaling Jaya and was built to cater the traffic there and named after the Malay village nearby, Kampung Dato' Harun.

The Komuter station usually busy during rush hours as it is used by worker to reach their offices. It is also used by factory workers as many factories are situated in this area. A few of those factories are Continental Sime Tyre Sdn Bhd, Nestle Manufacturing (M) Sdn Bhd, Sapura Resources Bhd, etc. Taman Medan Jaya and Desa Mentari (Ph.4) are the residential properties nearest to this station.

== Name ==
This station was named MAHA Lama Station in the 1980s.
