= Jalan Templer Komuter station =

Railway station in Petaling Jaya, Malaysia

Jalan Templer

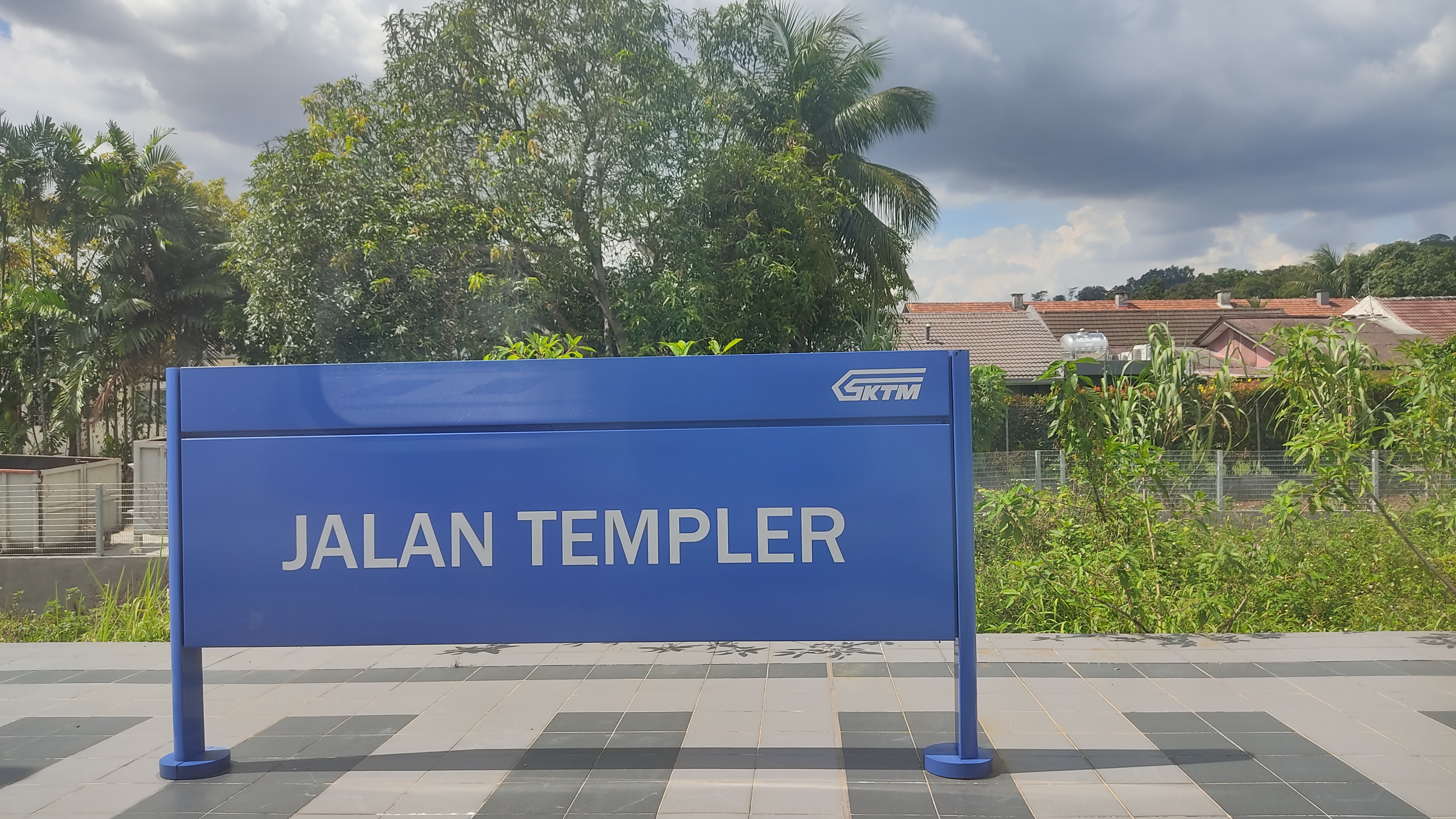

General information
- Other names: Malay: جالن تمقلر (Jawi); Chinese: 邓普勒路; Tamil: ஜாலான் டெம்பிளர்
- Location: Jalan Templer, 46000 Petaling Jaya, Selangor
- System: KD05 | Commuter rail station
- Owner: Keretapi Tanah Melayu
- Line: Port Klang Branch
- Platforms: 1 side platform; 1 island platform
- Tracks: 3

Construction
- Parking: Available

Other information
- Station code: KD05

History
- Rebuilt: 1995

Services
Preceding station	Keretapi Tanah Melayu (Komuter)	Following station
Petaling towards Tanjung Malim	Tanjung Malim–Port Klang Line	Kampung Dato Harun towards Port Klang
Location

The Jalan Templer Komuter station is a commuter train station located in Petaling Jaya, Selangor. It is served by the KTM Komuter's Port Klang Line.

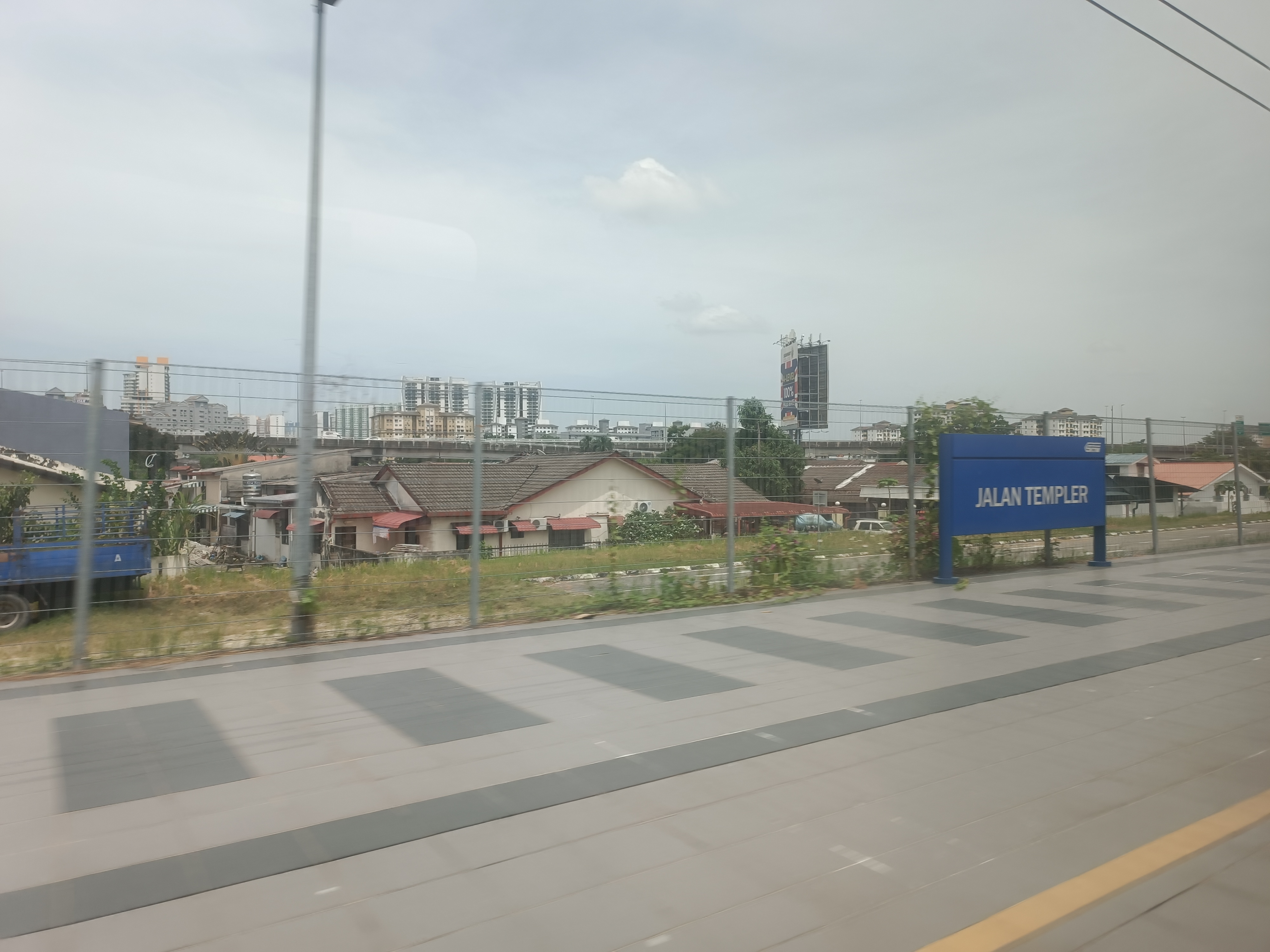
Jalan Templer station

Jalan Templer is one of the busiest major roads in Petaling Jaya, Selangor. It was the first road built in Petaling Jaya and was simply called "Jalan 1" or Road 1. The road was named after the former British High Commissioner in Malaya, Sir Gerald Templer. The station named after the road and was built to cater the traffic in this area and its surroundings.

The Jalan Templer station usually busy during rush hours as it is used by worker to reach offices. It is also used by school children as many schools and colleges are situated in this area. The Kolej Kemahiran Tinggi MARA and Bangunan Peladang are within walking distance to this station. However, at other time, the station is quite deserted. It is advisable to pre-book a taxi before arrival.

Nearest residential properties to this station are Inai Court Apartment and landed houses in Section 1, Section 1A & Section 18.

== Name ==
In the 1980s this station was known as Petaling Jaya Station, before assuming its current name.
