= Sungai Way =

Suburb of Petaling Jaya, Malaysia

Coordinates: 3.0871607°N 101.6195746°E

Sungai Way is a suburb of Petaling Jaya, Petaling District, Selangor, Malaysia. It was established in 1949 by the Briggs Plan as a Chinese new village. After independence, Sungai Way become a populated place. Subsequent developments established a new industrial zone (known as Sungai Way industrial zone) prior to the opening of Federal Highway, and also Subang-Sungai Way (Subang Jaya sections) and Bandar Sunway. Sungai Way's official name is Seri Setia. Sungai Way's name comes from the fact that it is located near a river (sungai is the Malay word for "river") with "Way" being an English word.
