= Tunjang railway station =

Railway station in Malaysia

Coordinates: 6.26667°N 100.35°E

Tunjang

General information
- Location: Tunjang, Malaysia
- Line: West Coast Line
- Platforms: 1 side platforms
- Tracks: 2

Construction
- Parking: Available, free.

Other information
- Status: Demolished

History
- Opened: 1938–1963
- Closed: 2010
- Original company: Keretapi Tanah Melayu

Former services
Preceding station	Keretapi Tanah Melayu	Following station
Arau towards Padang Besar	North–South Line	Alor Setar towards Tanjong Pagar
Location

The Tunjang railway station is a Malaysian train station located at and named after the town of Tunjang. It closed and demolished in 2010 for giving way to the construction Ipoh–Padang Besar electrified and double-tracking project.
