= Ladang Jenun railway station =

Railway station in Malaysia

Ladang Jenun

General information
- Location: Ladang Jenun, Kedah; Malaysia
- Line: West Coast Line
- Platforms: 1 side platform 1 island platform
- Tracks: 3

Construction
- Parking: Available, free.
- Accessible: Y

Other information
- Status: Demolished

History
- Opened: 1938–1963
- Closed: 2010
- Original company: Keretapi Tanah Melayu

Former services
Preceding station	Keretapi Tanah Melayu	Following station
Alor Setar towards Padang Besar	North–South Line	Gurun towards Tanjong Pagar

The Ladang Jenun railway station was a Malaysian train station located at and named after the town of Ladang Jenun, Kedah. It was closed and demolished in 2010 for giving way to the construction Ipoh–Padang Besar electrified and double-tracking project.
