= Sungai Petani railway station =

Railway station in Kuala Muda, Kedah, Malaysia

Coordinates: 5°38′35″N 100°29′24″E

Sungai Petani

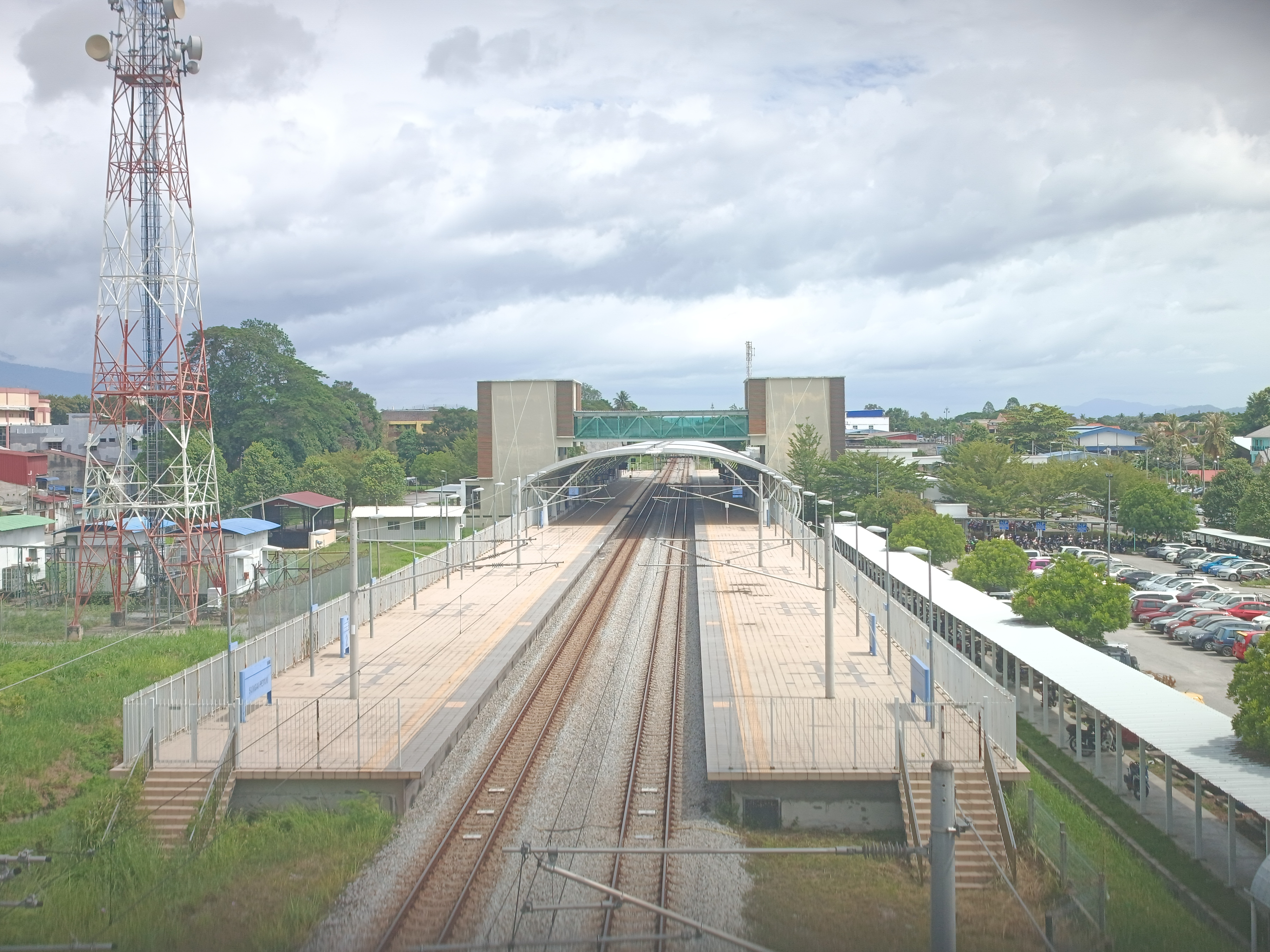

General information
- Other names: Malay: سوڠاي ڤتاني (Jawi); Chinese: 双溪大年; Tamil: சுங்கை பட்டாணி
- Location: Sungai Petani; Kedah; Malaysia
- Owner: Railway Assets Corporation
- Operator: Keretapi Tanah Melayu
- Line: West Coast Line
- Platforms: 2 side platforms
- Tracks: 2
- Connections: K51 Sungai Petani - Merbok - Tanjung Dawai K60 Sungai Petani - Sungai Lalang - Klinik Kesihatan Sungai Lalang; K61 Sungai Petani - Taman Ria; K62 Sungai Petani - Mydin Taman Batik

Construction
- Structure type: At-grade
- Parking: Available, free
- Accessible: Yes

History
- Opened: 1915
- Rebuilt: 2013
- Electrified: 2015

Services
Preceding station	KTM Komuter	Following station
Gurun towards Padang Besar	Padang Besar–Butterworth Line	Tasek Gelugor towards Butterworth
Preceding station	ETS	Following station
Alor Setar towards Padang Besar	KL Sentral–Padang Besar (Express)	Taiping towards KL Sentral
Alor Setar towards Padang Besar	KL Sentral–Padang Besar (Platinum)	Tasek Gelugor towards KL Sentral
Alor Setar towards Padang Besar	Padang Besar–JB Sentral (Platinum)	Tasek Gelugor towards JB Sentral
Gurun towards Padang Besar	Padang Besar–JB Sentral (Gold)	Tasek Gelugor towards JB Sentral
Location

The Sungai Petani railway station is a Malaysian train station located in and named after the town of Sungai Petani, Kedah. The station is on Keretapi Tanah Melayu's (KTM) West Coast Line and is served by the KTM ETS and the KTM Komuter Northern Sector services. It was also previously served by the International Express.

The station was rebuilt under the Ipoh-Padang Besar Electrification and Double-Tracking Project (EDTP) and became operational on 10 June 2014.

On 11 September 2015, Keretapi Tanah Melayu Berhad introduced the Northern Sector KTM Komuter Shuttle (Tren Shuttle KTM Komuter Sektor Utara in Malay) service between Gurun in Kedah, Butterworth in Pulau Pinang and Kamunting in Perak. This followed the completion of the Ipoh-Padang Besar Electrification and Double-Tracking Project in December 2014. This has since been expanded into the Padang Besar-Butterworth route of the KTM Komuter Northern Sector line.

== Bus Services ==
=== Feeder bus service ===
Feeder buses also began operating linking the station with several housing and commercial areas in Sungai Petani, maintained by Bas.My Kota Setar.

Route type	Code	Origin	Desitination	Via
BAS.MY Kota Setar	K51	Sungai Petani Bus Station	Tanjung Dawai	Sungai Lalang; Bedong; Merbok; Tanjung Dawai
BAS.MY Kota Setar	K60	Sungai Petani Bus Station	Sungai Lalang Health Clinic	Sungai Lalang; Sungai Lalang Health Clinic
BAS.MY Kota Setar	K61	Sungai Petani Bus Station	Taman Ria	Taman Anggerik; Taman Amanjaya
BAS.MY Kota Setar	K62	Sungai Petani Bus Station	Mydin Taman Batik	Taman Ria Indah; Taman Ria Jaya 1 Taman Ria Jaya 2 Taman Ria Jaya 3 Taman Ria Jaya 4 Taman Ria Jaya 1 Industrial Zone; Taman Ria Jaya 2 Industrial Zone; Mydin Taman Batik
