= Kedah State Art Gallery =

Art gallery in Kota Setar, Kedah, Malaysia

- Balai Seni Negeri Kedah
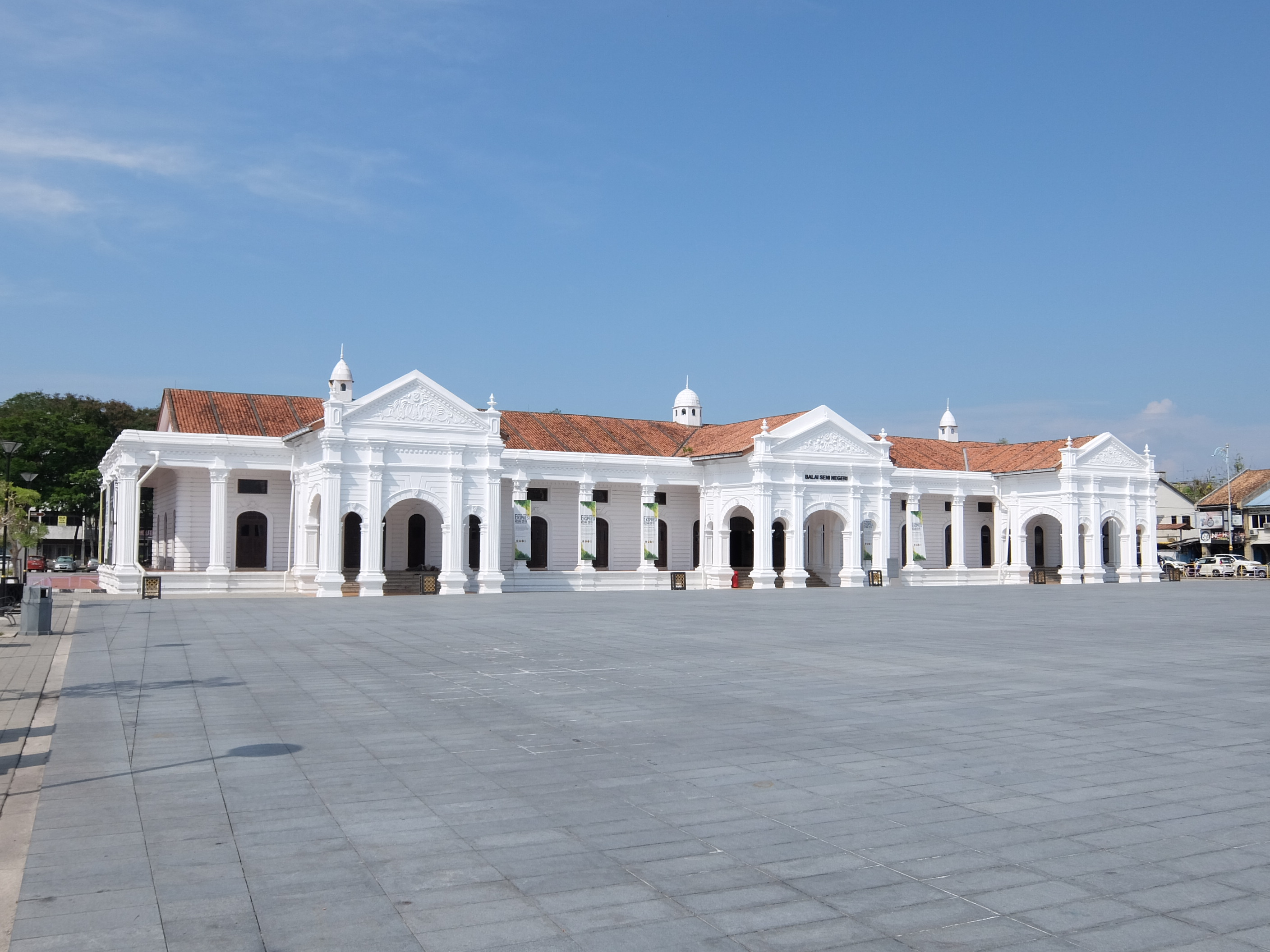
- Interactive map of the Kedah State Art Gallery area

General information
- Type: art gallery
- Location: Alor Setar, Kedah, Malaysia
- Coordinates: 6°7′7.6″N 100°21′56.0″E
- Completed: 1912
- Opened: 1983

Design and construction
- Architect: Muhammad bin Lebai Thambi

The Kedah State Art Gallery (Malay: Balai Seni Negeri Kedah) is an art gallery in Alor Setar, Kota Setar District, Kedah, Malaysia.

== History ==
The construction of the building started on 21 January 1893 and finished in 1912 and was officially opened by Kedah Sultan Abdul Hamid Halim of Kedah as the high court building, the earliest modern government building in Alor Setar. By 1931, the high court had completed their relocation to a new building beside the Federal Building, the original building was repurposed to accommodate the Audit Department, State Treasury and British Advisory Office, and would later be used to house the Public Works Department and Sewerage and Drainage Department. To mark the silver jubilee of Sultan Abdul Halim in 1983, the building was converted into an art gallery and was officiated and opened to the public by the Sultan on 25 July 1983.

== Architecture ==
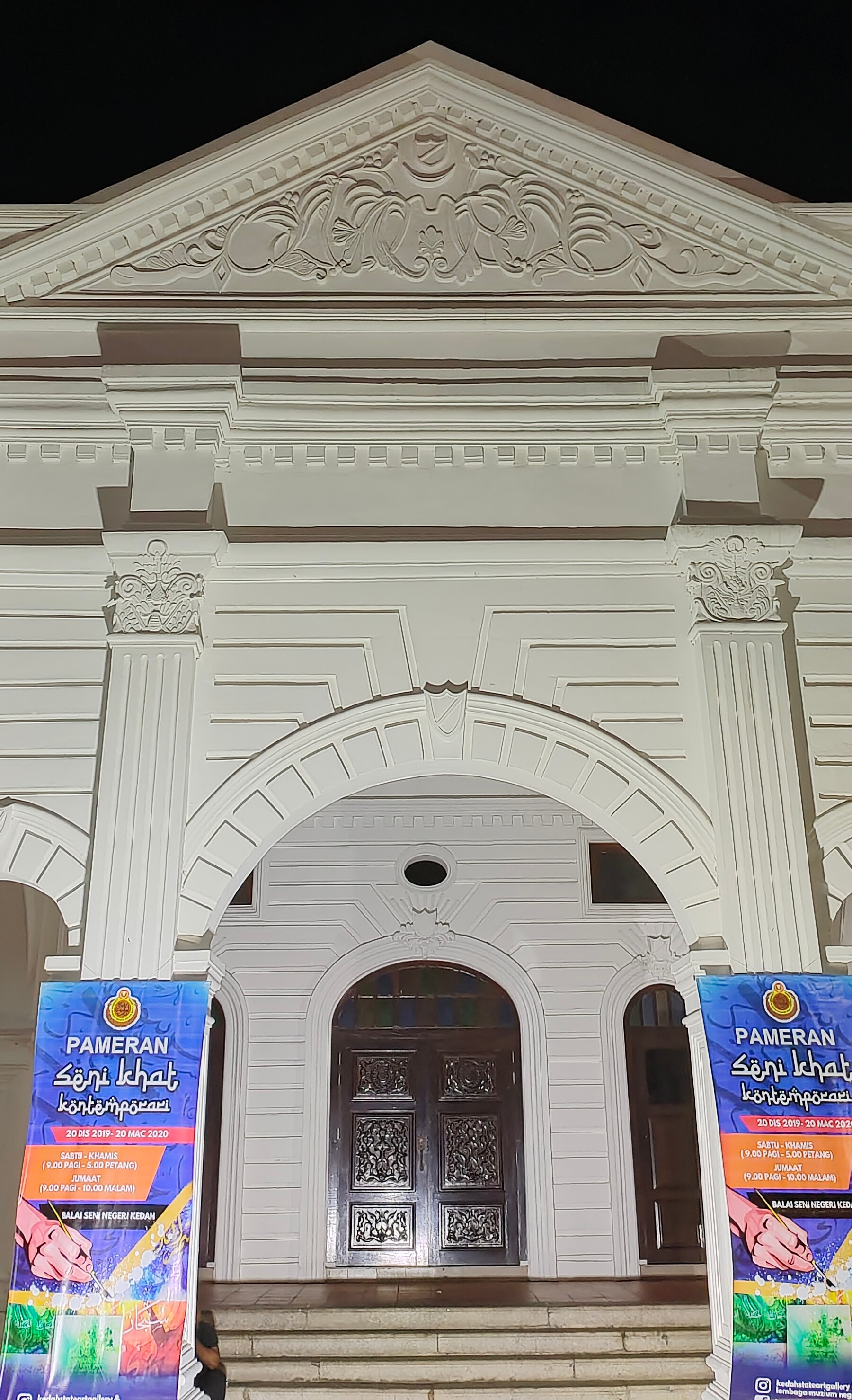
The façade of the entrance of Kedah State Art Gallery.

Originally designed by architect Muhammad bin Lebai Thambi of the Kedahan Public Works Department, the building adopts an eclectic combination of neoclassical and Sino-Portuguese architectures, with strong Palladian motifs and colonnades from the former mixed with Baroque ornamentation and extensive use of arches from the latter; of note is the presence of the Kedahan shield in the ornamentation over every arch of the building. The building is fronted by an open court comprising a public square and park.

== Exhibitions ==
The gallery displays various art works made by Kedah people, such as painting, wood carving and calligraphy.

== Transportation ==
The gallery is accessible within walking distance north west of Alor Setar railway station.

== See also ==
- List of tourist attractions in Kedah
