= List of tourist attractions in Kedah =

Tourist attractions in Kedah, Malaysia

This is the list of tourist attractions in Kedah, Malaysia.

== Galleries ==
- Kedah State Art Gallery
- Sultan Abdul Halim Mu'adzam Shah Gallery
- Upside Down House Gallery Langkawi
- Langkawi Craft Complex
- Galeria Perdana

== Historical sites ==
- Bujang Valley

== Mausoleums ==
- Kedah Royal Mausoleum

== Museums ==
- Paddy Museum
- Kedah Royal Museum
- Kota Kuala Kedah Museum

== Nature ==
- Langkawi Island
- Langkawi Legend Park
- Payar Island
- Mount Jerai
- Pedu Lake
- Sungai Merbok Mangrove Forest Reserve
- Taman Eko-Rimba Sungai Sedim
- Gua Sireh (Sireh Cave Complex)
- Ulu Legong Hot Spring
- Puncak Janing Waterfall
- Mount Keriang Recreational Park
- Pantai Merdeka

== Religious places ==
=== Mosque ===
- Kedah State Mosque
- Masjid Lama Pengkalan Kakap

== Sport centres ==
- Darul Aman Stadium
- Langkawi Stadium
- Stadium Sultan Abdul Halim

== Towers ==
- Kedah Tower
- Langkawi Tower
- SP Plaza

== Transportation ==
- Langkawi Cable Car
- Langkawi Sky Bridge

== Festivals ==
- Langkawi International Maritime and Aerospace Exhibition

== See also ==
- List of tourist attractions in Malaysia
