= Anak Bukit railway station =

Railway station in Anak Bukit, Malaysia

Coordinates: 6.1834°N 100.3749°E

Anak Bukit

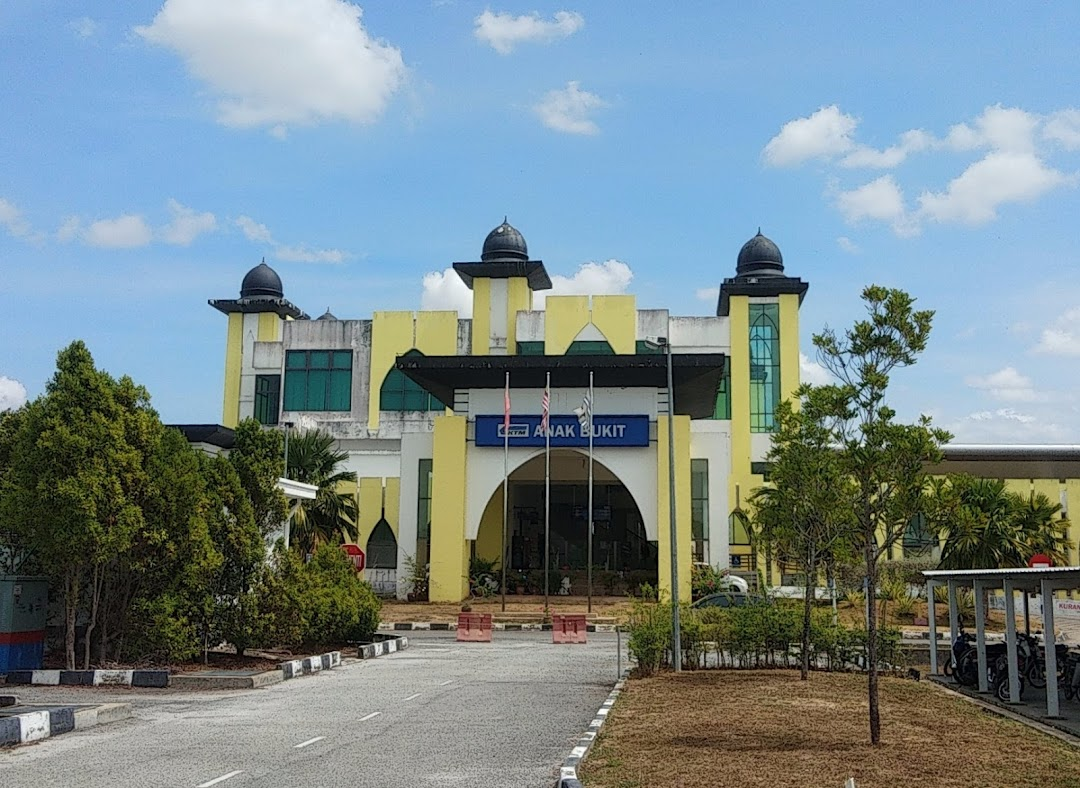

General information
- Other names: Malay: انق بوکيت (Jawi); Chinese: 安南武吉; Tamil: அனாக் புக்கிட்
- Location: Anak Bukit, Alor Setar; Kedah; Malaysia
- System: Inter-city rail and Commuter rail station
- Operator: Keretapi Tanah Melayu
- Line: West Coast Line
- Platforms: 2 island platform
- Tracks: 4

Construction
- Parking: Available

History
- Opened: 2015
- Electrified: 2015

Services
Preceding station	Keretapi Tanah Melayu (Komuter)	Following station
Kodiang towards Padang Besar	Padang Besar–Butterworth Line	Alor Setar towards Butterworth
Preceding station	Keretapi Tanah Melayu (ETS)	Following station
Arau towards Padang Besar	Padang Besar–JB Sentral (Gold)	Alor Setar towards Johor Bahru Sentral
Track layout
Location

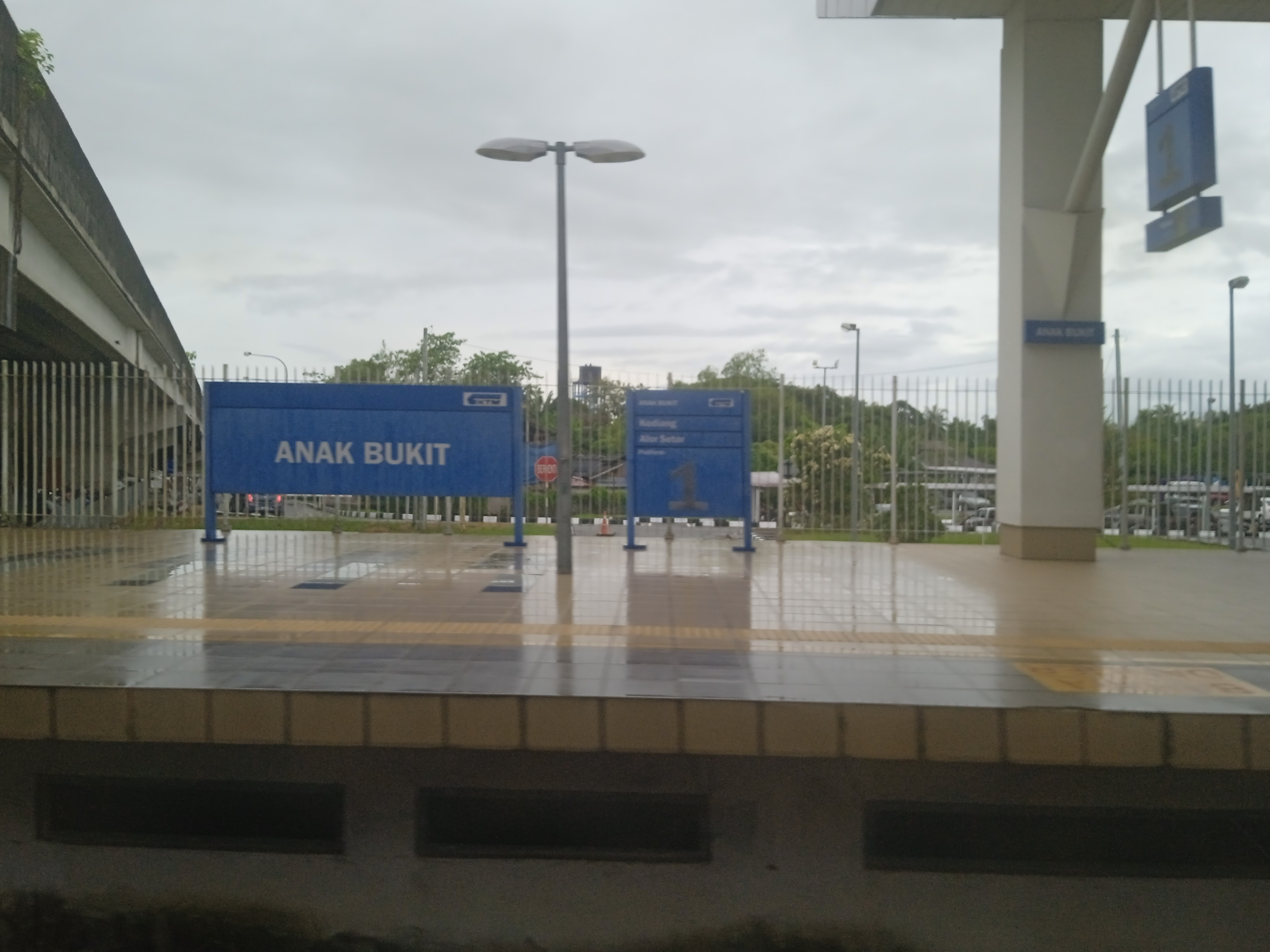
Platform at Anak Bukit station

The Anak Bukit railway station is a Malaysian railway station located at and named after the suburb of Anak Bukit, Alor Setar, Kedah.

This station is nearby the Sultan Abdul Halim Airport, within 5 to 8 minutes by taxi. This station is also close to the town of Jitra.
