= Sultan Abdul Halim Mu'adzam Shah Gallery =

Gallery in Kota Setar, Kedah, Malaysia

- Galeri Sultan Abdul Halim Mu'adzam Shah
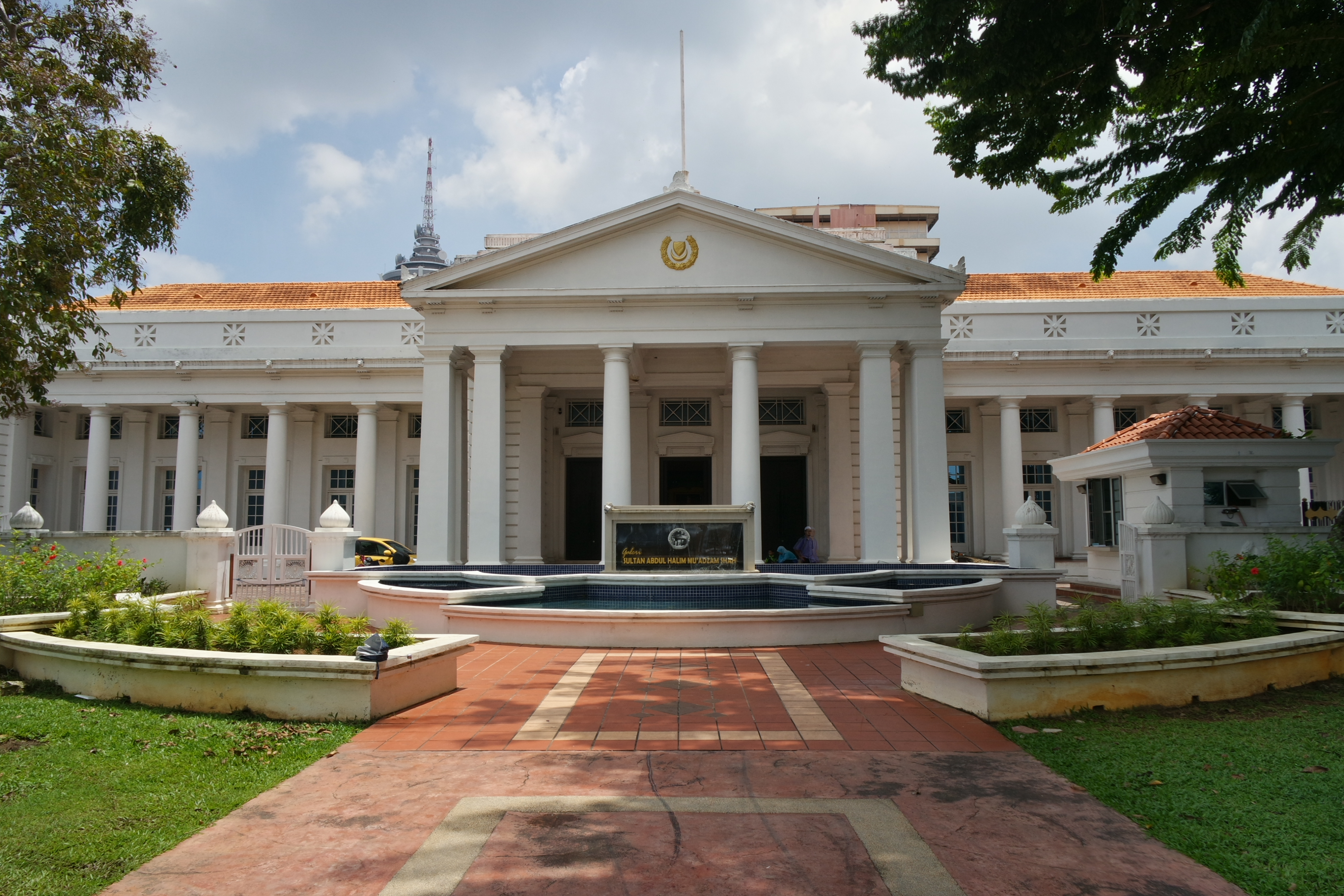
- Established: 2007
- Location: Alor Setar, Kedah, Malaysia
- Coordinates: 6°7′17.1″N 100°22′1.1″E
- Type: museum
- Architects: F. W. Wade (original building); Rusman (gallery)

The Sultan Abdul Halim Mu'adzam Shah Gallery (Malay: Galeri Sultan Abdul Halim Mu'adzam Shah) is a gallery in Alor Setar, Kedah, Malaysia showcasing the history and artifacts of Kedah Sultan Abdul Halim ibni Almarhum Sultan Badlishah.

== History ==
The building was originally completed in November 1922 as the new High Court to assume the functions of its predecessor. The building would see long-term use as the High Court until June 2005, when it was relocated to a new courts complex at Suka Menanti Street. The building was later repurposed as a gallery in 2007 at the cost of RM16 million.

== Architecture ==
The High Court building was originally designed by architect F. W. Wade with construction overseen by H. W. Fofden. Similar to the old High Court, the building incorporates Neoclassical architecture but adopts a conservative and streamlined late-stage variation of the style, featuring colonnades and a Palladian profile but lacking the eclectic ornamentation of the old High Court.

Conversion of the building into a gallery in the 2000s involved repurposing the existing building as well as constructing a modern extension mimicking the exterior style of the original structure behind the original building; the conversion work was undertaken by architect firm Rusman, with the Seri Temin Development Corporation contracted to manage construction work, Azam Hias undertaking exterior works, and Syarikat Mariwasa Kraftangan managing gallery artifacts work.

== Exhibitions ==
The gallery displays photos, collections, equipment, tool, official documents, jewellery etc. from the Sultan from more than 2,000 artifacts.

== Transportation ==
The gallery is accessible within walking distance north of Alor Setar railway station.

== See also ==
- List of tourist attractions in Kedah
- Kedah Sultanate
