= Kodiang =

Town in Kubang Pasu, Kedah, Malaysia

Coordinates: 6°23′40″N 100°18′15″E

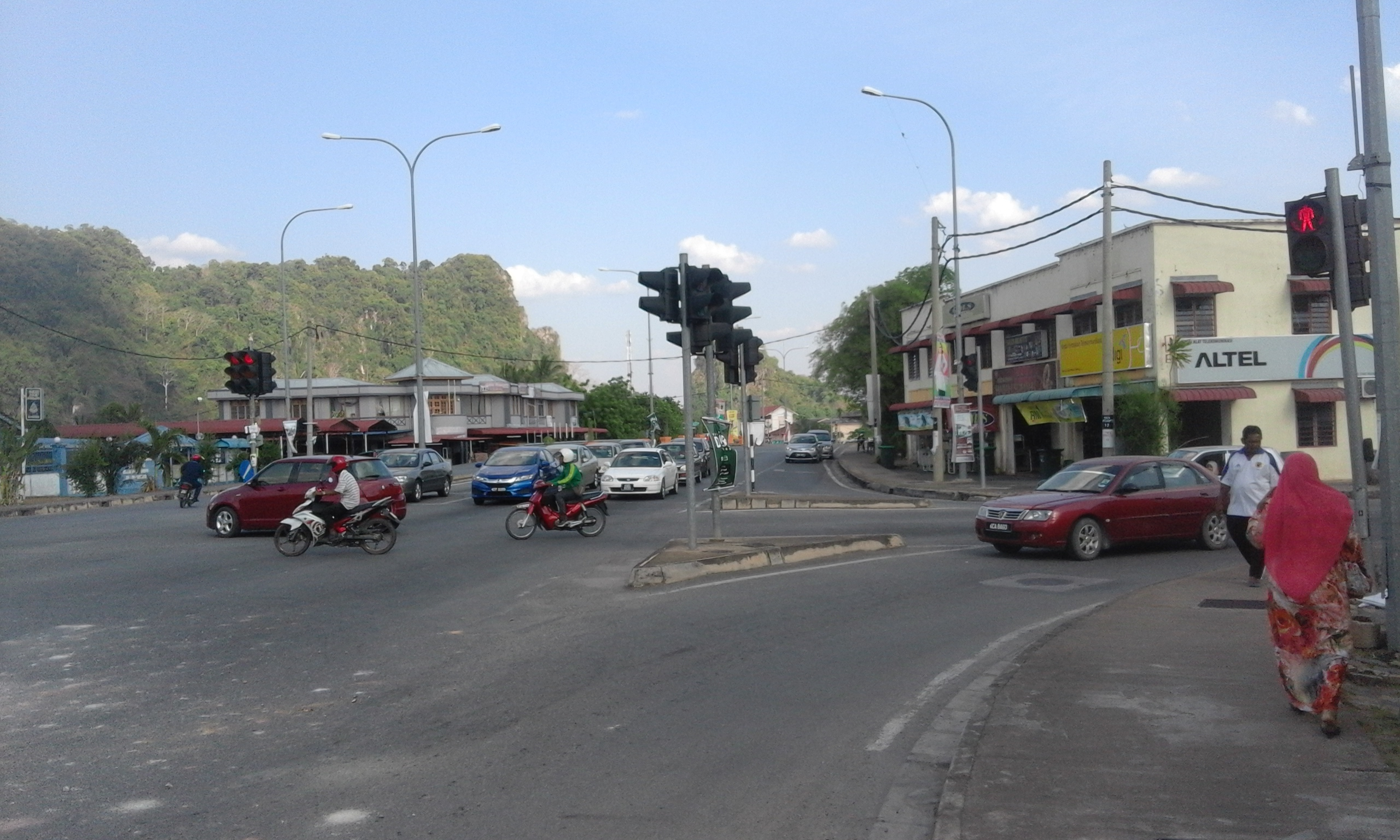
Kodiang

Kodiang in Kubang Pasu District

Kodiang is a town in Kubang Pasu District, Kedah, Malaysia. It is also a boundary town with Perlis. The name kodiang originates from Thai, khao deng (Thai: เขาแดง), which means "red hill".

== Transport ==
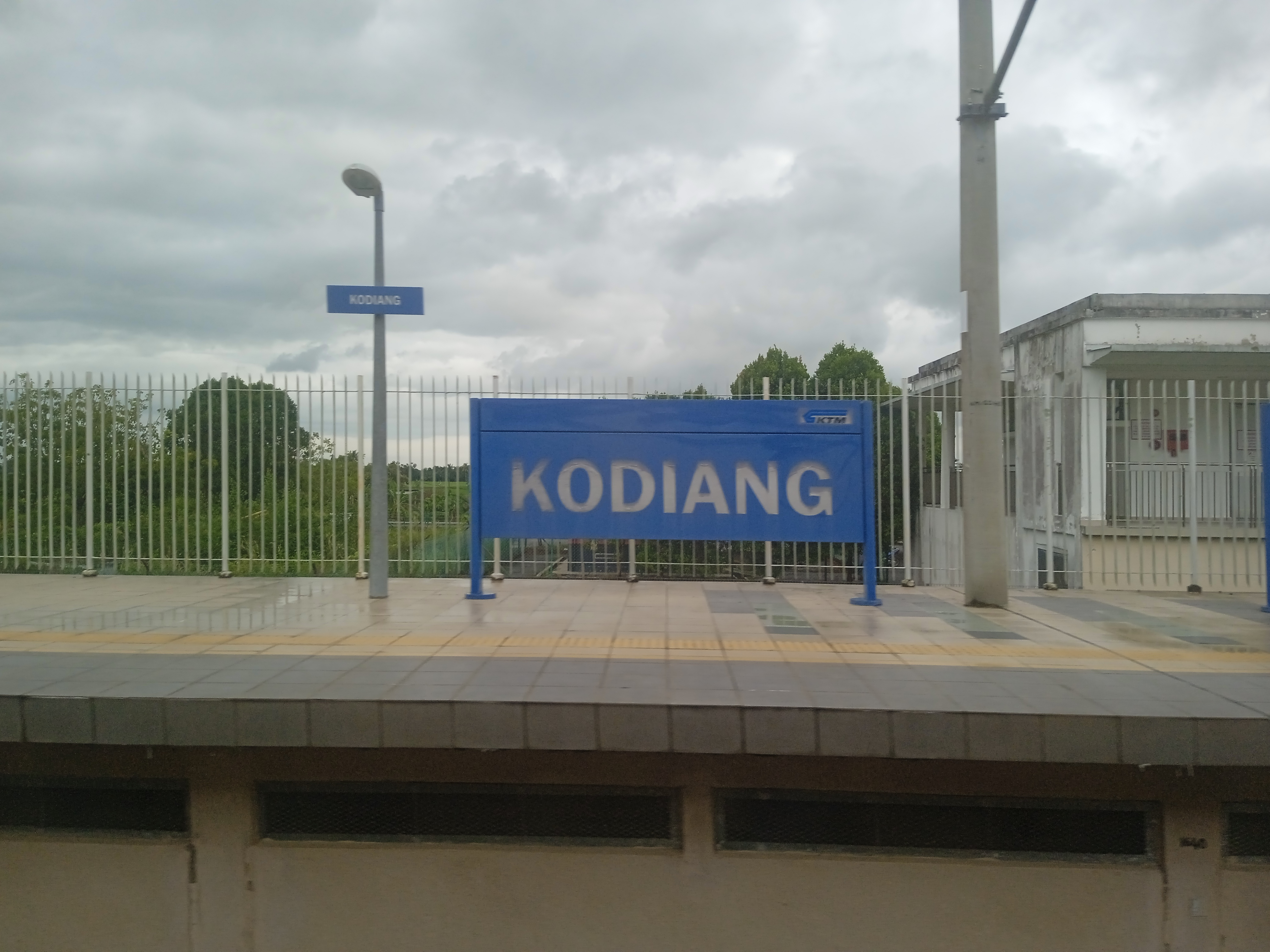
Platform at Kodiang station, in 2023

Kodiang served by KTM Komuter Northern Sector, at Kodiang railway station.

== Tourist attractions ==
- Kerbau Cave
