= Kobah railway station =

Railway station in Malaysia

Coordinates: 5°58′20.4″N 100°26′26.7″E

Kobah

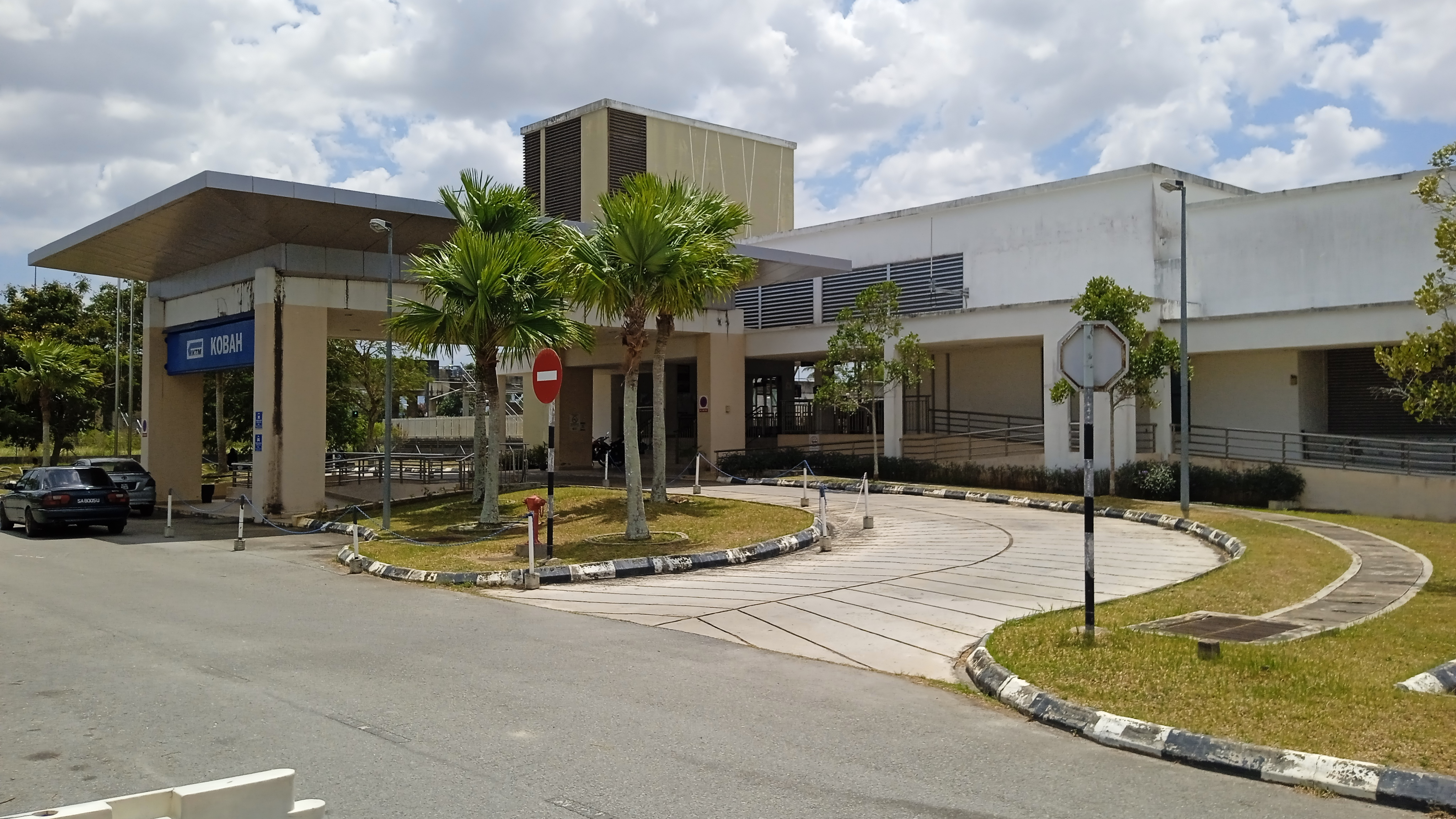
- Main entrance of station from K133 Jalan Pendang.

General information
- Other names: Malay: کوبه (Jawi); Chinese: 哥峇; Tamil: கோபா
- Location: Kobah, Pendang, Kedah, Malaysia
- System: | Commuter rail station
- Owner: Keretapi Tanah Melayu
- Line: West Coast Line
- Platforms: 2 side platform
- Tracks: 2
- Connections: K41 Alor Setar - Kota Sarang Semut - Pendang

Construction
- Parking: Available
- Accessible: Y

History
- Opened: 2015
- Electrified: 2015

Services
Preceding station	Keretapi Tanah Melayu (Komuter)	Following station
Alor Setar towards Padang Besar	Padang Besar–Butterworth Line	Gurun towards Butterworth
Location

The Kobah railway station is a Malaysian railway station located at and named after the town of Kobah, Pendang, Kedah, Malaysia.

== Services ==
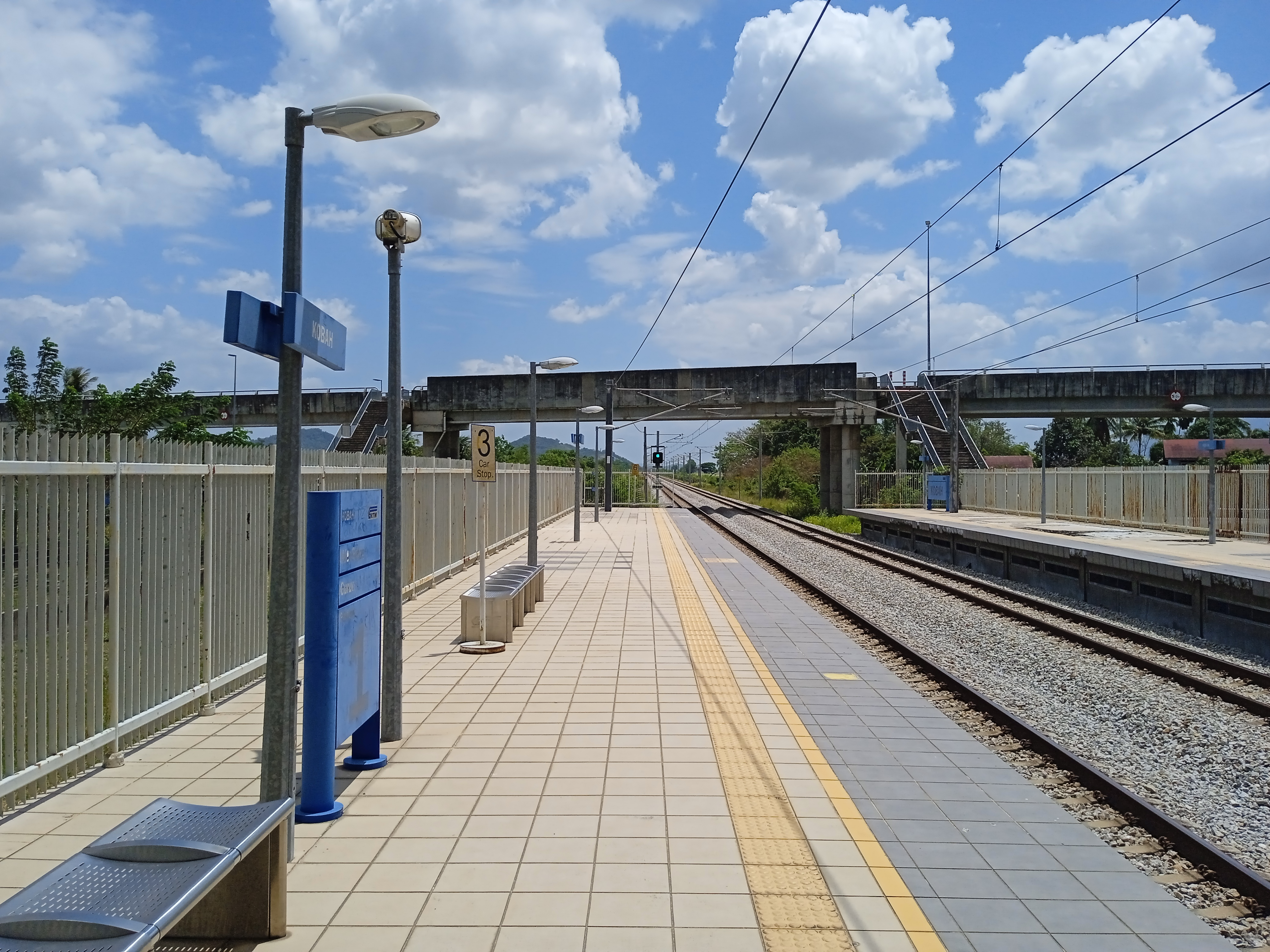
Platform at Kobah station

When it opened in 2015, the station is served by ETS Transit Ipoh–Butterworth–Padang Besar. ETS Kuala Lumpur–Padang Besar does not stop, but just run through the station. In 2016 ETS Transit was replaced by KTM Komuter Northern Sector Butterworth–Padang Besar line.

== See also ==
- KTM Komuter Northern Sector
