= Kodiang railway station =

Railway station in Kubang Pasu, Kedah, Malaysia

Coordinates: 6.3707°N 100.3027°E

Kodiang

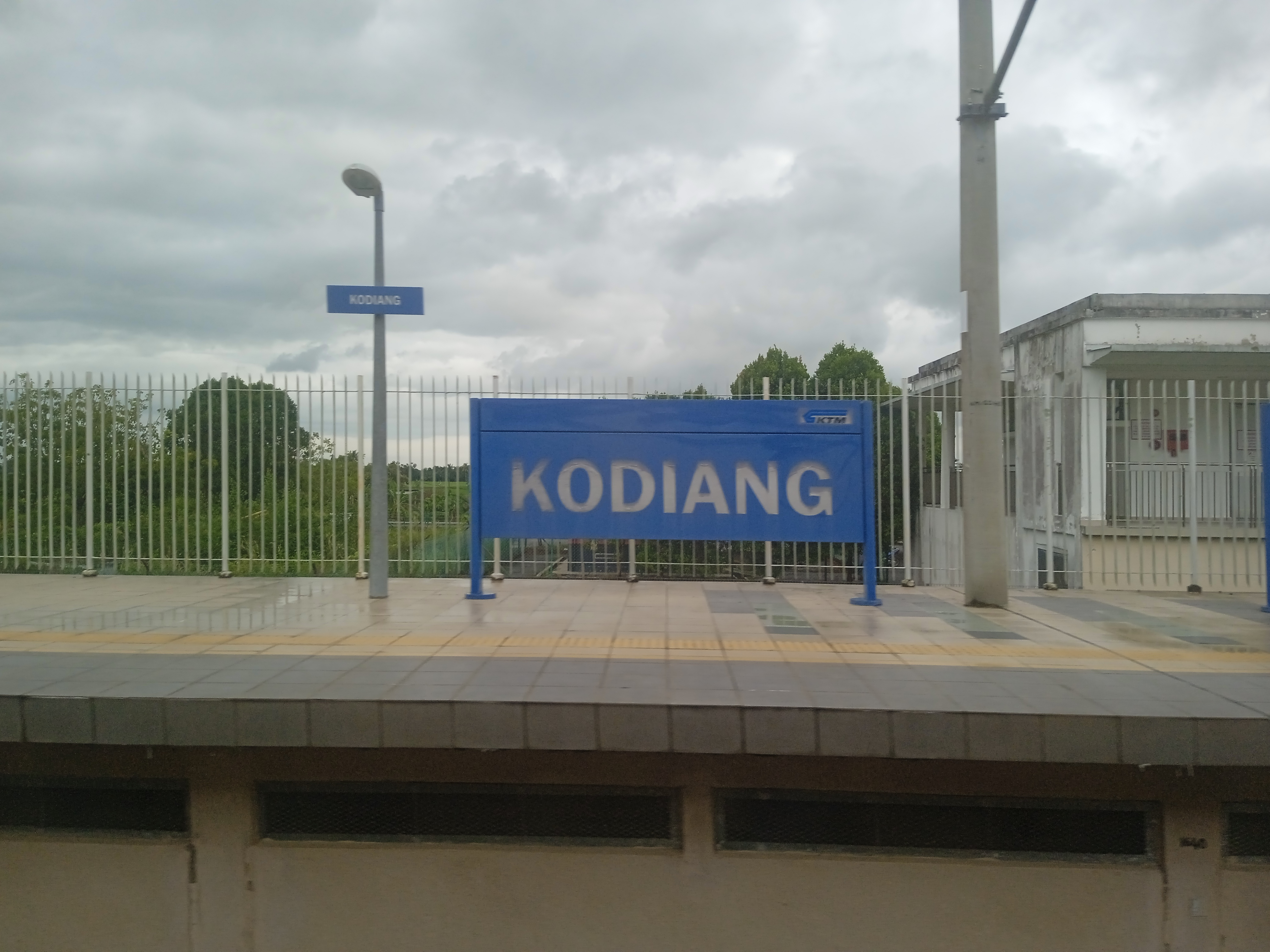
- Platform at Kodiang station

General information
- Other names: Malay: کوديڠ (Jawi); Chinese: 高岭; Tamil: கொடியாங்
- Location: Kodiang, Kubang Pasu; Kedah; Malaysia
- System: | Commuter rail station
- Owner: Keretapi Tanah Melayu
- Line: West Coast Line
- Platforms: 2 side platform
- Tracks: 2

Construction
- Parking: Available

History
- Opened: 2015
- Electrified: 25 kV AC, 50 Hz

Services
Preceding station	Keretapi Tanah Melayu (Komuter)	Following station
Arau towards Padang Besar	Padang Besar–Butterworth Line	Anak Bukit towards Butterworth
Track layout
Location

The Kodiang railway station is a Malaysian railway station located at and named after the town of Kodiang, Kubang Pasu, Kedah, Malaysia. It is served by the KTM Komuter Northern Sector Route No. 2.

== Location and locality ==
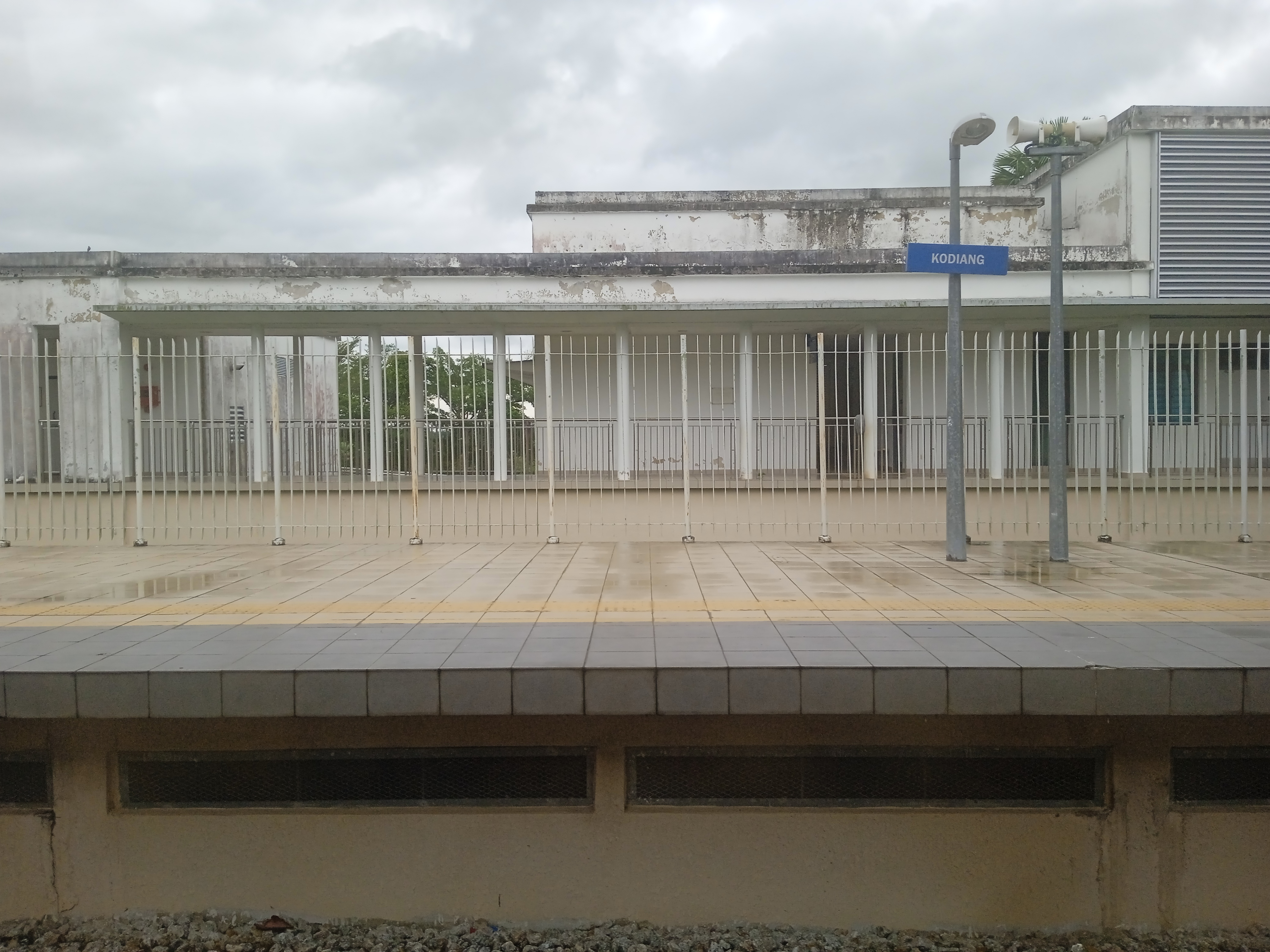
Platform at Kodiang station, looking to the concourse building

This station is located near to the town of Kodiang, not far from Perlis-Kedah state border. It is also near to Changlun and is closest station to Kedah border towns with Thailand like Sintok and Bukit Kayu Hitam.

The station is also closest to many education institutes around the district such as the Northern University of Malaysia, Kedah Matriculation College and Kubang Pasu Science School.
