= Arau railway station =

Railway station in Arau, Perlis, Malaysia

Coordinates: 6.4319°N 100.2683°E

Arau Royal Station; ستيسين دراج اراو

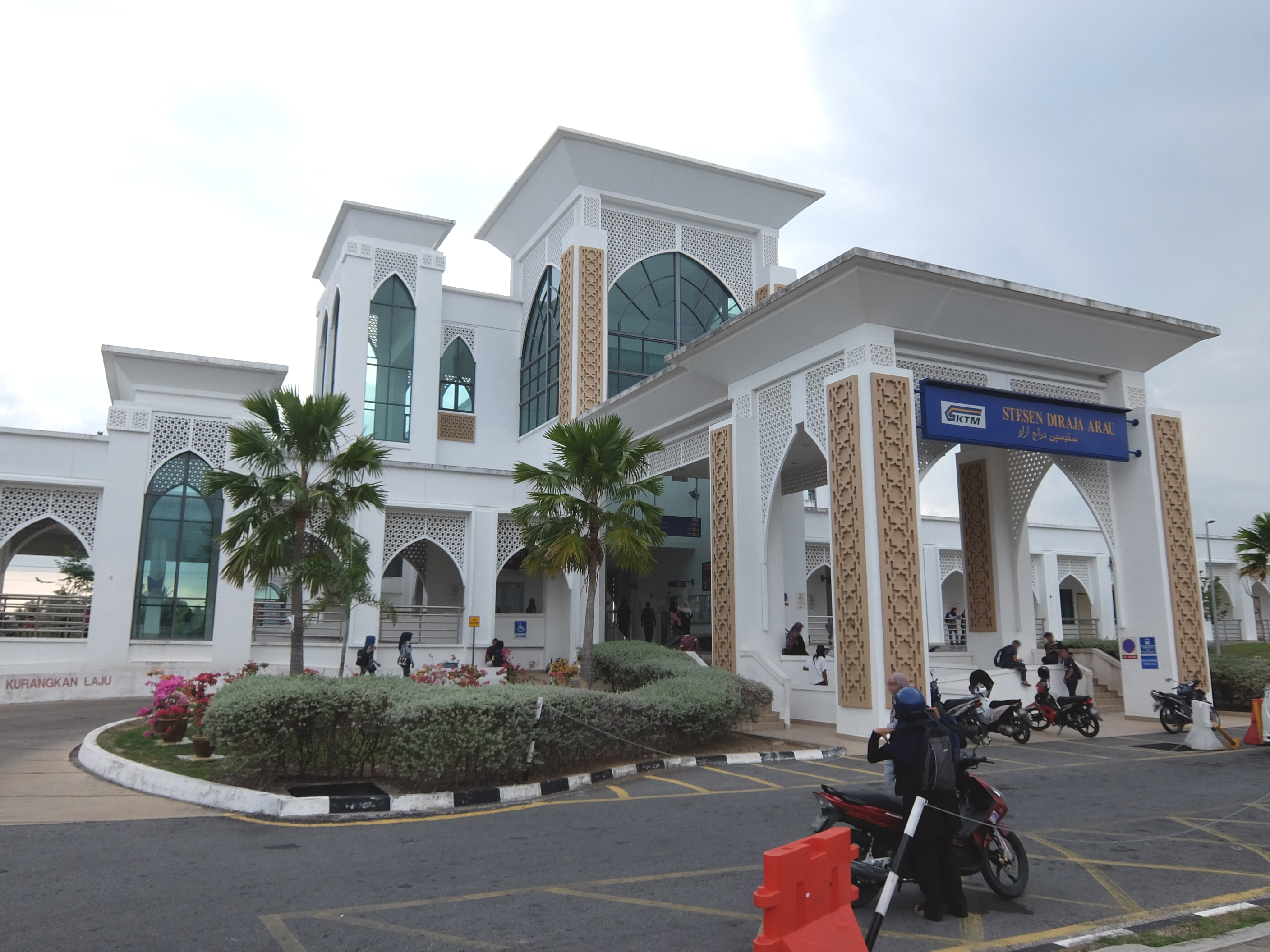
- Entrance of Arau railway station

General information
- Other names: Malay: اراو (Jawi); Chinese: 亚娄; Tamil: ஆராவ்
- Location: Arau; Perlis; Malaysia
- Owner: Railway Assets Corporation
- Operator: Keretapi Tanah Melayu
- Line: West Coast Line
- Platforms: 2 island platform
- Tracks: 2
- Connections: R10 Kangar - Arau - Changlun R14 Kangar - Arau - Jitra - Alor Setar

Construction
- Parking: Available, paid.
- Accessible: Y

History
- Opened: 1917
- Closed: June 22, 2011 (old station)
- Rebuilt: 2014
- Electrified: 2014

Services
Preceding station	Keretapi Tanah Melayu (Komuter)	Following station
Bukit Ketri towards Padang Besar	Padang Besar–Butterworth Line	Kodiang towards Butterworth
Preceding station	Keretapi Tanah Melayu (ETS)	Following station
Padang Besar Terminus	KL Sentral–Padang Besar (Express)	Alor Setar towards Kuala Lumpur Sentral
Padang Besar Terminus	KL Sentral–Padang Besar (Platinum)	Alor Setar towards Kuala Lumpur Sentral
Padang Besar Terminus	Padang Besar–JB Sentral (Platinum)	Alor Setar towards Johor Bahru Sentral
Padang Besar Terminus	Padang Besar–JB Sentral (Gold)	Anak Bukit towards Johor Bahru Sentral
Track layout
Location

Arau railway station, officially Arau Royal railway station (Malay: Stesen Diraja Arau), is a Malaysian railway station located at and named after the town of Arau in the state of Perlis.

The current railway station was built as part of the Ipoh–Padang Besar Electrification and Double-Tracking Project, which was completed in December 2014. The new station replaced an old wooden single platform station that closed on 22 June 2011.

== Location and locality ==
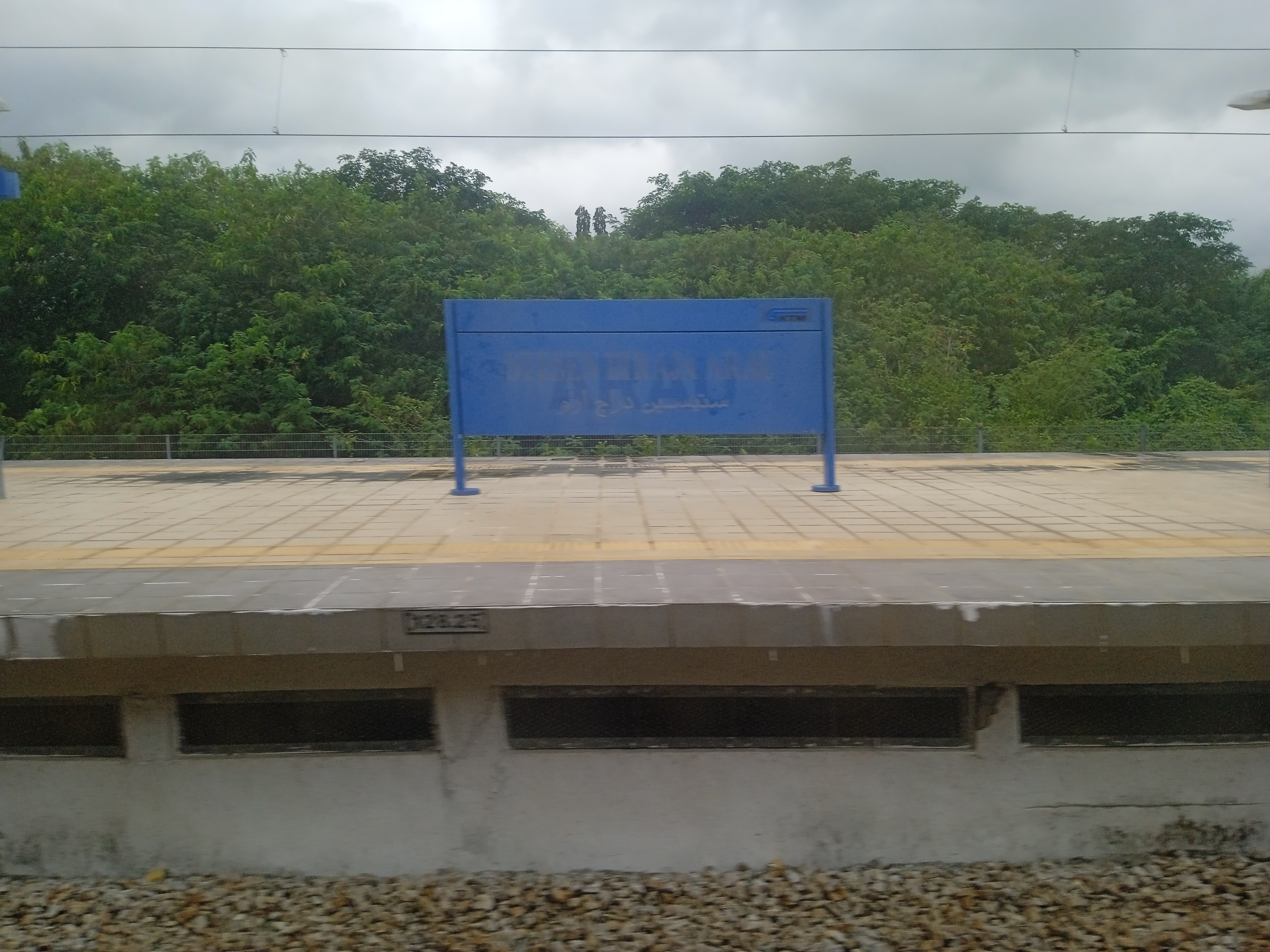
Platform at Arau station

As the name denotes, it is located in the town of Arau, Perlis and being a royal town (seat of the ruler of Perlis), it is located near the Arau Palace where the Raja of Perlis resides. The stations current name also denotes its significance to the royal town, the first and only railway station in Malaysia to have royal title. It is also located around 10 kilometres from the state capital, Kangar.

The station is served by KTM ETS and KTM Komuter Northern Sector services. The station is located near the Arau bus station, served by bus routes to Kangar, Changlun and Alor Setar, as well as taxi services to Kuala Perlis, the main jetty serving Langkawi Island.

The station also serves the University of Malaysia Perlis (UniMAP), MARA University of Technology's (UiTM) Arau Campus, Northern University of Malaysia (UUM) and the Perlis Matriculation College (KMP).

== Bus Services ==
Feeder buses also began operating linking the nearby bus terminal with several housing and commercial areas in Arau, maintained by Bas.My Kangar.

Route Type	Route No.	Origin	Destination	Via
BAS.MY Kangar	R10	Terminal Bukit Lagi, Kangar	Terminal Bas Changlun	Pauh
BAS.MY Kangar	R14	Terminal Bukit Lagi, Kangar	Shahab Perdana, Alor Setar	Kodiang Jitra

== See also ==
- Rail transport in Malaysia
