= Gurun railway station =

Railway station in Gurun, Malaysia

Coordinates: 5°49′11″N 100°28′42″E

Gurun

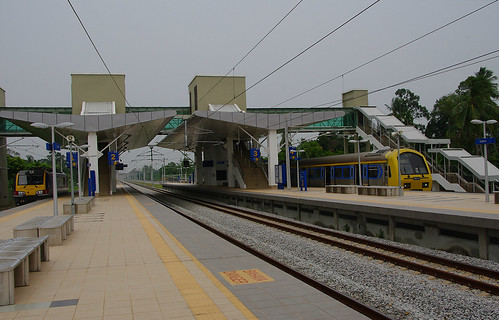

General information
- Other names: Malay: ݢورون (Jawi); Chinese: 莪仑; Tamil: குரூண்
- Location: Gurun, Kedah, Malaysia.
- System: Inter-city rail and Commuter rail station
- Owner: Keretapi Tanah Melayu
- Line: West Coast Line
- Platforms: 2 island platform
- Tracks: 5
- Connections: K50 Alor Setar - Gurun - Sungai Petani

Construction
- Parking: Available, free.
- Accessible: Y

History
- Opened: 1 March 1915
- Rebuilt: 2014
- Electrified: 2015

Services
| Preceding station | Keretapi Tanah Melayu (Komuter) | Following station |
|---|---|---|
| Kobah towards Padang Besar | Padang Besar–Butterworth Line | Sungai Petani towards Butterworth |
| Preceding station | Keretapi Tanah Melayu (ETS) | Following station |
| Alor Setar towards Padang Besar | Padang Besar–JB Sentral (Gold) | Sungai Petani towards Johor Bahru Sentral |
Location

The Gurun railway station is a Malaysian railway station located at and named after the town of Gurun, Kedah. Both KTM ETS and KTM Komuter Northern Sector trains serve this station. Gurun was the northern terminus of the Komuter service before it was extended north to Padang Besar in July 2016.

The new Gurun railway station was built as part of the Ipoh–Padang Besar Electrification and double-tracking Project and was reopened on 11 June 2014. The new station replaces and old wooden one which was demolished.

== Train services ==
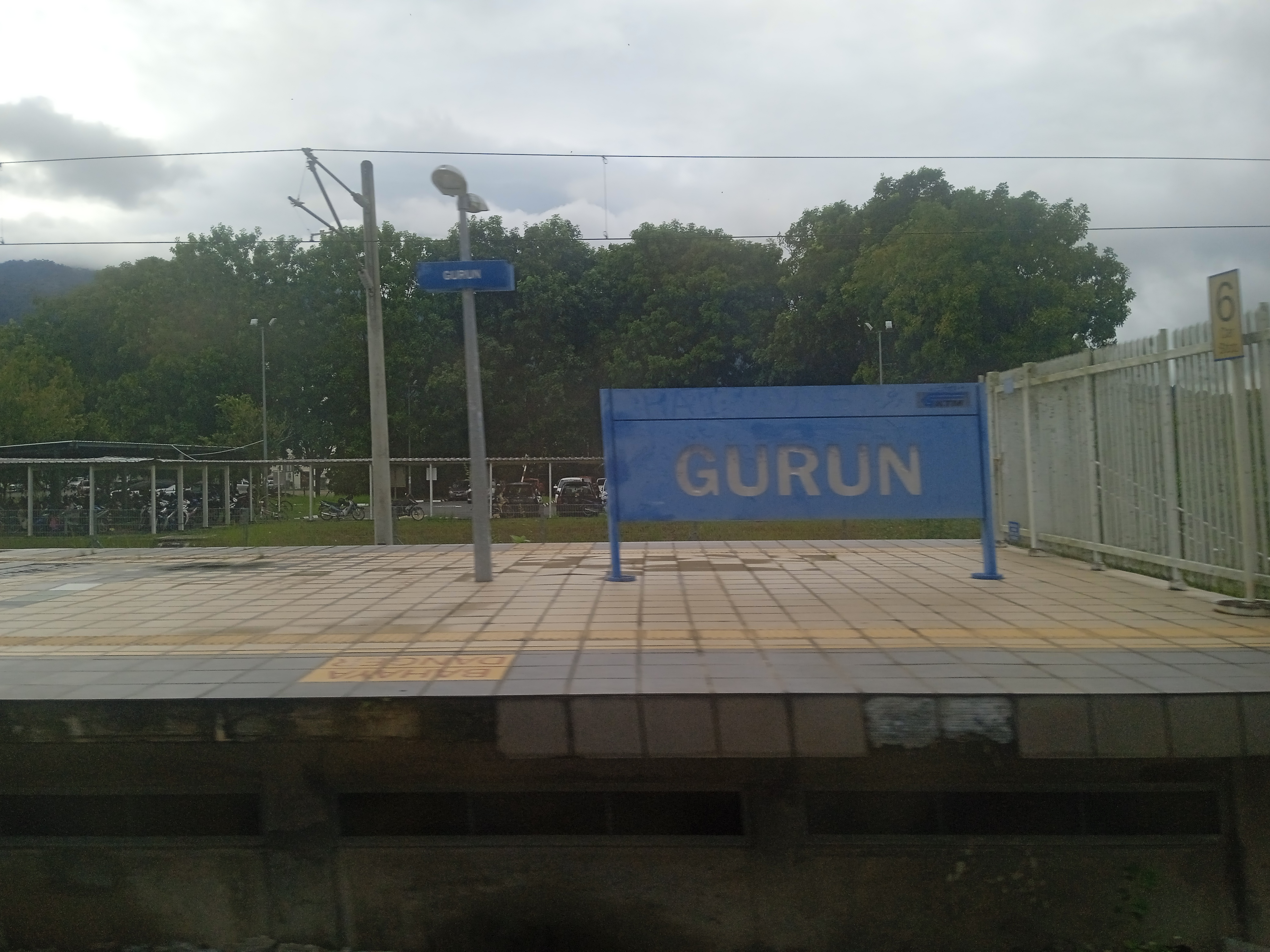
Platform at Gurun station

- ETS Gold (Padang Besar-JB Sentral) Train No. 9442/9449
