= Alor Setar railway station =

Railway station in Kota Setar, Kedah, Malaysia

Coordinates: 6°06′47″N 100°22′10″E

Alor Setar

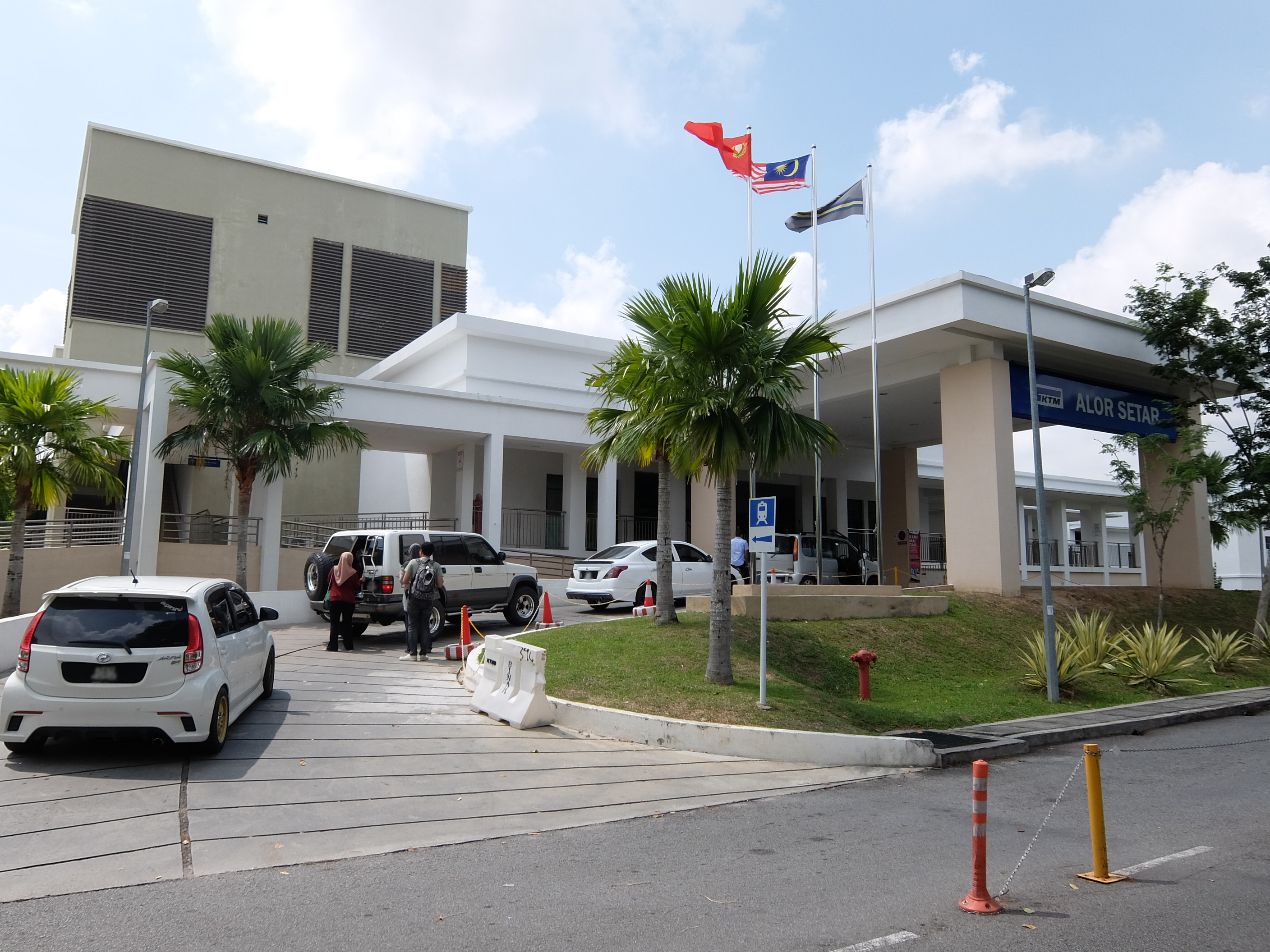

General information
- Other names: Malay: الور ستار (Jawi); Chinese: 亚罗士打; Tamil: அலோர் ஸ்டார்
- Location: Alor Setar; Kedah; Malaysia
- Owner: Railway Assets Corporation
- Operator: Keretapi Tanah Melayu
- Line: West Coast Line
- Platforms: 2 side platform
- Tracks: 2
- Connections: K100 Alor Setar

Construction
- Structure type: At-grade
- Parking: Available
- Accessible: Yes

History
- Opened: 4 October 1915
- Rebuilt: 2014
- Electrified: 2015

Services
Preceding station	Keretapi Tanah Melayu (Komuter)	Following station
Anak Bukit towards Padang Besar	Padang Besar–Butterworth Line	Kobah towards Butterworth
Preceding station	Keretapi Tanah Melayu (ETS)	Following station
Arau towards Padang Besar	KL Sentral–Padang Besar (Express)	Sungai Petani towards Kuala Lumpur Sentral
Arau towards Padang Besar	KL Sentral–Padang Besar (Platinum)	Sungai Petani towards Kuala Lumpur Sentral
Arau towards Padang Besar	Padang Besar–JB Sentral (Platinum)	Sungai Petani towards Johor Bahru Sentral
Anak Bukit towards Padang Besar	Padang Besar–JB Sentral (Gold)	Gurun towards Johor Bahru Sentral
Location

The Alor Setar railway station is a Malaysian railway station located in and named after the state capital city of Alor Setar, Kedah. The station is served by both the KTM ETS and KTM Komuter Northern Sector services.

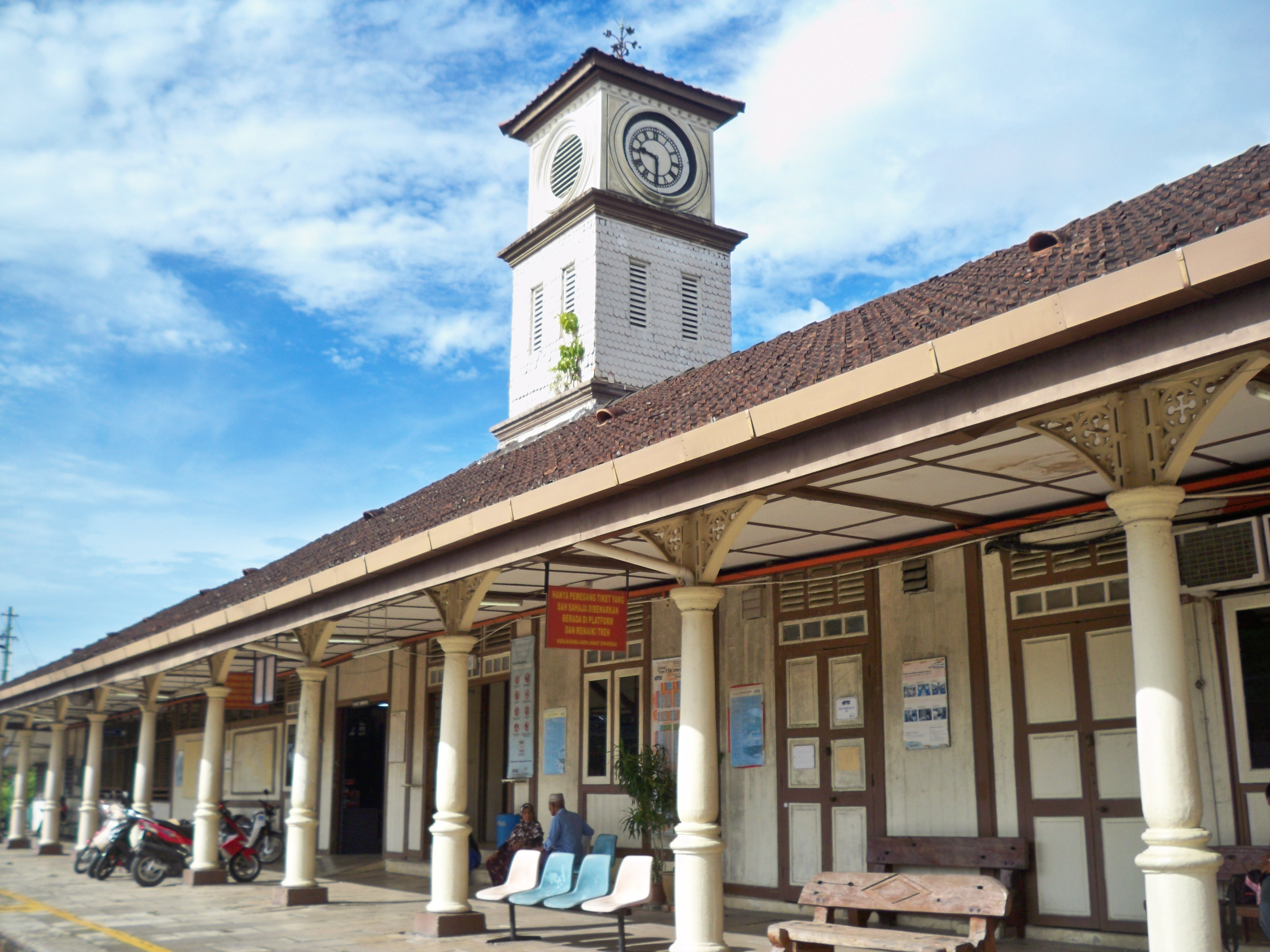
The old Alor Setar railway station in 2012, prior to its closure and conversion.

The old, single-platform station, with its distinctive clock tower, was closed 29 January 2013 to facilitate the construction of a new modern station under the Ipoh–Padang Besar electrification and double-tracking project. A temporary station opposite the old station was constructed along Jalan Tanjung Bendahara, which remained in operation until the new station adjacent to the old one began operations on 12 June 2014. The old station has been conserved and transformed into the Railway Tavern restaurant and bar. In 2020, a century-old Hindu shrine, Sri Madurai Veeran, situated at the entrance of the station, was demolished to make way for a road project despite local objections. It was built by Indian labourers who laid tracks from Butterworth to the northern frontier in the early 20th century. It was featured in the Malaysian film Ombak Rindu, in 2011.

== Bus Services ==
=== Feeder bus service ===
Feeder buses also began operating linking the station with several housing and commercial areas in Alor Setar, maintained by Bas.My Kota Setar.

Route No.	Origin	Desitination	Via
K100	KTM Alor Setar	Shahab Perdana, Alor Setar	Shahab Perdana; Pekan Rabu; KTM Alor Setar; Stadium Darul Aman

== Around the station ==
- Kedah State Art Gallery
- Sultan Abdul Halim Mu'adzam Shah Gallery
